= Results of the 1933 South Australian state election (House of Assembly) =

South Australian state election, 8 April 1933 House of Assembly << 1930–1938 >>
Enrolled voters	338,576				
Votes cast	182,693		Turnout	59.45%	–11.91%
Informal votes	8,904		Informal	4.87%	-0.84%
Summary of votes by party
Party	Primary votes	%	Swing	Seats	Change
Liberal and Country	60,159	34.62%	*	29	*
Labor	48,273	27.78%	–20.86%	6	– 24
Parliamentary Labor	28,319	16.30%	*	4	*
Lang Labor	6,398	3.68%	*	3	*
Single Tax League	5,429	3.12%	+1.80%	1	± 0
Communist	1,908	1.10%	+0.77%	0	± 0
Independent	23,303	13.41%	+11.09%	3	+ 3
Total	173,789			46	

This is a list of House of Assembly results for the 1933 South Australian state election. Each district elected multiple members.

== Results by electoral district ==
=== Adelaide ===
1933 South Australian state election: Adelaide
Party	Candidate	Votes	%	±%
Lang Labor	Doug Bardolph (elected 1)	2,669	35.4	+35.4
Lang Labor	Bob Dale (elected 2)	153	2.0	+2.0
Lang Labor	Tom Howard (elected 3)	30	0.4	+0.4
Labor	Martin Collaton	1,516	20.1	+20.1
Labor	Herbert George	240	3.2	−0.2
Labor	Edward McDonnell	181	2.4	+2.4
Parliamentary Labor	Bill Denny	1,072	14.2	−67.5
Parliamentary Labor	Clement Wells	180	2.4	+2.4
Parliamentary Labor	Martin Dwyer	25	0.3	+0.3
Liberal and Country	Kingsley Hilton	1,073	14.2	+14.2
Liberal and Country	Duncan Menzies	64	0.9	+0.9
Liberal and Country	J Trego-Williams	39	0.5	+0.5
Communist	Tom Garland	307	4.1	+4.1
Total formal votes		7,549	91.4	−0.8
Informal votes		713	8.6	+0.8
Turnout		8,262	61.2	+2.3
Party total votes
Lang Labor		2,847	37.7	+37.7
Labor		1,937	25.7	−63.9
Parliamentary Labor		1,277	16.9	+16.9
Liberal and Country		1,176	15.6	+15.6
Communist		307	4.1	−0.7

=== Albert ===
1933 South Australian state election: Albert
Party	Candidate	Votes	%	±%
Liberal and Country	Malcolm McIntosh (elected 1)	3,695	40.7	+4.0
Liberal and Country	Frederick McMillan	187	2.1	−0.5
Independent	Tom Stott (elected 2)	3,013	33.2	+33.2
Single Tax League	Jacob Groth	1,908	21.0	+21.0
Single Tax League	Oscar Kunoth	277	3.1	+3.1
Total formal votes		9,080	94.1	0.0
Informal votes		365	3.9	0.0
Turnout		9,445	61.1	−12.9
Party total votes
Liberal and Country		3,882	42.8	+3.5
Independent	Tom Stott	3,013	33.2	+33.2
Single Tax League		2,185	24.1	+24.1

=== Alexandra ===
1933 South Australian state election: Alexandra
Party	Candidate	Votes	%	±%
Liberal and Country	George Laffer (elected 1)	unopposed		
Liberal and Country	Herbert Hudd (elected 2)	unopposed		
Liberal and Country	Percy Heggaton (elected 3)	unopposed		

=== Barossa ===
1933 South Australian state election: Barossa
Party	Candidate	Votes	%	±%
Liberal and Country	Henry Crosby (elected 1)	3,522	39.5	+5.3
Liberal and Country	Reginald Rudall	184	2.1	+2.1
Liberal and Country	Herbert Lyons (elected 3)	124	1.4	−1.7
Parliamentary Labor	Thomas Edwards	2,007	22.5	+20.0
Parliamentary Labor	Harold Zadow	54	0.6	+0.6
Parliamentary Labor	Arthur McArthur	47	0.5	+0.5
Independent	Herbert Basedow (elected 2)	1,672	18.8	−4.3
Independent	Lindsay Yelland	64	0.7	+0.7
Labor	Leslie McMullin	1,135	12.7	+12.7
Labor	John Whitfield	64	0.7	+0.7
Labor	Sid O'Flaherty	38	0.4	+0.4
Total formal votes		8,911	94.9	+1.4
Informal votes		474	5.1	−1.4
Turnout		9,385	66.6	−11.9
Party total votes
Liberal and Country		3,830	43.0	+5.6
Parliamentary Labor		2,108	23.7	+23.7
Independent		1,736	19.5	+5.0
Labor		1,237	13.9	−32.8

=== Burra Burra ===
1933 South Australian state election: Burra Burra
Party	Candidate	Votes	%	±%
Liberal and Country	George Jenkins (elected 1)	3,464	39.0	+1.9
Liberal and Country	Alexander Melrose (elected 2)	199	2.2	+2.2
Liberal and Country	Archibald McDonald (elected 3)	172	1.9	+1.9
Parliamentary Labor	Jack Critchley	1,940	21.8	−19.2
Parliamentary Labor	Sydney McHugh	467	5.3	−4.9
Parliamentary Labor	Even George	224	2.5	+1.0
Labor	Thomas Canny	2,208	24.8	+24.8
Labor	Leonard Wilcott	160	1.8	+1.8
Labor	James Marner	63	0.7	+0.7
Total formal votes		8,897	96.0	+2.2
Informal votes		375	4.0	−2.2
Turnout		9,272	71.2	−7.1
Party total votes
Liberal and Country		3,835	43.1	−4.2
Parliamentary Labor		2,631	29.6	+29.6
Labor		2,431	27.3	−25.1

=== East Torrens ===
1933 South Australian state election: East Torrens
Party	Candidate	Votes	%	±%
Liberal and Country	Charles Abbott (elected 1)	8,207	40.3	+40.3
Liberal and Country	Walter Hamilton (elected 2)	470	2.3	−3.8
Liberal and Country	Frank Perry (elected 3)	460	2.3	+2.3
Labor	Loftus Fenwick	6,179	30.3	+30.3
Labor	Beasley Kearney	496	2.4	−42.4
Labor	Cecil Nicholls	222	1.1	+1.1
Parliamentary Labor	Herbert Byrne	3,663	18.0	+18.0
Parliamentary Labor	Herman Dankel	521	2.6	+2.6
Parliamentary Labor	Clarence Cooke	144	0.7	+0.7
Total formal votes		20,362	94.9	+0.2
Informal votes		1,097	5.1	−0.2
Turnout		21,459	55.7	−14.2
Party total votes
Liberal and Country		9,137	44.9	−5.0
Labor		6,897	33.9	−16.2
Parliamentary Labor		4,328	21.3	+21.3

=== Flinders ===
1933 South Australian state election: Flinders
Party	Candidate	Votes	%	±%
Single Tax League	Edward Craigie (elected 1)	3,190	41.0	+7.0
Single Tax League	James Moore	54	0.7	+0.7
Liberal and Country	Arthur Christian (elected 2)	2,186	28.1	+28.1
Liberal and Country	James McDonald	358	4.6	+4.6
Labor	Leo Cash	1,419	18.2	+18.2
Labor	Thomas Cash	172	2.2	+2.2
Independent	Albert Pfitzner	411	5.3	+5.3
Total formal votes		7,790	95.7	+0.1
Informal votes		353	4.3	−0.1
Turnout		8,143	64.1	−6.5
Party total votes
Single Tax League		3,244	41.7	+7.7
Liberal and Country		2,544	32.7	+2.7
Labor		1,591	20.4	+3.8
Independent	Albert Pfitzner	411	5.3	+5.3

=== Murray ===
1933 South Australian state election: Murray
Party	Candidate	Votes	%	±%
Liberal and Country	George Morphett (elected 1)	3,304	41.3	+30.0
Liberal and Country	Thomas Playford (elected 2)	341	4.3	+4.3
Liberal and Country	Howard Shannon (elected 3)	233	2.9	+2.9
Parliamentary Labor	Clement Collins	1,800	22.5	−7.3
Parliamentary Labor	Frank Staniford	1,009	12.6	+5.9
Parliamentary Labor	Robert Hunter	46	0.6	−0.3
Labor	John Cassidy	1,124	14.1	+14.1
Labor	Davis Fraser	88	1.1	+1.1
Labor	Herbert Gersch	56	0.7	+0.7
Total formal votes		8,001	95.1	+3.7
Informal votes		411	4.9	−3.7
Turnout		8,412	59.1	−16.2
Party total votes
Liberal and Country		3,878	48.5	−1.2
Parliamentary Labor		2,855	35.7	+35.7
Labor		1,268	15.8	−31.6

=== Newcastle ===
1933 South Australian state election: Newcastle
Party	Candidate	Votes	%	±%
Labor	James Beerworth (elected 1)	1,639	40.5	
Labor	Lindsay Riches (elected 2)	168	4.2	
Liberal and Country	Corba Sunman	1,059	26.2	
Liberal and Country	Robert McEwin	163	4.0	
Parliamentary Labor	Thomas Butterfield	886	21.9	
Parliamentary Labor	William Harvey	131	3.2	
Total formal votes		4,046	96.1	
Informal votes		163	3.9	
Turnout		4,209	68.9	
Party total votes
Labor		1,807	44.7	
Liberal and Country		1,222	30.2	
Parliamentary Labor		1,017	25.1	

=== North Adelaide ===
1933 South Australian state election: North Adelaide
Party	Candidate	Votes	%	±%
Liberal and Country	Shirley Jeffries (elected 1)	4,904	40.7	+1.4
Liberal and Country	Victor Newland (elected 2)	467	3.9	−4.5
Labor	Walter Warne	3,436	28.5	+22.0
Labor	Frank Wilton	175	1.5	+1.5
Parliamentary Labor	A S Horne	2,940	24.4	+24.4
Parliamentary Labor	C G Johnson	129	1.1	+1.1
Total formal votes		12,051	95.8	−1.2
Informal votes		528	4.2	+1.2
Turnout		12,579	57.2	−15.2
Party total votes
Liberal and Country		5,371	44.6	−3.0
Labor		3,611	30.0	−22.3
Parliamentary Labor		3,069	25.4	+25.4

=== Port Adelaide ===
1933 South Australian state election: Port Adelaide
Party	Candidate	Votes	%	±%
Labor	James Stephens (elected 1)	5,562	34.0	+34.0
Labor	Albert Thompson (elected 2)	2,416	14.8	+4.5
Independent	Ernest Evans	3,046	18.6	+18.6
Independent	Arthur Lewis	1,411	8.6	+8.6
Lang Labor	Arthur Dadleff	2,223	13.6	+13.6
Lang Labor	Frederick Hearne	192	1.2	+1.2
Communist	John Zwolsman	897	5.5	+5.5
Independent	Charles Hayter	619	3.8	+3.8
Total formal votes		16,366	94.6	−0.4
Informal votes		927	5.4	+0.4
Turnout		17,293	58.5	−12.3
Party total votes
Labor		7,978	48.7	−30.3
Independent		4,457	27.2	+27.2
Lang Labor		2,415	14.8	+14.8
Communist		897	5.5	+5.5
Independent	Charles Hayter	619	3.8	+3.8

=== Port Pirie ===
1933 South Australian state election: Port Pirie
Party	Candidate	Votes	%	±%
Labor	Andrew Lacey (elected 1)	unopposed		
Labor	John Fitzgerald (elected 2)	unopposed		

=== Stanley ===
1933 South Australian state election: Stanley
Party	Candidate	Votes	%	±%
Liberal and Country	Robert Nicholls (elected 1)	unopposed		
Liberal and Country	John Lyons (elected 2)	unopposed		

=== Sturt ===
1933 South Australian state election: Sturt
Party	Candidate	Votes	%	±%
Liberal and Country	Ernest Anthoney (elected 1)	13,423	50.7	+12.6
Liberal and Country	Henry Dunks (elected 2)	620	2.3	+2.3
Liberal and Country	Horace Hogben (elected 3)	512	1.9	+1.9
Labor	Edgar Dawes	10,975	41.4	+39.9
Labor	Thomas Grealy	673	2.5	−1.1
Labor	James Hawke	293	1.1	+1.1
Total formal votes		26,496	95.2	+1.8
Informal votes		1,335	4.8	−1.8
Turnout		27,831	51.2	−18.3
Party total votes
Liberal and Country		14,555	54.9	+10.8
Labor		11,941	45.1	−7.1

=== Victoria ===
1933 South Australian state election: Victoria
Party	Candidate	Votes	%	±%
Liberal and Country	Vernon Petherick (elected 1)	3,315	35.7	+25.3
Liberal and Country	Ronald Hunt (elected 2)	713	7.7	+7.7
Parliamentary Labor	Eric Shepherd	1,949	21.0	−24.1
Parliamentary Labor	Jim Corcoran	1,641	17.7	+17.7
Independent	Anthony Sutton	1,225	13.2	+13.2
Independent	Peter Crafter	453	4.9	+4.9
Total formal votes		9,296	96.2	+1.9
Informal votes		364	3.8	−1.9
Turnout		9,660	68.3	−16.3
Party total votes
Liberal and Country		4,028	43.3	−8.4
Parliamentary Labor		3,590	38.6	+38.6
Independent	Anthony Sutton	1,225	13.2	+13.2
Independent	Peter Crafter	453	4.9	+4.9

=== Wallaroo ===
1933 South Australian state election: Wallaroo
Party	Candidate	Votes	%	±%
Parliamentary Labor	Robert Richards (elected 1)	2,197	42.9	+33.5
Parliamentary Labor	John Pedler (elected 2)	161	3.2	−46.9
Independent	Cecil Chapman	1,293	25.8	+25.8
Independent	Frank Filmer	294	5.9	−17.1
Labor	Percival Chynoweth	993	19.8	+19.8
Labor	John Phillips	70	1.4	+1.4
Total formal votes		5,008	97.0	+0.9
Informal votes		156	3.0	−0.9
Turnout		5,164	84.5	+0.8
Party total votes
Parliamentary Labor		2,358	47.1	+47.1
Independent		1,587	31.7	−3.5
Labor		1,063	21.2	−38.3

=== West Torrens ===
1933 South Australian state election: West Torrens
Party	Candidate	Votes	%	±%
Labor	Horace Barnes	5,534	31.5	+31.5
Labor	Harry Kneebone	978	5.6	+5.6
Parliamentary Labor	John McInnes (elected 1)	3,438	19.5	−14.2
Parliamentary Labor	Alfred Blackwell (elected 2)	1,648	9.4	−60.3
Independent	Jules Langdon	3,699	21.0	+21.0
Independent	Charles Lloyd	460	2.6	+2.6
Lang Labor	Joseph Naylon	1,064	6.1	+6.1
Lang Labor	Arthur Sonnemann	67	0.4	+0.4
Communist	Thomas McGillick	704	4.0	+2.2
Total formal votes		17,592	94.0	−0.8
Informal votes		1,113	6.0	+0.8
Turnout		18,705	53.9	−11.4
Party total votes
Labor		6,512	37.0	−38.0
Parliamentary Labor		5,086	28.9	+28.9
Independent		4,159	23.6	+23.6
Lang Labor		1,131	6.4	+6.4
Communist		704	4.0	+2.2

=== Wooroora ===
1933 South Australian state election: Wooroora
Party	Candidate	Votes	%	±%
Liberal and Country	Richard Butler (elected 1)	3,256	46.3	+0.7
Liberal and Country	Archie Cameron (elected 2)	481	6.8	−42.0
Liberal and Country	Samuel Dennison (elected 3)	278	4.0	+2.8
Independent	Maurice Collins	2,024	28.8	+28.8
Independent	Alfred Parker	833	11.8	+11.8
Independent	Edgar Wills	165	2.3	+2.3
Total formal votes		7,037	95.1	+0.1
Informal votes		366	4.9	−0.1
Turnout		7,403	67.0	−14.2
Party total votes
Liberal and Country		4,015	57.1	+8.3
Independent	Maurice Collins	2,024	28.8	+28.8
Independent	Alfred Parker	833	11.8	+11.8
Independent	Edgar Wills	165	2.3	+2.3

=== Yorke Peninsula ===
1933 South Australian state election: Yorke Peninsula
Party	Candidate	Votes	%	±%
Liberal and Country	Baden Pattinson (elected 2)	2,254	42.5	+15.7
Liberal and Country	Edward Giles	432	8.1	+31.1
Independent	Daniel Davies (elected 1)	2,263	42.6	+42.6
Independent	Hugh Hudson	358	6.8	+6.8
Total formal votes		5,307	97.0	+1.9
Informal votes		164	3.0	−1.9
Turnout		5,471	71.8	−1.7
Party total votes
Liberal and Country		2,686	50.6	−15.4
Independent		2,621	49.6	+49.6

== See also ==
- Candidates of the 1933 South Australian state election
- Members of the South Australian House of Assembly, 1933–1938
