= Candidates of the 1933 South Australian state election =

This is a list of candidates of the 1933 South Australian state election.

== Retiring MPs ==
=== Official Labor ===
- John Jonas (Port Adelaide) – lost preselection
- Frank Nieass (East Torrens) – lost preselection

=== Parliamentary Labor ===
- Frederick Birrell (North Adelaide) – retired
- George Cooke (Barossa) – retired
- Lionel Hill (Port Pirie) – appointed Agent General in London
- Leonard Hopkins (Barossa) – retired
- James Jelley MLC (Central District No. 1) – retired

=== Liberal and Country League ===
- William George Mills MLC (Northern District) – retired
- James Moseley (Flinders) – retired
- George Henry Prosser MLC (Central District No. 2) – retired
- Thomas Pascoe MLC (Midland District) – retired

== House of Assembly ==
Sitting members are shown in bold text. Successful candidates are marked with an asterisk.

Electorate	Liberal and Country candidates	Official Labor candidates	Parliamentary Labor candidates	Lang Labor candidates	Single Tax candidates	Grouped Independent candidates	Ungrouped candidates
Adelaide (3)	K. W. Hilton; Duncan Menzies; J. Trego-Williams	**Martin Collaton**; **Herbert George**; E. McDonnell	**Bill Denny**; M. A. Dwyer; C. V. Wells	Doug Bardolph*; Bob Dale* ^{[1]} Tom Howard*			Tom Garland
Albert (2)	**Malcolm McIntosh***; **Frederick McMillan**				J. H. Groth; O. E. B. Kunoth		Tom Stott*
Alexandra (3)	**George Laffer***; **Herbert Hudd***; **Percy Heggaton***						
Barossa (3)	Henry Crosby*; Herbert Lyons*; Reginald Rudall	L. J. McMullin; Sid O'Flaherty; J. R. Whitfield	**Thomas Edwards**; Arthur McArthur ^{[2]} H. L. Zadow			Herbert Basedow*; Lindsay Yelland	
Burra Burra (3)	George Jenkins*; Archibald McDonald*; Alexander Melrose*	T. J. Canny; J. S. Marner; L. W. Wilcott	**Jack Critchley**; **Even George**; **Sydney McHugh**				
East Torrens (3)	Charles Abbott*; Walter Hamilton*; Frank Perry*	L. B. Fenwick; **Beasley Kearney**; C. H. S. Nicholls	H. J. Byrne; C. C. Cooke; H. B. A. Dankel				
Flinders (2)	Arthur Christian*; J. M. McDonald	L. E. Cash; T. D. Cash			**Edward Craigie***; J. P. Moore		A. H. Pfitzner
Murray (3)	George Cummins Morphett*; Thomas Playford IV*; Howard Shannon*	J. T. Cassidy; D. S. Fraser; H. E. Gersch	**Clement Collins**; **Robert Hunter**; **Frank Staniford**				
Newcastle (2)	R. D. McEwin; C. L. O. Sunman	James Beerworth*; Lindsay Riches*	**Thomas Butterfield**; **William Harvey**				
North Adelaide (2)	Victor Marra Newland*; Shirley Jeffries*	**Walter Warne**; F. H. Wilton	A. S. Horne; C. G. Johnson				
Port Adelaide (2)		James Stephens*; **Albert Thompson***		A. R. Dadleff; F. W. Hearne		E. A. Evans; A. J. W. Lewis	Charles Hayter; John Zwolsman
Port Pirie (2)		Andrew Lacey*; **John Fitzgerald***					
Stanley (2)	**Robert Nicholls***; **John Lyons***						
Sturt (3)	**Ernest Anthoney***; Henry Dunks*; Horace Hogben*	**Edgar Dawes**; T. W. Grealy; J. R. Hawke					
Victoria (2)	Ronald Hunt*; **Vernon Petherick***		Jim Corcoran; **Eric Shepherd**				Peter Crafter; A. F. Sutton
Wallaroo (2)		P. A. J. Chynoweth; J. D. Phillips	**John Pedler***; **Robert Richards***			C. T. Chapman; F. G. Filmer	
West Torrens (2)		H. N. Barnes; Harry Kneebone	**Alfred Blackwell***; **John McInnes***	J. F. Naylon; A. F. Sonnemann		Jules Langdon; C. W. Lloyd	T. C. McGillick
Wooroora (3)	**Richard Layton Butler***; **Archie Cameron***; **Samuel Dennison***						Maurice Collins; E. G. E. Willis; A. J. Parker
Yorke Peninsula (2)	**Edward Giles**; **Baden Pattinson***					Daniel Davies*; Hugh Hudson	

== Legislative Council ==
Sitting members are shown in bold text. Successful candidates are marked with an asterisk.

Electorate	Liberal and Country candidates	Official Labor candidates	Parliamentary Labor candidates	Grouped Independent candidates	Ungrouped candidates
Central District No. 1 (2)		Oscar Oates*; George Edwin Yates	T. J. Meers; **Stanley Whitford***	John Cooke ^{[3]} P. W. Rooney	A. O. R. Tapp
Central District No. 2 (2)	Hermann Homburg*; Collier Cudmore*				
Midland District (2)	Ernest William Castine*; **Walter Hannaford***				
Northern District (2)	**Percy Blesing***; Hartley Gladstone Hawkins*				
Southern District (2)	**Thomas McCallum***; **Harry Dove Young***				

== Notes ==
^{1} Bob Dale, the independent Labor MHA for Sturt, contested the 1933 election as a Lang Labor Party candidate for Adelaide.
^{2} Arthur McArthur, the incumbent PLP MHA for East Torrens, contested the 1933 election in Barossa.
^{3} John Herbert Cooke lost Liberal and Country League preselection to recontest Central District No. 2 and contested Central District No. 1 as an independent instead.
