= Members of the South Australian House of Assembly, 1930–1933 =

This is a list of members of the South Australian House of Assembly from 1930 to 1933, as elected at the 1930 state election:

Name	Party in 1930	Party in 1933	Electorate	Term of office
Ernest Anthoney	Liberal	LCL	Sturt	1921–1938
Frederick Birrell	Labor	PLP	North Adelaide	1921–1933
Alfred Blackwell	Labor	PLP	West Torrens	1918–1938
Richard Layton Butler	Liberal	LCL	Wooroora	1915–1918, 1921–1938
Hon Thomas Butterfield	Labor	PLP	Newcastle	1915–1917, 1918–1933
Archie Cameron	Country	LCL	Wooroora	1927–1934
Martin Collaton ^{[1]}	N/A (Lang Labor)	Labor	Adelaide	1931–1933
Clement Collins	Labor	PLP	Murray	1924–1933
George Cooke	Labor	PLP	Barossa	1924–1933
Edward Craigie	Single Tax League	Single Tax League	Flinders	1930–1941
Jack Critchley	Labor	PLP	Burra Burra	1930–1933
Bob Dale	Labor	Lang Labor	Sturt	1930–1938, 1944–1947
Edgar Dawes	Labor	Labor	Sturt	1930–1933
Hon Bill Denny	Labor	PLP	Adelaide	1900–1905, 1906–1933
Samuel Dennison	Country	LCL	Wooroora	1930–1938
Bert Edwards ^{[1]}	Labor	N/A	Adelaide	1917–1931
Thomas Edwards	Labor	PLP	Barossa	1930–1933
John Fitzgerald	Labor	Labor	Port Pirie	1918–1936
Even George	Labor	PLP	Burra Burra	1930–1933
Herbert George	Labor	Labor	Adelaide	1926–1933
Edward Giles	Liberal	LCL	Yorke Peninsula	1926–1933
William Harvey	Labor	PLP	Newcastle	1918–1933
Percy Heggaton	Liberal	LCL	Alexandra	1906–1915, 1923–1938
Lionel Hill	Labor	PLP	Port Pirie	1915–1917, 1918–1933
Leonard Hopkins	Labor	PLP	Barossa	1924–1927, 1930–1933
Herbert Hudd	Liberal	LCL	Alexandra	1912–1915, 1920–1938, 1941–1948
Robert Hunter	Labor	PLP	Murray	1930–1933
John Jonas	Labor	Labor	Port Adelaide	1927–1933
Beasley Kearney	Labor	Labor	East Torrens	1930–1933
George Laffer	Liberal	LCL	Alexandra	1913–1933
John Lyons	Liberal	LCL	Stanley	1926–1948
Arthur McArthur	Labor	PLP	East Torrens	1930–1933
Sydney McHugh	Labor	PLP	Burra Burra	1924–1927, 1930–1933, 1941–1944
John McInnes	Labor	PLP	West Torrens	1918–1950
Malcolm McIntosh	Liberal	LCL	Albert	1921–1959
Frederick McMillan	Liberal	LCL	Albert	1921–1933
James Moseley	Liberal	LCL	Flinders	1910–1933
Robert Nicholls	Liberal	LCL	Stanley	1915–1956
Frank Nieass	Labor	Labor	East Torrens	1930–1933, 1938–1941, 1944–1947
Baden Pattinson	Liberal	LCL	Yorke Peninsula	1930–1938, 1947–1965
John Pedler	Labor	PLP	Wallaroo	1918–1938
Vernon Petherick ^{[4]}	N/A (Liberal)	LCL	Victoria	1918–1924, 1932–1938, 1941–1945
Peter Reidy ^{[4]}	Liberal	N/A	Victoria	1915–1932
Robert Richards	Labor	PLP	Wallaroo	1918–1949
Eric Shepherd	Labor	PLP	Victoria	1924–1933
Frank Staniford	Labor	PLP	Murray	1924–1927, 1930–1933
Albert Thompson	Labor	Labor	Port Adelaide	1930–1946
Walter Warne	Labor	Labor	North Adelaide	1930–1933

^{1} Adelaide MHA Bert Edwards had his seat vacated for absence without leave on 23 June 1931. Lang Plan Campaign Committee candidate Martin Collaton won the resulting by-election on 25 July. He sat in parliament as a member of the new Lang Labor Party.
^{2} The Labor Party split in August 1931 over the Cabinet's support for the Premiers' Plan. The state conference of the party expelled the 21 MHAs who had supported it in parliament: Lionel Hill, Bill Denny, Robert Richards, John McInnes, Sydney McHugh, Eric Shepherd, Frank Staniford, Frederick Birrell, Alfred Blackwell, Thomas Butterfield, Clement Collins, Jack Critchley, Even George, William Harvey, Leonard Hopkins, Robert Hunter, Beasley Kearney, Arthur McArthur, John Pedler, Albert Thompson, and Walter Warne. They appealed the decision, but by November most had accepted their expulsion and formed a separate party, the Parliamentary Labor Party; the remnants of the caucus continued to sit as official Labor.
^{3} Sturt MHA Bob Dale was also expelled from the Labor Party in August 1931 for supporting the rival Lang Plan of New South Wales Premier Jack Lang. He subsequently sat as a member of the nascent Lang Labor Party.
^{4} Victoria MHA Peter Reidy died on 17 January 1932. Liberal candidate Vernon Petherick won the resulting by-election on 5 March.
^{5} The Lang Labor Party split in April 1932, with MHA Martin Collaton and a number of senior officials forming the Lang Australian Labor Party. The party merged into the official Labor Party in October.
^{6} The Liberal Federation merged with the SA branch of the Country Party to form the Liberal and Country League on 9 June 1932.
^{7} Two expelled MHAs, Albert Thompson and Beasley Kearney, were reinstated to the official Labor Party in June 1932 after an appeal to the party's federal executive. A third MHA, Walter Warne, was also readmitted by the time of the 1933 election.
