= Second Hill ministry =

- 55th ministry of South Australia

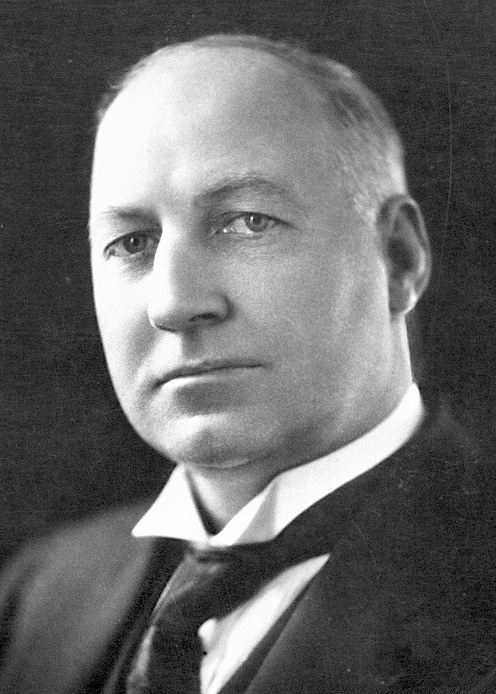
- Hill in 1936
- Date formed: 17 April 1930
- Date dissolved: 13 February 1933; 2 years, 302 days

People and organisations
- Monarch: King George VI
- Governor: Alexander Hore-Ruthven
- Premier: Lionel Hill
- No. of ministers: 6
- Member party: Labor; (until 13 August 1931); Parliamentary Labor; (from 13 August 1931)
- Status in legislature: Majority government; (1930–1931); Minority government; (1931–1933)
- Opposition party: Liberal
- Opposition leader: Richard Butler

History
- Election: 5 April 1930
- Legislature term: 27th
- Predecessor: First Butler ministry
- Successor: Richards ministry

The second Hill ministry was the 55th ministry of the Government of South Australia, led by the state's 30th premier Lionel Hill. Following Hill's support of the contentious Premiers' Plan, the entire ministry was expelled from the Labor Party.

== Arrangement ==
Party	Minister	Portrait	Offices
Labor (until 13 August 1931)	Lionel Hill (1881–1963) MHA for Port Pirie (1918–1933)		Premier (Note: The office of Premier was not officially recognised until 1965, however, the title was widely used to describe the leader of the majority party/coalition in Government since the beginning of responsible government in 1857.); Treasurer; Minister of Education
Parliamentary Labor (from 13 August 1931)	Lionel Hill (1881–1963) MHA for Port Pirie (1918–1933)		Premier; Treasurer; Minister of Education
Labor (until 13 August 1931)	Bill Denny (1872–1946) MHA for Adelaide (1902–1933)		Attorney-General; Minister of Local Government (until 30 October 1930); Minister of Railways
Parliamentary Labor (from 13 August 1931)	Bill Denny (1872–1946) MHA for Adelaide (1902–1933)		Attorney-General; Minister of Local Government (until 30 October 1930); Minister of Railways
Labor (until 13 August 1931)	Robert Richards (1885–1967) MHA for Wallaroo (1918–1949)		Commissioner of Crown Lands; Minister of Mines; Minister of Marine (from 30 October 1930); Minister of Labour and Employment (from 12 November 1931)
Parliamentary Labor (from 13 August 1931)	Robert Richards (1885–1967) MHA for Wallaroo (1918–1949)		Commissioner of Crown Lands; Minister of Mines; Minister of Marine (from 30 October 1930); Minister of Labour and Employment (from 12 November 1931)
Labor (until 13 August 1931)	John McInnes (1878–1950) MHA for West Torrens (1918–1938)		Commissioner of Public Works; Minister of Industry; Minister of Labour and Employment (until 12 November 1931)
Parliamentary Labor (from 13 August 1931)	John McInnes (1878–1950) MHA for West Torrens (1918–1938)		Commissioner of Public Works; Minister of Industry; Minister of Labour and Employment (until 12 November 1931)
Labor (until 13 August 1931)	James Jelley (1873–1954) MLC for Central District No. 1 (1915–1933)		Chief Secretary (until 30 October 1930); Minister of Marine (until 30 October 1930); Minister of Local Government (from 30 October 1930); Minister of Immigration (from 30 October 1930); Minister of Repatriation (from 30 October 1930); Minister of Irrigation (from 30 October 1930)
Parliamentary Labor (from 13 August 1931)	James Jelley (1873–1954) MLC for Central District No. 1 (1915–1933)		Chief Secretary (until 30 October 1930); Minister of Marine (until 30 October 1930); Minister of Local Government (from 30 October 1930); Minister of Immigration (from 30 October 1930); Minister of Repatriation (from 30 October 1930); Minister of Irrigation (from 30 October 1930)
Labor (until 13 August 1931)	Stanley Whitford (1878–1959) MLC for Central District No. 1 (1929–1941)		Chief Secretary (from 30 October 1930); Minister of Agriculture; Minister of Immigration (until 30 October 1930); Minister of Repatriation (until 30 October 1930); Minister of Irrigation (until 30 October 1930); Commissioner of Forest Lands (from 30 October 1930)
Parliamentary Labor (from 13 August 1931)	Stanley Whitford (1878–1959) MLC for Central District No. 1 (1929–1941)		Chief Secretary (from 30 October 1930); Minister of Agriculture; Minister of Immigration (until 30 October 1930); Minister of Repatriation (until 30 October 1930); Minister of Irrigation (until 30 October 1930); Commissioner of Forest Lands (from 30 October 1930)
