= Members of the South Australian House of Assembly, 1933–1938 =

This is a list of members of the South Australian House of Assembly from 1933 to 1938, as elected at the 1933 state election:

Name	Party	Electorate	Term of office
Charles Abbott	LCL	East Torrens	1933–1946
Ernest Anthoney	LCL	Sturt	1921–1938
Doug Bardolph	Lang Labor Party/Labor/Independent ^{[5]}^{[7]}	Adelaide	1933–1944
Dr Herbert Basedow ^{[3]}	Independent	Barossa	1927–1930, 1933
James Beerworth	Labor	Newcastle	1933–1938
Alfred Blackwell	PLP/Labor ^{[5]}	West Torrens	1918–1938
Hon Richard Layton Butler	LCL	Wooroora	1915–1918, 1921–1938
Archie Cameron ^{[6]}	LCL	Wooroora	1927–1934
Arthur Christian	LCL	Flinders	1933–1956
George Connor ^{[4]}	Independent	Alexandra	1934–1941
Edward Craigie	Single Tax League	Flinders	1930–1941
Henry Crosby	LCL	Barossa	1917–1924, 1924–1930, 1933–1938
Bob Dale	Lang Labor Party/SALLP/Labor ^{[2]}^{[5]}	Adelaide	1930–1938, 1944–1947
Daniel Davies	Independent	Yorke Peninsula	1933–1941
Samuel Dennison	LCL	Wooroora	1930–1938
Henry Dunks	LCL	Sturt	1933–1955
John Fitzgerald ^{[8]}	Labor	Port Pirie	1918–1936
Walter Hamilton	LCL	East Torrens	1917–1924, 1925–1930, 1933–1938
Percy Heggaton	LCL	Alexandra	1906–1915, 1923–1938
Horace Hogben	LCL	Sturt	1933–1938
Tom Howard	Lang Labor Party/SALLP/Labor ^{[2]}^{[5]}	Adelaide	1933–1938
Herbert Hudd	LCL	Alexandra	1912–1915, 1920–1938, 1941–1948
Ronald Hunt	LCL	Victoria	1933–1938
Shirley Jeffries	LCL	North Adelaide	1927–1930, 1933–1944, 1947–1953
Hon George Jenkins	LCL	Burra Burra	1918–1924, 1927–1930, 1933–1956
Andrew Lacey	Labor	Port Pirie	1933–1946
Hon George Laffer ^{[4]}	LCL	Alexandra	1913–1933
Herbert Lyons	LCL	Barossa	1933–1938
John Lyons	LCL	Stanley	1926–1948
Archibald McDonald	LCL	Burra Burra	1933–1947
Hon John McInnes	PLP/Labor ^{[5]}	West Torrens	1918–1950
Hon Malcolm McIntosh	LCL	Albert	1921–1959
Alexander Melrose	LCL	Burra Burra	1933–1941
George Morphett	LCL	Murray	1933–1938
Victor Newland	LCL	North Adelaide	1933–1938
Hon Robert Nicholls	LCL	Stanley	1915–1956
Baden Pattinson	LCL	Yorke Peninsula	1930–1938, 1947–1965
John Pedler	PLP/Labor ^{[5]}	Wallaroo	1918–1938
Vernon Petherick	LCL	Victoria	1918–1924, 1932–1938, 1941–1945
Frank Perry	LCL	East Torrens	1933–1938
Thomas Playford	LCL	Murray	1933–1968
Robert Richards	PLP/Labor ^{[5]}	Wallaroo	1918–1949
Lindsay Riches	Labor	Newcastle	1933–1970
Albert Robinson ^{[6]}	Independent	Wooroora	1915–1924, 1934–1943
Reginald Rudall ^{[3]}	LCL	Barossa	1933–1944
Howard Shannon	LCL	Murray	1933–1968
James Stephens	Labor	Port Adelaide	1933–1959
Tom Stott	Independent	Albert	1933–1970
Albert Thompson	Labor	Port Adelaide	1930–1946
William Threadgold ^{[8]}	Labor	Port Pirie	1937–1938

^{1} The governing Labor Party had split into three separate factions prior to the 1933 state election due to disputes over the handling of the Great Depression. Robert Richards, the Labor Premier going into the election, had been expelled from the party along with much of the parliamentary caucus for supporting the Premiers' Plan. Richards and his supporters accordingly contested the election under the banner of the Parliamentary Labor Party. The official ALP, consisting of the party administration, several dissident MHAs and much of the party grassroots, ran a mostly new slate of candidates. A number of MHAs and party officials also formed a third faction, the Lang Labor Party, associated with the ideas of New South Wales Premier Jack Lang. All three factions won seats in the election.
^{2} Two of the three Lang Labor Party MHAs, Bob Dale and Tom Howard left the party in 1933 after falling out with leader Doug Bardolph and formed their own party, the South Australian Lang Labor Party (SALLP).
^{3} Barossa independent MHA Dr Herbert Basedow died on 4 June 1933. LCL candidate Reginald Rudall won the resulting by-election on 8 July.
^{4} Alexandra LCL MHA George Laffer died on 7 December 1933. Independent candidate George Connor won the resulting by-election on 10 February 1934.
^{5} The four Labor factions reunited in June 1934 after an extended reconciliation process. All members of the four factions rejoined the official Labor Party as a result.
^{6} Wooroora LCL MHA Archie Cameron resigned on 7 August 1934 in order to contest the federal seat of Barker at the 1934 federal election. Independent candidate Albert Robinson won the resulting by-election on 29 September.
^{7} Adelaide MHA and former Lang Labor Party leader Doug Bardolph was expelled from the Labor Party in 1935. He served out the remainder of his term as an independent.
^{8} Port Pirie Labor MHA John Fitzgerald died on 22 December 1936. Labor candidate William Threadgold was elected to the vacancy unopposed on 3 March 1937.
