= Richards ministry =

The Richards ministry was the 56th ministry of the Government of South Australia, led by Robert Richards. It commenced on 13 February 1933, following the resignation of Lionel Hill. Hill had been elected Premier as Labor Party leader at the 1930 election, but had been expelled along with all his ministers in the 1931 Labor split, formed the splinter Parliamentary Labor Party, and continued to govern as a minority government. Hill abruptly resigned in early 1933 after appointing himself Agent General in London, and Richards led the PLP ministry into the 1933 state election, at which they were badly defeated; he was succeeded by the second Butler ministry on 18 April 1933.

Office	Minister
Premier; Treasurer; Commissioner of Crown Lands; Minister of Mines; Minister of Marine; Minister of Irrigation; Minister of Repatriation	Robert Richards MHA
Attorney General; Minister of Railways	Bill Denny MHA
Commissioner of Public Works; Minister of Industry	John McInnes MHA
Minister of Education; Minister of Local Government; Minister of Immigration; Minister of Labour and Employment	Frank Staniford MHA
Chief Secretary; Minister of Agriculture; Minister of Forest Lands	Stanley Whitford MLC
