= Sid O'Flaherty =

Australian politician (1886–1967)

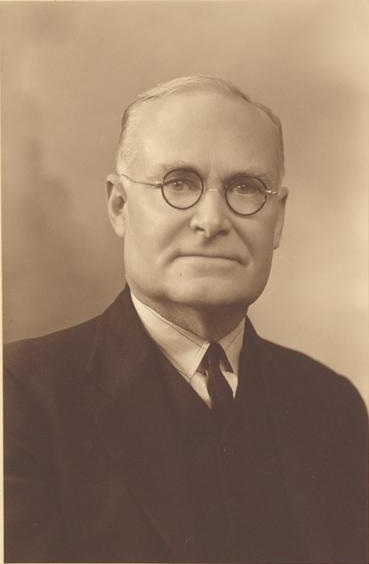

Senator for South Australia
- In office 1 July 1944 – 30 June 1962

Personal details
- Born: 12 July 1886 Silverton, New South Wales
- Died: 18 November 1967 (aged 81) Adelaide, South Australia
- Party: Labor

Sidney Wainman O'Flaherty (2 July 1886 – 18 November 1967) was an Australian politician. He was an Australian Labor Party member of the Australian Senate for South Australia from 1944 to 1962. He had previously served as a Labor member of the South Australian House of Assembly from 1918 to 1921.

== Early life and career ==
Born in Silverton, New South Wales, his family soon moved to Adelaide, where he was raised. He attended the Adelaide School of Mines before becoming an architect and accountant, and later secretary of the Miscellaneous Workers' Union.

== Political career ==
In 1918, he was elected to the South Australian House of Assembly as the Labor member for Murray, serving until 1921.

In the 1931 Labor split in the wake of the Great Depression, O'Flaherty became associated with the splinter Lang Labor Party, which supported the ideas of Premier of New South Wales Jack Lang. He unsuccessfully contested the 1931 federal election for Lang Labor, but resigned in April 1932 along with a number of other figures, including sole MP Martin Collaton, who were disgruntled with the South Australian party leadership. They formed the Lang Australian Labor Party with O'Flaherty as party president, but the new party merged into the official Labor Party in September. He contested the 1933 state election, standing for the official Labor Party in the seat of Barossa, but was unsuccessful. He was again unsuccessful as the Labor candidate for Thebarton in 1941.

In 1943 he became President of the South Australian Labor Party, but later that year he was elected to the Australian Senate as a Labor Senator for South Australia.

== Retirement and death ==
He held the seat until his retirement in 1961. O'Flaherty died in 1967.
