= Jack Critchley =

Australian politician (1892–1964)

Jack Critchley JP
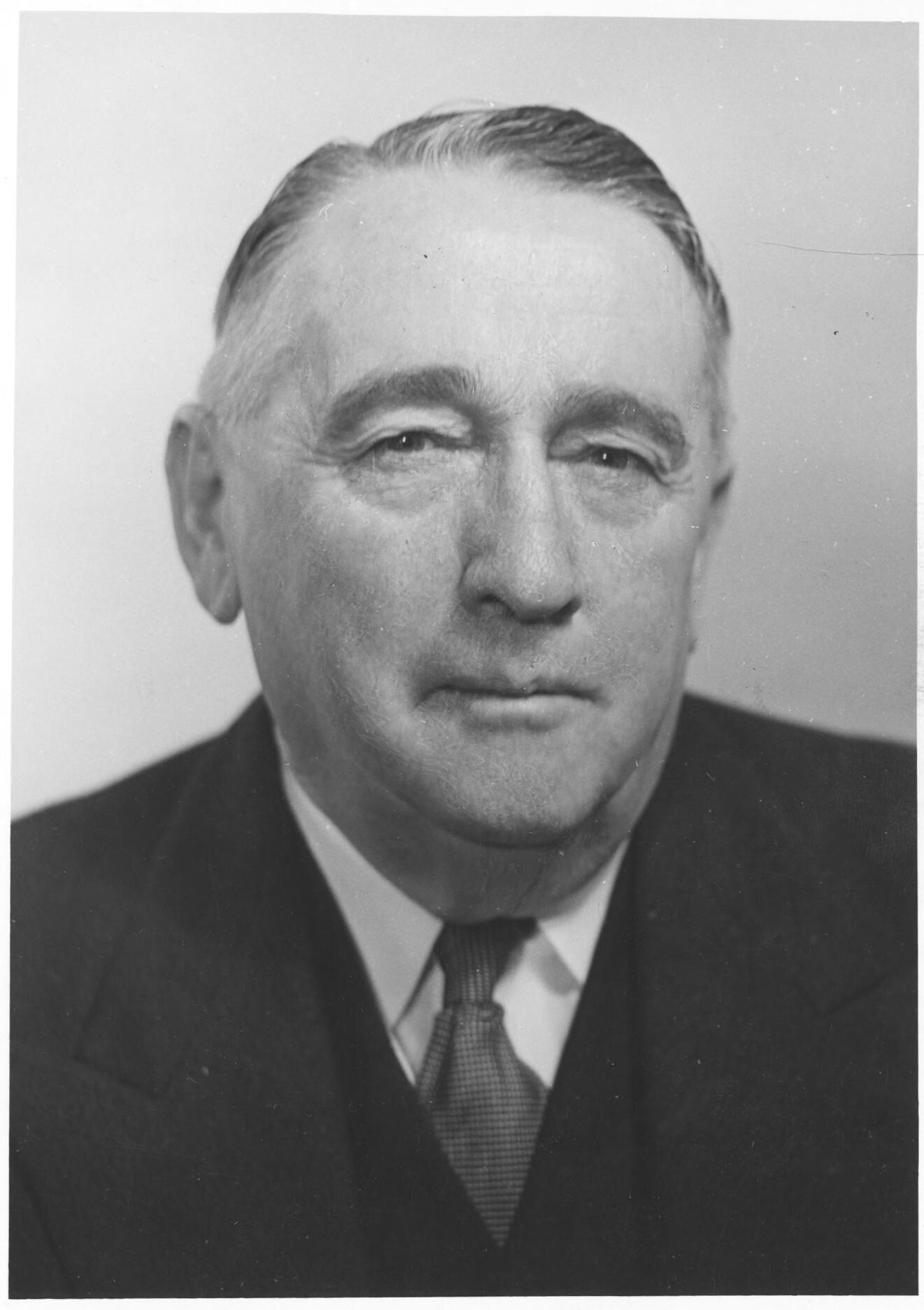
- Critchley c. 1950

Senator for South Australia
- In office 1 July 1947 – 30 June 1959
- Preceded by: George McLeay
- Succeeded by: Jim Toohey

Member of the South Australian House of Assembly for Burra Burra
- In office 5 April 1930 – 7 April 1933
- Preceded by: New seat
- Succeeded by: George Jenkins

Personal details
- Born: 18 April 1892 Callington, South Australia
- Died: 27 April 1964 (aged 72) Glengowrie, South Australia
- Party: Labor
- Spouse: Alice Cave (m. 1919)
- Occupation: Wheelwright; soldier; carpenter; union organiser; public servant; politician

Military service
- Allegiance: Australia
- Branch/service: Australian Imperial Force
- Years of service: 1916–1918
- Rank: Private
- Unit: 10th Battalion
- Battles/wars: World War I

John Owen Critchley, JP (18 April 1892 – 27 April 1964) was an Australian politician who served as a Labor member of the South Australian House of Assembly from 1930 to 1933 and then the Australian Senate from 1947 to 1959. Born at Callington in the Adelaide Hills of South Australia, and schooled at Sunnybrae and Petersburg (later Peterborough), Critchley completed an apprenticeship as a wheelwright. He was then dismissed for forming a branch of his union. He was a founding member and also served twelve years on the executive committee of the Amalgamated Coach Rolling Stock Makers' and Wheelwrights' Society—later the Australian Coachmakers Employees' Federation then the Vehicle Builders Employees' Federation. He briefly served with the South Australia-raised 10th Battalion on the Western Front in France and Belgium during World War I, but was repatriated as medically unfit, suffering from a neck condition.

Critchley returned to Peterborough and worked for South Australian Railways as a carpenter. He joined the Labor Party and was active in his local community, including serving two terms on the town council. He successfully ran as a Labor candidate for the seat of Burra Burra in the South Australian House of Assembly in the 1930 South Australian state election, but was defeated in 1933 after the Labor Party split over austerity measures, during which he was expelled from the party. He was readmitted to the party the following year, and worked as a vehicle registration clerk, and then managed clothing rations during World War II. In 1946, Critchley was elected to the Australian Senate, and served until 1958, being re-elected twice. He was opposition whip in the Senate from 1950 to 1957, responsible for maintaining party discipline. As a senator, Critchley advocated for returned servicemen and conservation, and was a fierce supporter of Labor's banking policies. He promoted a national perspective on a range of issues, including railway reform and the flying of the Australian flag, and was a strong opponent of state parochialism. Illness caused him to step down as opposition whip in 1957, and he did not contest the 1958 election, retiring in June 1959. When he died five years later, he was described by a fellow senator as "a true Labour man" who was "always ready to fight injustice and to resist it".

== Early life ==
John Owen Critchley was born on 18 April 1892 at Callington in the Adelaide Hills of South Australia, the son of labourer Patrick Critchley and his wife Julia née Burns. Known as Jack, Critchley had two younger brothers, Henry and Michael. The family moved to Gumbowie, where Patrick worked as a railway packer at the station on the Petersburg railway line. During this time, Jack attended school at Sunnybrae near Petersburg, and at Petersburg. He left school aged 13 as he felt his parents were struggling financially to keep him at school. He commenced a four-year apprenticeship as a wheelwright with the Schubert family in Murray Bridge in 1906. At the end of his term, the family dismissed him because he had formed a local branch of the Amalgamated Coach Rolling Stock Makers' and Wheelwrights' Society – which later evolved into the Australian Coachmakers Employees' Federation then the Vehicle Builders Employees' Federation. Critchley was a founding member of the federation, and served on its executive committee for twelve years. He then moved to Maitland on the Yorke Peninsula looking for work.

== World War I ==
Critchley enlisted in the Australian Imperial Force at Adelaide on 14 January 1916. He was allocated to the 16th reinforcements to the South Australia-raised 10th Battalion. Following training in Adelaide, he embarked aboard the HMAT A9 Shropshire at Outer Harbor on 25 March. After stopping in Egypt, his reinforcement draft went on to the UK for further training, and Critchley joined the 10th Battalion in France on 25 August.

When Critchley joined the battalion, it had just endured the Battles of Pozières and Mouquet Farm, during which it had suffered severe casualties. The unit entrained for Belgium and served a week in the trenches at Hill 60 near Ypres in late September before returning to France. The battalion was on fatigue duties at Bernafay Wood on 2 November, when Critchley was evacuated to a hospital. Further evacuated to the UK, he was admitted to a hospital on 15 November with torticollis, or wry neck. He was discharged from the hospital on 25 November and was then transferred through several convalescent and personnel depots. The neck condition was persistent, which led to him being embarked on the hospital ship Port Lyttleton on 19 October 1917. He disembarked in Adelaide on 11 December and was discharged as medically unfit on 25 January 1918. His brothers Henry and Michael also enlisted and were both killed in action during the war.

== Political career ==
=== Local and state politics ===
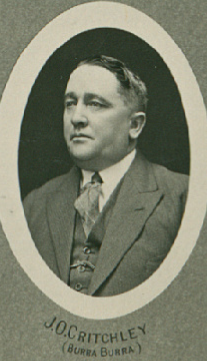
Critchley c. 1930

Upon returning from the war, Critchley gained employment with the South Australian Railways (SAR) at Peterborough—which had been renamed from Petersburg during the war—as a carpenter, and married Alice Cave on 6 August 1919. Joining the Australian Labor Party (ALP), he became president and then secretary of the local party committee, and was later the assistant secretary of the electorate committee for the federal Division of Grey. The ALP was founded by trade unions and as of 2025 continues to have close ties to the labour movement in Australia. Critchley was an unsuccessful candidate for the South Ward in the 1922 town council election, but he later served two terms as a councillor from 1923 to 1924 and 1928 to 1929, though he was unsuccessful in his bid for mayor in 1925. He was on the board of the local hospital, was president of the local sub-branch of the Returned Soldiers' Association (later the Returned Sailors' and Soldiers' Imperial League of Australia), and was a justice of the peace.

At the 1930 state election held on 5 April, Critchley contested the three-member seat of Burra Burra in the South Australian House of Assembly as an ALP candidate, and was elected first, alongside two other ALP candidates, with Critchley receiving 41 per cent of the votes. The election saw the ALP under the leadership of Lionel Hill resoundingly defeat the Liberal Federation under Richard Layton Butler. Labor had committed to addressing high unemployment, which Critchley had described during a speech at Jamestown on 27 March as "the biggest curse—second only to war". Critchley's first speech to the assembly urged action on the provision of rations to unemployed men in country towns. He also praised government protection offered to railway employees providing evidence to the royal commission on railways, and was critical of the reforms to the railways by the American Chief Commissioner of SAR, William Alfred Webb.

Critchley was sensitive to the situation faced by workers during the Great Depression, deriding as "wretched" the call of the conservative opposition for "work for rations", and sought a tax on wages for employers and employees alike of three shillings. He also argued for fertile land in the south east of the state to be compulsorily acquired and used to settle unemployed people, sought to reduce the number of members of the assembly and sought to abolish the state upper house, the Legislative Council. In 1931, splits within the ALP were inflamed over the Premiers' Plan – a deflationary and austere economic policy which sought to combat the effects of the Great Depression. When the Hill cabinet agreed to the plan, a schism occurred in the ALP which hardened the divisions. The ALP state council expelled Hill, Critchley and others in August, and Critchley became a member of the Parliamentary Labor Party – also known as the Premiers' Plan Labor Party. This party retained government in a minority, with Lang Labor and state ALP members sitting separately. Critchley was a member of the royal commission on betting in 1932–1933.

Critchley ran for re-election in Burra Burra in the 1933 state election held on 8 April, but the divisions in the Labor movement saw the Parliamentary Labor Party swept from power, with Critchley defeated, attracting only 21.8 per cent of the votes. He and the other members of the Parliamentary Labor Party were readmitted to the ALP after a "unity conference" in 1934, and Critchley became president of the electorate committee for the state seat of Goodwood, for which he ran unsuccessfully for preselection in 1938. Following his election loss, Critchley worked as a motor registration clerk. During World War II, he worked in Adelaide as a manager of clothes rationing for industrial occupations, which he later described as "a most unpleasant task". During this period he was active in establishing sub-branches of the ALP in the suburbs of Adelaide.

=== Federal politics ===
Critchley was an ALP candidate for the Australian Senate in the 1946 Australian federal election, in the second position on the ALP senate ticket after Fred Beerworth, and was duly elected. Critchley's six-year senate term commenced on 1 July 1947. The 1946 election resulted in the re-election of the ALP, which was in power since 1941. Critchley's first speech in the Senate urged haste in settling returned servicemen on agricultural land, sought the implementation of soil and water conservation schemes, supported social services and child immigration, and lauded the Chifley government's plans to standardise the railways and improve the road transport system. Having previously served on the state parliamentary committee assessing the value of land for settlement, he was critical of the long delays caused by differences between the federal Labor government and the conservative government in South Australia. He was a member of the standing orders committee from 1947 to 1949. On 10 December 1949, in the wake of its attempt to nationalise the banks, the federal ALP government of Ben Chifley was defeated by the Liberal–Country coalition, and went into opposition. On 1 July 1950, Critchley was appointed opposition whip in the Senate—responsible for managing business and maintaining party discipline, a position he retained until September 1957.

In his speeches to Parliament, Critchley advocated for returned service personnel, and expressed concern for the mental health needs of those suffering from what was then known as "war neurosis"—now known as combat stress reaction. He urged the inclusion of psychiatric wards in military hospitals, and argued it should not be necessary for returned service personnel to prove their mental health condition was war-caused in order to be admitted to such wards. When these developments occurred interstate but had not yet happened in South Australia, he closely questioned the then Minister for Repatriation, Senator Walter Cooper. Critchley was appointed to the joint committee on war gratuity in 1951.

During the Cold War period, many ALP members, most but not all of them Catholic, became alarmed at what they saw as the growing power of the Communist Party of Australia within the country's trade unions. These members attempted to combat this alleged infiltration. However, despite the fact that Critchley was a practising Catholic, he opposed the Communist Party Dissolution Bill when it was presented by the government of Prime Minister Robert Menzies in 1950. Despite strong Catholic opposition to the ALP's banking policies, including the additional powers granted to the Commonwealth Bank and the push to nationalise the banks, Critchley remained a vehement supporter of these policies. In 1951 he was a member of the select committee on the Commonwealth Bank Bill 1950 (No. 2), on which government senators refused to serve. When the bill was defeated in the Senate, Menzies called a double dissolution election.

Held on 28 April 1951, the election resulted in the ALP losing control of the Senate. Critchley was in third position on the ALP senate ticket for South Australia, and was the sixth of ten candidates elected. He was a member of the House Committee from 21 November 1951 to 4 November 1955. At the 1953 Australian Senate election, Critchley was first on the ALP senate ticket, and was the first of five candidates elected. According to his family, when the ALP split over the issue of communism in 1955, Critchley refused to join the Catholic-dominated breakaway Australian Labor Party (Anti-Communist)—later the Democratic Labour Party—despite being offered the position of party leader in the Senate. In 1956, Critchley and his South Australian Labor colleague Senator John Ryan advocated for national serviceman Private F. S. Luxton, who had been hospitalised for three months after the expiry of his training obligation period, to be compensated for the physical disabilities he had suffered. In November 1957, the Menzies government brought fourteen banking bills to the evenly-matched Senate, and despite his ill health, Critchley attended the chamber to ensure the bills were defeated.

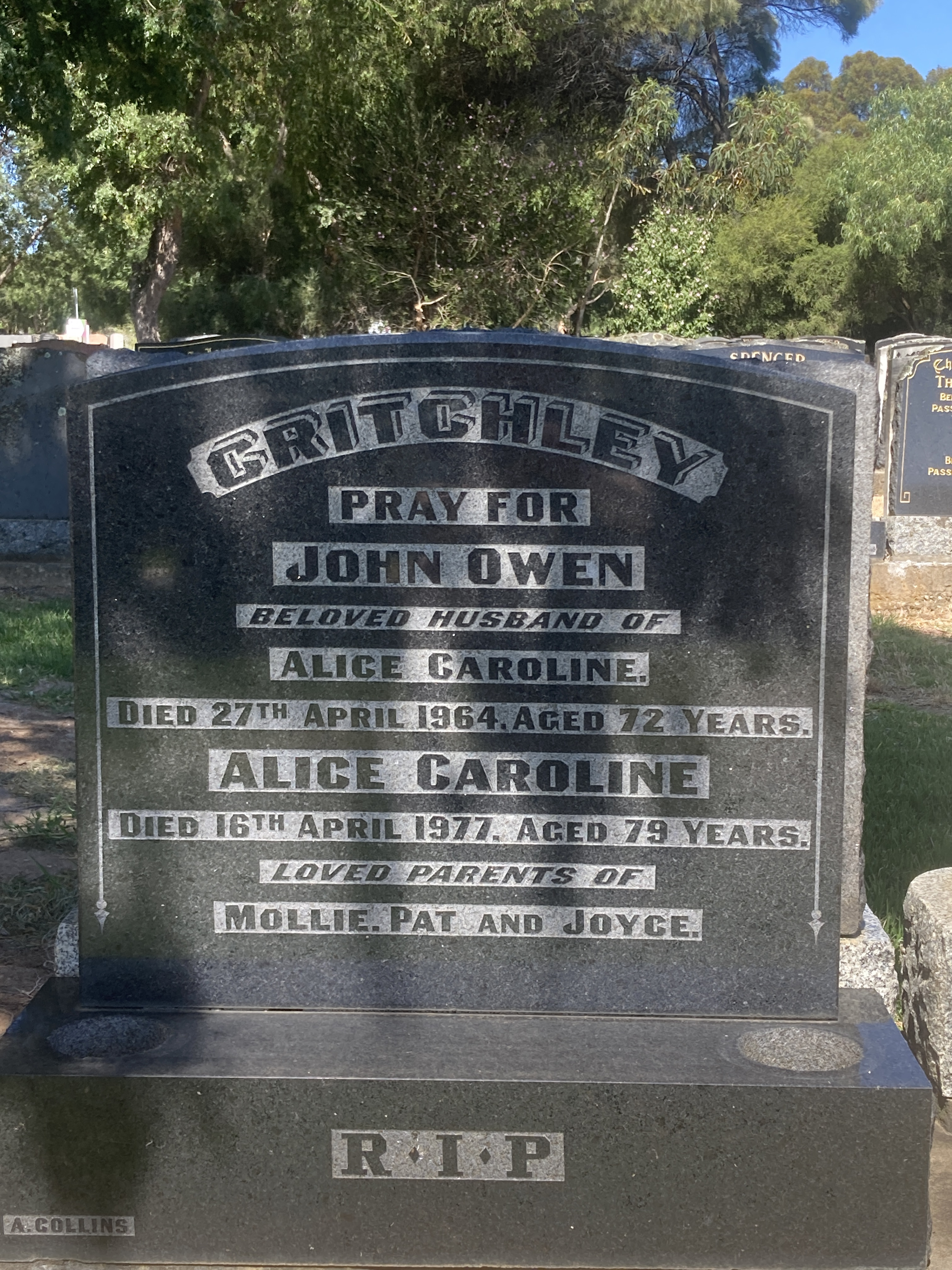
Jack Critchley's grave at Centennial Park Cemetery, Pasadena, South Australia

Long periods of absence from the Senate due to illness in his latter years resulted in his resignation as opposition whip in September 1957, and he did not contest the 1958 Australian federal election. He was replaced in the first position on the ALP ticket by Jim Toohey, who was elected. Critchley retired from the Senate on 30 June 1959 at the conclusion of his term.

== Death and legacy ==
Critchley died at his home in Glengowrie on 27 April 1964 at the age of 72, and was buried with Catholic rites at the Centennial Park Cemetery in Pasadena. Throughout his political career, Critchley consistently advanced a national perspective on issues, including the use of the Australian flag rather than the Union Jack, the national coordination of transport infrastructure and systems, and environment conservation. He also opposed state parochialism. A delegate to the Empire Parliamentary Association Conference in 1949, three years later he welcomed a proposal for a joint foreign affairs committee. The Tasmanian Senator Nick McKenna described Critchley as:

"a man of the most outstanding personal qualities... a true Labour man and a true Australian... saturated with the principles and the traditions of the party... always ready to fight injustice and to resist it" who "magnificently upheld the party's traditions of mateship and loyalty".

== Footnotes ==
South Australian House of Assembly
Preceded by New seat	Member for Burra Burra; 1930–1933; Served alongside: George Jenkins and Sydney McHugh	Succeeded by George Jenkins
Parliament of Australia
Preceded by George McLeay	Senator for South Australia; 1946–1957	Succeeded by Jim Toohey
