= Members of the South Australian Legislative Council, 1933–1938 =

This is a list of members of the South Australian Legislative Council from 1933 to 1938

This term was extended to 5 years to maintain synchronism with the Legislative Assembly elections.

Name	District	Party	Term expiry	Time in office
Joseph Anderson	Central No. 1	Independent	1938	1931–1944
Percy Blesing	Northern	LCL	1941	1924–1949
Ernest William Castine	Midland	LCL	1941	1933–1947
Frank Condon	Central No. 1	Labor	1938	1928–1961
John Cowan	Southern	LCL	1938	1910–1944
Collier Cudmore	Central No. 2	LCL	1941	1933–1959
Walter Gordon Duncan	Midland	LCL	1938	1918–1962
Sir David Gordon	Midland	LCL	1938	1913–1944
Walter Hannaford	Midland	LCL	1941	1912–1941
William Humphrey Harvey ^{[3]}	Central No. 2	LCL	1938	1915–1935
Hartley Gladstone Hawkins	Northern	LCL	1941	1933–1939
Sir Edward Holden ^{[3]}	Central No. 2	LCL	1938	1935–1947
Hermann Homburg	Central No. 2	LCL	1941	1933–1941
Thomas McCallum	Southern	LCL	1941	1920–1938
Lyell McEwin ^{[2]}	Northern	LCL	1938	1934–1975
William Morrow ^{[2]}	Northern	LCL	1938	1915–1934
Reuben Cranstoun Mowbray	Southern	LCL	1938	1932–1938
Oscar Oates	Central No. 1	Labor	1941	1933–1951
George Ritchie	Northern	LCL	1938	1924–1944
Henry Tassie	Central No. 2	LCL	1938	1918–1938
Stanley Whitford	Central No. 1	PLP/Independent ^{[1]}	1941	1929–1941
Harry Dove Young	Southern	LCL	1941	1927–1941

^{1} The Labor Party had split into three different factions prior to the 1933 state election due to disputes over the handling of the Great Depression. In the Legislative Council, Stanley Whitford was re-elected for the Parliamentary Labor Party, which consisted of most of the former Cabinet and their supporters, who had been expelled from official Labor. Oscar Oates, a new official Labor candidate, was elected, and Frank Condon, not up for re-election, remained with official Labor. Whitford ceased to be a member of the PLP, renounced socialism and declared himself an "individualist" in March 1934. He was the only member of the splinter Labor parties in either house who were re-elected in 1933 to not be readmitted to the Labor Party, and continued as an independent for the rest of his career.
^{2} LCL MLC William Morrow died on 3 July 1934. Lyell McEwin won the resulting by-election on 20 October.
^{3} LCL MLC William Humphrey Harvey died on 6 November 1935. Edward Holden won the resulting by-election on 14 December.
