= Kunoth =

Kunoth is a surname. Notable people with this name include:

- Amelia Kunoth (c. 1880s – 1984), Australian aboriginal woman, station developer
- Angela Kunoth (born 1963), German mathematician
- Oscar Kunoth, Australian politician, ran in 1933 South Australian state election: Albert
- Rosalie Kunoth-Monks (1937–2022), Australian actress, activist, and politician
