= First Hill ministry =

The First Hill ministry was the 53rd ministry of the Government of South Australia, led by Lionel Hill of the Labor Party. It commenced on 28 August 1926, following the resignation of Labor Premier John Gunn. It was succeeded by the first Butler ministry on 8 April 1927 following the Labor defeat at the 1927 state election.

Office	Minister
Premier; Treasurer; Commissioner of Education	Lionel Hill MHA
Attorney General; Minister of Housing; Minister of Irrigation; Minister of Repatriation	Bill Denny MHA
Commissioner of Crown Lands; Minister of Agriculture	Thomas Butterfield MHA
Commissioner of Public Works; Minister of Railways; Minister of Industry	John McInnes MHA
Chief Secretary	James Jelley MLC
Minister of Mines; Minister of Marine; Minister of Immigration; Minister of Local Government	Andrew Kirkpatrick MLC
