= Australian Labor Party split =

Australian Labor Party split may refer to:

- Australian Labor Party split of 1916, which followed a disagreement on proposed conscription in Australia during World War I
- Australian Labor Party split of 1931, which followed from disagreement regarding how the party was handling the Australian Great Depression
- Australian Labor Party split of 1955, which involved a disagreement over the party's position toward communism
