= Bill Denny =

Australian politician (1872–1946)

The Honourable Bill Denny MC
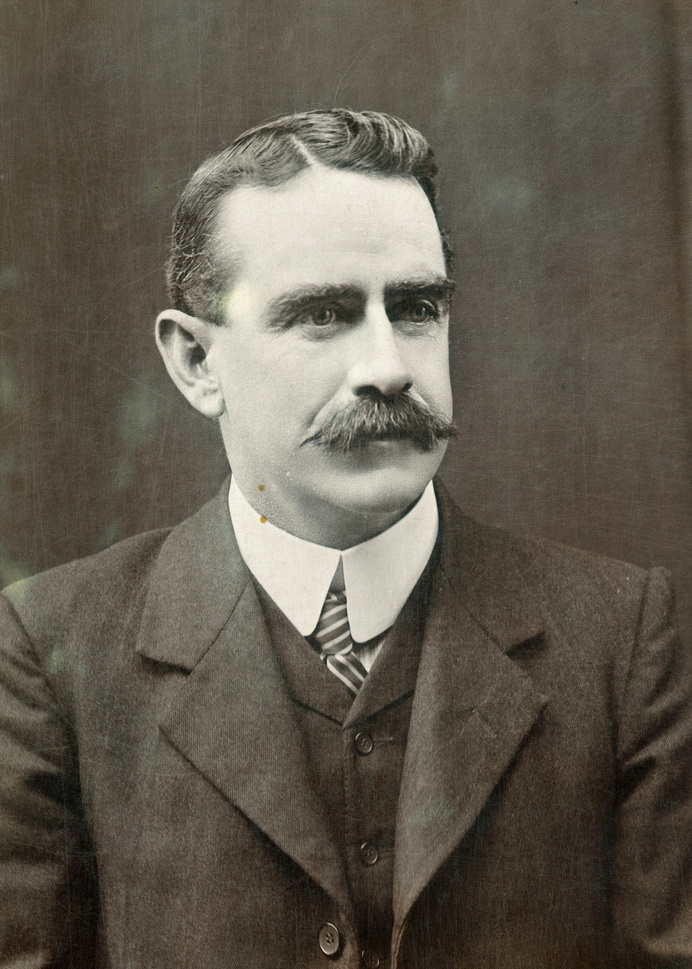
- Denny in c. 1910

29th Attorney-General of South Australia
- In office 17 April 1930 – 18 April 1933
- Premier: Lionel Hill; Robert Richards
- Preceded by: Hermann Homburg
- Succeeded by: Shirley Jeffries
- In office 16 April 1924 – 8 April 1927
- Premier: John Gunn
- Preceded by: Hermann Homburg
- Succeeded by: Hermann Homburg
- In office 3 June 1910 – 17 February 1912
- Premier: John Verran
- Preceded by: Hermann Homburg
- Succeeded by: Hermann Homburg

Member of the South Australian House of Assembly for Adelaide
- In office 3 November 1906 – 7 April 1933
- In office 3 May 1902 – 26 May 1905

Member of the South Australian House of Assembly for West Adelaide
- In office 17 March 1900 – 2 May 1902

Personal details
- Born: William Joseph Denny; 6 December 1872 Adelaide, South Australia
- Died: 2 May 1946 (aged 73) Norwood, South Australia
- Resting place: West Terrace Cemetery, Adelaide
- Party: Independent liberal (1900–1905); United Labor (1906–1917); Labor (1917–1931); Parliamentary Labor (1931–1933)
- Spouse: Winefride Mary Leahy (m. 1920)
- Relations: William Thomas Denny (grandson)
- Parents: Thomas Joseph Denny (father); Annie Denny (née Dwyer) (mother)
- Education: Christian Brothers College, Adelaide; University of Adelaide
- Profession: Journalist; solicitor; soldier

Military service
- Branch/service: Australian Army
- Years of service: 1915–1919
- Rank: Captain
- Unit: 9th Light Horse Regiment; 5th Divisional Ammunition Column; 1st Divisional Artillery; AIF Administrative Headquarters
- Battles/wars: World War I (Western Front)
- Awards: Military Cross

William Joseph Denny MC (6 December 1872 – 2 May 1946) was an Australian journalist, lawyer, politician and decorated soldier who held the South Australian House of Assembly seats of West Adelaide from 1900 to 1902 and then Adelaide from 1902 to 1905 and again from 1906 to 1933. After an unsuccessful candidacy as a United Labor Party (ULP) member in 1899, he was elected as an "independent liberal" in a by-election in 1900. He was re-elected in 1902, but defeated in 1905. The following year, he was elected as a ULP candidate, and retained his seat for that party (the Australian Labor Party from 1917) until 1931. Along with the rest of the cabinet, he was ejected from the Australian Labor Party in 1931, and was a member of the Parliamentary Labor Party until his electoral defeat at the hands of a Lang Labor Party candidate in 1933.

Denny served as Attorney-General of South Australia and Minister for the Northern Territory in the government led by John Verran (1910–12), during which he drafted and led several important legislative reforms, including housing reforms assisting workers to purchase homes, and a law enabling women to practise law in South Australia for the first time. In August 1915, Denny enlisted in the First Australian Imperial Force to serve in World War I, initially as a trooper in the 9th Light Horse Regiment. After being commissioned in 1916, he served in the 5th Division Artillery and 1st Divisional Artillery on the Western Front. He was awarded the Military Cross in September 1917 after he was wounded while leading a convoy into forward areas near Ypres, and ended the war as a captain.

He was again Attorney-General in the Labor governments led by John Gunn (1924–26), Lionel Hill (1930–33) and Robert Richards (1933), and held other portfolios in those governments, including housing, irrigation and repatriation. He continued his reform of the housing sector, being a key proponent of the Thousand Homes Scheme which aimed to provide affordable housing, particularly for returned soldiers and their families, and members of lower income groups. Denny published two memoirs of his military service, and when he died in 1946 aged 73, he was accorded a state funeral.

== Early life ==
William Joseph Denny was born in Adelaide, South Australia, on 6 December 1872, one of three children of Thomas Joseph Denny, a publican, and his wife Annie (née Dwyer). He attended Christian Brothers College, Adelaide, then worked as a weather clerk at the General Post Office, Adelaide, under the Postmaster General, Sir Charles Todd. According to a contemporary source, in 1893 he became the editor of the Catholic The Southern Cross newspaper, which published news about and for the Catholic community of South Australia. A more recent source states he commenced as editor of The Southern Cross in 1896. He replaced James O'Loghlin, who later became a United Labor Party (ULP) senator for South Australia. Denny was a councillor of the Adelaide City Council from 1898, representing Grey Ward. During his early twenties he was active in the literary and debating societies of Adelaide, was Chairman of the Christian Brothers Old Collegians Association, and captain of two city rowing clubs. He unsuccessfully contested the two-member seat of West Adelaide in the 1899 South Australian colonial election as a ULP candidate, gaining 27.7 per cent of the vote.

When a by-election was held for West Adelaide on 17 March 1900, Denny was elected to the single vacancy created by the resignation of the former Premier of South Australia, Charles Kingston. He ran as an "independent liberal" candidate, gaining 66.8 per cent of the vote. Prior to the 1902 state election the electoral district of West Adelaide was abolished. Denny contested the new four-member electoral district of Adelaide, and was elected second in the count with 14.3 per cent of the votes cast. He was defeated at the 1905 state election, gaining only 9.9 per cent of the votes. The following year, having abandoned his former liberalism, he contested the seat of Adelaide at the state election as a ULP candidate, and was elected first, receiving 19.3 per cent of the votes cast. He was again returned first at the 1910 state election, after which the ULP led by John Verran formed the first Labor government of South Australia on 3 June. Having begun studying law at the University of Adelaide in 1903, Denny was articled to J.R. Anderson, KC, and was admitted as a solicitor in the Supreme Court of South Australia in 1908.

== Attorney-General ==
Denny was appointed Attorney-General of South Australia and Minister controlling the Northern Territory on 3 June 1910. After conducting negotiations with the Commonwealth Government, he relinquished his ministerial responsibility for the Northern Territory on 31 December 1910, when its administration was transferred to the Commonwealth. During his time as Attorney-General, Denny drafted and led several important legislative reforms. These included the Advances for Homes Act 1910, which allowed for 80 per cent of the value of a property to be advanced to a worker at 4.5 per cent interest over 36.5 years. In his speeches Denny highlighted that many workers were faced with high rents and poor conditions. He also sponsored the Female Law Practitioners Act 1911, which enabled women to practise law in South Australia for the first time. Tall, with "long, spindly legs", Denny was a favourite of cartoonists.

Verran called an election in February 1912, and the ULP were defeated by the Liberal Union, although Denny was again returned first in the seat of Adelaide with 15.8 per cent of votes cast. He became a member of the University of Adelaide Council in April 1912, as a representative of the Parliament. In 1913, a referendum to fix the closing time of licensed premises was proposed by the ULP. Even after the governing Liberal Union agreed to the conduct of the referendum at the next state election, Denny attacked them, claiming that they had no intention of implementing the outcome of the referendum if they were re-elected. Denny was returned unopposed at the March 1915 state election.

== World War I ==
Denny enlisted in the Australian Imperial Force (AIF) on 17 August 1915 at the age of 43, initially as a trooper. Before departing overseas, Denny had always been an advocate of conscription. He was later commissioned as a second lieutenant in the 9th Light Horse Regiment. While in Egypt, he transferred to the divisional artillery of the 5th Division, which then shipped to France, and he was promoted to lieutenant in June 1916. In January 1917, despite his previous stance on conscription, Denny refused requests to endorse it, instead stating that he did not think that intervention would be compatible with his duties as a soldier. He also considered that the majority of soldiers voted against it, and deplored the split in the Labor Party that conscription had created. In mid-1917 he was attached to the divisional artillery of the 1st Division. On the night of 15 September 1917, he was leading a convoy carrying water to forward areas when it was hit by a heavy artillery barrage, and he was wounded. His recommendation for the Military Cross read:

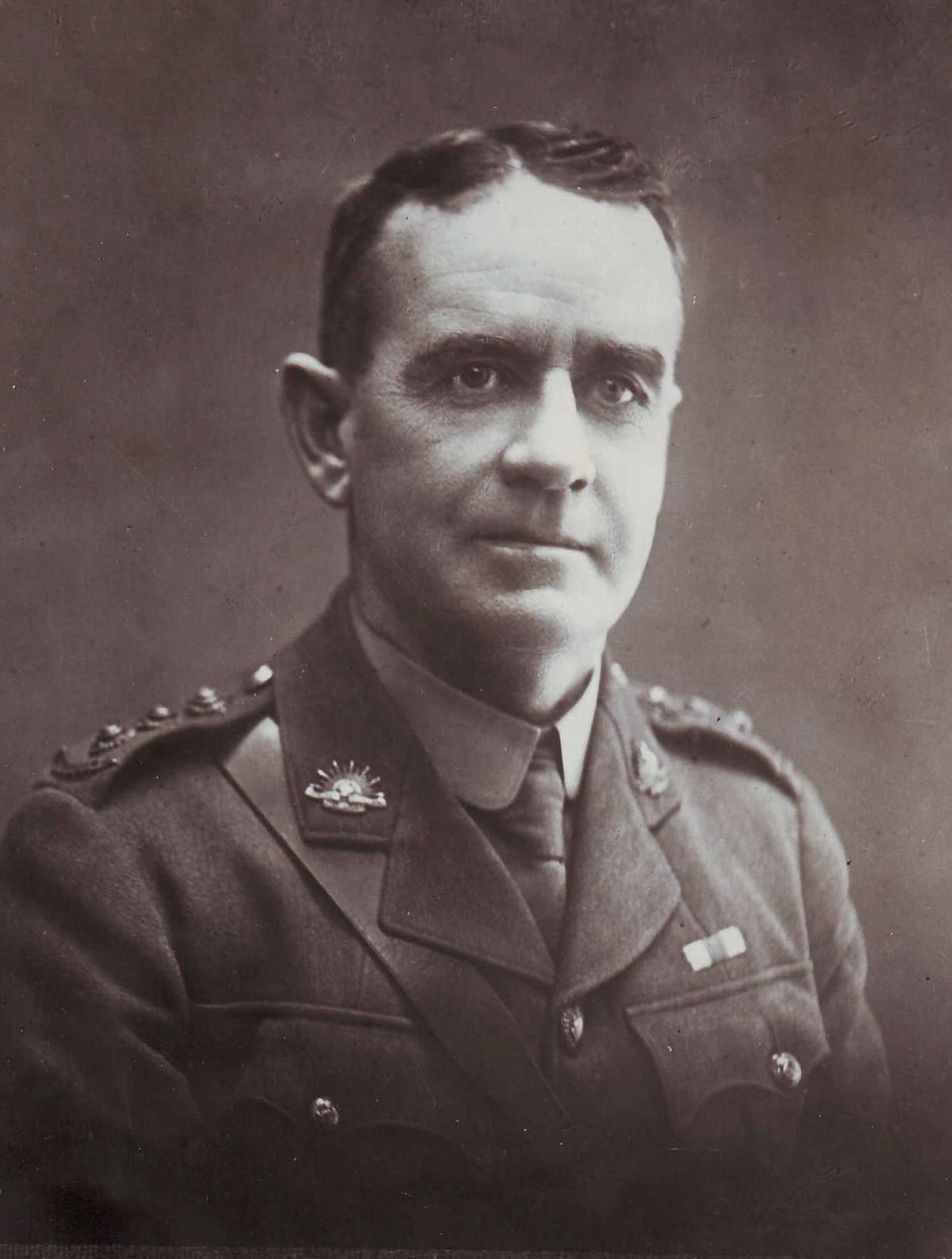
Captain Denny, MC, ante 1921

For conspicuous gallantry and devotion to duty whilst engaged in pack transport work near HOGGE on the night of 15 September 1917. Lieutenant DENNY showed great coolness and initiative throughout, especially when his convoy came under very heavy barrage in the vicinity of CLAPHAM JUNCTION. Although wounded himself, Lieut. DENNY personally obtained assistance for two of his men who were wounded. He then reorganised his command and succeeded in reaching his destination. Lieut. DENNY after delivering this water then went to the dressing station where he dictated a report to D.H.Q. before being evacuated.

He was invested with the Military Cross by King George V at Buckingham Palace in November 1917. After recovering from his wounds, he was attached to the repatriation section of AIF Administrative Headquarters in London from January 1918. He was promoted to captain in September that year. He resigned his commission in the AIF in 1919 and published a memoir titled The Diggers, the foreword of which was written by General Sir William Birdwood, who had commanded the AIF from 1915 until the end of the war.

== Return to Parliament ==
Denny's tall frame and long legs made him a favourite of cartoonists.

Still serving overseas at the time of the 1918 state election, Denny was returned first of three in Adelaide with 30.2 per cent of the ballots cast. He was repatriated to Australia via the United States on 2 August 1919, returning to his seat. While in the United States, he had been regularly published in the New York Herald. He married Winefride Mary Leahy, a pianist and singer, on 15 January 1920 at St. Ignatius Church, Norwood. His brother, the Reverend Richard Denny, officiated at their wedding. He was elected second of two in 1921 and second of three in 1924 with similar proportions of the vote to that he achieved in 1918. He was appointed Attorney-General in the newly elected Labor government of John Gunn in April 1924, and was also Minister for Housing, and initially, Assistant Minister for Repatriation. In January 1925 he was appointed as Minister for Irrigation and Minister for Repatriation, while retaining his Attorney-General and housing portfolios.

During this period he carried out several significant legislative changes. In 1924, as Minister for Housing, Denny was closely associated with the Thousand Homes Scheme, which aimed to provide affordable housing, particularly for returned soldiers and their families, and lower income groups. The land used for this development was the site of the Mitcham military camp at which Denny had trained before embarking for service overseas. Denny's work on the Scheme resulted in a clash with former Premier Sir Henry Barwell, whom he sued for libel after Barwell made statements suggesting that Denny had made false statements to induce merchants to provide goods and services. Barwell later apologised for his comments.

Another change was the transition to the use of judges as the electoral returning officer for South Australia. This was done to impose state control on a system which had effectively combined the administration of the national and state electoral rolls. On 27 May 1925, Denny arranged the appointment of Judge Herbert Kingsley Paine of the Insolvency Court to be appointed as Electoral Officer for the state, replacing Charles Mathews, a state public servant who had held the position since 1907. Denny had previously worked for Paine as a legal associate.

As a returned soldier, Denny was an exception among Labor politicians at both state and federal level in the 1920s. Willing and able to speak about his personal war experiences, he was one of the few Labor politicians invited to unveil memorials. He performed this role for the Soldiers' Memorial Hall at Lameroo in 1926, where his "address was punctuated with applause". When his political enemies persistently queried the circumstances under which he was awarded the Military Cross, he published the citation in response. Despite Labor's loss in the 1927 state election, Denny was returned first of three in the seat of Adelaide, with over 25 per cent of the vote. At the April 1930 state election, he was returned first of three with nearly 82 per cent of the ballots cast. Appointed Attorney-General in the new Labor government of Lionel Hill, Denny was also Minister of Railways, and for the first six months he was also Minister of Local Government. On Anzac Day 1931, acting as Premier in Hill's absence, he officiated at the unveiling of the National War Memorial at the corner of North Terrace and Kintore Avenue, Adelaide, before a crowd of about 75,000. As of 1996, Denny was one of only a few South Australian ministers to have ever had military experience.

In 1931, Denny was expelled from the Labor Party, along with Hill and the rest of the cabinet, for supporting the "Premiers' Plan", which sought to impose austerity measures due to the poor economic conditions. The cabinet formed the Parliamentary Labor Party which continued to govern the state, led by Hill and then by Robert Richards, with the support of the opposition until the 1933 state election. At the 1933 election, Denny lost his seat to a Lang Labor Party candidate.

== Later life ==
In September 1936, Bill's brother, who was a Catholic priest, and his sister, Mary Catherine Denny, were involved in a vehicle accident in which Mary received fatal injuries. His brother suffered from an illness that resulted from the accident which contributed to his death in June 1941. Denny wrote a further autobiographical book, A Digger at Home and Abroad, which was published in 1941. He continued to practice law until his death, despite difficulties associated with rheumatoid arthritis. He died on 2 May 1946 of a heart attack which developed at his home on Osmond Terrace, Norwood, after he returned from his office in Adelaide. He was survived by his wife, one son and three daughters. He was accorded a state funeral, and was buried at West Terrace Cemetery.

He was "keenly interested" in sporting matters, a steward of the Adelaide Racing Club, and was an ex-captain of the Mercantile Rowing Club. Denny was also the patron of the West Adelaide Football Club for twenty years ending in 1930. He enjoyed diving for crayfish under the rocks at the back of Rosetta Head near Victor Harbor on Encounter Bay, and was often accompanied by Ephriam "Brownie" Tripp, an Aboriginal man from the Point McLeay Aboriginal Mission. According to his entry in the Australian Dictionary of Biography, "his preferred reading was Shakespeare and the Bible and he quoted liberally from both. His integrity, versatility and wide knowledge were unquestioned, and he was proud of the democratic legislation he had sponsored."

== Bibliography ==
- Denny, Capt. W. J. (1919). The Diggers. London: Hodder and Stoughton. ISBN 978-0665881596. OCLC 2306667.
- Denny, William Joseph (1941). A Digger at Home and Abroad. Melbourne: Popular Publications. OCLC 3836864.

== Notes ==
Political offices
Preceded by Hermann Homburg	Attorney-General of South Australia; 1910–1912	Succeeded by Hermann Homburg
Preceded by Laurence O'Loughlin	Minister for the Northern Territory; 1910	Ministry abolished
Preceded by Henry Barwell	Attorney-General of South Australia; 1924–1927	Succeeded by Hermann Homburg
New ministerial post	Minister for Housing; 1924–1927	Ministry abolished
Preceded by Hermann Homburg	Attorney-General of South Australia; 1930–1933	Succeeded by Shirley Jeffries
Preceded by George Jenkins	Minister for Railways; 1930–1933	Succeeded by Malcolm McIntosh
South Australian House of Assembly
Preceded by Charles Kingston	Member for West Adelaide; 1900–1902	Seat abolished
New seat	Member for Adelaide; 1902–1905	Succeeded by Ernest Roberts
Preceded by Lewis Cohen	Member for Adelaide; 1906–1933	Succeeded by Doug Bardolph; Bob Dale; Tom Howard
