= Parliamentary Labor Party =

South Australian political party

The Parliamentary Labor Party (also known as the Premiers' Plan Labor Party or Ministerial Labor Party) was a political party active in South Australia from August 1931 until June 1934.

The party came into existence as a result of intense dispute, especially within the Australian Labor Party, about the handling of the response to the Great Depression in Australia. In June 1931, a meeting of state premiers agreed on the Premiers' Plan, which involved sweeping austerity measures combined with increases in revenue. When the Premiers' Plan came up for a vote in South Australia, 23 of Labor's 30 House of Assembly members and two of Labor's four Legislative Council members voted for it. In August 1931, the South Australian state conference of the Labor Party expelled all of the MPs who supported the Premiers' Plan, including Premier Lionel Hill and his entire Cabinet.

Expelled MPs (23) in the House of Assembly:

- Frederick Birrell
- Alfred Blackwell
- Thomas Butterfield
- Clement Collins
- George Cooke
- Jack Critchley
- Bill Denny
- Thomas Edwards
- Even George
- William Harvey
- Lionel Hill
- Leonard Hopkins
- Robert Hunter
- Beasley Kearney
- Arthur McArthur
- Sydney McHugh
- John McInnes
- John Pedler
- Robert Richards
- Eric Shepherd
- Frank Staniford
- Albert Thompson
- Walter Warne

Expelled MPs (2) in the Legislative Council:

- James Jelley
- Stanley Whitford

Upon the failure of a November appeal to the federal executive of the Labor Party, the expelled MPs definitively constituted themselves as a separate parliamentary party.

Having soundly lost its majority, the PLP ministry stayed in office until the 1933 election with the support of the conservative opposition—the Liberal Federation to 1932 and the Liberal and Country League afterward. Hill, facing increasing political challenges, had himself appointed Agent-General in London and abruptly quit politics in February 1932. Robert Richards briefly succeeded him as Premier, and led the party into the 1933 election.

The party, along with the official Labor Party and the rival splinter Lang Labor Party, performed poorly at the 1933 election. Due to massive vote splitting, the LCL won a landslide victory. The three Labor factions won only 13 seats between them, against 29 for the LCL. Of the 23 MPs the party had going into the election, only five – Blackwell, McInnes, Pedler, and Richards in the House of Assembly, and Whitford in the Legislative Council, were reelected.

Two of the three Lang Labor Party MHAs elected at the 1933 state election, Bob Dale and Tom Howard, left the party in 1933 post-election after falling out with leader Doug Bardolph and formed their own party, the South Australian Lang Labor Party (SALLP).

The four Labor parties merged back into the official Labor Party in June 1934 under the leadership of Andrew Lacey of the official Labor faction, following a successful unity conference. Whitford, the party's sole upper house member, had left the party to sit as an independent by the time of the conference, and was not re-admitted.

== See also ==
- Australian Labor Party (South Australian Branch)
- Members of the South Australian House of Assembly, 1930–1933
- Members of the South Australian Legislative Council, 1930–1933
- Richards Ministry
