= John Pedler =

Australian politician (1870–1942)

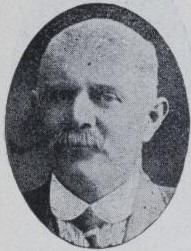

John Nicholas Pedler (25 January 1870 – 10 August 1942) was an Australian politician. He was a member of the South Australian House of Assembly from 1918 to 1938, representing the electorate of Wallaroo.

Pedler was born at Salisbury, and educated at the public school at Paskeville. He was raised on the family farm, "Gum Farm", three miles from Kadina, on which he helped until he was 18. Pedler was a contractor and carter thereafter until 1900, when he inherited the farm and returned to run the property, becoming a successful wheat grower. He became involved in local politics, serving on the Kadina District Council for about thirty years, eventually becoming its chairman, and serving as president of the Kadina branch of the Labor Party. He also served as chairman of the local Agricultural Bureau, President of the Kadina Technical School Council and vice-president of the Kadina Branch of the Australian Workers Union.

Pedler was elected to the House of Assembly for the Labor Party at the 1918 state election, along with future Premier Robert Richards, who Pedler would remain associated with throughout his career. Pedler and Richards defeated two ex-Labor defectors, former Premier John Verran and John Frederick Herbert, who had been expelled from the Labor Party in the 1917 Labor split and had contested the election for the splinter National Party. He was re-elected in 1921, 1924, 1927 and 1930.

In 1931, Pedler was expelled from the Labor Party along with Premier Lionel Hill and his Cabinet, when the party split over the Hill Cabinet's support for the Premiers' Plan. The expelled MPs reconstituted as the splinter Parliamentary Labor Party and contested the 1933 election under that banner, but were resoundingly defeated, Pedler and Richards being among their only MPs to be re-elected. Pedler was readmitted to the Labor Party in 1934 along with the remaining PLP MPs. In 1938, the state abolished multi-member districts for the House of Assembly, and established single-member electorates instead. Pedler lost a Labor preselection vote for the new single-member seat of Wallaroo to Richards, and opted to retire from parliament.

Pedler died suddenly in 1942. He was still a member of the Kadina Council at the time of his death.
