= Thomas Edwards (Australian politician) =

Australian politician

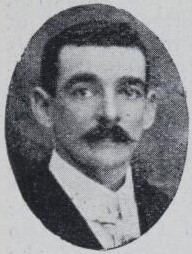

Thomas Tonkin Edwards (5 December 1875 – 27 September 1951) was an Australian politician who represented the South Australian House of Assembly multi-member seat of Barossa from 1930 to 1933. He was elected as a member of the Labor Party, but was expelled from the party in the 1931 Labor split and sat with the splinter Parliamentary Labor Party for the remainder of his term.

He was a hotelkeeper at Tanunda prior to his election to parliament. He was defeated at the 1933 election, and unsuccessfully attempted to regain his seat later that year in a July by-election for his old seat.
