= Thousand Homes Scheme =

The Thousand Homes Scheme was a public housing scheme in Adelaide, South Australia, financed through the State Bank with government support after the First World War.

== History ==
In 1924, to address a housing shortage, the South Australian Government inaugurated the Thousand Homes Scheme to provide affordable housing, particularly for returned soldiers and their families and lower income groups.

Most of the houses were built in Colonel Light Gardens, a planned garden suburb development. South Australian Government town planner W S Griffiths amended part of Charles Reade's original plan of the suburb so that 363 houses could be fitted into the south of the suburb, at the expense of some public areas. A new area west of Goodwood Road was purchased and added to the suburb for a further 332 houses.

== See also ==
- Colonel Light Gardens
- South Australian Housing Trust
- Colonel Light Gardens Historical Society
