= Beasley Kearney =

Australian politician

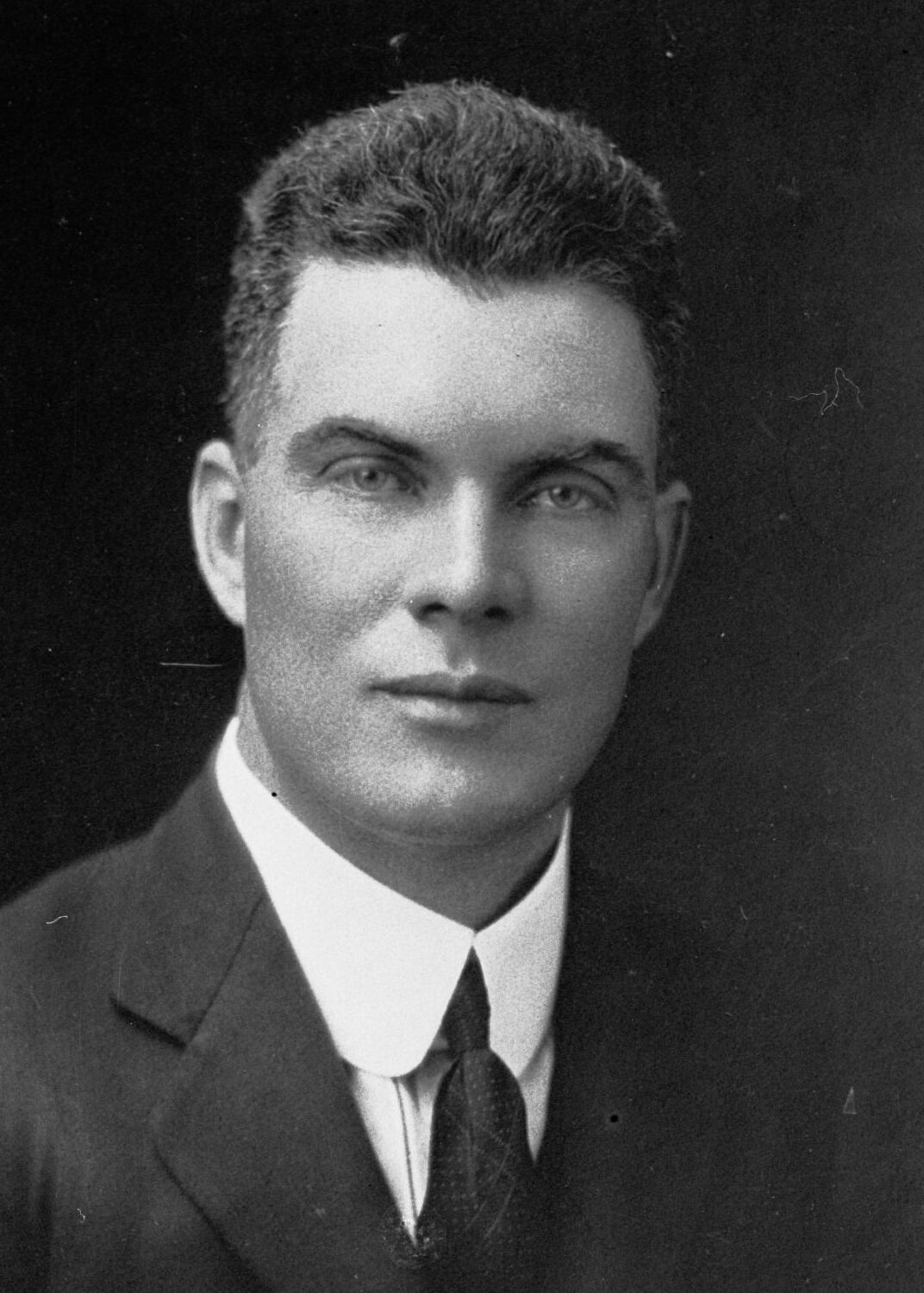
Kearney c. 1935

Beasley James Kearney (2 December 1891 – 11 October 1972) was an Australian politician who represented the South Australian House of Assembly multi-member seat of East Torrens from 1930 to 1933. Elected for the Labor Party, he was expelled in the 1931 Labor split, but was readmitted to the party in 1932.

Kearney was born at Wilmington, South Australia, and was educated at country schools. He became a blacksmith, then joined the South Australian Railways, where he initially worked as a railway porter. He passed the railway clerical examination and went on to work in the railways' clerical branch, before transferring to the State Children's Department, where he was appointed chief prosecuting officer in 1918. He studied law at the University of Adelaide while working with the department, resigning after six years in order to undertake his articles as a solicitor and then being admitted to the bar. He also played Australian rules football for Norwood.

Having become a prominent solicitor in Adelaide, Kearney was elected to the House of Assembly at the 1930 election. Although tipped as a potential Attorney-General, he was not appointed to the ministry. Kearney was one of 23 Labor MPs expelled from the party at its June 1931 conference in the 1931 Labor split. In December, he individually appealed against his expulsion, resulting in a special state conference to decide on his case, which rejected the appeal. However, in June 1932, after a further appeal, the federal executive of the party ordered Kearney and Albert Thompson readmitted to the party. He recontested his seat for official Labor at the April 1933 election, but was defeated.

In July 1933, he was struck off the roll of legal practitioners over allegations that he had fraudulently taken a large sum of money from a client in a deceased estate case. In August 1933, he was convicted and jailed for three years with hard labour after pleading guilty to separate fraud charges involving a total of £1,591.
