= Robert Hunter (Australian politician) =

Australian politician

Robert Hunter (24 August 1877 – 10 June 1960) was an Australian politician who represented the South Australian House of Assembly multi-member seat of Murray from 1930 to 1933. He was elected as a member of the Labor Party, but was expelled from the party in the 1931 Labor split and sat with the splinter Parliamentary Labor Party for the remainder of his term.

Outside of politics, he was the junior partner in Hunter Bros., a fruitgrowing and farming firm operating at Montacute and Meribah.
