= Tom Garland (trade unionist) =

Australian trade unionist (1893–1952)

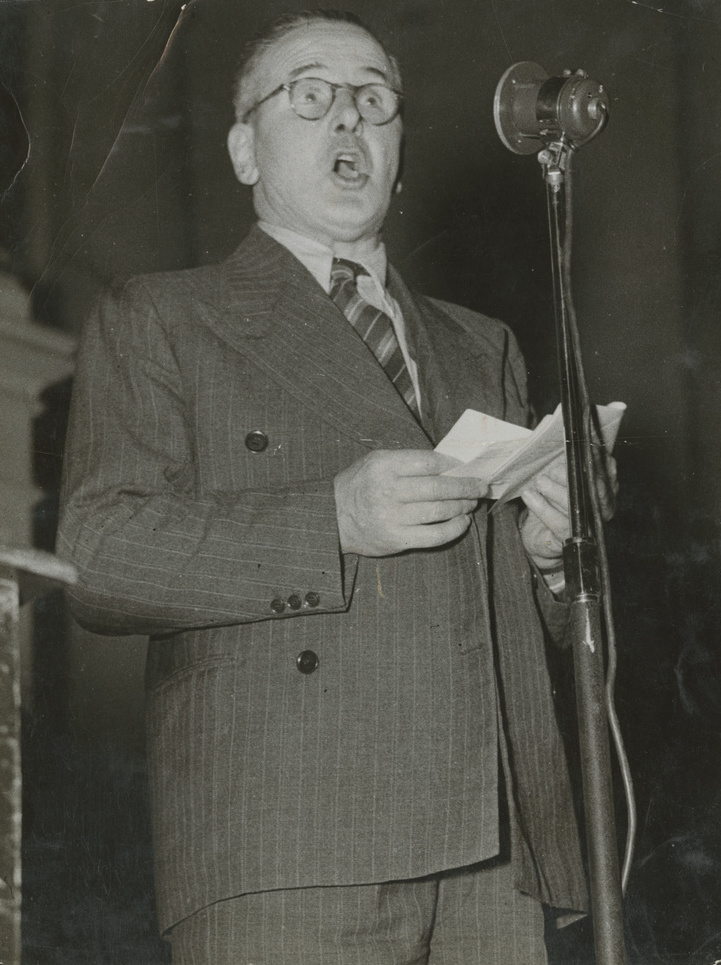
Tom Garland, 1947

Thomas Garland (1 June 1893 – 14 February 1952) was a Scottish-born Australian trade unionist.

Garland was born in Glasgow to ironworker James Garland and Agnes, née Weldon. He attended primary school but was soon working in engineering shops on Clydeside, where he was a recognised leader among the youths. In 1910 he became an apprentice fitter for the engineering and shipbuilding firm A. & J. Inglis, and also joined the Royal Naval Volunteer Reserve. After the outbreak of World War I he became an engine-room artificer and served in HMS Drake until 1915 and HMS Caroline until 1916, being involved in the Battle of Jutland. He trained young artificers at Portsmouth from November 1916 and was invalided out of the navy on 25 September 1919. In 1921 he emigrated to Victoria.

In Australia Garland found work with the State Electricity Company. He married Edith Mary Downey at North Fitzroy on 9 February 1924. He was a member of the Amalgamated Engineering Union (AEU) and was later dismissed for his involvement, moving to Adelaide. In 1929 he was elected president of the AEU's Adelaide district committee and a delegate to the Trades and Labor Council. He joined the Communist Party of Australia, was involved in the 1930 waterside workers' strike, and aided those arrested after the 1931 "beef riot". Sacked by his employer Holden in 1932, he made several unsuccessful bids for public office, running for the South Australian House of Assembly in 1933 and 1941, the Australian House of Representatives in 1934 and the Australian Senate in 1940. In 1933 he became secretary of the Anti-War Council and his continued and strident opposition to "capitalist wars" led to his house being raided in August 1939 after the Molotov–Ribbentrop Pact. He addressed a meeting of the League Against Conscription in 1940, for which he was fined, but by 1942, when Australia was under threat of Japanese invasion, Garland had become a supporter of conscription.

Towards the end of the war Garland turned his attention to the handling of industrial disputes and reconstruction, and in 1945 resigned from the Communist Party over tactical disagreements. He had co-founded Common Cause, a workers' peace movement, in 1942 and it enjoyed early success, but was disbanded in 1949. His secretaryship of the Gasworkers' Union from 1937 to 1946 had been the first time a Communist Party member had served as a union secretary in South Australia. He was also president of the South Australian Trades and Labor Council from 1936 to 1937 and from 1943 to 1945 and became its secretary in 1946, holding the position until 1949. His past made it difficult for him to find work; he subsequently became secretary-clerk at the McKechnie Iron Foundry. A long-time sufferer from heart disease, he died of coronary thrombosis at Kilkenny in 1952.
