= Robert Richards (Australian politician) =

Australian politician (1885–1967)

The Honourable Robert Richards
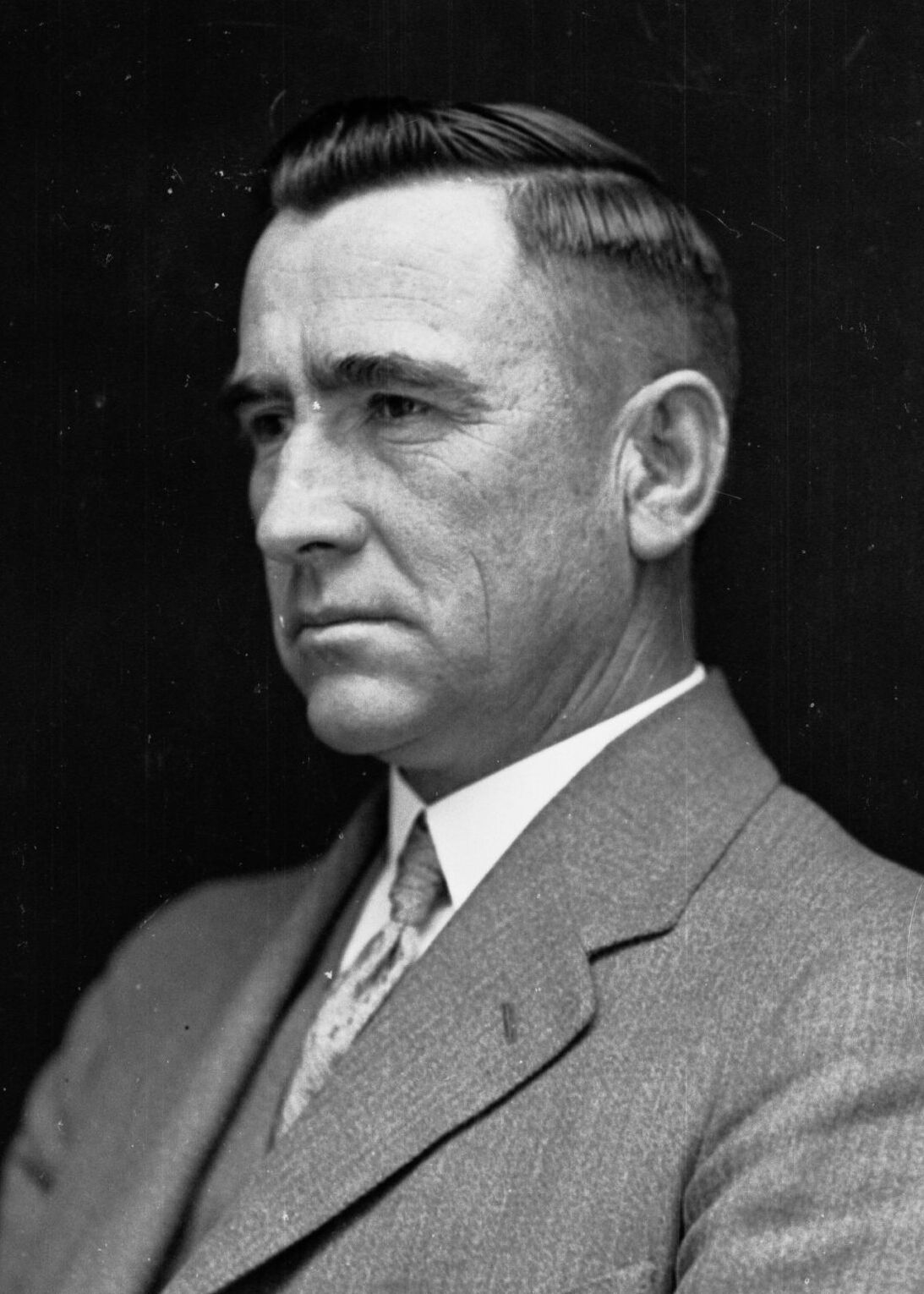
- Richards in 1931

32nd Premier of South Australia
- In office 13 February 1933 – 18 April 1933
- Monarch: George V
- Governor: Earl of Gowrie
- Preceded by: Lionel Hill
- Succeeded by: Richard L. Butler

Leader of the Opposition in South Australia Leader of the South Australian Labor Party
- In office 1 April 1938 – 27 October 1949
- Deputy: Andrew Lacey; Mick O'Halloran
- Preceded by: Andrew Lacey
- Succeeded by: Mick O'Halloran

Deputy Leader of the South Australian Labor Party
- In office 22 June 1934 – 1 April 1938
- Preceded by: J.C. Fitzgerald
- Succeeded by: Andrew Lacey

Leader of the Parliamentary Labor Party
- In office 13 February 1933 – 22 June 1934
- Preceded by: Lionel Hill
- Succeeded by: party merged

Member of the South Australian Parliament for Wallaroo
- In office 6 April 1918 – 22 November 1949
- Preceded by: John Frederick Herbert
- Succeeded by: Hughie McAlees

Minister of Irrigation and Repatriation
- In office 13 February 1933 – 18 April 1933
- Preceded by: Stanley Whitford
- Succeeded by: Malcolm McIntosh
Other Cabinet Posts
Minister of Labour & Employment
In office 12 November 1931 – 13 February 1933
Preceded by	office established
Succeeded by	Frank Staniford
Minister of Mines Minister of Marine
In office 30 October 1930 – 18 April 1933
Preceded by	Stanley Whitford
Succeeded by	Herbert Hudd
Commissioner of Crown Lands
In office 17 April 1930 – 18 April 1933
Preceded by	George Jenkins
Succeeded by	Malcolm McIntosh

Personal details
- Born: Robert Stanley Richards; 31 May 1885 Moonta, South Australia, Australia
- Died: 24 April 1967 (aged 81) Moonta, South Australia, Australia
- Party: Australian Labor Party (SA)

Robert Stanley Richards (31 May 1885 – 24 April 1967) was an Australian politician. He served as premier of South Australia for two months in 1933, leading the Parliamentary Labor faction of the Australian Labor Party (ALP) in the aftermath of a major party split. His government was defeated in a landslide at the 1933 state election. He returned as leader of the reunited ALP from 1938 to 1949, leading the party to three consecutive electoral defeats as leader of the opposition in the face of severe electoral malapportionment. He later served as administrator of Nauru, a UN trust territory administered by Australia, from 1949 to 1951.

== Early life ==
Born in Moonta Mines, South Australia, the youngest of twelve children to Cornish miner Richard Richards and his wife Mary, Richards was locally educated before leaving school at age 13 to work in the Moonta mines, initially in menial jobs and later as a carpenter. In his early twenties Richards moved to Burnie, Tasmania to manage a copper mine before returning to Moonta, where he married Ada Dixon on 31 January 1914.

== Politics ==
Richards became involved with the labour movement and was elected vice-president of the Federated Mining Employees Association in 1916. When that union merged into the Australian Workers' Union in 1917, he became president of the AWU's mining section, proving himself to be a forceful and competent leader. A lay Methodist preacher, Freemason and keen cricketer and Australian rules footballer, Richards was a popular and well known local identity and it came as no surprise when he sought Labor preselection.

Elected to the Electoral district of Wallaroo (which covered Moonta) in the South Australian House of Assembly at the 1918 election, Richards quickly gained a reputation in parliament for his leadership and debating abilities and following Labor's victory at the 1924 election, Richards was named Chairman of Committees, firstly in the John Gunn led government and, following Gunn's resignation, in Lionel Hill's cabinet.

Ousted from government at the 1927 election by the Richard Layton Butler led Liberal Federation, South Australia first enjoyed the boom of the 1920s and then suffered the onset of the Great Depression in Australia. The 1930 election was highlighted by Butler's warning to voters that the Depression would worsen before it improved and Labor leader Hill's promise of a master plan to solve the problems of the Depression. Labor was swept to power and Richards appointed to the positions of Commissioner of Crown Lands, Minister of Mines and Marine and Minister of Labour and Employment.

Unfortunately, Labor did not have a master strategy to combat the Depression, and was instead forced to institute wage cuts and sweeping retrenchments in the public service as part of implementing the frugal measures of the 1931 Premiers' Plan enacted to fight the Depression. The Premier's Plan saw widespread discontent in South Australia, particularly within traditional working-class Labor supporters, resulting in the ALP state executive expelling 23 of the 30 members of the parliamentary caucus—including Richards and the entire cabinet—from the Labor Party later in 1931. The 23 expelled MPs formed the Parliamentary Labor Party (also known as Premiers Plan Labor), which stayed in office with the support of the conservative opposition.

The Hill Cabinet remained precariously in power until February 1933, when Hill happily resigned as Premier nine weeks before the 1933 election to move to London as Australian Agent-General. Richards reluctantly succeeded Hill as Premier and Treasurer of South Australia. Without public or party support, Richards found himself leading his ministry into an election that, by most accounts, he had virtually no chance of winning.

Richards spent his nine weeks as Premier attempting to talk up the achievements of his cabinet. However, it was nowhere near enough to save him from defeat at the state election. With three Labor factions—Richards' Parliamentary Labor Party, the official ALP and the Lang Labor Party—splitting the vote, the revitalised opposition in the guise of the Butler-led Liberal and Country League (a merging of Butler's Liberal Federation and the Country Party) won a landslide majority. The three Labor factions won only 13 seats between them

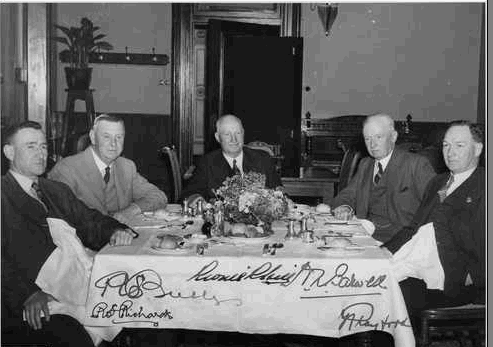
Former South Australian premiers (from left) Richards, Sir Richard Butler, Lionel Hill and Sir Henry Barwell meet with then Premier Tom Playford in 1940

Richards spent the next year working to reunite the ALP and following his success, served as Deputy Leader of the reunited party from 1934 to 1938 under the leadership of Andrew Lacey (prior to this he was the leader of the Parliamentary Labor Party, separated from the executive, although Richards made efforts with Lacey and the other factions to merge the parties into a united front from the turmoil his predecessor had put them in). Following another heavy defeat at the 1938 state election, where more independents were elected to parliament than Labor members, Richards became Labor leader for a second time.

Richards remained opposition leader for 11 years, during which Labor increased its primary vote at three consecutive elections. However, it was unable to dislodge the LCL, now led by Tom Playford, due to the electoral malapportionment known as the Playmander, in which rural votes were worth several times more than votes in Adelaide. He actually led Labor to a 53.3 percent two-party vote at the 1944 election. In most of the rest of Australia, this would have been enough to make him Premier with a solid majority. However, due to the Playmander, Labor was only able to net a five-seat swing in this election, leaving it with 16 seats, four short of victory. By 1949, Richards had suffered the death of his wife and, with the realisation that the current system gave Labor little chance of returning to government, retired from politics to serve as the Commonwealth Government's Administrator of Nauru, taking his new bride with him.

He returned from Nauru to Adelaide in 1951; served as director of radio station 5KA, then under Methodist control; and was appointed to the South Australian government Forestry Board in 1954. Playford, never afraid to make use of opponents' skills for the greater good, also commissioned Richards to investigate issues relating to delinquent children, mining issues and housing.

== Death ==
Afflicted by diabetes, Richards nonetheless lived long enough to see a Labor government returned to South Australia (under the leadership of Premier Frank Walsh) in 1965. He died in Moonta two years later, and received a state funeral.

== Family ==
Richards married Ada Maude Dixon (ca.1883 – 20 July 1948), whose sisters married S. R. Whitford and Oswald Pryor, on 31 January 1914. Their children included two daughters: Joyce and Kathlean.

== Notes ==
Political offices
Preceded by Lionel Hill	Premier of South Australia; 1933	Succeeded by Richard Layton Butler
Preceded by Lionel Hill	Treasurer of South Australia; 1933	Succeeded by Richard Layton Butler
Preceded by Andrew Lacey	Leader of the Opposition of South Australia; 1938–1949	Succeeded by Mick O'Halloran
Parliament of South Australia
Preceded by John Herbert	Member for Wallaroo; 1918–1950; Served alongside: John Pedler	Succeeded by Hughie McAlees
Party political offices
Preceded by Andrew Lacey	Leader of the Australian Labor Party (South Australian Branch); 1938–1949	Succeeded by Mick O'Halloran
