= Alfred Blackwell =

Australian politician (1876–1955)

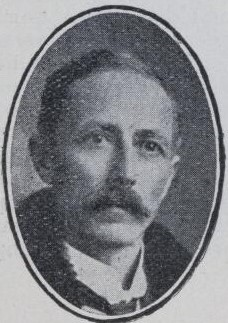

Alfred Joseph Blackwell (9 April 1876 – 16 October 1955) was an Australian politician who represented the South Australian House of Assembly multi-member seat of West Torrens from 1918 to 1938 for the Labor Party, excluding the 1931–34 Labor split, when he sat with the splinter Parliamentary Labor Party.

Blackwell was a butcher by trade. He became the assistant secretary and organiser of the state branch of the Australasian Meat Industry Employees Union in 1910, and its state general secretary in 1916. He also served as vice-president of the union's federal council, and as its delegate to the United Trades and Labour Council of South Australia. He served as a councillor and an alderman of the Town of Thebarton, and was mayor of Thebarton in 1918 and 1919. He later served as state president of the Australian Railways Union for over a decade until 1931.

He was elected to the House of Assembly at the 1918 election. He was a member of the Parliamentary Standing Committee on Railways from 1926 to 1927, and of the Parliamentary Standing Committee on Public Works from 1927 to 1938.

He suffered a family tragedy in 1928 when two of his children were killed when their cart was hit by a train.
