= Arthur McArthur (politician) =

Australian politician

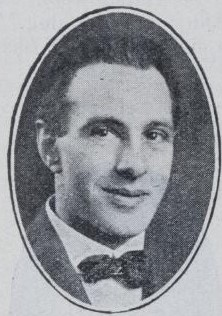

Arthur McArthur (19 May 1884 - 13 November 1959) was an Australian politician. He was the Labor member for East Torrens in the South Australian House of Assembly from 1930 to 1933.
