= Lionel Hill =

Australian politician (1881–1963)

The Honourable Lionel Hill
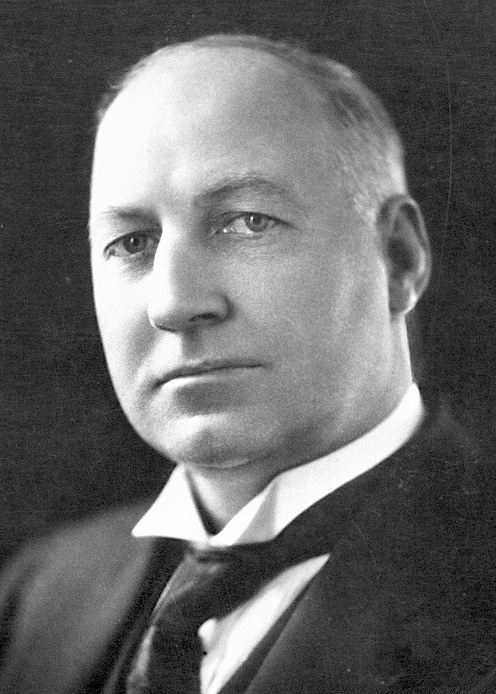

15th Agent-General for South Australia
- In office 22 April 1933 – 21 September 1934
- Preceded by: Henry Barwell
- Succeeded by: Charles McCann

30th Premier of South Australia
- In office 28 August 1926 – 8 April 1927
- Monarch: George V
- Governor: Earl of Gowrie
- Preceded by: John Gunn
- Succeeded by: Richard L. Butler
- In office 17 April 1930 – 13 February 1933
- Monarch: George V
- Governor: Sir Tom Bridges
- Preceded by: Richard L. Butler
- Succeeded by: Robert Richards

Leader of the Opposition in South Australia
- In office 8 April 1927 – 17 April 1930
- Preceded by: Richard L. Butler
- Succeeded by: Richard L. Butler

Leader of the Parliamentary Labor Party of South Australia
- In office 14 August 1931 – 13 February 1933
- Preceded by: party splintered
- Succeeded by: Robert Richards

Leader of the South Australian Labor Party
- In office 18 August 1926 – 15 August 1931 (expelled)
- Preceded by: John Gunn
- Succeeded by: Edgar Dawes

Alderman on the Kensington and Norwood Council
- In office 5 July 1958 – 19 March 1963
- Preceded by: Cecil Thomas
- Succeeded by: Reginald Nurse
- Constituency: East Norwood

Personal details
- Born: Lionel Laughton Hill; 14 May 1881 Adelaide, South Australia
- Died: 19 March 1963 (aged 81) Norwood, South Australia
- Party: Australian Labor Party (SA)

Lionel Laughton Hill (14 May 1881 – 19 March 1963) was an Australian politician who served as the thirtieth Premier of South Australia, representing the South Australian Branch of the Australian Labor Party.

== Early life ==
Born in Adelaide, South Australia but raised on a farm near Maitland, Hill left school aged 12 to work on the South Australian government railways, where he first became involved in the labour movement. This led to his appointment as the secretary-treasurer of the Boilermakers' Assistants' Union in 1901, a position he held until 1914. Hill was also able to combine his work with a distinguished Australian rules footballing career in the South Australian National Football League. He made his league debut for West Adelaide Football Club as a seventeen year old and played 52 games until the end of 1902 before joining North Adelaide Football Club in 1903 and then starring for Norwood Football Club from 1904 until 1913. Hill won the Best and fairest in his only year at North Adelaide and won three best and fairests while at Norwood in 1904, 1908 and 1909. He also represented the State in interstate matches on numerous occasions.

== Parliament ==
After marrying in 1908, Hill further increased his stature in the labour movement in 1910 by becoming secretary of the South Australian branch of the Australian Tramway Employees' Association and its federal president in 1912. Hill then gained Australian Labor Party pre-selection for the South Australian House of Assembly electorate of East Torrens, which he duly won at the 1915 election.

In parliament Hill was considered "a slow thinker and unimpressive orator" but gained statewide recognition for his role as President of the Anti-Conscription Council, an issue so divisive during World War I that it caused the 1916 Labor split. In the wake of the split, Hill resigned his East Torrens seat in 1917 to unsuccessfully contest the Australian Senate elections as an anti-conscriptionist Labor candidate.

Remaining in the political spotlight by becoming President of the South Australian branch of the Labor Party, Hill returned to South Australian politics at the 1918 election as the member for the rural electorate of Port Pirie. His time in parliament was undistinguished but when the John Gunn led ALP won government following the 1924 election Hill was appointed Minister of Education and industry and Commissioner of Public Works. And upon Gunn's resignation in August 1926, Hill became Premier and Treasurer of South Australia for eight months until the 1927 election when the Richard Layton Butler led Liberal Federation returned to power and Hill became opposition leader.

The onset of the Great Depression in Australia, in combination with a serious drought gripping the state, cast shadows over the 1930 election as the Liberal Federation struggled to combat the resulting severe economic downturn. During the election campaign Butler cautioned voters to expect hardships ahead, while Hill promised a golden future under the slogan "Work for the Workless; Land for the Landless and Equitable Taxation for All" and was elected in a landslide, winning 30 of the 46 seats in the House of Assembly, the largest percentage of seats won by South Australian Labor in any election.

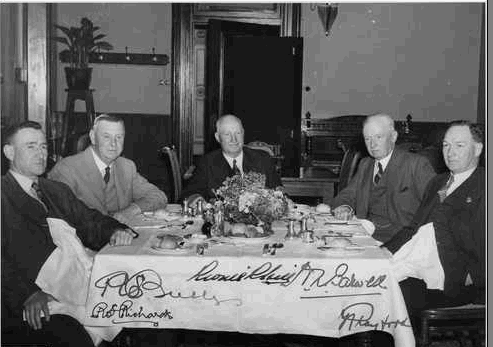
Former South Australian premiers (from left) Robert Richards, Sir Richard Butler, Lionel Hill and Sir Henry Barwell meet with then Premier Tom Playford in 1940

Hill returned as Premier and treasurer but faced problems like high unemployment, a formidable state debt, a shrinking economy and a strike prone workforce. His cabinet found themselves in the unenviable position of being quite incapable of finding a solution to these problems and led to Hill accepting the contentious Premiers' Plan of 1931 which advocated reductions in spending (including aid to the unemployed), public works and wages. Such was the public outcry against the Plan, particularly from traditional Labor supporters, that the executive of the South Australian ALP expelled all of the MPs who supported it from the party, including Hill and his entire cabinet. After an unsuccessful appeal to the federal ALP, Hill and his followers organised as the splinter Parliamentary Labor Party, with Hill as leader. He was only able to remain Premier with the support of the Liberal Federation.

The Hill government continued to stagger from crisis to crisis as riots and protests rocked the state and unemployment reached 35%. In the lead up to the 1933 election Hill continued to quarrel with his cabinet colleagues, leading to his resignation from parliament and the Premiership on 13 February 1933 to controversially assume the position of South Australian Agent-General in London, leaving his successor Robert Richards with the unenviable task of leading the state until the election. At that election, the Liberal and Country League—formed a year earlier from the merger of the Liberal Federation and the Country Party—won a sweeping victory. The three competing Labor factions—the PLP, the official ALP and the Lang Labor Party—were reduced to only 13 seats between them.

Controversy and Hill remained on close terms as complaints about his performance as Agent-General led to Hill's resignation from that position in August 1934 and his return to South Australia, where he joined the LCL and sought preselection. This failed to materialise but Hill was appointed in 1936 by the federal government to chair the ACT Industrial Board.

Hill returned to South Australia in 1958 and found the lure of politics too great, successfully standing for the Town of Kensington and Norwood council.

== Death ==
Any plans of further electoral success were stymied only by his death in 1963. Thirty years after his departure from the ALP, he was still disliked by many Laborites with long memories. Ross McMullin, in his history of the Labor Party, The Light on the Hill, describes him as one of the worst Labor leaders federally or in any state.

== See also ==
- First Hill ministry
- Second Hill ministry

Political offices
Preceded by George Jenkins	Commissioner of Public Works; 1924 – 1926	Succeeded by John McInnes
Preceded by John Gunn	Premier of South Australia; 1926–1927	Succeeded by Richard Layton Butler
Preceded by John Gunn	Treasurer of South Australia; 1926–1927	Succeeded by Richard Layton Butler
Preceded by Richard Layton Butler	Leader of the Opposition of South Australia; 1927–1930	Succeeded by Richard Layton Butler
Preceded by Richard Layton Butler	Premier of South Australia; 1930–1933	Succeeded by Robert Richards
Preceded by Richard Layton Butler	Treasurer of South Australia; 1930–1933	Succeeded by Robert Richards
Parliament of South Australia
New district	Member for East Torrens; 1915–1917; Served alongside: John Southwood, Frederick Coneybeer	Succeeded by Walter Hamilton
Preceded by William Cole	Member for Port Pirie; 1918–1933; Served alongside: John Fitzgerald	Succeeded by Andrew Lacey
Party political offices
Preceded by John Gunn	Leader of the Australian Labor Party (South Australian Branch); 1926–1931	Succeeded by Edgar Dawes
Diplomatic posts
Preceded by Henry Barwell	Agent-General for South Australia; 1933–1934	Succeeded by Charles McCann
