= Martin Collaton =

Australian politician

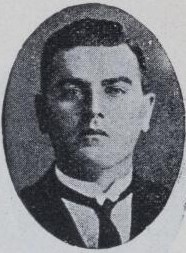

Martin Louis Collaton (11 August 1887 – 25 November 1963) was an Australian politician who represented the South Australian House of Assembly multi-member seat of Adelaide from 1931 to 1933. Elected for the Lang Labor Party, he defected to the Labor Party while in office.

He worked in the iron trade, in wool, wheat and timber yards and in the Broken Hill mines before becoming state secretary of the Federated Ironworkers' Association. He won a 1931 by-election for the new Lang Labor Party.
