= Walter Warne =

Australian politician

Walter John William Warne (17 July 1898 – 23 June 1962) was an Australian politician who represented the South Australian House of Assembly multi-member seat of North Adelaide from 1930 to 1933 for the Labor Party.
