= 1933 South Australian state election =

- 8 April 1933

All 46 seats in the South Australian House of Assembly 24 seats needed for a majority
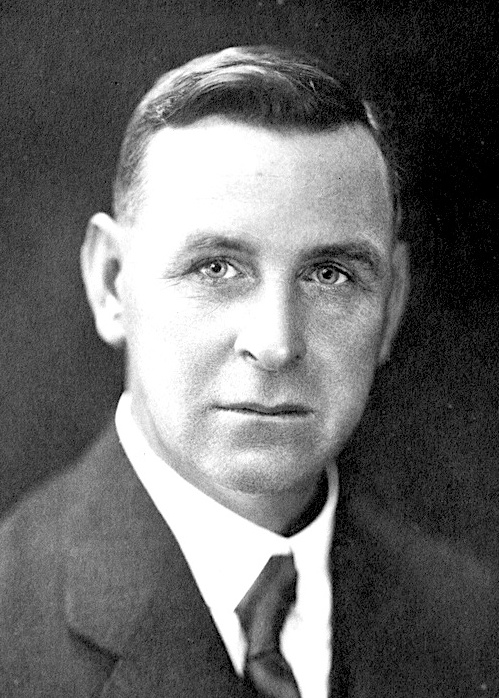

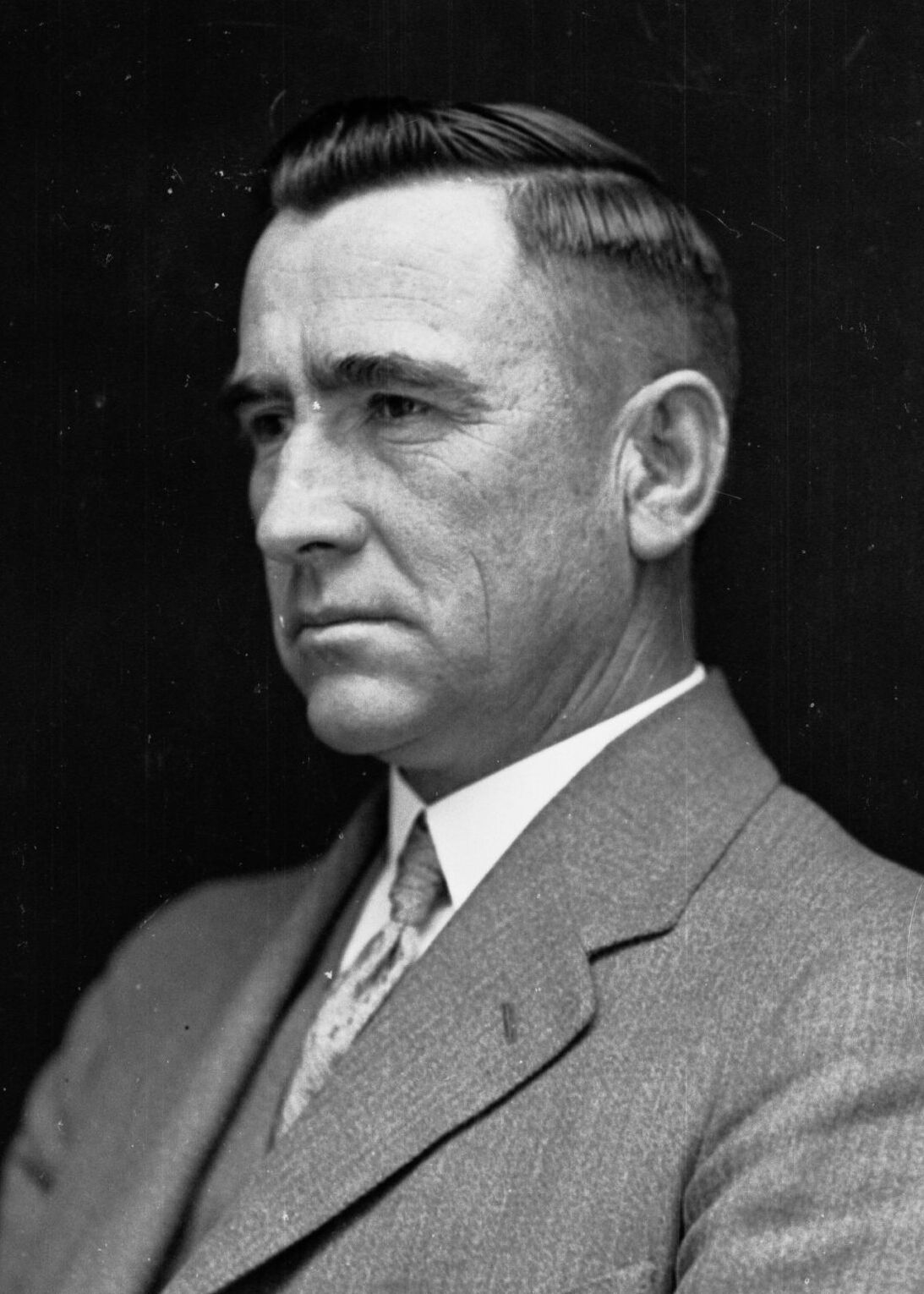

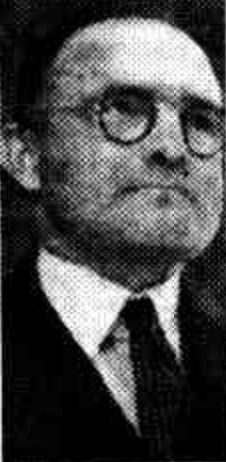
	First party	Second party
Leader	Richard L. Butler	Edgar Dawes
Party	Liberal and Country	Labor
Leader since	7 December 1925	12 May 1932
Leader's seat	Wooroora	Sturt
Last election	Did not exist	30 seats
Seats won	29	6
Seat change	▲23	▼24
Percentage	34.62%	27.78%
Swing		▼20.86
	Third party	Fourth party
Leader	Robert Richards	Doug Bardolph
Party	Parliamentary Labor	Lang Labor
Leader since	1933	August 1931
Leader's seat	Wallaroo	Adelaide
Last election	Did not exist	Did not exist
Seats won	4	3
Seat change	▲4	▲3
Percentage	16.30%	3.68%
Swing	▲16.30	▲3.68
Premier before election
Robert Richards
Parliamentary Labor
Premier after election
Richard L. Butler
Liberal and Country

The 1933 South Australian state election was held on 8 April 1933 to elect all 46 members of the South Australian House of Assembly. The incumbent Parliamentary Labor Party government, led by Premier Robert Richards, was defeated by the opposition Liberal and Country League, led by Leader of the Opposition Richard L. Butler. Each district elected multiple members.

== Background ==
After the ALP government of Premier Lionel Hill endorsed the controversial Premiers' Plan following the start of the Great Depression in Australia and the subsequent Australian Labor Party split of 1931, the ALP state executive expelled 23 of the 30 members of the ALP caucus, including the entire cabinet. The expelled MPs formed the Parliamentary Labor Party (also known as Premiers Plan Labor), with Hill as leader and Premier, and continued in office with the support of the Butler-led Liberal Federation.

Amid increasing riots and protests, as well as skyrocketing unemployment, Hill left politics to become Australian Agent-General to the United Kingdom. He was succeeded by Robert Richards, who had the impossible task of leading the government into the election.

In contrast to the ructions in Labor, the conservative forces in the state presented a united front at the 1931 federal election, when all anti-Labor major party candidates in the state ran under the banner of the Emergency Committee of South Australia. This grouping took an additional two seats to hold six of the state's seven seats in the federal House of Representatives and all three available seats in the bloc-voting winner-take-all Senate. In 1932, buoyed by this success, the Liberal Federation and the Country Party merged as the Liberal and Country League under Butler's leadership.

With three Labor factions—the official ALP, Premiers Plan Labor and Lang Labor—splitting the combined 47.8% total Labor vote, the result was a landslide victory for the LCL. The LCL won 29 seats versus only 13 for the three Labor factions combined. Though the Labor split in South Australia would only last until 1934, this would be the start of 32 years of LCL government in South Australia—one of the longest unbroken runs for a governing party in the Commonwealth. The LCL would stay in office until the 1965 state election with the assistance of a pro-LCL electoral malapportionment known as the Playmander, which would be introduced in 1936.

== Results ==
Arrangement of the House of Assembly after the 1933 state election.

South Australian state election, 8 April 1933 House of Assembly << 1930–1938 >>
Enrolled voters	338,576				
Votes cast	182,693		Turnout	59.45%	–11.91%
Informal votes	8,904		Informal	4.87%	-0.84%
Summary of votes by party
Party	Primary votes	%	Swing	Seats	Change
Liberal and Country	60,159	34.62%	*	29	*
Labor	48,273	27.78%	–20.86%	6	– 24
Parliamentary Labor	28,319	16.30%	*	4	*
Lang Labor	6,398	3.68%	*	3	*
Single Tax League	5,429	3.12%	+1.80%	1	± 0
Communist	1,908	1.10%	+0.77%	0	± 0
Independent	23,303	13.41%	+11.09%	3	+ 3
Total	173,789			46	

== See also ==
- Results of the South Australian state election, 1933 (House of Assembly)
- Candidates of the South Australian state election, 1933
- Members of the South Australian House of Assembly, 1933-1938
- Members of the South Australian Legislative Council, 1933–1938
