= Premiers' Plan =

1931 deflationary economic policy plan

The Premiers' Plan was a deflationary economic policy agreed by a meeting of the Premiers of the Australian states in June 1931 to combat the Great Depression in Australia that sparked the 1931 Labor split.

== Background ==
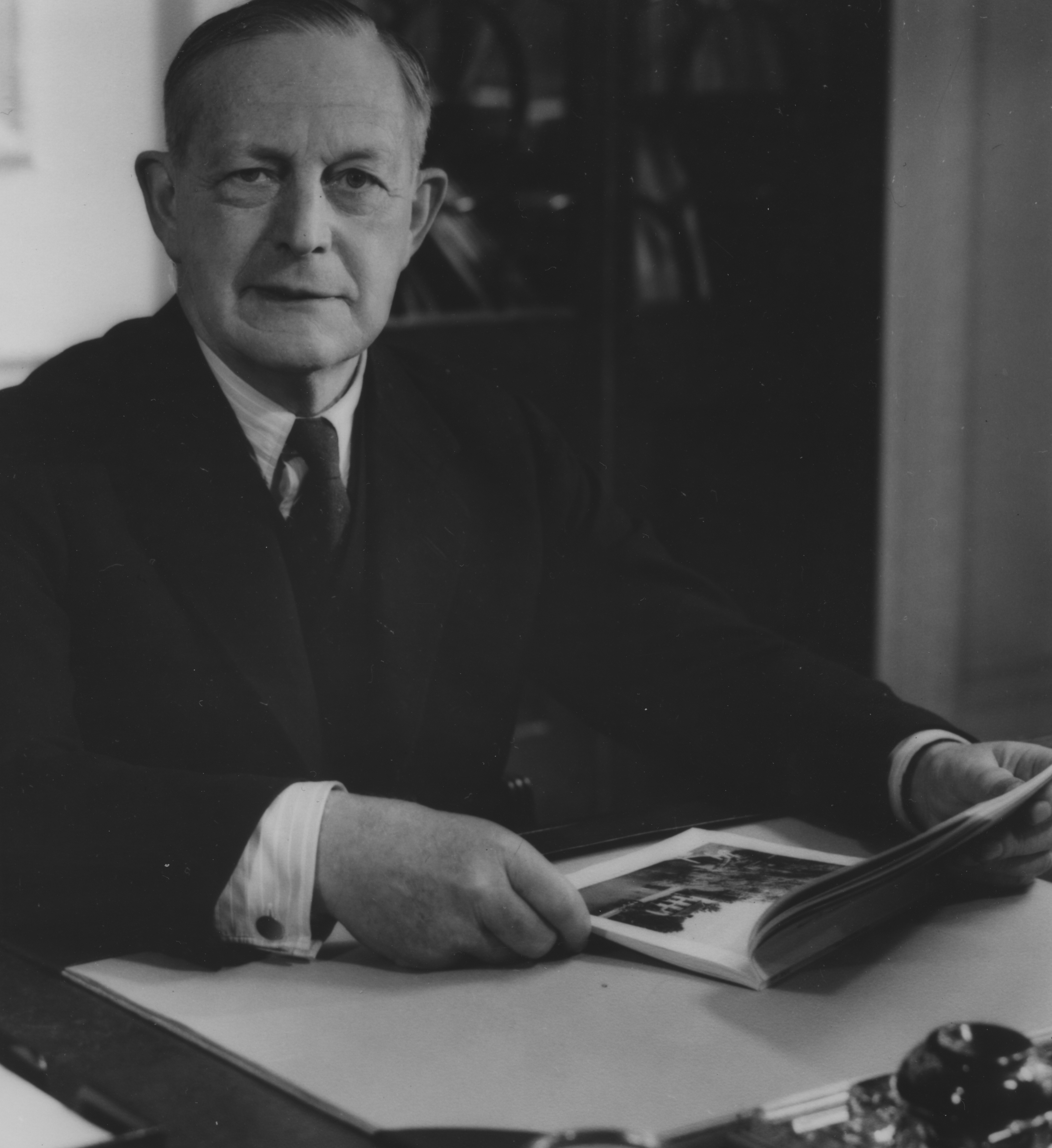
Sir Otto Niemeyer of the Bank of England advised Australian governments to pursue a deflationary economic policy and honour their debt repayments.

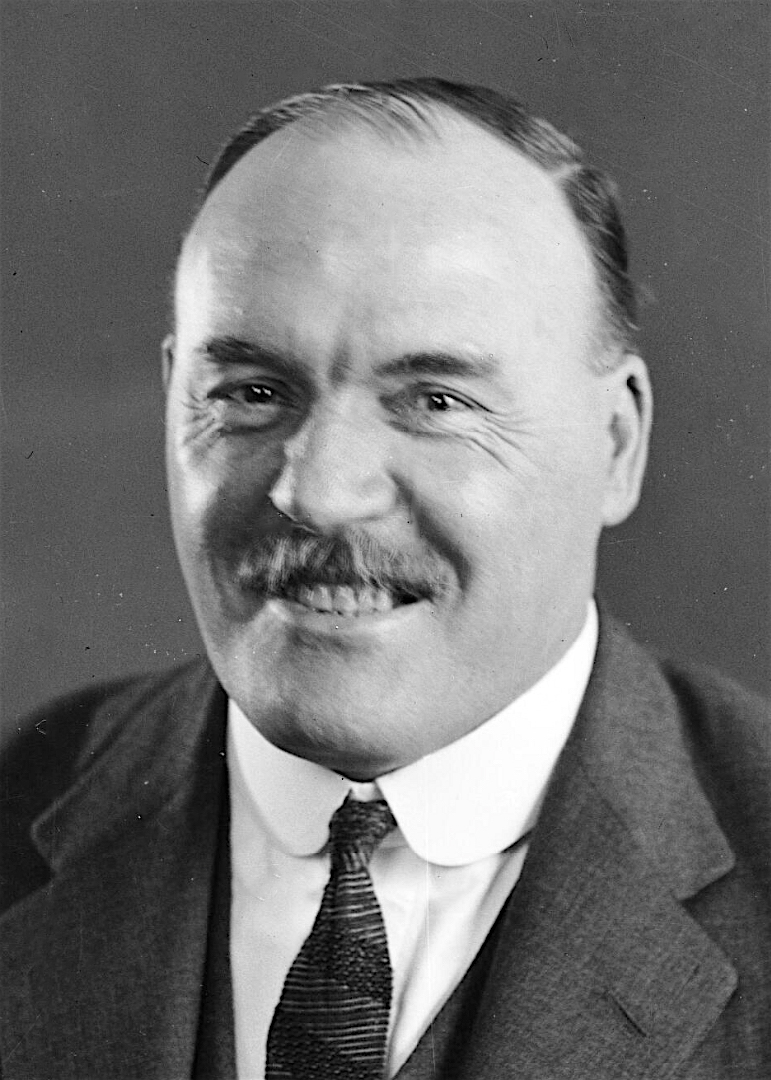
New South Wales Premier Jack Lang rejected the deflationary philosophy of the Premiers Plan and proposed to cease payments on interest on debts to Britain.

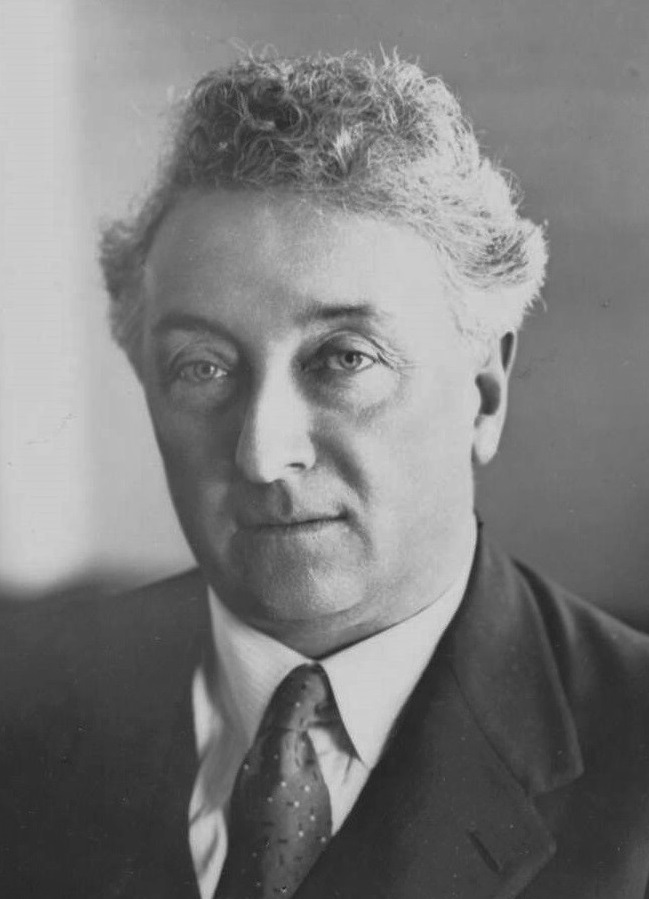
Joseph Lyons, United Australia Party Prime Minister from 1932-1939. The Lyons government supported the Premiers Plan and blocked Lang's efforts to avoid debt repayments.

The Great Depression in Australia saw huge levels of unemployment and economic suffering amid plummeting export income. Although the economic downturn was a product of international events, Australian governments grappled with how to respond. Conventional economists said governments should pursue deflationary policies. Radicals proposed inflationary responses and increased government spending. The James Scullin Labor Government had won office at the 1929 federal election just in time to face the full force of the global crisis—the ‘Wall Street crash’ took place in the first week of his government. Division emerged within the Labor government over how to respond.

Scullin invited Sir Otto Niemeyer of the Bank of England to come to Australia to advise on economic policy. Niemeyer recommended a traditional deflationary response of balanced budgets to combat Australia's high levels of debt and insisted that interest on loans be met. Labor Treasurer Ted Theodore meanwhile supported the view of John Maynard Keynes that an inflationary policy of increased government spending was required. The Senate and Commonwealth Bank rejected his spending plans. The Labor Premier of New South Wales, Jack Lang, meanwhile announced the Lang Plan in February 1931, which entailed a temporary cessation of interest repayments on debts to Britain and that interest on all government borrowings be reduced to 3% to free up money for injection into the economy.

With the rejection of the Theodore and Lang inflationary plans, the governments of Australia met to negotiate a compromise in 1931.

== Plan ==
The plan required the Australian federal and state governments to cut spending by 20%, including cuts to wages and pensions and was to be accompanied by tax increases, reductions in interest on bank deposits and a 22.5% reduction in the interest the government paid on internal loans.

The policy contrasted with the approach put forward by the British economist John Maynard Keynes and which was pursued by the United States, which held that governments needed to spend their way out of the Depression. The plan was signed by New South Wales Labor Premier Jack Lang, but he was a notable critic of its underlying philosophy and went on to pursue his own policy of defaulting on debt repayments, which led to confrontation with the federal Scullin and Lyons governments, and ultimately resulted in Lang's dismissal from office in 1932.

== Aftermath ==
Australia's recovery from the Great Depression began from 1932, aided by a slow recovery in international wool and wheat prices. The influence of government policy on Australia's recovery is a matter contested by historians.

The Labor Party split in 1931 over how to respond to the Depression, with the radical left led by Jack Lang and the fiscal conservatives led by Joseph Lyons. Lyons supported the Premiers' Plan, opposed Lang and distrusted Theodore's approach. Theodore was removed from cabinet due to an investigation for financial misconduct while Premier of Queensland, but was returned to cabinet after being cleared of wrongdoing. Lyons and the other main proponent of the Premiers' Plan in cabinet, James Fenton, resigned in protest. Two months later, Lyons, Fenton and other disaffected Labor members joined with the opposition Nationalist Party of Australia to form the United Australia Party. The newly merged party went on to sweep the 1931 federal election and govern Australia for a decade. Federal supporters of Jack Lang meanwhile became known as Lang Labor.

The Hogan government in Victoria fell in 1932 after a dispute with the Victorian Executive of the Labor Party about how to restore public service salaries that had been cut under the Plan, with the cabinet unanimously opposed to restoring salaries above 500 pounds, the Victorian Executive insisting on this under pressure from the Public Service Association. After the cabinet's unanimous resolution was broken by Ministers Tuncliffe and John Cain (senior) in negotiation with the Executive, other Ministers starting with E.L. Kiernan and J.P. Jones resigned and were ultimately expelled from the party.

Prime Minister Joseph Lyons governed from 1932 to 1939 and was thus the leader responsible for stewarding Australia out of this difficult period. Lyons favoured the tough economic measures of the Premiers' Plan, pursued an orthodox fiscal policy and refused to accept NSW Premier Jack Lang's proposals to default on overseas debt repayments. Australia entered the Depression with a debt crisis and a credit crisis. According to author Anne Henderson of the Sydney Institute, Lyons held a steadfast belief in "the need to balance budgets, lower costs to business and restore confidence" and the Lyons period gave Australia "stability and eventual growth" between the drama of the Depression and the outbreak of the Second World War. A lowering of wages was enforced and industry tariff protections maintained, which together with cheaper raw materials during the 1930s saw a shift from agriculture to manufacturing as the chief employer of the Australian economy—a shift which was consolidated by increased investment by the commonwealth government into defence and armaments manufacture. Lyons saw restoration of Australia's exports as the key to economic recovery. A devalued Australian currency assisted in restoring a favourable balance of trade.

== See also ==
- Parliamentary Labor Party (SA)
- Lang Labor Party (South Australia)
- Australian Labor Party (South Australian Branch)
- History of Australia
- Great Depression in Australia
- Members of the South Australian House of Assembly, 1930–1933
- Members of the South Australian Legislative Council, 1930–1933
