= Lang Labor Party (South Australia) =

Former South Australian political party

The Lang Labor Party was a political party active in South Australia from 1931 to 1934, aligned with Lang Labor and the policies of Premier of New South Wales Jack Lang.

== Establishment ==
It was formed as a result of increasing tensions within the Australian Labor Party over the party's economic response to the Great Depression in Australia. The opponents of austerity in the Labor Party, of which Lang was among the most prominent figures, had supported repudiating Australia's debt, while supporters of austerity policies would subsequently introduce the national "Premiers' Plan" to achieve those ends. The 1931 Labor split occurred both at a state and federal level, with Lang's supporters being known as "Lang Labor".

By May 1931, the "Lang Plan Campaign Committee" had been formed in South Australia to give publicity to and campaign for Lang's ideas. Its members were not, at its inception, outside the Labor Party; however, the breach between Lang's supporters and the mainstream party quickly broadened, and reports that month suggested that a split in the party was imminent. The committee's president was Doug Bardolph, and its secretary was Tom Howard.

In July 1931, a by-election was held for the South Australian House of Assembly seat of Adelaide, in the wake of Labor MP Bert Edwards being sentenced to jail. The Lang Plan Campaign Committee decided to separately contest the by-election, and the secretary of the Ironworkers' Union, Martin Collaton, was chosen as their candidate. Collaton went on to win the by-election, in which he had been usually referred to as a "Lang Plan supporter" or a "Lang Plan candidate".

The supporters of Lang had begun being referred to as the "Lang Labor Party" by August 1931, by which time they had established local branches. In addition to Collaton, the party supported independent Labor state MP Bob Dale, who had been expelled from the Labor Party for supporting Lang's ideas, and who would later run for re-election under the party's banner. In October, the Lang Labor Party nominated Bardolph in a Legislative Council by-election for the Central District No. 1 seat and ran a significant campaign on his behalf, but saw him defeated by independent Joseph Anderson

== South Australian Lang Labor Party (SALLP) ==
Two of the three Lang Labor Party MHAs elected at the 1933 state election, Bob Dale and Tom Howard, left the party in 1933 post-election after falling out with leader Doug Bardolph and formed their own party, the South Australian Lang Labor Party (SALLP).

In June 1934, the four Labor factions were reunited.

== See also ==
- Australian Labor Party (South Australian Branch)
- Members of the South Australian House of Assembly, 1930–1933
- Members of the South Australian Legislative Council, 1930–1933
