= Australian Labor Party split of 1931 =

Factional split in Australian political party

The Australian Labor Party split of 1931 was caused by severe divisions within the Australian Labor Party (ALP) over its economic response to the Great Depression. Amidst intense disagreement between economically conservative and radical elements of the party, two senior ministers in the Scullin Labor government, Joseph Lyons and James Fenton, resigned from Cabinet in January 1931. Lyons, Fenton and their supporters would subsequently merge with the conservative opposition Nationalist Party to form the new United Australia Party (UAP), led by Lyons with the last Nationalist leader, John Latham, as his deputy.

In March 1931, the Labor Party split on the left as well, when Eddie Ward – a supporter of radical anti-austerity New South Wales Premier Jack Lang – won a by-election, and was refused entry to the Labor caucus. Ward and five other Lang supporters formed a Lang Labor party on the crossbench, costing Scullin his majority. In November, Lang Labor supported a UAP no-confidence motion, bringing the Scullin government down and forcing an election in December 1931. The election resulted in a landslide victory for the UAP and the election of Lyons as Prime Minister. The two Labor factions were cut down to only 18 seats between them.

While Lang Labor went on eventually to be largely reabsorbed into the Labor Party, the United Australia Party continued to be the main conservative force in Australia until replaced by the Liberal Party of Australia in 1945.

== See also ==
- History of the Australian Labor Party#Great Depression and the split of 1931
- Australian Labor Party split of 1916
- Australian Labor Party split of 1955
