= Candidates of the 1927 South Australian state election =

This is a list of candidates of the 1927 South Australian state election. The conservative Liberal Federation and Country Party ran a combined ticket for this election, known as the "Pact".

== Retiring MPs ==
=== Labor ===
- John Stanley Verran (Port Adelaide) – lost preselection

=== Liberal Federation ===
- Robert Thomson Melrose MLC (Southern District) – retired

Murray Liberal MHA Harry Dove Young switched to the Legislative Council at this election, being elected unopposed to the seat vacated by Melrose in the Southern District.

== Legislative Assembly ==
Sitting members are shown in bold text. Successful candidates are marked with an asterisk.

Electorate	Labor candidates	Liberal–Country Pact candidates	Other candidates
Adelaide (3)	**Bill Denny***; **Bert Edwards***; **Herbert George***	Agnes Goode (Lib.); F. G. Hicks (Lib.); Donald Kerr (Lib.)	C. E. L. Skitch (Ind.)
Albert (2)	H. M. Dalziel; Richard McKenzie	**Malcolm McIntosh*** (C.P.); **Frederick McMillan*** (C.P.)	
Alexandra (3)		**Percy Heggaton*** (Lib.); **Herbert Hudd*** (Lib.); **George Laffer*** (Lib.)	
Barossa (3)	**George Cooke***; **Leonard Hopkins**	**Henry Crosby*** (Lib.); Herbert Lyons (Lib.); Reginald Rudall (Lib.)	Herbert Basedow* (Ind.); A. P. Davies (Ind.)
Burra Burra (3)	**Albert Hawke**; **Sydney McHugh**; **Mick O'Halloran**	Reginald Carter* (C.P.); Samuel Dickson* (Lib.); George Jenkins* (Lib.)	
East Torrens (3)	J. F. Flaherty; **Leslie Claude Hunkin**; Beasley Kearney	**Frederick Coneybeer*** (Lib.); **Walter Hamilton*** (Lib.); Albert Sutton* (Lib.)	
Flinders (2)	**John O'Connor**; J. B. Pollard	Edward Coles* (C.P.); **James Moseley*** (Lib.)	Edward Craigie (Single Tax)
Murray (3)	**Clement Collins***; A. L. Gniel; **Frank Staniford**	Ernest Hannaford* (Lib.); Hermann Homburg* (Lib.); John Randell (Lib.)	John Godfree (Ind.)
Newcastle (2)	**Thomas Butterfield***; **William Harvey***	S. B. Castine (Lib.); Philip McBride (Lib.)	
North Adelaide (2)	**Frederick Birrell***; **Stanley Whitford**	Victor Marra Newland (Lib.); Shirley Jeffries* (Lib.)	
Port Pirie (2)	**John Fitzgerald***; **Lionel Hill***		
Port Adelaide (2)	**Frank Condon**; John Jonas*		Thomas Thompson* (Ind.)
Stanley (2)		**Robert Nicholls***; **John Lyons***	P. S. Gillen (Ind.)
Sturt (3)	Bob Dale; T. W. Grealy; Francis McCabe	**Ernest Anthoney*** (Lib.); **Herbert Richards*** (Lib.); **Edward Vardon*** (Lib.)	E. E. Craig (Ind.)
Victoria (2)	**Eric Shepherd***; F. E. Young	Vernon Petherick (Lib.); **Peter Reidy*** (Lib.)	
Wallaroo (2)	**John Pedler***; **Robert Richards***		
West Torrens (2)	**Alfred Blackwell***; **John McInnes***		R. A. Cilento (Ind.)
Wooroora (3)	William Jarrad; R. R. Reincke; **Allan Robertson**	**Richard Layton Butler*** (Lib.); Archie Cameron* (C.P.); **James McLachlan*** (Lib.)	
Yorke Peninsula (2)		**Edward Giles***; **Henry Tossell***	

== Legislative Council ==
Electorate	Labor candidates	Liberal–Country Pact candidates
		|
Central District No. 1 (2)	John Carr*; James Jelley*	H. P. Butterworth (Lib.); L. H. Crosby (Lib.)
Central District No. 2 (2)	Herbert Baldock; F. E. Stratton	John Herbert Cooke* (Lib.); George Henry Prosser* (Lib.)
Midland District (2)		'Walter Hannaford* (Lib.); Thomas Pascoe* (Lib.)
Northern District (2)	Even George; H. R. McHugh	Percy Blesing* (C.P.); William George Mills* (C.P.)
Southern District (2)		'Thomas McCallum* (Lib.); Harry Dove Young* (Lib.)
