= Candidates of the 1924 South Australian state election =

1924 SA Election Candidates

This is a list of candidates of the 1924 South Australian state election.

== Retiring MPs ==
=== Liberal Federation ===
- John Godfree (Murray) – lost preselection
- Joseph Anthony Harper (East Torrens) – retired
- George Hussey (Sturt) – lost preselection

Two vacancies for the Northern District in the Legislative Council had remained unfilled following the deaths of John Lewis on 25 August 1923 and John George Bice on 9 November 1923. Both MLCs were not due to be up for re-election in 1924, and their seats were filled at the election in addition to the two Northern District seats that would normally have been contested.

== House of Assembly ==
Sitting members are shown in bold text. Successful candidates are marked with an asterisk.

Electorate	Labor candidates	Liberal candidates	Country candidates	Single Tax candidates	Independent candidates
Adelaide (3)	**Bill Denny***; **Bert Edwards***; John Gunn*	Agnes Goode			Joshua Pedlar
Albert (2)		P. J. Edwards; F. S. Wyllie	**Malcolm McIntosh***; **Frederick McMillan***		
Alexandra (3)	A. P. Davies; H. H. Newell; Q. J. Pearce	**Percy Heggaton***; **Herbert Hudd***; **George Laffer***	F. G. Ayres; J. M. Cheriton; Walter Furler		
Barossa (3)	George Cooke*; Leonard Hopkins*; Tom Howard	**Richard Butler**; **Henry Crosby**; **William Hague***	Herbert Basedow		
Burra Burra (3)	Albert Hawke*; Sydney McHugh*; Mick O'Halloran*	**Samuel Dickson**; **George Jenkins**; Francis Jettner	**Thomas Hawke**; Archibald McDonald; Reginald Carter		
East Torrens (3)	Herbert George; **Leslie Claude Hunkin***; Harry Kneebone*	Frederick Coneybeer*; **Walter Hamilton**; Albert Sutton			
Flinders (2)	John O'Connor*; J. B. Pollard	Frank Masters; **James Moseley***	E. J. Barraud; **John Chapman**	Edward Craigie; H. E. Frick	
Murray (3)	Clement Collins*; Frank Staniford*; M. B. Woods	Hermann Homburg; **John Randell**; **Harry Dove Young***			
Newcastle (2)	**Thomas Butterfield***; **William Harvey***	C. P. Butler			
North Adelaide (2)	**Frederick Birrell***; **Stanley Whitford***	William Angus; Shirley Jeffries			
Port Adelaide (2)	**John Price***; Frank Condon*	J. M. Lambert			
Port Pirie (2)	**John Fitzgerald***; **Lionel Hill***				
Stanley (2)		**Robert Nicholls***; **Henry Barwell***	J. J. Aughey; Oliver Badman		Duncan Menzies
Sturt (3)	T. W. Grealy; Frank Lundie; John Stanley Verran ^{[1]}	**Ernest Anthoney***; **Herbert Richards***; Edward Vardon*			
Victoria (2)	J. M. O'Connell; Eric Shepherd*	**Vernon Petherick**; **Peter Reidy***			
Wallaroo (2)	**John Pedler***; **Robert Richards***	J. B. K. Dunstone; John Verran			Richard Gully
Wooroora (3)	Allan Robertson*; Horace Bowden; A. A. Tonkin	**Richard Layton Butler***; **James McLachlan***; **Albert Robinson**	Archie Cameron; Oscar Duhst; H. H. Queale		
West Torrens (2)	**Alfred Blackwell***; **John McInnes***				
Yorke Peninsula (2)		**Peter Allen***; **Henry Tossell***	H. A. Montgomery; Alfred Rodda		

== Legislative Council ==
Electorate	Labor candidates	Liberal candidates	Country candidates
Central District No. 1 (2)	Tom Gluyas*; Andrew Kirkpatrick*	William Senior; William Story	
Central District No. 2 (2)	John Daly; A. G. Roberts	William Humphrey Harvey*; Henry Tassie*	
Midland District (2)	W. A. E. Fail; E. J. L. Stokes	Walter Gordon Duncan*; David Gordon*	
Northern District (4)	Even George	J. S. Geddes; Lyell McEwin; William Morrow*; George Ritchie*	Percy Blesing*; Maurice Collins; William George Mills*; L. E. Travers
Southern District (2)		John Cowan*; Lancelot Stirling*	

== Notes ==
^{1} John Stanley Verran, an incumbent Labor MHA for Port Adelaide, was defeated for Labor preselection in his seat by Frank Condon, and contested Sturt instead.
