= Candidates of the 1930 South Australian state election =

This is a list of candidates of the 1930 South Australian state election. The conservative Liberal Federation and Country Party, which had run a combined ticket known as the "Pact" in 1927, ran separately in 1930.

== Retiring MPs ==
=== Liberal Federation ===
- Edward Coles (Flinders) – retired
- Francis Jettner (Burra Burra) – retired
- James McLachlan (Wooroora) – retired
- Henry Tossell (Yorke Peninsula) – retired

Thomas Thompson, the Independent Protestant Labor MHA for Port Adelaide, unsuccessfully attempted to switch to the Legislative Council at this election, contesting Central District No. 1.

== Legislative Assembly ==
Sitting members are shown in bold text. Successful candidates are marked with an asterisk.

Electorate	Labor candidates	Liberal candidates	Country candidates	Other candidates
Adelaide (3)	**Bill Denny***; **Bert Edwards***; **Herbert George***			James Cullen (Communist); A. W. Wilson (Ind. Socialist Labor)
Albert (2)	H. M. Dalziel; Richard McKenzie	**Malcolm McIntosh***; **Frederick McMillan***	A. A. Petch; E. M. Rowe	
Alexandra (3)		**Percy Heggaton***; **Herbert Hudd***; **George Laffer***	F. G. Ayres; W. L. Scarborough; Lindsay Yelland	
Barossa (3)	**George Cooke***; Thomas Edwards*; Leonard Hopkins*	**Henry Crosby**; Herbert Lyons		**Herbert Basedow** (Ind.); H. N. Barnes (People's Party); R. A. Thompson (People's Party)
Burra Burra (3)	Jack Critchley*; Even George*; Sydney McHugh*	**Reginald Carter**; **George Jenkins**; Philip McBride		
East Torrens (3)	Beasley Kearney*; Frank Nieass*; Arthur McArthur*	**Frederick Coneybeer**; **Walter Hamilton**; **Albert Sutton**		
Flinders (2)	M. A. Cronin; D. O. Whait	A. W. H. Barns; **James Moseley***	E. J. Barraud; A. B. Wishart	Edward Craigie* (Single Tax); John O'Connor (Ind. Labor)
Murray (3)	**Clement Collins***; **Robert Hunter***; **Frank Staniford***	George Cummins Morphett; Thomas Playford IV; Howard Shannon		R. A. Cilento (Ind.)
Newcastle (2)	**Thomas Butterfield***; **William Harvey***			
North Adelaide (2)	**Frederick Birrell***; Walter Warne*	**Shirley Jeffries**; Victor Marra Newland		
Port Pirie (2)	**John Fitzgerald***; **Lionel Hill***			
Port Adelaide (2)	**John Jonas***; Albert Thompson*			H. G. Butler (Ind. Protestant Labor); Joshua Pedlar (Ind. Protestant Labor)
Stanley (2)		**Robert Nicholls***; **John Lyons***	Oliver Badman; H. V. Sargent	
Sturt (3)	Bob Dale*; Edgar Dawes*; T. W. Grealy	**Ernest Anthoney***; **Herbert Richards**; **Edward Vardon**		Leonora Polkinghorne (Women's Non-Party)
Victoria (2)	**Eric Shepherd***; F. E. Young	Vernon Petherick; **Peter Reidy***		
West Torrens (2)	**Alfred Blackwell***; **John McInnes***			L. H. Crosby (Ind. Labor); C. J. Caldicott (Ind. Labor); T. C. McGillick (Communist)
Wallaroo (2)	**Robert Richards***; **John Pedler***			F. G. Filmer (Ind.); R. C. Kitto (Ind.); William Price (Ind.)
Wooroora (3)		**Richard Layton Butler***; W. J. Marshman; F. H. Heinrich	**Archie Cameron***; Samuel Dennison*; B. H. Richardson	
Yorke Peninsula (2)		**Edward Giles***; Baden Pattinson*	J. S. Honner; Stepney Pontifex	

== Legislative Council ==
Electorate	Labor candidates	Liberal candidates	Country candidates	Other candidates
Central District No. 1 (2)	Frank Condon*; Tom Gluyas*			J. J. Luxton (Ind. Protestant Labor); Thomas Thompson (Ind. Protestant Labor)
Central District No. 2 (2)	A. G. Angell; F. E. Stratton	William Humphrey Harvey*; Henry Tassie*		
Midland District (2)		Walter Gordon Duncan*; David Gordon*	Maurice Collins; James Nairn	
Northern District (2)	James Beerworth; H. R. McHugh	William Morrow*; George Ritchie*	Archibald McDonald	
Southern District (2)	Peter Crafter; Maurice Parish	John Cowan*; Lancelot Stirling*	C. W. Lloyd; Richard Alfred O'Connor	
