= Results of the 1927 South Australian state election (House of Assembly) =

South Australian state election, 26 March 1927 House of Assembly << 1924–1930 >>
Enrolled voters	309,588				
Votes cast	214,738		Turnout	77.43%	+14.71%
Informal votes	3,943		Informal	N/A	
Summary of votes by party
Party	Primary votes	%	Swing	Seats	Change
Labor	243,450	47.99%	+0.65%	16	– 11
Liberal Federation	203,050	40.02%	–1.68%	23	+ 6
Country	27,617	5.44%	–3.56%	5	+ 3
Protestant Labour	10,560	2.08%	+2.08%	1	+ 1
Single Tax League	1,923	0.40%	–0.20%	0	± 0
Independent	20,720	5.10%	+4.60%	1	+ 1
Total	507,320			46	

This is a list of House of Assembly results for the 1927 South Australian state election. Each district elected multiple members.

Every voter would receive a ballot paper where they would cast two or three votes for different candidates. In electorates that were not unopposed, the two or three candidates with the most votes would be elected.

== Results by electoral district ==
=== Adelaide ===
1927 South Australian state election: Adelaide
Party	Candidate	Votes	%	±%
Labor	Bill Denny (elected)	7,412	25.4	−4.8
Labor	Bert Edwards (elected)	7,149	24.5	−5.1
Labor	Herbert George (elected)	7,095	24.3	+24.3
Liberal Federation	Donald Kerr	2,688	9.2	+9.2
Liberal Federation	Francis Hicks	2,200	7.5	+7.5
Liberal Federation	Agnes Goode	2,189	7.5	+0.7
Independent	Cecil Skitch	503	1.7	+1.7
Total formal votes		29,236; 10,299 ballots	97.5	−0.5
Informal votes		266	2.5	+0.5
Turnout		10,565	73.4	+22.7
Party total votes
Labor		21,656	74.1	−16.9
Liberal Federation		7,077	24.2	+17.4
Independent	Cecil Skitch	503	1.7	+1.7

=== Albert ===
1927 South Australian state election: Albert
Party	Candidate	Votes	%	±%
Country	Malcolm McIntosh (elected)	5,809	29.7	−8.5
Country	Frederick McMillan (elected)	5,643	28.9	−8.5
Labor	Richard McKenzie	4,092	20.9	+20.9
Labor	Henry Dalziel	4,000	20.5	+20.5
Total formal votes		19,544; 10,067 ballots	98.8	−0.6
Informal votes		120	1.2	+0.6
Turnout		10,187	76.1	+22.8
Party total votes
Country		11,452	58.6	−17.0
Labor		8,092	41.4	+41.4

=== Alexandra ===
1927 South Australian state election: Alexandra
Party	Candidate	Votes	%	±%
Liberal Federation	Percy Heggaton (elected)	unopposed		
Liberal Federation	Herbert Hudd (elected)	unopposed		
Liberal Federation	George Laffer (elected)	unopposed		

=== Barossa ===
1927 South Australian state election: Barossa
Party	Candidate	Votes	%	±%
Independent	Herbert Basedow (elected)	5,766	18.4	+10.2
Labor	George Cooke (elected)	5,241	16.7	+0.4
Liberal Federation	Henry Crosby (elected)	5,152	16.4	+1.1
Liberal Federation	Reginald Rudall	5,056	16.1	+16.1
Labor	Leonard Hopkins	5,014	16.0	+0.4
Liberal Federation	Herbert Lyons	4,870	15.5	+15.5
Independent	Albert Davies	282	0.9	+0.9
Total formal votes		31,371; 10,816 ballots	98.9	+0.4
Informal votes		123	1.1	−0.4
Turnout		10,939	86.0	+15.6
Party total votes
Liberal Federation		15,078	48.0	+1.9
Labor		10,255	32.7	+0.8
Independent	Herbert Basedow	5,766	18.4	+10.2
Independent	Albert Davies	282	0.9	+0.9

=== Burra Burra ===
1927 South Australian state election: Burra Burra
Party	Candidate	Votes	%	±%
Liberal Federation	George Jenkins (elected)	5,719	17.6	+5.0
Country	Reginald Carter (elected)	5,420	16.7	+11.6
Liberal Federation	Francis Jettner (elected)	5,407	16.7	+5.8
Labor	Albert Hawke	5,396	16.7	+1.9
Labor	Sydney McHugh	5,239	16.2	+1.2
Labor	Mick O'Halloran	5,231	16.1	+0.1
Total formal votes		32,412; 11,040 ballots	98.8	+0.8
Informal votes		133	1.2	−0.8
Turnout		11,173	82.5	+13.5
Party total votes
Labor		15,866	49.0	+3.2
Liberal Federation		11,126	34.3	−1.7
Country		5,420	16.7	−1.6

=== East Torrens ===
1927 South Australian state election: East Torrens
Party	Candidate	Votes	%	±%
Liberal Federation	Frederick Coneybeer (elected)	15,372	20.1	+3.3
Liberal Federation	Walter Hamilton (elected)	14,330	18.8	+3.1
Liberal Federation	Albert Sutton (elected)	13,790	18.1	+2.4
Labor	Leslie Hunkin	12,619	16.5	−1.6
Labor	Beasley Kearney	10,111	13.2	+13.2
Labor	James Flaherty	10,109	13.2	+13.2
Total formal votes		76,331; 26,387 ballots	98.2	−0.8
Informal votes		494	1.8	+0.8
Turnout		26,881	75.8	+13.1
Party total votes
Liberal Federation		43,492	57.0	+8.8
Labor		32,839	43.0	−8.8

=== Flinders ===
1927 South Australian state election: Flinders
Party	Candidate	Votes	%	±%
Liberal Federation	James Moseley (elected)	3,680	25.6	+8.1
Country	Edward Coles (elected)	3,459	24.0	+24.0
Labor	John O'Connor	3,318	23.1	+8.7
Labor	James Pollard	2,017	14.0	+14.0
Single Tax League	Edward Craigie	1,923	13.4	+3.0
Total formal votes		14,397; 7,704 ballots	98.2	−0.4
Informal votes		140	1.8	+0.4
Turnout		7,844	75.5	+11.7
Party total votes
Labor		5,335	37.1	+8.5
Liberal Federation		3,680	25.6	−2.7
Country		3,459	24.0	0.0
Single Tax League		1,923	13.4	−5.8

=== Murray ===
1927 South Australian state election: Murray
Party	Candidate	Votes	%	±%
Labor	Clement Collins (elected)	5,031	17.0	−0.7
Liberal Federation	Hermann Homburg (elected)	4,993	16.8	+1.0
Liberal Federation	Ernest Hannaford (elected)	4,893	16.5	+16.5
Liberal Federation	John Randell	4,715	15.9	−0.6
Labor	Frank Staniford	4,327	14.6	−3.1
Labor	Alec Gniel	4,158	14.0	+14.0
Independent	John Godfree	1,561	5.3	+5.3
Total formal votes		29,678; 10,191 ballots	98.4	−1.0
Informal votes		172	1.6	+1.0
Turnout		10.363	83.2	+19.6
Party total votes
Liberal Federation		14,601	49.2	−0.5
Labor		13,516	45.6	−4.7
Independent	John Godfree	1,561	5.3	+5.3

=== Newcastle ===
1927 South Australian state election: Newcastle
Party	Candidate	Votes	%	±%
Labor	Thomas Butterfield (elected)	2,776	30.5	−9.4
Labor	William Harvey (elected)	2,678	29.5	−8.2
Liberal Federation	Philip McBride	1,853	20.4	+20.4
Country	Sydney Castine	1,785	19.6	+19.6
Total formal votes		9,092; 4,670 ballots	98.2	−0.1
Informal votes		85	1.8	+0.1
Turnout		4,755	76.5	+12.1
Party total votes
Labor		5,454	60.0	−17.6
Liberal Federation		1,853	20.4	−2.0
Country		1,785	19.6	+19.6

=== North Adelaide ===
1927 South Australian state election: North Adelaide
Party	Candidate	Votes	%	±%
Labor	Frederick Birrell (elected)	7,875	25.5	−2.0
Liberal Federation	Shirley Jeffries (elected)	7,811	25.3	+2.1
Liberal Federation	Victor Newland	7,705	25.0	+25.0
Labor	Stanley Whitford	7,450	24.2	−2.9
Total formal votes		30,841; 15,765 ballots	97.8	−1.2
Informal votes		352	2.2	+1.2
Turnout		16,117	78.0	+15.4
Party total votes
Liberal Federation		15,516	50.3	+4.9
Labor		15,325	49.7	−4.9

=== Port Adelaide ===
1927 South Australian state election: Port Adelaide
Party	Candidate	Votes	%	±%
Labor	John Jonas (elected)	14,512	40.9	+40.9
Protestant Labour	Thomas Thompson (elected)	10,560	29.8	+29.8
Labor	Frank Condon	10,375	29.3	−11.7
Total formal votes		35,447; 20,507 ballots	98.4	−0.6
Informal votes		334	1.6	+0.6
Turnout		20,841	77.2	+13.1
Party total votes
Labor		24,887	70.2	−15.2
Protestant Labour		10,560	29.8	+29.8

=== Port Pirie ===
1927 South Australian state election: Port Pirie
Party	Candidate	Votes	%	±%
Labor	John Fitzgerald (elected)	unopposed		
Labor	Lionel Hill (elected)	unopposed		

=== Stanley ===
1927 South Australian state election: Stanley
Party	Candidate	Votes	%	±%
Liberal Federation	John Lyons (elected)	5,066	39.8	+39.8
Liberal Federation	Robert Nicholls (elected)	5,002	29.3	−1.3
Independent	Peter Gillen	2,648	20.8	+20.8
Total formal votes		12,716; 7,530 ballots	98.3	+0.1
Informal votes		130	1.7	−0.1
Turnout		7,660	79.8	+9.8
Party total votes
Liberal Federation		10,068	79.2	+22.4
Independent	Peter Gillen	2,648	20.8	+20.8

=== Sturt ===
1927 South Australian state election: Sturt
Party	Candidate	Votes	%	±%
Liberal Federation	Herbert Richards (elected)	19,642	19.1	+1.4
Liberal Federation	Ernest Anthoney (elected)	19,485	19.0	+1.5
Liberal Federation	Edward Vardon (elected)	18,939	18.4	+1.3
Labor	Bob Dale	14,114	13.7	+13.7
Labor	Thomas Grealy	14,015	13.6	−2.9
Labor	Francis McCabe	13,417	13.1	+13.1
Independent	Edmund Craig	3,162	3.1	+3.1
Total formal votes		102,774; 35,272 ballots	97.6	−1.6
Informal votes		865	2.4	+1.6
Turnout		36,137	75.3	+17.5
Party total votes
Liberal Federation		58,066	56.5	+4.2
Labor		41,546	40.4	−7.3
Independent	Edward Craig	3,162	3.1	+3.1

=== Victoria ===
1927 South Australian state election: Victoria
Party	Candidate	Votes	%	±%
Liberal Federation	Peter Reidy (elected)	6,079	29.1	+1.7
Labor	Eric Shepherd (elected)	5,410	25.9	+0.1
Liberal Federation	Vernon Petherick	5,122	24.5	−0.1
Labor	Francis Young	4,291	20.5	+20.5
Total formal votes		20,902; 10,630 ballots	99.2	−0.1
Informal votes		81	0.8	+0.1
Turnout		10,711	89.4	+14.8
Party total votes
Liberal Federation		11,201	53.6	+1.6
Labor		9,701	46.4	−1.6

=== Wallaroo ===
1927 South Australian state election: Wallaroo
Party	Candidate	Votes	%	±%
Labor	John Pedler (elected)	unopposed		
Labor	Robert Richards (elected)	unopposed		

=== West Torrens ===
1927 South Australian state election: West Torrens
Party	Candidate	Votes	%	±%
Labor	Alfred Blackwell (elected)	15,549	42.3	
Labor	John McInnes (elected)	14,369	39.1	
Independent	Raphael Cilento	6,808	18.5	
Total formal votes		36,726; 21,103 ballots	97.4	
Informal votes		572	2.6	
Turnout		21,675	71.2	
Party total votes
Labor		29,918	82.5	
Independent	Raphael Cilento	6,808	18.5	

=== Wooroora ===
}

1927 South Australian state election: Wooroora
Party	Candidate	Votes	%	±%
Liberal Federation	James McLachlan (elected)	5,719	22.1	+8.7
Liberal Federation	Richard Butler (elected)	5,573	21.6	+8.9
Country	Archie Cameron (elected)	5,501	21.3	+11.5
Labor	Allan Robertson	3,370	13.0	+0.9
Labor	Reginald Reincke	2,857	11.1	+11.1
Labor	William Jarrad	2,833	11.0	+11.0
Total formal votes		25,853; 8,814 ballots	99.1	−0.1
Informal votes		76	0.9	+0.1
Turnout		8,890	80.3	+7.4
Party total votes
Liberal Federation		11,292	43.7	+5.7
Labor		9,060	35.1	+0.7
Country		5,501	21.3	−6.4

=== Yorke Peninsula ===
1927 South Australian state election: Yorke Peninsula
Party	Candidate	Votes	%	±%
Liberal Federation	Edward Giles (elected)	unopposed		
Liberal Federation	Henry Tossell (elected)	unopposed		

== See also ==
- Candidates of the 1927 South Australian state election
- Members of the South Australian House of Assembly, 1927–1930
