= Results of the 1924 South Australian state election (House of Assembly) =

South Australian state election, 5 April 1924 House of Assembly << 1921–1927 >>
Enrolled voters	289,843				
Votes cast	161,165		Turnout	62.71%	-1.06%
Informal votes	1,774		Informal	N/A	
Summary of votes by party
Party	Primary votes	%	Swing	Seats	Change
Labor	192,256	48.35%	+3.73%	27	+ 11
Liberal Federation	165,802	41.70%	+6.80%	17	8
Country	35,551	8.94%	+4.85%	2	2
Protestant Labour	10,560	2.08%	+2.08%	1	+ 1
Single Tax League	1,923	0.40%	–0.20%	0	± 0
Independent	20,720	5.10%	+4.60%	1	+ 1
Total	507,320			46	

This is a list of House of Assembly results for the 1924 South Australian state election. Each district elected multiple members.

Every voter would receive a ballot paper where they would cast 2 or 3 votes for different candidates. In electorates that were not unopposed, the 2 or 3 candidates with the most votes would be elected.

== Results by electoral district ==
=== Adelaide ===
1924 South Australian state election: Adelaide
Party	Candidate	Votes	%	±%
Labor	John Gunn (elected)	7,013	31.2	+0.1
Labor	Bill Denny (elected)	6,786	30.2	−0.3
Labor	Bert Edwards (elected)	6,653	29.6	+1.4
Liberal Federation	Agnes Goode	1,526	6.8	+6.8
Independent	Joshua Pedlar	471	2.1	+2.1
Total formal votes		22,449; 8,288 ballots	98.0	−0.1
Informal votes		167	2.0	+0.1
Turnout		8,455	50.7	−0.6
Party total votes
Labor		20,452	91.1	+1.3
Liberal Federation		1,526	6.8	+6.8
Independent		471	2.1	+2.1

=== Albert ===
1924 South Australian state election: Albert
Party	Candidate	Votes	%	±%
Country	Malcolm McIntosh (elected)	4,929	38.2	+19.5
Country	Frederick McMillan (elected)	4,822	37.4	+18.8
Liberal Federation	P J Edwards	1,644	12.8	+12.8
Liberal Federation	F S Wyllie	1,498	11.6	+11.6
Total formal votes		12,893; 6,473 ballots	99.4	+1.3
Informal votes		109	0.6	−1.3
Turnout		6,510	53.3	−3.0
Party total votes
Country		9,751	75.6	+38.3
Liberal Federation		3,142	24.4	−11.8

=== Alexandra ===
1924 South Australian state election: Alexandra
Party	Candidate	Votes	%	±%
Liberal Federation	Percy Heggaton (elected)	3,719	18.7	+18.7
Liberal Federation	Herbert Hudd (elected)	3,671	18.5	−8.3
Liberal Federation	George Laffer (elected)	3,586	18.1	−9.3
Labor	Albert Davies	1,914	9.6	+9.6
Labor	Harold Pearce	1,866	9.4	+9.4
Labor	Harry Newell	1,841	9.3	+9.3
Country	Frederick Ayers	1,181	6.0	+6.0
Country	James Cheriton	1,046	5.3	+5.3
Country	Walter Furler	1,024	5.2	−2.4
Total formal votes		19,848; 6,743 ballots	99.3	+0.5
Informal votes		46	0.7	−0.5
Turnout		6,789	54.6	+2.7
Party total votes
Liberal Federation		10,976	55.3	−26.6
Labor		5,621	28.3	+17.7
Country		3,251	16.4	+8.8

=== Barossa ===
1924 South Australian state election: Barossa
Party	Candidate	Votes	%	±%
Labor	George Cooke (elected)	4,015	16.3	+1.3
Liberal Federation	William Hague (elected)	4,007	16.3	−2.4
Labor	Leonard Hopkins (elected)	3,833	15.6	+1.7
Liberal Federation	Henry Crosby	3,776	15.3	−3.0
Liberal Federation	Richard Butler	3,574	14.5	−2.3
Labor	Tom Howard	3,407	13.8	+13.8
Independent	Herbert Basedow	2,017	8.2	+8.2
Total formal votes		24,629; 8,497 ballots	98.5	−0.5
Informal votes		133	1.5	+0.5
Turnout		8,630	70.4	−4.0
Party total votes
Liberal Federation		11,357	46.1	−7.7
Labor		11,255	45.7	+3.8
Independent	Herbert Basedow	2,017	8.2	+8.2

=== Burra Burra ===
1924 South Australian state election: Burra Burra
Party	Candidate	Votes	%	±%
Labor	Mick O'Halloran (elected)	4,246	16.0	+1.1
Labor	Sydney McHugh (elected)	3,972	15.0	+15.0
Labor	Albert Hawke (elected)	3,915	14.8	+14.8
Liberal Federation	George Jenkins	3,334	12.6	−3.6
Liberal Federation	Samuel Dickson	3,313	12.5	−2.8
Liberal Federation	Francis Jettner	2,900	10.9	+10.9
Country	Thomas Hawke	1,831	6.9	−9.7
Country	Archibald McDonald	1,676	6.3	+6.3
Country	Reginald Carter	1,359	5.1	+5.1
Total formal votes		26,546; 8,964 ballots	98.0	−0.6
Informal votes		185	2.0	+0.6
Turnout		9,149	69.0	+0.1
Party total votes
Labor		12,133	45.8	+2.6
Liberal Federation		9,547	36.0	+4.5
Country		4,866	18.3	+1.7

=== East Torrens ===
1924 South Australian state election: East Torrens
Party	Candidate	Votes	%	±%
Labor	Leslie Hunkin (elected)	10,760	18.1	+5.3
Labor	Harry Kneebone (elected)	10,173	17.1	+17.1
Liberal Federation	Frederick Coneybeer (elected)	9,948	16.8	+6.8
Labor	Herbert George	9,912	16.7	+4.6
Liberal Federation	Walter Hamilton	9,310	15.7	+1.6
Liberal Federation	Albert Sutton	9,301	15.7	−3.1
Total formal votes		59,404; 20,122 ballots	99.0	+0.1
Informal votes		194	1.0	−0.1
Turnout		20,316	62.7	−0.5
Party total votes
Labor		30,845	51.9	+15.3
Liberal Federation		28,559	48.1	+8.1

=== Flinders ===
1924 South Australian state election: Flinders
Party	Candidate	Votes	%	±%
Liberal Federation	James Moseley (elected)	1,987	17.5	−8.7
Labor	John O'Connor (elected)	1,631	14.4	+14.4
Labor	James Pollard	1,605	14.2	+14.2
Country	John Chapman	1,458	12.9	−11.7
Country	Edwin Barraud	1,261	11.1	+11.1
Liberal Federation	Frank Masters	1,229	10.8	+10.8
Single Tax League	Edward Craigie	1,176	10.4	+10.4
Single Tax League	Harr Frick	1,000	8.8	−2.7
Total formal votes		11,347; 5,768 ballots	98.6	+0.2
Informal votes		83	1.4	−0.2
Turnout		5,851	63.8	+2.4
Party total votes
Labor		3,236	28.6	+4.4
Liberal Federation		3,216	28.3	+2.1
Country		2,719	24.0	−0.6
Single Tax League		2,176	19.2	+19.2

=== Murray ===
1924 South Australian state election: Murray
Party	Candidate	Votes	%	±%
Labor	Frank Staniford (elected)	4,212	17.7	+3.9
Liberal Federation	Harry Young (elected)	4,126	17.4	−1.7
Labor	Clement Collins (elected)	3,975	16.7	+16.7
Liberal Federation	John Randell	3,927	16.5	−0.5
Labor	Michael Woods	3,789	15.9	+15.9
Liberal Federation	Hermann Homburg	3,745	15.8	+15.8
Total formal votes		23,774; 8,097 ballots	99.4	+0.2
Informal votes		51	0.6	−0.2
Turnout		8,148	63.6	+2.3
Party total votes
Labor		11,976	50.3	+10.0
Liberal Federation		11,798	49.7	−3.9

=== Newcastle ===
1924 South Australian state election: Newcastle
Party	Candidate	Votes	%	±%
Labor	Thomas Butterfield (elected)	2,905	39.9	+9.5
Labor	William Harvey (elected)	2,745	37.7	+9.3
Liberal Federation	Charles Butler	1,627	22.4	+22.4
Total formal votes		7,277; 4,350 ballots	98.3	−0.6
Informal votes		74	1.7	+0.6
Turnout		4,424	64.4	+4.8
Party total votes
Labor		5,650	77.6	+18.8
Liberal Federation		1,627	22.4	+0.9

=== North Adelaide ===
1924 South Australian state election: North Adelaide
Party	Candidate	Votes	%	±%
Labor	Frederick Birrell (elected)	6,329	27.5	+4.4
Labor	Stanley Whitford (elected)	6,229	27.1	+5.0
Liberal Federation	Shirley Jeffries	5,343	23.2	+23.2
Liberal Federation	William Angus	5,095	22.2	+22.2
Total formal votes		22,996; 11,678 ballots	99.0	+0.4
Informal votes		114	1.0	−0.4
Turnout		11,792	62.6	−2.8
Party total votes
Labor		12,558	54.6	+9.4
Liberal Federation		10,438	45.4	+23.8

=== Port Adelaide ===
1924 South Australian state election: Port Adelaide
Party	Candidate	Votes	%	±%
Labor	John Price (elected)	11,928	44.4	+8.9
Labor	Frank Condon (elected)	10,996	41.0	+41.0
Liberal Federation	Joseph Lambert	3,920	14.6	−1.7
Total formal votes		26,844; 14,954 ballots	99.0	−0.1
Informal votes		151	1.0	+0.1
Turnout		15,105	64.1	+3.0
Party total votes
Labor		22,924	85.4	+16.5
Liberal Federation		3,920	14.6	−0.1

=== Port Pirie ===
1924 South Australian state election: Port Pirie
Party	Candidate	Votes	%	±%
Labor	John Fitzgerald (elected)	unopposed		
Labor	Lionel Hill (elected)	unopposed		

=== Stanley ===
1924 South Australian state election: Stanley
Party	Candidate	Votes	%	±%
Liberal Federation	Robert Nicholls (elected)	3,807	30.6	−0.9
Liberal Federation	Henry Barwell (elected)	3,261	26.2	−4.7
Country	Oliver Badman	2,349	18.9	+18.9
Country	John Aughey	1,763	14.2	+8.6
Independent	Duncan Menzies	1,247	10.0	+10.0
Total formal votes		12,427; 6,450 ballots	98.2	+0.6
Informal votes		163	1.8	−0.6
Turnout		6,566	70.0	−3.0
Party total votes
Liberal Federation		7,068	56.9	−5.5
Country		4,112	33.1	+21.3
Independent	Duncan Menzies	1,247	10.0	+10.0

=== Sturt ===
1924 South Australian state election: Sturt
Party	Candidate	Votes	%	±%
Liberal Federation	Herbert Richards (elected)	12,041	17.7	+3.5
Liberal Federation	Ernest Anthoney (elected)	11,924	17.5	+4.0
Liberal Federation	Edward Vardon (elected)	11,667	17.1	+17.1
Labor	Thomas Grealy	11,212	16.5	+6.1
Labor	John Verran	10,771	15.8	+15.8
Labor	Frank Lundie	10,516	15.4	+15.4
Total formal votes		68,131; 23,112 ballots	99.2	+0.2
Informal votes		177	0.8	−0.2
Turnout		23,289	57.8	−6.4
Party total votes
Liberal Federation		35,632	52.3	+11.1
Labor		32,499	47.7	+16.2

=== Victoria ===
1924 South Australian state election: Victoria
Party	Candidate	Votes	%	±%
Liberal Federation	Peter Reidy (elected)	4,943	27.4	−0.1
Labor	Eric Shepherd (elected)	4,655	25.8	+1.8
Liberal Federation	Vernon Petherick	4,443	24.6	−2.0
Labor	James Connell	3,994	22.2	+22.2
Total formal votes		18,035; 9,089 ballots	99.3	0.0
Informal votes		60	0.7	0.0
Turnout		9,149	74.6	+4.8
Party total votes
Liberal Federation		9,386	52.0	+25.4
Labor		8,649	48.0	+2.1

=== Wallaroo ===
1924 South Australian state election: Wallaroo
Party	Candidate	Votes	%	±%
Labor	Robert Richards (elected)	3,256	33.0	−2.2
Labor	John Pedler (elected)	3,118	31.6	−2.5
Liberal Federation	John Verran	1,848	18.8	−11.9
Liberal Federation	John Dunstone	1,526	15.5	+15.5
Independent	Richard Gully	109	1.1	+1.1
Total formal votes		9,857; 5,003 ballots	98.9	−0.6
Informal votes		58	1.1	+0.6
Turnout		5,061	77.1	−3.0
Party total votes
Labor		6,374	64.7	−4.6
Liberal Federation		3,374	34.2	+34.2
Independent	Richard Gully	109	1.1	+1.1

=== West Torrens ===
1924 South Australian state election: West Torrens
Party	Candidate	Votes	%	±%
Labor	Alfred Blackwell (elected)	unopposed		
Labor	John McInnes (elected)	unopposed		

=== Wooroora ===
1924 South Australian state election: Wooroora
Party	Candidate	Votes	%	±%
Liberal Federation	James McLachlan (elected)	3,138	13.4	−5.3
Liberal Federation	Richard Butler (elected)	2,991	12.7	−5.3
Labor	Allan Robertson (elected)	2,846	12.1	−2.3
Liberal Federation	Albert Robinson	2,806	11.9	−3.8
Labor	Alfred Tonkin	2,647	11.3	−1.3
Labor	Horace Bowden	2,591	11.0	+11.0
Country	Archie Cameron	2,302	9.8	+9.8
Country	Henry Queale	2,104	9.0	+9.0
Country	Oscar Duhst	2,079	8.9	+8.9
Total formal votes		23,504; 7,929 ballots	99.2	0.0
Informal votes		67	0.8	0.0
Turnout		7,996	72.9	+1.2
Party total votes
Liberal Federation		8,935	38.0	−14.4
Labor		8,084	34.4	−5.5
Country		6,485	27.6	+27.6

=== Yorke Peninsula ===
1924 South Australian state election: Yorke Peninsula
Party	Candidate	Votes	%	±%
Liberal Federation	Henry Tossell (elected)	2,689	35.1	
Liberal Federation	Peter Allen (elected)	2,612	34.1	
Country	Alfred Rodda	1,253	16.4	
Country	H A Montgomery	1,097	14.3	
Total formal votes		7,651; 3,874 ballots	98.5	
Informal votes		61	1.5	
Turnout		3,935	56.0	
Party total votes
Liberal Federation		5,301	69.3	N/A
Country		2,350	30.7	N/A

== See also ==
- Candidates of the 1924 South Australian state election
- Members of the South Australian House of Assembly, 1924–1927
