= Members of the South Australian House of Assembly, 1927–1930 =

This is a list of members of the South Australian House of Assembly from 1927 to 1930, as elected at the 1927 state election:

Name	Party	Electorate	Term of office
Ernest Anthoney	Liberal	Sturt	1921–1938
Dr Herbert Basedow	Independent	Barossa	1927–1930, 1933
Frederick Birrell	Labor	North Adelaide	1921–1933
Alfred Blackwell	Labor	West Torrens	1918–1938
Richard Layton Butler	Liberal	Wooroora	1915–1918, 1921–1938
Thomas Butterfield	Labor	Newcastle	1915–1917, 1918–1933
Archie Cameron	Country	Wooroora	1927–1934
Reginald Carter	Country/Liberal ^{[2]}	Burra Burra	1927–1930
Edward Coles	Country/Liberal ^{[2]}	Flinders	1927–1930
Clement Collins	Labor	Murray	1924–1933
Hon Frederick Coneybeer	Liberal	East Torrens	1893–1921, 1924–1930
George Cooke	Labor	Barossa	1924–1933
Henry Crosby	Liberal	Barossa	1917–1924, 1924–1930, 1933–1938
Bill Denny	Labor	Adelaide	1900–1905, 1906–1933
Bert Edwards	Labor	Adelaide	1917–1931
John Fitzgerald	Labor	Port Pirie	1918–1936
Herbert George	Labor	Adelaide	1926–1933
Edward Giles	Liberal	Yorke Peninsula	1926–1933
Walter Hamilton	Liberal	East Torrens	1917–1924, 1925–1930, 1933–1938
Ernest Hannaford	Liberal	Murray	1927–1930
William Harvey	Labor	Newcastle	1918–1933
Percy Heggaton	Liberal	Alexandra	1906–1915, 1923–1938
Lionel Hill	Labor	Port Pirie	1915–1917, 1918–1933
Hon Hermann Homburg	Liberal	Murray	1906–1915, 1927–1930
Herbert Hudd	Liberal	Alexandra	1912–1915, 1920–1938, 1941–1948
Shirley Jeffries	Liberal	North Adelaide	1927–1930, 1933–1944, 1947–1953
George Jenkins	Liberal	Burra Burra	1918–1924, 1927–1930, 1933–1956
Francis Jettner	Liberal	Burra Burra	1927–1930
John Jonas	Labor	Port Adelaide	1927–1933
Hon George Laffer	Liberal	Alexandra	1913–1933
John Lyons	Liberal	Stanley	1926–1948
John McInnes	Labor	West Torrens	1918–1950
Malcolm McIntosh	Country/Liberal ^{[2]}	Albert	1921–1959
James McLachlan ^{[2]}	Liberal	Wooroora	1918–1930
Frederick McMillan	Country/Liberal ^{[2]}	Albert	1921–1933
James Moseley	Liberal	Flinders	1910–1933
Robert Nicholls	Liberal	Stanley	1915–1956
John Pedler	Labor	Wallaroo	1918–1938
Peter Reidy	Liberal	Victoria	1915–1932
Herbert Richards	Liberal	Sturt	1921–1930
Robert Richards	Labor	Wallaroo	1918–1949
Eric Shepherd	Labor	Victoria	1924–1933
Albert Sutton	Liberal	East Torrens	1927–1930
Thomas Thompson ^{[1]}	Independent Protestant Labor	Port Adelaide	1927, 1927–1930
Henry Tossell	Liberal	Yorke Peninsula	1915–1930
Edward Vardon	Liberal	Sturt	1918–1921, 1924–1930

^{1} Port Adelaide Independent Labor MHA Thomas Thompson was unseated on 30 May 1927, after a challenge from defeated Labor MHA Frank Condon over a defamatory pamphlet. Thompson contested and won the resulting by-election on 2 July.
^{2} In February 1928, four members of the Country Party, Reginald Carter (Burra Burra), Edward Coles (Flinders) and Malcolm McIntosh and Frederick McMillan (Albert), resigned from the party and joined the Liberal Federation following the breakdown of amalgamation talks.
^{3} Wooroora Liberal MHA James McLachlan resigned on 31 January 1930. No by-election was held due to the proximity of the 1930 state election.
