= Members of the South Australian Legislative Council, 1930–1933 =

This is a list of members of the South Australian Legislative Council from 1930 to 1933.

Name	District	Party	Term expiry	Time in office
Joseph Anderson ^{[2]}	Central No. 1	Independent	1938	1931–1944
Percy Blesing	Northern	Country Party/LCL ^{[4]}	1933	1924–1949
Frank Condon	Central No. 1	Labor	1938	1928–1961
John Herbert Cooke	Central No. 2	Liberal Federation/LCL ^{[4]}	1933	1915–1933
John Cowan	Southern	Liberal Federation/LCL ^{[4]}	1938	1910–1944
Walter Gordon Duncan	Midland	Liberal Federation/LCL ^{[4]}	1938	1918–1962
Tom Gluyas ^{[2]}	Central No. 1	Labor	1938	1918–1931
Sir David Gordon	Midland	Liberal Federation/LCL ^{[4]}	1938	1913–1944
Walter Hannaford	Midland	Liberal Federation/LCL ^{[4]}	1933	1912–1941
William Humphrey Harvey	Central No. 2	Liberal Federation/LCL ^{[4]}	1938	1915–1935
James Jelley	Central No. 1	Labor/PLP ^{[1]}	1933	1912–1933
Thomas McCallum	Southern	Liberal Federation/LCL ^{[4]}	1933	1920–1938
William George Mills	Northern	Country Party/LCL ^{[4]}	1933	1918–1933
William Morrow	Northern	Liberal Federation/LCL ^{[4]}	1938	1915–1934
Reuben Cranstoun Mowbray ^{[3]}	Southern	LCL	1938	1932–1938
Thomas Pascoe	Midland	Liberal Federation/LCL ^{[4]}	1933	1900–1933
George Henry Prosser	Central No. 2	Liberal Federation/LCL ^{[4]}	1933	1921–1933
George Ritchie	Northern	Liberal Federation/LCL ^{[4]}	1938	1924–1944
Sir Lancelot Stirling ^{[3]}	Southern	Liberal Federation/LCL ^{[4]}	1938	1891–1932
Henry Tassie	Central No. 2	Liberal Federation/LCL ^{[4]}	1938	1918–1938
Stanley Whitford	Central No. 1	Labor/PLP ^{[1]}	1933	1929–1941
Harry Dove Young	Southern	Liberal Federation/LCL ^{[4]}	1933	1927–1941

^{1} The Australian Labor Party split in August 1931 over the Cabinet's support for the Premiers' Plan as a response to the Great Depression. The state conference of the party expelled all 23 Labor MPs who had voted for the plan, including two of their four MLCs - James Jelley and Stanley Whitford. Jelley and Whitford both joined their expelled House of Assembly colleagues in forming the separate Parliamentary Labor Party. The two remaining MLCs, Frank Condon and Tom Gluyas, remained in the official Labor Party.
^{2} Labor MLC Tom Gluyas died on 3 September 1931. Independent candidate Joseph Anderson won the resulting by-election on 24 October.
^{3} LCL MLC Sir Lancelot Stirling died on 24 May 1932. Reuben Cranstoun Mowbray was elected unopposed to the vacancy on 17 June.
^{4} The two conservative parties, the Liberal Federation and the state branch of the Country Party, merged to create the new Liberal and Country League on 9 June 1932.
