= Members of the South Australian Legislative Council, 1927–1930 =

This is a list of members of the South Australian Legislative Council from 1927 to 1930

Name	District	Party	Term expiry	Time in office
Percy Blesing	Northern	Country	1933	1924–1949
John Carr ^{[2]}	Central No. 1	Labor	1933	1915–1929
Frank Condon ^{[1]}	Central No. 1	Labor	1930	1928–1961
John Herbert Cooke	Central No. 2	Liberal	1933	1915–1933
John Cowan	Southern	Liberal	1930	1910–1944
Walter Gordon Duncan	Midland	Liberal	1930	1918–1962
Tom Gluyas	Central No. 1	Labor	1930	1918–1931
Sir David Gordon	Midland	Liberal	1930	1913–1944
Walter Hannaford	Midland	Liberal	1933	1912–1941
William Humphrey Harvey	Central No. 2	Liberal	1930	1915–1935
James Jelley	Central No. 1	Labor	1933	1912–1933
Andrew Kirkpatrick ^{[1]}	Central No. 1	Labor	1930	1891–1897, 1900–1909, 1918–1928
Thomas McCallum	Southern	Liberal	1933	1920–1938
William George Mills	Northern	Country Party	1933	1918–1933
William Morrow	Northern	Liberal	1930	1915–1934
Thomas Pascoe	Midland	Liberal	1933	1900–1933
George Henry Prosser	Central No. 2	Liberal	1933	1921–1933
George Ritchie	Northern	Liberal	1930	1924–1944
Sir Lancelot Stirling	Southern	Liberal	1930	1891–1932
Henry Tassie	Central No. 2	Liberal	1930	1918–1938
Stanley Whitford ^{[2]}	Central No. 1	Labor	1933	1929–1941
Harry Dove Young	Southern	Liberal	1933	1927–1941

^{1} Labor MLC Andrew Kirkpatrick died on 19 August 1928. Frank Condon won the resulting by-election on 27 October.
^{2} Labor MLC John Carr died on 6 June 1929. Stanley Whitford won the resulting by-election on 17 August. Whitford was elected as an unendorsed Labor candidate after the party declared the initial preselection ballot void and did not endorse a candidate in the safe Labor seat; upon taking his seat, he sat with the Labor Party.
