= Members of the South Australian Legislative Council, 1924–1927 =

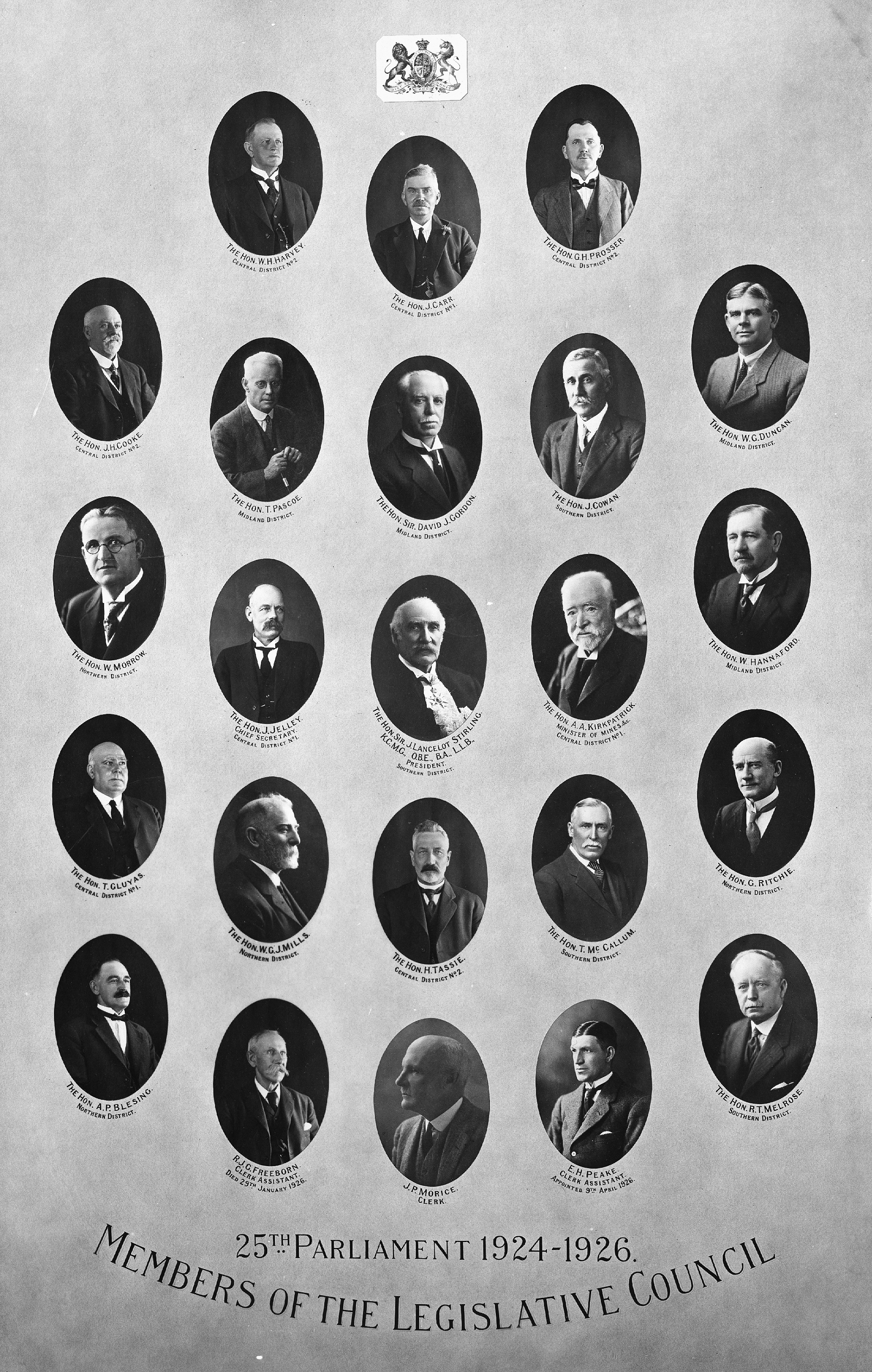
Montage of Members taken in 1925

This is a list of members of the South Australian Legislative Council from 1924 to 1927

Name	District	Party	Term expiry	Time in office
Percy Blesing^{[1]}	Northern	Country Party	1927	1924–1949
John Carr	Central No. 1	Labor	1927	1915–1929
John Herbert Cooke	Central No. 2	Liberal	1927	1915–1933
John Cowan	Southern	Liberal	1930	1910–1944
Walter Gordon Duncan	Midland	Liberal	1930	1918–1962
Tom Gluyas	Central No. 1	Labor	1930	1918–1931
David Gordon	Midland	Liberal	1930	1913–1944
Walter Hannaford	Midland	Liberal	1927	1912–1941
William Humphrey Harvey	Central No. 2	Liberal	1930	1915–1935
James Jelley	Central No. 1	Labor	1927	1912–1933
Andrew Kirkpatrick	Central No. 1	Labor	1930	1891–1897, 1900–1909, 1918–1928
Thomas McCallum	Southern	Liberal	1927	1920–1938
Robert Thomson Melrose	Southern	Liberal	1927	1921–1927
William George Mills^{[1]}	Northern	Country Party	1927	1918–1933
William Morrow	Northern	Liberal	1930	1915–1934
Thomas Pascoe	Midland	Liberal	1927	1900–1933
George Henry Prosser	Central No. 2	Liberal	1927	1921–1933
George Ritchie	Northern	Liberal	1930	1924–1944
Sir Lancelot Stirling	Southern	Liberal	1930	1891–1932
Henry Tassie	Central No. 2	Liberal	1930	1918–1938

^{1} The two MLCs for Northern District in the previous parliament whose terms were not due to expire until 1927, Sir John George Bice and John Lewis, both of the Liberal Federation, had both died in the second half of 1923. Their seats were filled simultaneously with the 1924 elections for the other class of seats, with four members instead of the usual two being elected, and the third and fourth-placed candidates, William George Mills and Percy Blesing, being elected for a half-term.
