= Electoral results for the district of Albert (South Australia) =

Election results for Albert, South Australia

This is a list of election results for the electoral district of Albert in South Australian elections.

== Members for Albert ==
First incarnation (1875–1902)
Member	Party	Term	Member	Party	Term
Arthur Hardy		1875–1887	Mountifort Conner		1875–1875
Arthur Hardy		1875–1887	William Wigley		1875–1878
Arthur Hardy		1875–1887	Rudolph Henning		1878–1885
Arthur Hardy		1875–1887	Andrew Handyside		1885–1891
Beaumont Moulden		1887–1890	Andrew Handyside		1885–1891
George Ash		1890–1891	Andrew Handyside		1885–1891
George Ash	Defence League	1891–1896	Andrew Handyside	Defence League	1891–1896
Archibald Peake		1897–1902	Andrew Handyside		1897–1902
Second incarnation (1915–1938)
Member	Party	Term	Member	Party	Term
William Angus	Liberal Union	1915–1921	Richard O'Connor	Liberal Union	1915–1921
Malcolm McIntosh	Country	1921–1928	Frederick McMillan	Country	1921–1928
Malcolm McIntosh	Liberal Federation	1928–1932	Frederick McMillan	Liberal Federation	1928–1932
Malcolm McIntosh	Liberal and Country	1932–1938	Frederick McMillan	Liberal and Country	1932–1933
Malcolm McIntosh	Liberal and Country	1932–1938	Tom Stott	Independent	1933–1938

Single-member (1938–1970)
Member	Party	Term
Malcolm McIntosh	Liberal and Country	1938–1959
Bill Nankivell	Liberal and Country	1959–1970

== Election results ==
=== Elections in the 1960s ===
1968 South Australian state election: Albert
Party	Candidate	Votes	%	±%
Liberal and Country	Bill Nankivell	5,872	76.7	−23.3
Labor	Graham Maguire	1,783	23.3	+23.3
Total formal votes		7,655	98.4	
Informal votes		125	1.7	
Turnout		7,780	95.4	
Liberal and Country hold		Swing	N/A	

1965 South Australian state election: Albert
Party	Candidate	Votes	%	±%
Liberal and Country	Bill Nankivell	unopposed		
Liberal and Country hold		Swing		

1962 South Australian state election: Albert
Party	Candidate	Votes	%	±%
Liberal and Country	Bill Nankivell	unopposed		
Liberal and Country hold		Swing		

=== Elections in the 1950s ===
1959 South Australian state election: Albert
Party	Candidate	Votes	%	±%
Liberal and Country	Bill Nankivell	unopposed		
Liberal and Country hold		Swing		

1956 South Australian state election: Albert
Party	Candidate	Votes	%	±%
Liberal and Country	Malcolm McIntosh	unopposed		
Liberal and Country hold		Swing		

1953 South Australian state election: Albert
Party	Candidate	Votes	%	±%
Liberal and Country	Malcolm McIntosh	4,225	74.6	−25.4
Independent	Robert Upton	999	17.7	+17.7
Independent	Carl Muller	436	7.7	+7.7
Total formal votes		5,660	96.6	
Informal votes		200	3.4	
Turnout		5,860	95.7	
Liberal and Country hold		Swing	N/A	

- Preferences were not distributed.

1950 South Australian state election: Albert
Party	Candidate	Votes	%	±%
Liberal and Country	Malcolm McIntosh	unopposed		
Liberal and Country hold		Swing		

=== Elections in the 1940s ===
1947 South Australian state election: Albert
Party	Candidate	Votes	%	±%
Liberal and Country	Malcolm McIntosh	unopposed		
Liberal and Country hold		Swing		

1944 South Australian state election: Albert
Party	Candidate	Votes	%	±%
Liberal and Country	Malcolm McIntosh	3,078	66.4	+4.2
Independent	J P Ryan	1,025	22.1	+22.1
Labor	John Cronin	531	11.5	+11.5
Total formal votes		4,634	97.8	−0.6
Informal votes		102	2.2	+0.6
Turnout		4,736	88.3	+27.8
Liberal and Country hold		Swing	N/A	

- Preferences were not distributed.

1941 South Australian state election: Albert
Party	Candidate	Votes	%	±%
Liberal and Country	Malcolm McIntosh	2,059	62.2	+7.6
Independent	Alfred Parker	664	20.1	+20.1
Independent	John Cronin	588	17.8	+17.8
Total formal votes		3,311	98.4	−0.2
Informal votes		54	1.6	+0.2
Turnout		3,365	60.5	−11.4
Liberal and Country hold		Swing	N/A	

- Preferences were not distributed.

=== Elections in the 1930s ===
1938 South Australian state election: Albert
Party	Candidate	Votes	%	±%
Liberal and Country	Malcolm McIntosh	2,146	54.6	
Independent	Gwynfred Oram	1,237	31.5	
Independent	John McNamara	549	14.0	
Total formal votes		3,932	98.6	
Informal votes		57	1.4	
Turnout		3,989	71.9	
Liberal and Country hold		Swing	N/A	

- Preferences were not distributed.
