= John Stanley Verran =

Australian politician (1883–1952)

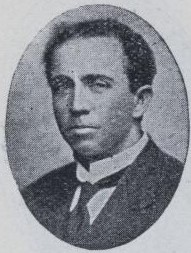

John Stanley Verran (24 December 1883 – 30 August 1952) was an Australian politician.

Verran was born in Moonta, the son of John Verran, later Premier of South Australia. He went to work in a mine at the age of 11, and later worked as a clerk in Port Adelaide. He was involved in the formation of the Federated Clerks' Union, and served as president of the Australian Government Workers Association.

In 1918, he was elected to the South Australian House of Assembly as a Labor member for Port Adelaide, at the same election as his father was defeated standing for the splinter National Party. In 1924, he was selected by the party's general plebiscite as one of fifteen Labor candidates for the metropolitan area at the forthcoming election, but was defeated by Frank Condon by one vote in a Port Adelaide electorate committee vote for which two candidates would contest Port Adelaide. He was subsequently chosen to contest the more difficult seat of Sturt and lost.

In 1925, the second Port Adelaide MP, John Price, resigned from parliament when he was appointed Agent-General for South Australia. Verran was selected by general plebiscite as the Labor candidate in the resulting by-election, which he won, returning to parliament. A subsequent change in party rules saw electorate committees given the power to determine their own candidates, and in August 1926 Verran lost Labor preselection for the 1927 election to John Jonas. He retired at the election, but tensions around his pre-selection defeat were touted as one of the reasons behind Condon's defeat by independent Protestant Labor Party candidate Thomas Thompson at that election.

Parliament of South Australia
Preceded by Ivor MacGillivray	Member for Port Adelaide; 1918–1924	Succeeded by Frank Condon
Preceded by John Price	Member for Port Adelaide; 1925–1927	Succeeded by John Jonas
