= Thomas Hawke =

Australian politician

Thomas Hawke (1 August 1873 – 27 June 1958) was an Australian politician who represented the South Australian House of Assembly multi-member seat of Burra Burra from 1921 to 1924 for the Country Party.
