= Richard Alfred O'Connor =

Australian politician

Member of the South Australian Parliament for Albert
- In office 27 March 1915 – 9 April 1921

Personal details
- Born: 18 September 1880 Adelaide, South Australia
- Died: 3 March 1941 (aged 60) North Adelaide, South Australia
- Party: Liberal Union

Richard Alfred O'Connor (18 September 1880 – 3 March 1941) was an Australian politician. He was a Liberal Union member of the South Australian House of Assembly from 1915 to 1921, representing the multi-member seat of Albert.

== Early life and career ==
O'Connor was born at Cradock and educated at Christian Brothers' College, but was raised at Hawker, where he was the son of the local storekeeper. He continued the family business (P. O'Connor & Son) for several years upon the death of his father. He was secretary of the Hawker Vigilance Committee, treasurer of the Hawker Gymnasium Club, a member of the Hawker Institute Committee and a regular lap steward for local horseracing. The Hawker business was sold in 1907, at which time O'Connor relocated to Lameroo and began operating the general store there. He was made a justice of the peace in 1908. In 1909, he disposed of the Lameroo store to Eudunda Farmers Ltd and went into partnership as an auctioneer and land agent in the firm of McNamara and O'Connor until 1912. By 1914, he was reported as living in Adelaide and working as a land agent there, though he retained ownership of farms in the district and continued to be involved in local causes. He was the first clerk of the District Council of Lameroo, the first president of the Lameroo Agricultural Society, secretary of the Lameroo Jockey Club and president of the Lameroo Football Club, the Hospital Board of Management, the Lameroo Institute committee and the School Board of Advice.

== State politics ==
O'Connor was elected to the House of Assembly at the 1915 state election for the conservative rural Albert electorate. O'Connor immediately found himself pressured to resign, as the Liberal leader Archibald Peake had lost his seat at the election and the party wished to find another seat for him; however, this did not occur, and instead O'Connor was appointed secretary of the parliamentary party. In 1916, while a serving MP, he became a director of the Eudunda Farmers Co-operative Society.

In July 1917, the Labor government collapsed due to defecting MPs in the fallout from the 1916 Labor split and Peake was installed as Premier. O'Connor had been tipped to be Commissioner of Crown Lands in the new government, but instead resigned his secretary role and withdrew from the Liberal caucus, endangering the new government's slim majority. It was reported at the time, and confirmed by O'Connor, that he was unhappy with the treatment of the Labor defectors and argued that a National Government should have been formed, as had occurred federally, and he later strongly argued that the Liberal Union and the defectors' new National Party should not contest each other's seats at the 1918 election. However, in February 1918 he partly repudiated his initial explanation for his resignation, stating that he believed the Liberal Union should have been dominant in any union with the defectors and that his withdrawal had been because, he claimed, colleague Harry Dove Young had threatened to quit the party if he were promoted to the ministry and he had been outraged at Young's alleged move. O'Connor was supported by his local branch during the dispute, and later rejoined caucus.

He was re-elected as a Liberal Union candidate at the 1918 election, at which the Liberal and National parties had a non-aggression pact as O'Connor had sought. He had been involved in negotiations to do the same with the Farmers and Settlers' Association, but the FSA unsuccessfully ran candidates against him In April 1920, he was again touted as a likely candidate for promotion to Commissioner of Crown Lands when Peake's death necessitated a ministerial reshuffle, but this did not occur; O'Connor later said that he was offered the role but had to decline due to his business interests. In December 1920, he announced that he would not contest the 1921 election as a Liberal and had not decided whether he would stand at all, advocating that the non-Labor parties put their differences aside and form a united front; he reaffirmed that he continued to support government policy. In January 1921 it was reported that he would contest for the new "Progressive Country Party" – a short-lived union of the National Party with several former Liberals, but he subsequently denied this and instead recontested for the Liberal Union after all. He was defeated by FSA candidate Frederick McMillan by two votes at the election. He appealed the result in the Court of Disputed Returns, alleging irregularities in the conduct of the election, but withdrew the petition three months later before it had been heard.

== Post-politics ==
After his defeat, he continued as manager of the stock department of the S.A. Farmers Co-operative Union Ltd, a role which he had begun c. 1916 while a serving MP. He resigned from the organisation in 1924 to enter business on his own behalf, later describing his employment as a secretary. He was the campaign director for Country Party Senator Victor Wilson at the 1925 federal election. In June 1926, following his prominent role in the Senate campaign, he announced that he would reject overtures to run at the next election, retire from politics and would join the firm of Coles Brothers Ltd., managing their real estate branch, later forming his own short-lived partnership of O'Connor, Alexander and Flecker in 1931–32, which ended acrimoniously amid legal action. He came out of political retirement in 1930, making an unsuccessful bid for the Legislative Council as a Country Party candidate. In 1935, he formed and became organising secretary of the fiscally conservative Taxpayers' Welfare Association.

He died at North Adelaide on 3 March 1941.

Parliament of South Australia
New seat	Member for Albert; 1915–1921; Served alongside: William Angus	Succeeded by Malcolm McIntosh; Frederick McMillan
