= John Godfree =

Australian politician

John Francis Godfree (16 May 1868 – 30 January 1958) was an Australian politician who represented the South Australian House of Assembly multi-member seat of Murray from 1921 to 1924 for the Liberal Union and the Liberal Federation.
