= John Jonas (politician) =

Australian politician

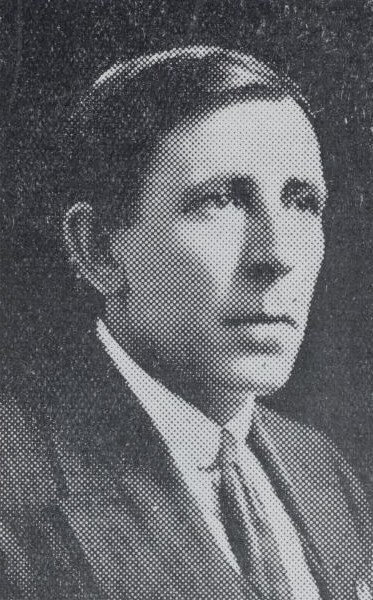

John Frederick Drummond (Jack) Jonas (circa 1881 – 2 July 1938) was an Australian politician. He represented the South Australian House of Assembly multi-member seat of Port Adelaide from 1927 to 1933 for the Labor Party.

Jonas was born in Port Adelaide, the son of publican Robert Jonas. His father operated the Sussex and Princess Hotels in Port Adelaide and the Exmouth Hotel at Exeter; John was born in the Sussex Hotel. He was educated at the Lefevre Peninsula school before leaving to work in the jarrah forests, on a cattle station and in gold prospecting at Broken Hill and in Western Australia. Jonas later returned to Port Adelaide for health reasons, and worked as a storeman with Gamblings Limited and other stores in Port Adelaide. He was secretary of the local electorate committee of the Australian Labor Party, the Port Adelaide Trades and Labor Council, and the Port Adelaide Storemen and Packers' Union. He was elected assistant state secretary of the Storemen and Packers' Union in 1924, and state secretary in 1925, serving in that role until 1931. In the community, Jonas chaired the Port Adelaide Hospital Committee and the local branch of the District Trained Nursing Society, and served on the committee of the Port Adelaide Workers' Memorial.

In 1926, Jonas successfully challenged incumbent Labor MP John Stanley Verran for Labor preselection for his safe Port Adelaide House of Assembly seat at the 1927 state election. Jonas had previously been touted for Labor preselection for a 1925 by-election which had been won by Verran. Jonas won the election, and continued as secretary of the Storemen and Packers' Union in tandem with his parliamentary duties. He was re-elected as state MP for Port Adelaide in 1930, but lost a bid for the Port Adelaide City Council later that year. Jonas was one of only six Labor MPs not to be expelled from the party in the 1931 split over the Premiers' Plan, having sided with the party apparatus over the Labor Cabinet in opposing it. Despite this, he was soundly defeated contesting official Labor preselection for the 1933 election, finishing fifth in a contest for the two available seats. He did not contest the 1933 election.

After leaving politics, he took over the District Hotel at Gumeracha and then was licensee of the Sevenhill Hotel at Sevenhill. He had shifted back to Adelaide and opened a business in Torrensville a few months before his sudden death in 1938.

Parliament of South Australia
Preceded by John Stanley Verran	Member for Port Adelaide; 1927–1933; Served alongside: T. Thompson, A. Thompson	Succeeded by James Stephens
