= Edward Coles (Australian politician) =

Australian politician

Edward Coles (23 November 1874 – 16 October 1945) was an Australian politician who represented the South Australian House of Assembly multi-member seat of Flinders from 1927 to 1930. He was elected for the Country Party, but resigned to join the larger Liberal Federation in February 1928 after the failure of amalgamation talks between the parties.

Parliament of South Australia
Preceded by John O'Connor	Member for Flinders; 1927–1930; Served alongside: James Moseley	Succeeded by Edward Craigie
