= John Randell =

Australian politician

John Beavis Randell (8 January 1877 – 19 March 1953) was an Australian politician who represented the South Australian House of Assembly multi-member seat of Murray from 1921 to 1924 for the Liberal Union and the Liberal Federation.
