= Even George =

Australian politician (1875–1969)

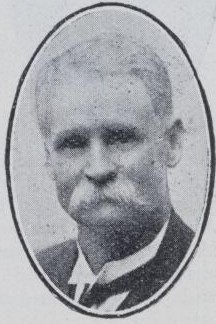

Even Ernest George (1 February 1875 – 1 June 1969) was an Australian politician. He was the Labor member for Burra Burra in the South Australian House of Assembly from 1930 to 1933.

George was born at Quorn and educated locally, the son of a farmer who died when he was twelve. His first job was in an office in Port Augusta, after which he spent time working at Wallaroo Mines, where he was involved in the union movement. He also spent three years on the Western Australian goldfields and two years in the pastoral areas of Queensland. However, he was a farmer for the most of his life, and by the 1920s, he had his own farm at North Booborowie. He was auditor of the District Council of Spalding, chairman of the local school committee, a member of the Spalding Repatriation Committee, president of the North Booborowie and Spalding local Labor committees and president of Labor's Burra Burra electorate committee. He was an unsuccessful Labor candidate for the House of Assembly in 1921 and the Legislative Council in 1924.

George was elected to the House of Assembly at the 1930 election. He was expelled from the Labor Party in the 1931 Labor split, along with the entire Cabinet, for voting in support of the Premiers' Plan, and joined the splinter Parliamentary Labor Party. He was a member of the select committee dealing with the insolvency of wheat firm Verco Bros and was the Assembly representative on the Farmers' Assistance Board. He contested the 1933 election for the PLP, but was defeated. He was readmitted to the Labor Party following the resolution of the split, but resigned in 1937 in protest at preselection rules and contested the 1938 election as an independent. He later rejoined the party and unsuccessfully contested his old seat for Labor at the 1950 election.

His brother, Herbert George, was also a Labor MP in South Australia.
