= Edward Giles (Australian politician) =

Australian politician

Edward Hollingworth Giles (5 April 1882 – 21 July 1946) was an Australian politician who represented the South Australian House of Assembly seat of Yorke Peninsula from 1926 to 1933 for the Liberal Federation and the Liberal and Country League.

Giles had been a farmer at Yorketown. He had been selected as clerk of the District Council of Melville at 19 and held the role for 18 years, after which he became council chairman.
