= William Angus (Australian politician) =

Scottish-born Australian politician and farmer

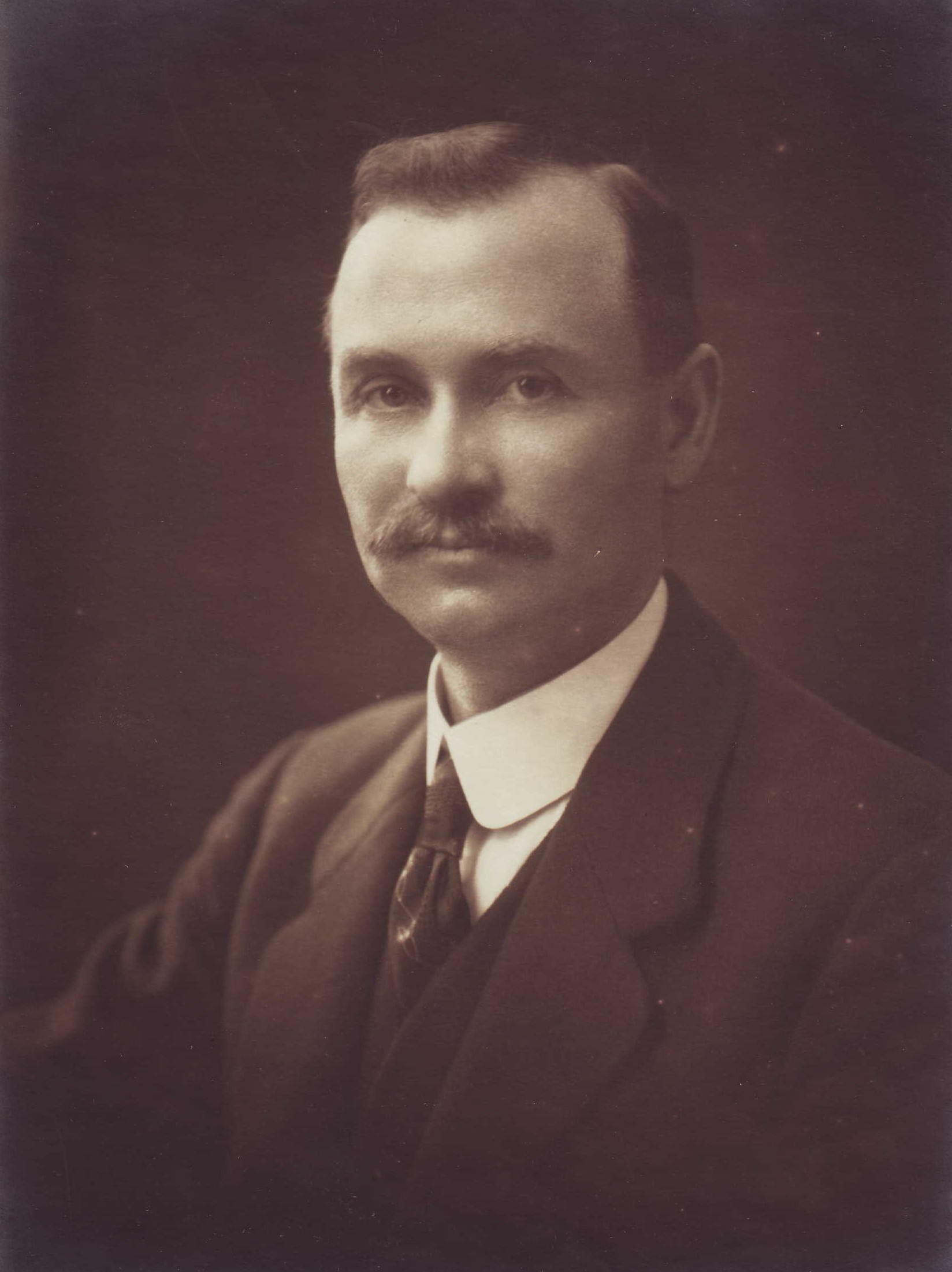

William Angus (4 June 1871 – 15 May 1965) was a Scottish-born Australian politician and farmer.

Angus was born in Keithhall, Aberdeenshire, Scotland and was educated at the University of Aberdeen, gaining a B.Sc. (Agriculture) in 1900. He arrived in South Australia in 1904 and became professor (later director) of agriculture and secretary to the minister of agriculture. After a year of farming, Angus was elected to the South Australian House of Assembly as member for Victoria and Albert from February 1912 to May 1915 and as member for Albert May 1915 to April 1921. Angus was chairman of committees in 1920 and secretary of the parliamentary Liberal Party.

Parliament of South Australia
Preceded by Donald Campbell; William Senior	Member for Victoria and Albert; 1912–1915; Served alongside: George Bodey, Archibald Peake	Seat abolished
New seat	Member for Albert; 1915–1921; Served alongside: Richard Alfred O'Connor	Succeeded by Malcolm McIntosh; Frederick McMillan
