= Percy Blesing =

Australian politician

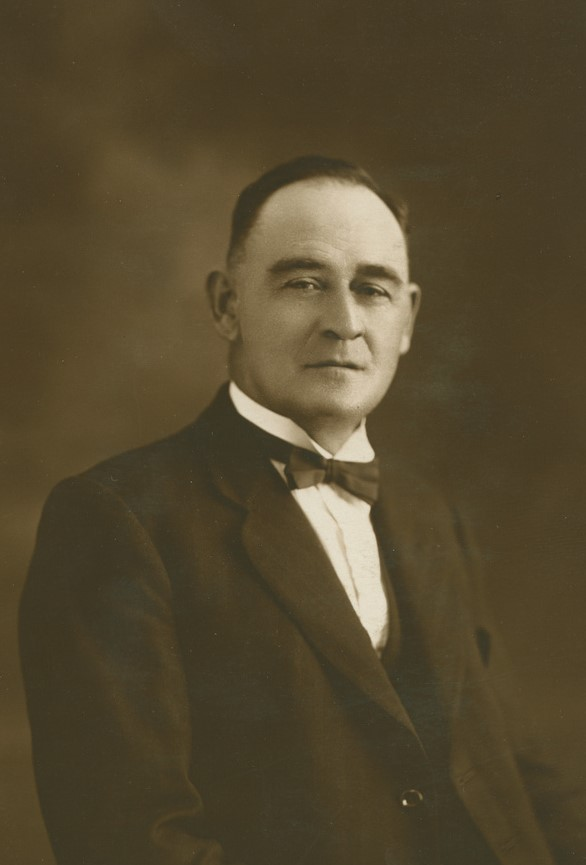

Albert Percy Blesing (9 September 1879 – 2 March 1949) was a farmer and politician from South Australia who served as Minister for Agriculture (1933–1944), for Local Government (1933–1938) and for Afforestation (1938–1944). He was a founding member of the Country Party in South Australia and served in the governments of Richard Layton Butler and Thomas Playford IV.

Percy Blesing was born in Hamilton, South Australia to Ernst Gotthilf Blesing and his wife Elizabeth (née Flower). Percy's grandparents had emigrated from Germany in 1841 and his family settled in the northern farming areas of South Australia. In 1893, Percy's family moved to Glenholme, a 1400ha mixed farm at Bangor in the lower Flinders Ranges. After several years working as a farmhand and shearer around Australia and in New Zealand, Percy married Eliza Muriel Annie Glasson and took over Glenholme. Percy and Annie had five children, Ida, Gwen, Lloyd, Ned, and Jabez. Jabez died of whooping cough at a young age.

== Political career ==
Percy soon became involved in politics, being a founding member of the Country Party in South Australia and being elected to the South Australian Legislative Council for the Northern District in 1924, a seat he would hold for the rest of his life. The family moved to Prospect in the northern suburbs of Adelaide. Percy was involved in the defeat of the James Scullin government in 1931 and, with fellow South Australian Archie Cameron, negotiated the formation of the Liberal and Country League in South Australia. As part of the final agreement in the formation of the LCL, Blesing was promised a cabinet post in any future LCL government. Richard Layton Butler led the LCL to power in 1933, and per the agreement, Blesing was appointed Minister for Agriculture and Local Government.

As a farmer, Blesing was an effective local representative and a strong advocate for rural issues. He served on the board of the South Australian Voluntary Wheat Pools Ltd and on the advisory committee to the State Bank of South Australia. Despite his achievements in overseeing rural rehabilitation, expansions in agricultural education and industry, road improvements and pine plantations, Blesing came into conflict with other members of his coalition. A jovial, good-natured man, Blesing enjoyed a day at the races more than reading his departmental briefs. He had little time for political conniving and his enthusiasms lead him to be nicknamed the "Minister for Billiards". Not all of his colleagues disapproved, however, at least in private. Butler resigned as Premier in 1938 over a dispute over betting shop legislation and leadership was taken over by Thomas Playford IV. Tom Playford was a regular visitor to the Blesing household where he was able to indulge in activities frowned upon by his family and colleagues.

By 1944, however, Playford had lost patience with Blesing's gaffes and his frequent visits to Tattersalls. He asked for Blesing's resignation, and when Blesing refused, Playford simply submitted the resignation of his entire cabinet and appointed a new one, without Blesing. Blesing was devastated by Playford's political betrayal but, despite voting against him occasionally, never betrayed Playford's personal trust.

Blesing died following a gall bladder operation in 1949 and was buried at Wirrabara after a state funeral. He was survived by his wife, two daughters and two sons.
