= Henry Tassie =

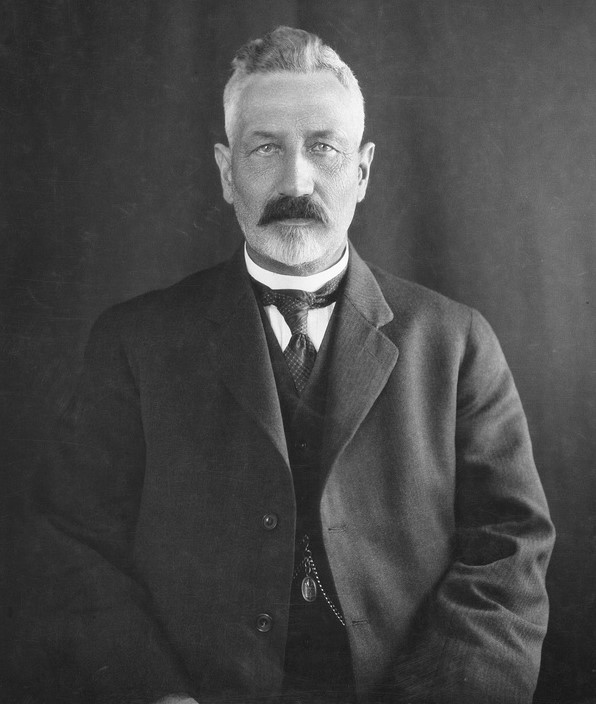

Henry Tassie (8 June 1863 – 26 October 1945) was an Australian politician. He was a member of the South Australian Legislative Council from 1918 to 1938, representing Central District No. 2 for three successive conservative parties: the Liberal Union, Liberal Federation and Liberal and Country League. He was Chief Secretary, Minister of Mines and Minister of Marine from 1927 to 1930 in the government of Richard Layton Butler.

== History ==
He was born in 1863, a son of Robert Stewart Tassie (ca.1831 – 1 January 1905) of South Terrace, Adelaide. His father had emigrated from Scotland in 1854.

Henry was educated at W. S. Moore's Pulteney Street School and there won a scholarship to St. Peter's College, Adelaide. He served for three years with the Adelaide firm of W. & J. Storrie, then with D. M. Peek of Balaklava. In 1895 he started with a firm of stockbrokers, then started on his own account in Gay's Arcade in a business which became Tassie, McKee and Tassie.

He was for several years auditor for Broken Hill Proprietary, and a director of Office Equippers Ltd. He was president of the Institute of Accountants of South Australia and the Australian National Federation. (Note: "Mr. H. Tassie Dies, Aged 83". The News. 26 October 1945. p. 3 – via Trove. The statement that Henry was Chief of the Caledonian Society is erroneous; that was his brother John Tassie, who held that position 1928–1930.)

== Politics ==
He was a councillor with Glenelg Council for several years and mayor 1924–1925.

He was elected a member of the Legislative Council for the Liberal Party in 1918, holding the seat until 1938, and was Chief Secretary and Minister for Mines from 1927 to 1930. He served as acting Premier on several occasions.

== Other interests ==
He was secretary and president of the Balaklava Institute. He was a member of the Caledonian Society and their Secretary 1902–1905 and again in 1927.

He was a longstanding member of the Methodist church, and a member of the Methodist Federal Council. He was a Rechabite.

== Family ==
He married Susan Dellow ( – 18 May 1945) on 13 October 1885; their children included:

- Arthur Cecil Tassie (1886 – 1916) killed in action 21 Sept 1916 in France. Fought with New Zealand Army's 2nd Battalion, Canterbury Regiment.
- Eric Harry Tassie (12 October 1887 – 21 July 1936), Australian rules football administrator; married Grace Helena Cranston on 14 November 1912.
- Priscilla Janet Tassie (1892 – )
- John Ford Tassie (1895 – 27 August 1970) died at Victor Harbor
- William Reginald Tassie (1899 – )
- Malcolm McLean "Mac" Tassie (29 April 1902 – 9 February 1922)
- (Ford) Constance Lily Tassie (1905 – ) married A. E. Shepherd
- Winnie Frances Bain Tassie (1908 – ) married G G Abbott

John Tassie (1855 – 8 August 1934), noted for his involvement with Minda Home, was a brother. A son John Tassie jun. was killed in France 25 April 1918.
