= John Herbert Cooke =

Australian politician

John Herbert Cooke (3 August 1867 – 30 July 1943) was an Australian politician, variably referred to as "J. Herbert Cooke" or "J. H. Cooke".

== History ==
He was born at Payneham, South Australia, the third son of Ebenezer Cooke (ca.1832 – 7 May 1907), Commissioner of Audit for South Australian, of "Richmond House", South Terrace, Adelaide and his second wife Rosa, née Phillipps (ca.1845 – 9 July 1941). He was educated at Frederick Caterer's Glenelg Grammar School, Norwood Commercial College and St. Peter's College, where he was Science Prizeman in 1883. He was employed at the Islington Railway Workshops, before becoming a consulting engineer and patent attorney.

== Politics ==
He contested the single statewide seven-member Division of South Australia at the 1901 federal election as a Free Trade Party candidate.

In South Australia, he was a councillor (Parkside ward) 1900–1904 and first mayor of the newly proclaimed City of Unley 1905–1907 (Mrs. Cooke laid the foundation stone of the new Town Hall in March 1907) then an alderman 1908–1914. He won the Central No. 2 seat on the Legislative Council in 1915 and remained an energetic member until 1933. In 1933, he lost preselection to Hermann Homburg and Collier Cudmore, and ran for Central No. 1 district as an independent. Though he performed creditably in a strong Labor district, he was unsuccessful. Unusually, he was permitted to continue using the honorific "Hon." after leaving parliament, on account of his long and meritorious service.

== Other interests ==
He was a director of the Cowells Patent Lock Company and the Bruer Pianoforte Company amongst others, and invested in startup companies of local inventors. He was a leading Freemason, president of the Soldiers' Home League, the School of Arts and Crafts and the Myrtle Bank Home and prominent in many other associations. His widow and daughter presented the Royal Geographical Society with a brass surveyor's level, made by Troughton & Simms, and reputedly used by Colonel William Light.

== Family ==
John Herbert Cooke married Harriet Williams on 15 December 1896. They had one daughter Doris and lived at 174 Cross Road, Malvern.
