= Francis Jettner =

Australian politician

Francis Theodore Jettner (c. 1869 – 29 May 1936) was an Australian politician who represented the South Australian House of Assembly multi-member seat of Burra Burra from 1927 to 1930 for the Liberal Federation.
