= John O'Connor (Australian politician) =

Australian politician

John O'Connor (20 October 1878 – 22 September 1937) was an Australian politician who represented the South Australian House of Assembly multi-member seat of Flinders from 1924 to 1927 for the Labor Party.

He was born and educated in Port Lincoln, and left school at twelve to work for a local farmer and grazier. He was a farmer and contractor at Tumby Bay prior to entering politics. He was a member of the Tumby Bay Hospital Board of Management and secretary of the Tumby Bay School Committee. He was elected to the Legislative Assembly at the 1924 election, but was defeated after one term at the 1927 election.

He later contested Flinders as an independent Labor candidate at the 1930 election after being barred from the Labor preselection due to a dispute about owed levies, but was defeated.

The Hundred of O'Connor cadastral division is named for him.

Parliament of South Australia
Preceded by John Chapman	Member for Flinders; 1924–1927; Served alongside: James Moseley	Succeeded by Edward Coles
