= Thomas Thompson (Australian politician) =

Australian politician

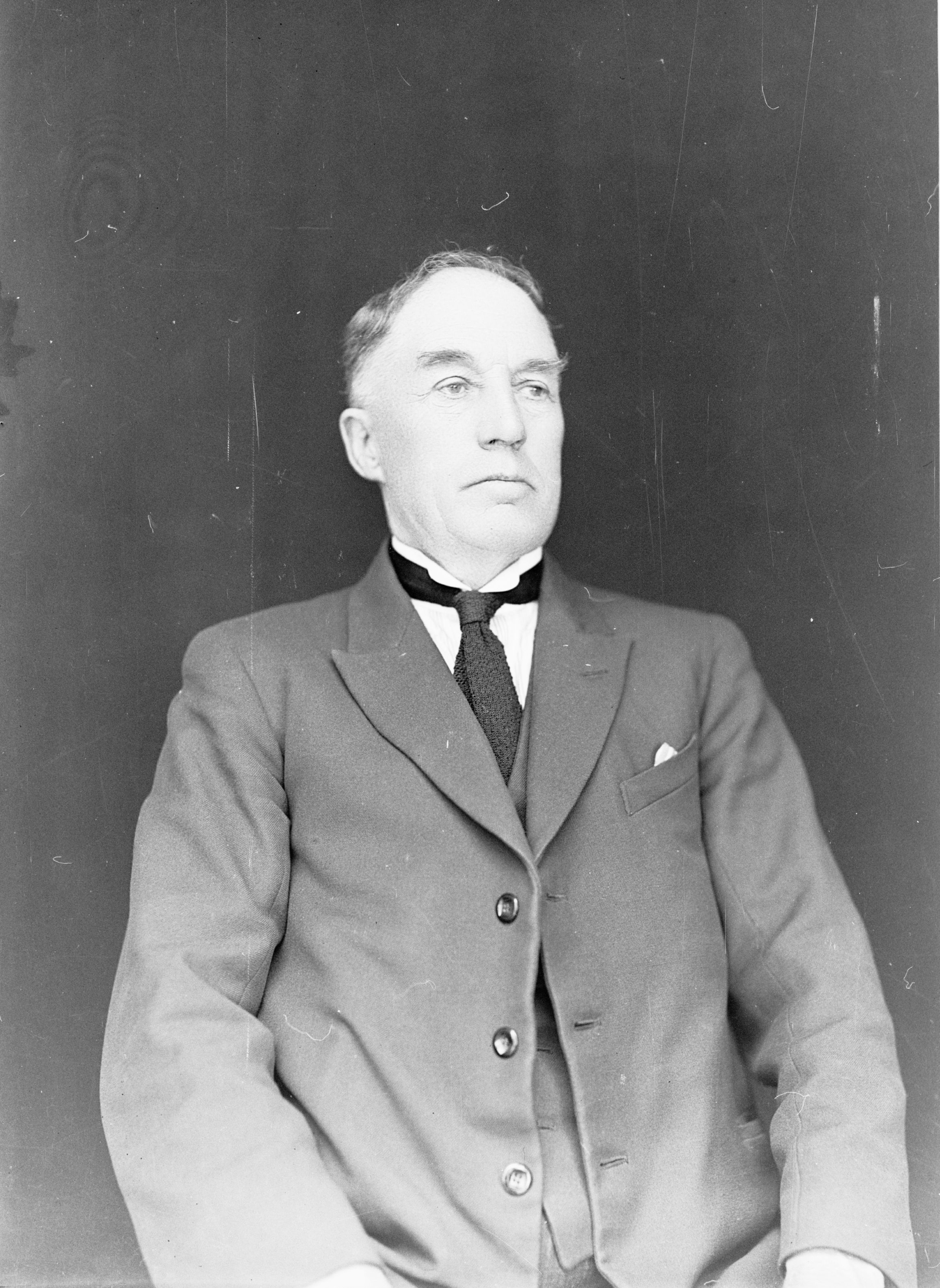
T. T. Thompson, 1929

Thomas Turner Thompson (11 July 1867 – 10 July 1947) was an Australian politician. He was a member of the South Australian House of Assembly from 1927 to 1930, one of the two members for the Port Adelaide seat. He was variously described as a Protestant Labor Party or Independent Labor MLC.

== Career ==
Thompson was born at Hindmarsh, the son of George and Jane Thompson, and was educated at the Grote Street Model School. He worked in the Broken Hill mines for a period, then became a butcher at Alberton, during which time he was vice-president and secretary of the Journeymen Butchers' Union of South Australia. He later became a wharf labourer at Port Adelaide, serving as the first president of the Port Adelaide Shoremen's Union, and years later as chairman of the local Waterside Workers' Federation branch from 1923 until his ouster by Oscar Oates in 1927. He was a prominent and popular figure in Port Adelaide union circles, although never a member of the Labor Party. Thompson also served as chairman of the Cheltenham Congregational Church and as chairman of the British Football Association.

== Initial election ==
In February 1927, he announced that he would contest the 1927 state election as a Protestant Labor candidate in the seat of Port Adelaide, opposing the two incumbent Labor MHAs. The WWF insisted that he withdraw his nomination, but Thompson refused; the union then publicly opposed his candidacy. Thompson's campaign denounced "Political Romanism", alleging that it was "disloyal to the Empire", supported scripture reading in state schools, favoured a referendum on alcohol, stated his personal support for Labor Premier Lionel Hill, advocated the construction of the Birkenhead Bridge as the most important local issue, and called for the Harbours Board to be replaced with a Harbour Trust, opposed immigration, and suggested limiting public employment to "native-born or nationalised British subjects".

He won the election in an upset result, defeating Frank Condon. He attributed a large part of his victory to the support of the Protestant Federation. He immediately announced upon the declaration of the poll that "the Labor Party could rely on him". Following his victory, he was formally expelled by the WWF in May.

== Court challenge and re-election ==
In early May 1927, Condon initiated both court proceedings against Thompson's campaign manager and a petition against the election result, alleging that the campaign had circulated a defamatory pamphlet during the campaign. The pamphlet had targeted Condon's holding of both a union secretary and an MP role as well as his past holding of various honorary positions, "one man one job" being a disputed union issue at that time. Condon claimed that it portrayed him as "mercenary" and "avaricious" and as having gained as many honorary positions as he could to obtain paid work and then discarding them. Condon won both cases; the campaign secretary was fined £10 on 23 May, and Thompson's election victory was voided by the Court of Disputed Returns on 30 May.

The decision resulted in a by-election to be held on 2 July 1927, with Condon and Thompson the only candidates. Thompson complained of "persecution" following his general election candidacy, stating that he had been prevented from working on the docks, had been ejected from the union, and had his name chiselled off a plaque at the union hall. Walter Skelton, the only Protestant Labor MP in the Parliament of New South Wales, travelled to South Australia to assist in the by-election campaign. Thompson was comfortably re-elected at the by-election after a bitter campaign, increasing his margin from 187 to 5,059 votes.

Thompson voted against a Labor no-confidence motion in the new Liberal Federation government over the dismissal of 2,000 public employees and told striking timber workers they should return to work after a disagreeable award outcome. He strongly opposed any "dole" scheme for unemployed workers, suggesting potential public works projects to create jobs instead and advocating the "one man one job" principle to free up positions. Thompson called for an overhaul of Labor Bureau policies, especially with regard to Depression ration relief, and was successful in decentralising the system and allowing local businesses to meet demand through a coupon system. He attacked perceived Communist influence on the Port Adelaide docks, claiming that "money supplied from Russian Bolshevist sources" was being used for propaganda. Thompson supported Labor leader Hill in his opposition to supporters of NSW Premier Jack Lang. He advocated for Port Adelaide locals to be given preference for jobs over those who had migrated to the district from elsewhere. He enthusiastically supported a proposal to cut parliamentary salaries by 10%. He strongly opposed a proposal to replace Port Adelaide trains with a tram line.

== Defeat and post-political career ==
In November 1929, it was reported that Thompson would not recontest his House of Assembly seat at the 1930 election and would instead run for the Central No. 1 District of the Legislative Council against Condon, who had won a by-election for the upper house. He cited his rationale for his Legislative Council bid as being his opposition to the "personnel" of Labor Prime Minister of Australia James Scullin. He was defeated in his Legislative Council bid, and Protestant Labor colleagues who contested his old seat were also unsuccessful. In 1931, he unsuccessfully contested a Legislative Council by-election caused by the death of Tom Gluyas, contesting on a platform including free education, support for private enterprise and abolishing the Arbitration Courts and replacing them with round-table conferences.

After his political career, Thompson continued to serve as a justice of the peace in Port Adelaide, returned to involvement in soccer organisations, and was president of the Grote Street Model School Old Scholars' Association.

Thompson had several children, two of whom fought in World War I. One son, G. T. Thompson, was killed at Villers-Bretonneux, while another, E. F. Thompson, returned, but died of an illness in 1926 at only 31.
