= Single Tax League =

Former South Australian political party

Single Tax League Single Tax League
- Founded: ca 1910s
- Dissolved: ca 1941
- Ideology: Georgism
- Political position: Centre to Centre-left

The Single Tax League was a Georgist Australian political party that flourished throughout the 1920s and 1930s based on support for single tax.

Based upon the ideas of Henry George, who argued that all taxes should be abolished, save for a single tax on unimproved land values, the Single Tax League was founded shortly after World War I, and a newspaper, the People's Advocate was published. The League had pockets of support throughout Australia but none more than on the west coast of South Australia, whose farmers and graziers saw merit in single tax theory. A great proponent of the theory was J. Medway Day via his short-lived weekly newspaper The Voice.

The League's sole parliamentary representative was Edward Craigie, who was elected to the South Australian House of Assembly seat of Flinders (covering the League's west coast power base) in the 1930 state election. Though the party first contested the 1918 state election, the onset of the Great Depression in Australia had led people to seek radical solutions and the manifesto of the League seemed as likely to solve their woes as any government devised plan.

Craigie worked tirelessly to have a single tax system instituted in South Australia but faced stiff opposition from the conservative Liberal Federation (and their successors, the Liberal and Country League), which despised the idea of a single tax, and the Labor Party, which was opposed to the League's free trade stance.

Craigie was re-elected in the South Australian lower house seat of Flinders at the 1933 and 1938 state elections before being defeated at the 1941 state election as an independent, despite leading on first preferences with 38 percentage, when the ideas of the Single Tax League already seemed an anachronism to most people. The League did not field any further candidates and drifted into obscurity.

== Election results ==
Date	Votes			Seats		Position	Size
Date	No.	%	± pp	No.	±	Position	Size
1918	1,398	0.43	New	0 / 46	New	Extra-parliamentary	5th
1921	Did not run.						
1924	Did not run.						
1927	1,923	0.40	▼0.3	0 / 46	0	Extra-parliamentary	▼5th
1930	2,777	1.32	▲0.92	1 / 46	▲1	Opposition	▲4th
1933	5,429	3.12	▲1.80	1 / 46	0	Opposition	▼5th
1938	1,451	0.66	▼2.46	1 / 39	0	Extra-parliamentary	▲3rd
