= 1927 South Australian state election =

- 26 March 1927

All 46 seats in the South Australian House of Assembly 24 seats were needed for a majority
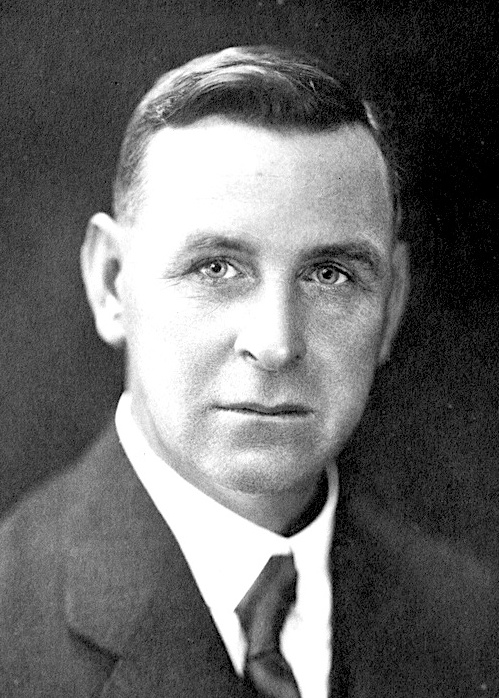

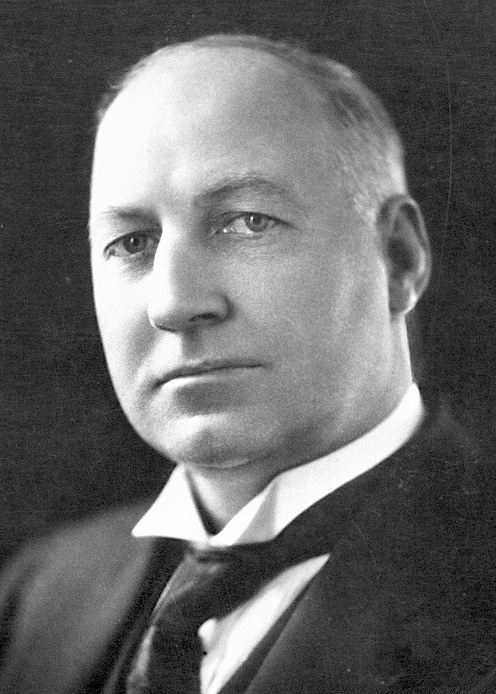

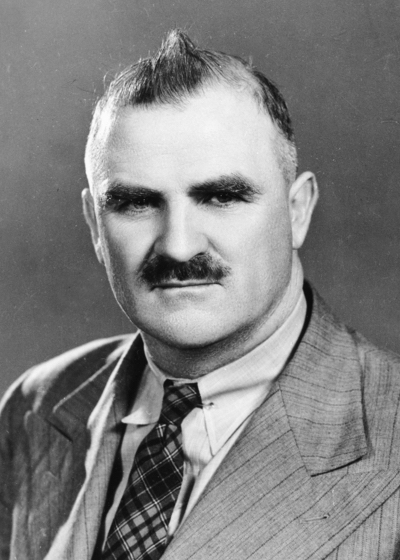
| | First party | Second party | Third party |
|---|---|---|---|
| Leader | Richard L. Butler | Lionel Hill | Archie Cameron |
| Party | Liberal Federation | Labor | Country |
| Leader since | 17 December 1925 | 28 August 1926 | 26 March 1927 |
| Leader's seat | Wooroora | Port Pirie | Wooroora |
| Last election | 17 seats | 27 seats | 2 seats |
| Seats won | 23 seats | 16 seats | 5 seats |
| Seat change | ▲6 | ▼11 | ▲3 |
| Percentage | 40.02% | 47.99% | 5.44% |
| Swing | ▼1.68% | ▼0.37 | ▼3.56 |
Premier before election
Lionel Hill
Labor
Elected Premier
Richard L. Butler
Liberal Federation

State elections were held in South Australia on 26 March 1927. All 46 seats in the South Australian House of Assembly were up for election. The incumbent Australian Labor Party government led by Premier of South Australia Lionel Hill was defeated by the opposition Liberal Federation led by Leader of the Opposition Richard L. Butler, and the Country Party (SA) led by Archie Cameron. Each district elected multiple members, with voters casting multiple votes.

Before the election, the Liberal Federation attempted to enter in to a formal coalition with the Country Party, but when this was rejected, Country Party candidates were given no Liberal opposition in six seats in five rural electorates.

== Results ==
Arrangement of the House of Assembly after the 1927 state election.

South Australian state election, 26 March 1927 House of Assembly << 1924–1930 >>
| Enrolled voters | 309,588 | | | | |
| Votes cast | 214,738 | | Turnout | 77.43% | +14.71% |
| Informal votes | 3,943 | | Informal | N/A | |
Summary of votes by party
| Party | Primary votes | % | Swing | Seats | Change |
| Labor | 243,450 | 47.99% | +0.65% | 16 | – 11 |
| Liberal Federation | 203,050 | 40.02% | –1.68% | 23 | + 6 |
| Country | 27,617 | 5.44% | –3.56% | 5 | + 3 |
| Protestant Labour | 10,560 | 2.08% | +2.08% | 1 | + 1 |
| Single Tax League | 1,923 | 0.40% | –0.20% | 0 | ± 0 |
| Independent | 20,720 | 5.10% | +4.60% | 1 | + 1 |
| Total | 507,320 | | | 46 | |

== See also ==
- Results of the South Australian state election, 1927 (House of Assembly)
- Candidates of the South Australian state election, 1927
- Members of the South Australian House of Assembly, 1927–1930
- Members of the South Australian Legislative Council, 1927–1930
