= Albert Sutton (politician) =

Australian politician

Albert Thomas Sutton (11 December 1874 – 2 November 1946) was an Australian politician who represented the South Australian House of Assembly multi-member seat of East Torrens from 1927 to 1930 for the Liberal Federation.

In local politics, he was mayor of the Corporate Town of St Peters from 1923 to 1926.
