= Edward Craigie =

Australian politician

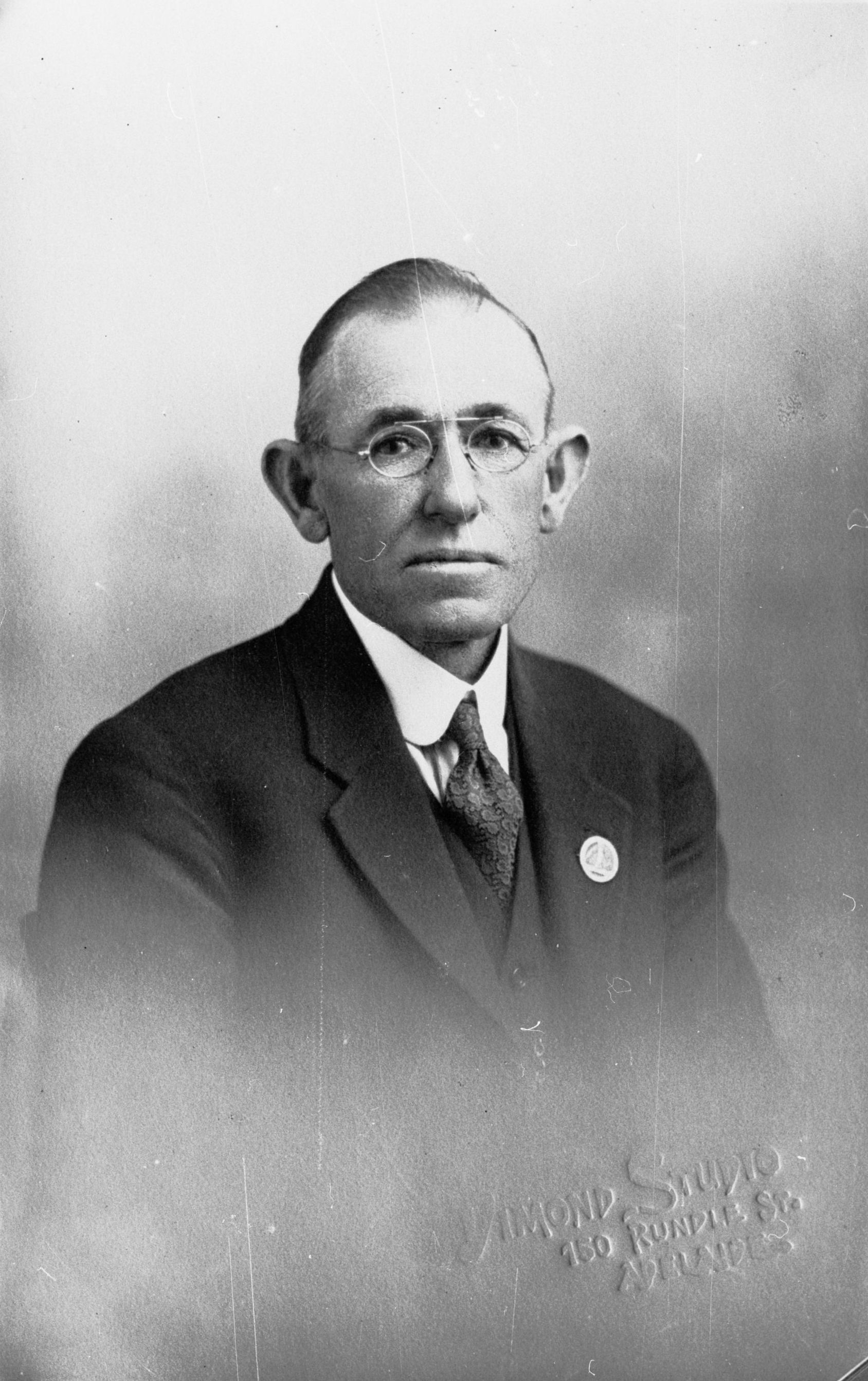
Edward John Craigie, ca. 1935

Edward John Craigie (5 September 1871 – 17 January 1966) was a Single Tax League member for the South Australian House of Assembly seat of Flinders from 1930 to 1941.

Born and raised in Moonta, South Australia, the son of Scottish parents, Craigie left school aged 11, initially working as an office boy before stints as a baker and butcher in Adelaide. From an early age, Craigie believed there needed to be a drastic overhaul of society to benefit the less privileged. Initially attracted to socialism, Craigie was converted to the ideas of Henry George who argued that all taxes should be abolished except for a single tax on unimproved land values (Craigie referred to it as a tax on "the rental value of land brought into existence by the collective presence of the people.")

Returning to Moonta in 1904, Craigie joined the United Labor Party (the predecessor of the Labor Party) with the aim of incorporating single tax theory as party policy and worked as a political journalist for local papers. Craigie was elected as a Corporate Town of Moonta councillor in 1905 and successfully introduced a single tax system throughout the council area, believing this to be the first step towards the nationwide institution of a tax on unimproved land values. Considering his work done in Moonta, Craigie resigned from the council and the Labor Party in 1911 to serve as Secretary of the Henry George League of South Australia and form the Single Tax League in order to contest elections and gain support for single tax theory.

Over the next two decades, Craigie unsuccessfully contested federal (including the 1914 Adelaide by-election), state and Adelaide City Council elections on the platform of single tax, either as a Single Tax League, Commonwealth Liberal Party, or Liberal Union candidate but still found time to marry, write a raft of treatises on tax reform and, from 1921, serve as editor of the League's newspaper, the People's Advocate.

Craigie finally found electoral success in 1930 in the South Australian House of Assembly Electoral district of Flinders, which covered the west coast of South Australia, the stronghold of single tax theory in Australia. The onset of the Great Depression had led to widespread public belief that the tax system had become too burdensome and complex and many sought a simpler solution, for which the single tax theory spruiked by Craigie seemed the answer.

Described as "a small, mild and rather insignificant man", Craigie spent his time in parliament advocating, to the exclusion of all other issues, single tax theory, was considered by many to be a colossal bore and his speeches, usually long, were generally very dull. Craigie also had to deal with the enmity of Labor supporters who considered him a rat for leaving the ALP. They showed their displeasure by hurling fruit and attacking him during public meetings.

Nevertheless, Craigie was re-elected to Flinders in 1933 and 1938, the latter as one of 15 independents in a House of 39 members. Fellow independent Tom Stott attempted to form an independent led government with himself as Premier but Craigie refused to support anyone who did not wish to see single tax theory instituted.

By the 1941 election the electorate had tired of Craigie and his ideas. He had however been elected President of the International Union of Single Taxers in 1939 and continued in this role as well as League Secretary, until his retirement in 1948, thereafter remaining trustee of the Henry George Foundation (Australia).

A savvy investor, Craigie died in Adelaide a wealthy man but with his life's dream unfulfilled. As one commentator noted after his death "He would have been an influential contributor to William Ewart Gladstone's last ministry; he was out of time and place in South Australia."

Parliament of South Australia
Preceded by Edward Coles	Member for Flinders; 1930–1941; Served alongside: James Moseley, Arthur Christian	Succeeded by Rex Pearson
