= William George Mills =

Australia sheep breeder and politician (1859–1933)

William George James Mills (7 September 1859 – 20 September 1933), generally referred to as W. G. Mills, was a sheep breeder and politician in South Australia.

== History ==
William was born at "Millbrae", Native Valley, near Nairne, South Australia, the son of Richard Mills the younger (1840–1870). He was educated at Nairne public school and Rev. A. Law's grammar school at Mount Barker. He gained experience as a jackaroo for Robert Browne, manager of Winnininnie Station in the north of the State. He took over his father's farm around 1880 and continued breeding Merino sheep with some success, purchasing valuable rams from Alick J. Murray, and expanded the farm from 500 to 5,000 acres (200 to 2,020 ha), including "Bondleigh" farm, later held by his eldest son, W. Champion Mills.

In 1928 he took on his son Alec Mills as partner in "Millbrae". He purchased another property, in the Adelaide Hills, which he named "Sturtbrae", which was later subdivided as Bellevue Heights by his daughters Margaret and May.

== Politics ==
He was in 1915 a foundation member of the Farmers and Settlers' Association, and for five years its president. This Association was to become the nucleus of the Country Party in South Australia. In 1918 he successfully stood for a Northern district seat in the South Australian Legislative Council, and held that seat until 1933, when he declined to stand due to poor health.

== Family ==
He married Elizabeth Martha "Lizzie" Champion (1861–1961) on 19 July 1882; they had five sons and four daughters:

- Everlina (1883–1961) married Hugh Ross Patterson on 12 April 1906.
- W. Champion Mills (ca.1885 – 20 May 1941)
- R(ichard) Surguy Mills (ca.1886 – 26 October 1944) married Barbara Mary
- Jack Mills (ca.1889 – 11 April 1917) fought with the 11th Battalion in World War I and died in Rouen of war injuries.
- May Mills OBE (19 July 1890 – 29 January 1984), teacher at Unley High School
- Margaret Mills, nursing sister at Port Augusta Hospital
- Alec Mills (ca.1892 – ) married Phoebe M. Blacket on 29 October 1919.
- Thomas Bruce Mills (1894 – 12 August 1915) enlisted for overseas service, but died in Adelaide of meningitis, complication of measles.
- Lizzie (1900–) married Ron Loveday of Renmark on 27 August 1924.

Most members of the family were buried at Blakiston cemetery.

== Bibliography ==
- Mills, May Millbrae and its Founding Family Lutheran Publishing House, Adelaide, South Australia, 1973.
