= Henry Tossell =

Australian politician

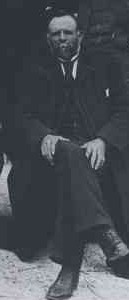

Henry George Tossell (c. 1854 – 24 March 1933) was an Australian politician who represented the South Australian House of Assembly multi-member seat of Yorke Peninsula from 1915 to 1930 for the Liberal Union and Liberal Federation.

His family migrated to South Australia when he was young, and he spent most of his time in the Mount Barker region. He worked for the Jeanes Brothers firm as a road contractor and became its manager before starting his own contracting business; he subsequently became a farmer near Maitland. As a contractor for the local road board, he was once the highest individual wage payer in his district. Tossell was one of the original members of the Farmers and Producers Political Union. He was an officer and councillor of the District Council of Yorke Peninsula for 27 years.

He was elected to the safe conservative House of Assembly seat of Yorke Peninsula at the 1915 state election, and was re-elected four times. He retired at the 1930 election.

Tossell's wife died in August 1918 following a serious illness.
