= William Humphrey Harvey =

Australian politician

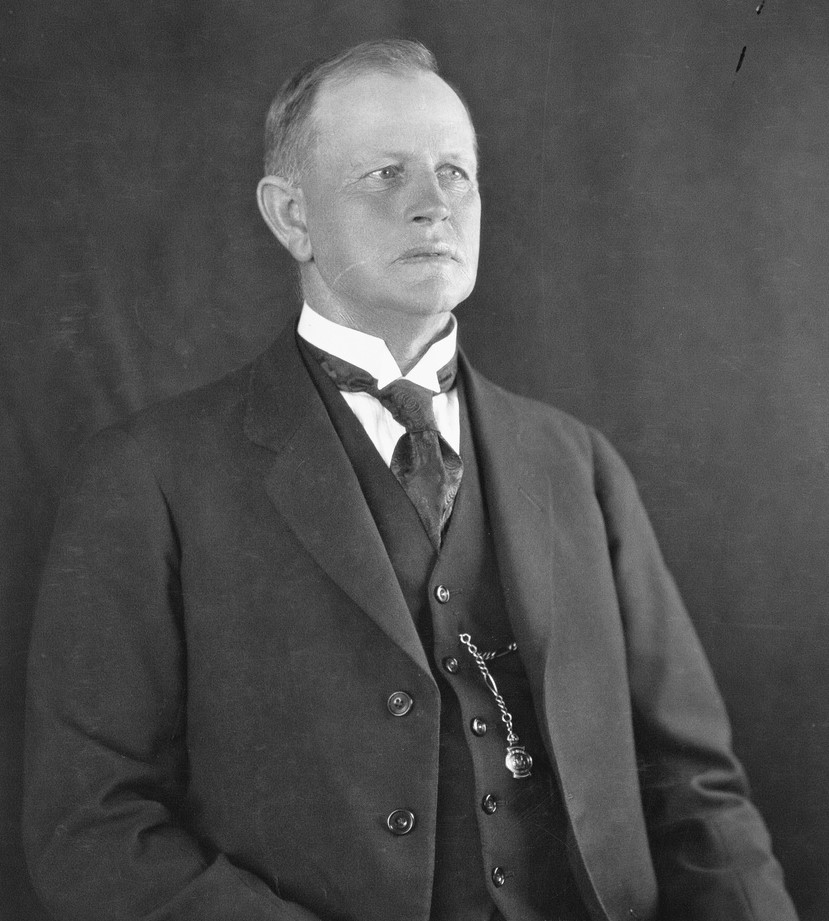

William Humphrey Harvey (2 May 1869 – 6 November 1935) was an Australian politician. He was a member of the South Australian Legislative Council from 1915 to 1935. He served as Minister for Education, Mines and Agriculture from 1918 to 1920.

== History ==
Harvey was born at Moonta Mines and attended the local state school. On leaving school, he found employment with the Moonta Mining and Smelting Company, and learned the trade of moulder. He was secretary of the Moonta Miners' Association from 1897 to 1915. He was the unsuccessful Labor candidate for the federal seat of Wakefield at the 1913 election and 1914 election.

In August 1915, he was elected unopposed as a Labor member of the Legislative Council representing the Central No. 2 District. He left Labor to join the new National Party in the 1917 Labor split, and in 1918 he was appointed Education minister in the Coalition government, succeeding Alfred William Styles. Harvey was forced to resign when the Liberal Union severed the coalition in late 1920; however, in July 1921 he defected to the Liberal Union himself.

He married Mary Louisa Chapman in 1895. They had two sons and one daughter.

He was a longtime member of the Independent Order of Oddfellows' Manchester Unity lodge and filled all positions, and the Rose Park Masonic Lodge. He was on the council of the School of Mines

He died after a short illness and was accorded a State Funeral.

The election held to fill his seat in the Legislative Council was narrowly won by industrialist Edward Wheewall Holden for the Liberal and Country League.

== Family ==
He was married to Mary Louisa and had a daughter, Mrs. A. T. Buttery of Toorak and two sons, E. W. Harvey of Wayville, South Australia, and L. J. Harvey of Hilltown.

Their home for many years was 35 Prescott Avenue, Rose Park.
