= Reginald Carter (politician) =

Australian politician

Reginald Joseph Carter (24 April 1887 – 15 March 1961) was an Australian politician who represented the South Australian House of Assembly multi-member seat of Burra Burra from 1927 to 1930. He was elected for the Country Party, but resigned to join the larger Liberal Federation in February 1928 after the failure of amalgamation talks between the parties.
