= James Moseley (politician) =

Australian politician (1848–1937)

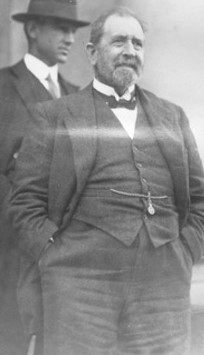

James Grey Moseley CMG (April 1848 - 10 July 1937) was an Australian politician who represented the South Australian House of Assembly seat of Flinders from 1910 to 1933. He was part of the Liberal Union, Liberal Federation and Liberal and Country League.

== History ==
Moseley was born in Gawler, a son of Alice Moseley, née Maynard (c. 1819 – 25 April 1895) and Henry Jackson Moseley (c. 1819 – 6 July 1894), who emigrated with two brothers aboard Tam O'Shanter which arrived in 1836 as part of the First Fleet of South Australia, and is remembered for building the Pier Hotel, Glenelg.

He was educated at J(ames) Mordey Mitchell's Glenelg Educational Institution, and on leaving was drawn to pastoral development, and around 1867, with his brother Thomas (1845–1896) left home with a combined capital of £800, which they put into a property, which might have been Coondambo Station, some 180 miles (290 km) north-west of Port Augusta. They were defeated by drought and lost everything, and returned to Adelaide. Minutes of Evidence in the report of the 1927 Royal Commission into the Pastoral Industry, taken Monday June 14, 1926 (Parliament House, Adelaide) state that James Moseley said that he and his brother had an interest in the establishment of the opening of Wilcherry, north of Kimba, South Australia, and that 'we spent £800 on it, but prices were so low that we could not carry on, and we went to work again. The next venture was Coondambo.'

For a time he managed Yadlamalka and Black Point stations, and in 1880, having raised sufficient capital, returned to Coondambo, and went into partnership with the owner Robert Bruce (c. 1835 – 4 November 1908). They were the first in northern South Australia to employ wire netting to keep out wild dogs and the rabbit pest, which they exterminated by fencing off the watercourses and waiting for a heatwave. He was also the first to sink a well in the north-west country. They sold Coondambo by auction at White's Rooms in 1879, realizing a substantial profit, then Moseley took up Yadlamalka Station, of 11,000 acres (45 km^{2}), which he purchased in 1888.

Shortly after 1900 Moseley took over the neglected Yardea, Paney, Pondana, Yarloo and Carcuppa stations in the Gawler Ranges, turning them from degraded land overrun with rabbits into a profitable sheep run. He ringed the properties with 150 miles (240 km) of wire netting fencing, in conjunction with Andrew Tennant's adjacent Thurlga Station, which he later purchased. Within twenty years had disposed of them at a substantial profit. He was also the first pastoralist to pipe water into the sheep runs.

In 1910 he left the land and was elected to the House of Assembly seat of Flinders, which encompassed Eyre Peninsula, which he knew well, and was regularly returned until he retired 22 years later. He was known as a stalwart fighter for the "man on the land", particularly those in the outback. He was known as the father of the Tod River scheme for his promotion of that reservoir.

His remains were interred at the Mitcham General Cemetery.

== Family ==
Moseley married twice and had a son James Moseley of Keith and four daughters. They had a home at Prescott Terrace, Rose Park.

== Recognition ==
- His name is commemorated in the geographical areas of Moseley Knob; Lake Moseley, Mount Moseley and the Hundred of Moseley; and in Moseley Square, Glenelg.
- He received the C.M.G. in the New Year Honors list of 1937.

Parliament of South Australia
Preceded by John Travers; Edgar Hampton Warren	Member for Flinders; 1910–1933; Served alongside: O'Loghlin, Travers, Chapman, O'Connor, Coles, Craigie	Succeeded by Arthur Christian
