= Herbert Richards =

Australian politician

Herbert Clarence Richards (30 January 1876 – 11 April 1949), commonly referred to as H. C. Richards, was an Australian coachbuilder and politician who represented the South Australian House of Assembly multi-member seat of Sturt from 1921 to 1930 for the Liberal Union and Liberal Federation.

Richards was the eldest son of Tobias John Martin Richards (1850–1939) and Matilda Emily Richards, née Freeman (16 February 1854 – 25 January 1938), and succeeded his father as chairman of directors of T. J. Richards & Sons, coachbuilders and motor body builders of Hindmarsh Square, Adelaide.

He was mayor of Unley 1921–1922.

South Australian House of Assembly
Preceded by Arthur Blackburn	Member for Sturt; 1921–1930; Served alongside: George Hussey, Edward Vardon, Ernest Anthoney	Succeeded by Bob Dale
