= Peter Reidy =

Australian politician

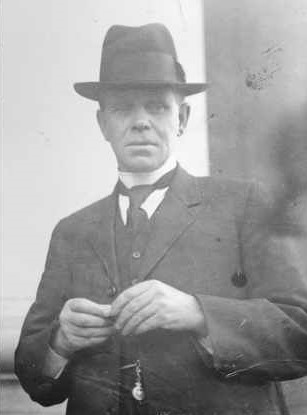

Peter Reidy (c. 1871 – 17 January 1932) was an Australian politician who represented the South Australian House of Assembly multi-member seat of Victoria from 1915 to 1932. He was elected for the United Labor Party, joined the National Party in 1917 and the Liberal Federation from 1923.

Parliament of South Australia
New seat	Member for Victoria; 1915–1932; Served alongside: Goode, Petherick, Shepherd	Succeeded by Vernon Petherick
