= Clement Collins =

Australian politician

Clement Reuben Collins (13 March 1892 – 9 April 1959) was an Australian politician who represented the South Australian House of Assembly multi-member seat of Murray from 1924 to 1933. He was elected as a member of the Labor Party, but was expelled from the party in the 1931 Labor split and sat with the splinter Parliamentary Labor Party for the remainder of his term.

Collins was a dairy farmer at Wall Flat before entering politics.
