= Frederick Birrell =

Australian typographer and politician

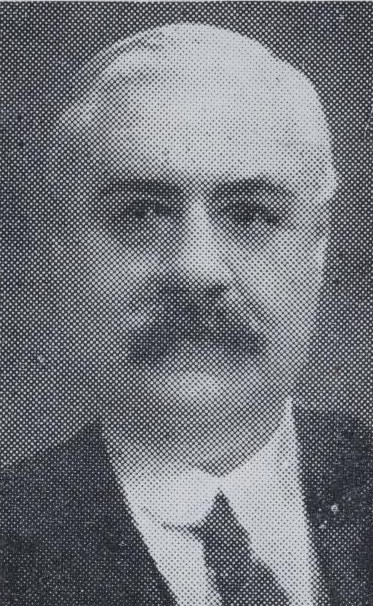

Frederick William Birrell (27 August 1869 – 20 January 1939) was an Australian typographer and politician.

== History ==
Birrell was born in North Adelaide, a twin son of Eliza Birrell (née Banks) and Andrew Birrell, labourer, who married in 1865, then deserted his wife soon after Frederick and Albert Ernest Birrell were born. (Note: Not to be confused with Andrew Birrell who married Agnes Gunyon on 19 November 1839.) She and her children were helped by (later Sir) Robert Kyffin Thomas, general manager of the South Australian Register, and Frederick later gained employment as a printer with The Register and in 1892 became a member of the Typographical Society of South Australia. A few years later he started work at the Labor Party newspaper, The Herald, as a linotype operator. He also served as a journalist and member of its board of management.

Birrell represented the South Australian House of Assembly seat of North Adelaide from 1921 to 1933 for the Labor Party. He served as Speaker of the South Australian House of Assembly from 1926 to 1927.

== Family ==
Birrell married Ellen Thomas, a machinist, at College Park on 15 October 1903. They had no children.

Family relationship to S.A. unionist and MHR Frederick Ronald Birrell (1913–1985), if any, has not been found.

== Notes and references ==
Parliament of South Australia
| Preceded by John McInnes | Speaker of the South Australian House of Assembly; 1926–1927 | Succeeded by George Laffer |
