= Archie Cameron =

Australian politician (1895–1956)

The Honourable Archie Cameron
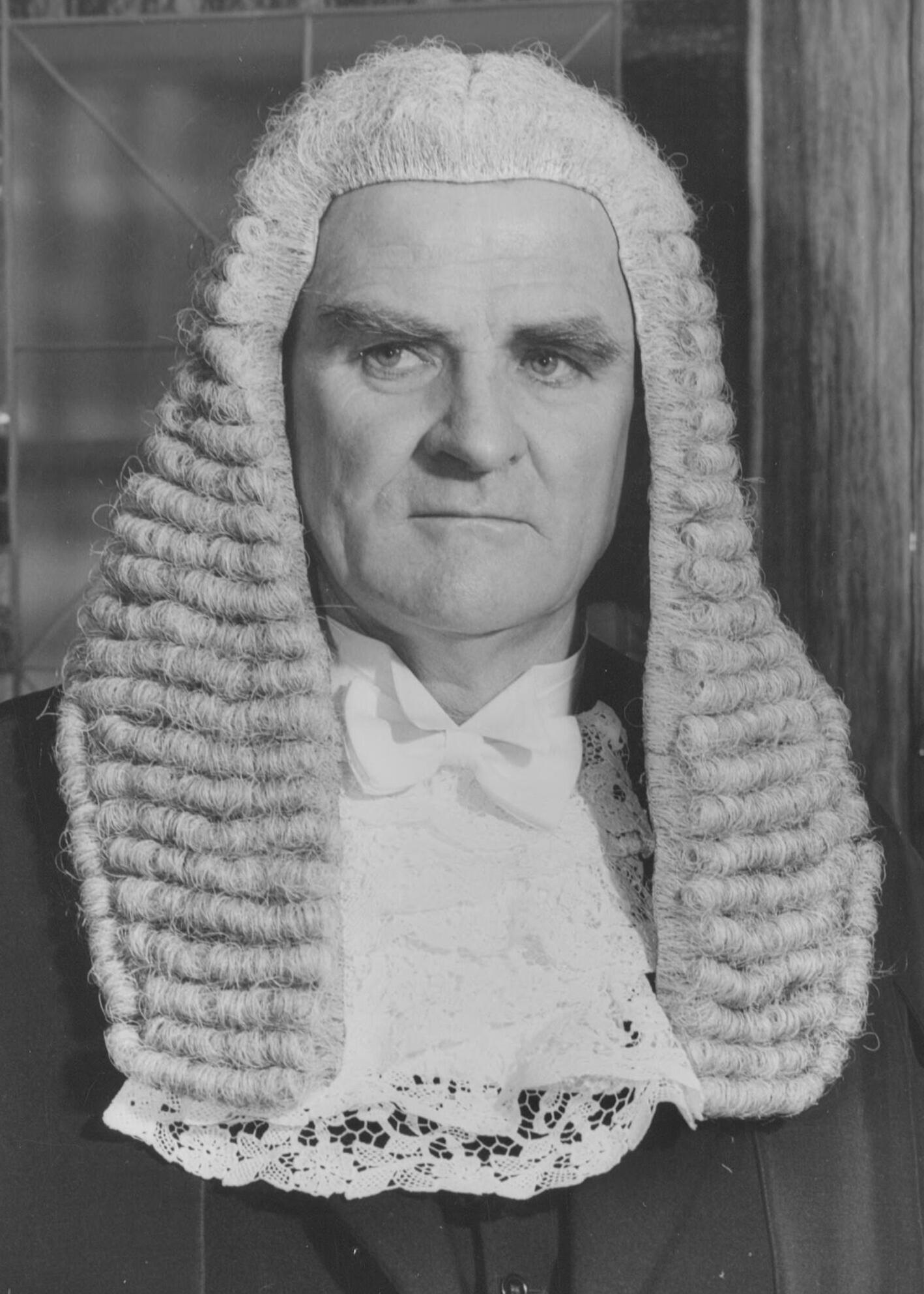
- Cameron as Speaker of the House

12th Speaker of the Australian House of Representatives
- In office 22 February 1950 – 9 August 1956
- Preceded by: Sol Rosevear
- Succeeded by: Sir John McLeay

Leader of the Country Party
- In office 13 September 1939 – 16 October 1940
- Deputy: Harold Thorby; Arthur Fadden
- Preceded by: Earle Page
- Succeeded by: Arthur Fadden

Minister for Commerce
- In office 14 March 1940 – 28 October 1940
- Prime Minister: Robert Menzies
- Preceded by: Sir Earle Page
- Succeeded by: George McLeay

Minister for Navy
- In office 14 March 1940 – 28 October 1940
- Prime Minister: Robert Menzies
- Preceded by: Frederick Stewart
- Succeeded by: Billy Hughes

Postmaster-General
- In office 7 November 1938 – 26 April 1939
- Prime Minister: Joseph Lyons; Earle Page
- Preceded by: Alexander McLachlan
- Succeeded by: Eric Harrison

Member of the Australian Parliament for Barker
- In office 15 September 1934 – 9 August 1956
- Preceded by: Malcolm Cameron
- Succeeded by: Jim Forbes

Leader of the South Australian Country Party
- In office 1928 – 9 June 1932
- Preceded by: Malcolm McIntosh
- Succeeded by: party abolished

Member of the South Australian Parliament for Wooroora
- In office 26 March 1927 – 7 August 1934
- Preceded by: Allan Robertson
- Succeeded by: Albert Robertson

Personal details
- Born: 22 March 1895 Happy Valley, South Australia, Australia
- Died: 9 August 1956 (aged 61) Sydney, New South Wales, Australia
- Party: Country (federal, 1927–40); Country (state, until 1932); LCL (state, 1932–1934); UAP (1940–44); Liberal (1944–56)
- Spouse: Margaret Walsh (m. 1925)
- Occupation: Farmer

Archie Galbraith Cameron (22 March 1895 – 9 August 1956) was an Australian politician. He was a government minister under Joseph Lyons and Robert Menzies, leader of the Country Party from 1939 to 1940, and finally Speaker of the House of Representatives from 1950 until his death.

Cameron was born in Happy Valley, South Australia. After serving in World War I, he took up a farm near Loxton as a soldier settler. He was elected to the South Australian House of Assembly in 1927, and to the House of Representatives at the 1934 federal election. Cameron was Postmaster-General in the Lyons government from 1938 to 1939. He replaced Earle Page as leader of the Country Party in September 1939, and in March 1940 led the party back into coalition with the United Australia Party (UAP), which Page had broken off. Cameron was de facto deputy prime minister under Menzies, as well as Minister for Commerce and Minister for the Navy. However, he was deposed as Country Party leader in October 1940, subsequently defecting to the UAP (and later joining the new Liberal Party). Cameron's last appointment was as Speaker, where he was highly respected. He was known throughout his political career for his eccentric manner and strong personality.

== Early life ==
Cameron was born on 22 March 1895 in Happy Valley, South Australia, the son of Mary Ann (née McDonald) and John Cameron. His parents were both immigrants from Scotland.

Cameron attended the state school at Nairne until the age of twelve. After leaving school he worked as a labourer, including on his father's farm near Loxton. He enlisted in the Australian Imperial Force (AIF) in April 1916, as a private in the 27th Battalion. He was later appointed as a warrant officer and held the temporary rank of regimental quartermaster sergeant, serving on the Western Front in France and Belgium. His exposure to poison gas during the war caused him heart and lung problems in later life.

Cameron returned to Australia in July 1919 and was formally discharged from the AIF in September 1919. In the same year he commenced farming at Noora, near the Victorian border, under a soldier settlement scheme. He was largely self-educated and was said to be "a prodigious reader of military strategy, biography, economics and foreign affairs, much of it in French and German". He reportedly became a fluent German speaker through his association with Barossa Germans.

== State politics ==
Cameron served on the Loxton District Council from 1920 to 1927. An early member of the Country Party, he unsuccessfully stood for the South Australian House of Assembly seat of Wooroora at the 1924 state election. He reprised his candidacy in Wooroora at the 1927 state election and was elected.

Cameron was elected state leader of the Country Party in 1928. Prior to the 1931 federal election he was involved in the formation of the Emergency Committee of South Australia as a united anti-Labor party. In 1932 he led his party into a merger with the Liberal Federation to form the Liberal and Country League. The Country Party's terms were stiff; among them, Cameron sought to transfer to federal politics, and wanted a safe seat in which to run at the next election. Accordingly, Cameron resigned from state parliament in 1934 in order to run in that year's federal election.

== Early years in federal politics ==
Cameron was elected to the House of Representatives at the 1934 federal election, standing as the LCL candidate in the seat of Barker. He joined the parliamentary Country Party upon his election, in accordance with LCL rules which allowed their federal MPs to choose to sit with either the Country Party or the United Australia Party (UAP). Shortly after taking his seat he moved a motion to expel Lang Labor MP Jock Garden from parliament for his former Communist affiliation, which caused a "near-riot".

Cameron did not have long to wait for ministerial preferment; in 1937 he was appointed an assistant minister in the government of Joseph Lyons. In November 1937, Cameron stood for the deputy leadership of the Country Party following the retirement of Thomas Paterson; he did not win enough votes to make the second ballot. He briefly served as acting minister for commerce in 1938, and during that time became the first minister to be "named" by the Speaker. Later that year, he became Postmaster-General. He temporarily suspended radio 2KY's licence because he objected to political views expressed on it (2KY was the property of the ALP's New South Wales branch).

== Country Party leader, 1939–1940 ==
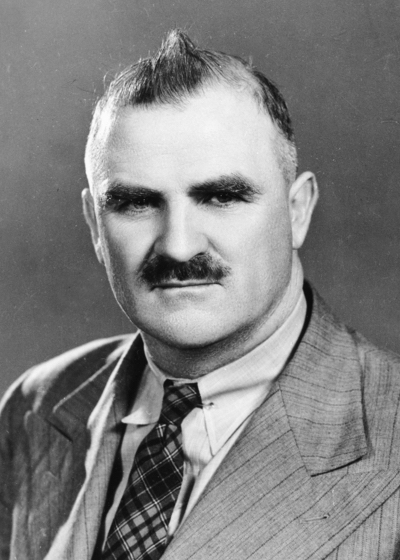
Cameron as Country Party leader

Cameron was elected leader of the Country Party on 13 September 1939, following the resignation of Earle Page. He defeated John McEwen by seven votes to five, with two abstentions. According to McEwen, the result was skewed by the absence of four MPs who had refused to sit with the Country Party with Page as leader – a motion to re-admit them was defeated by seven votes to six. McEwen claimed in his memoirs that the dissident MPs were "all strong supporters of mine and, had they been allowed to vote, I would have won the election". They were all re-admitted to the party a few months later.

In March 1940, Cameron took the Country Party back into the coalition government under Menzies, becoming the de facto deputy prime minister as well as Minister for Commerce and Minister for the Navy. The Country Party lost three seats to Labor 1940 election, costing the Coalition its majority. Country Party MPs tired of Cameron's domineering style, and removed him as leader. Arthur Fadden was chosen as interim leader and after Page and McEwen deadlocked on three ballots. Cameron then immediately resigned from the ministry, and from the Country Party: he joined Menzies's party, the United Australia Party.

== World War II ==
After his leadership defeat, Cameron rejoined the Army and spent the rest of the war on active service in the Directorate of Military Intelligence at Army Headquarters, Melbourne, where he did useful work on the Japanese order of battle. While he was in the service, he faced what would be his only really close electoral contest. At the 1943 election, trade unionist Harry Krantz slashed Cameron's majority from a comfortably safe 15.9 percent to an extremely marginal 1.7 percent. Cameron was left as the only non-Labor MP from South Australia, and the only non-Labor member outside the eastern states (the member for Northern Territory, Adair Blain, was an independent, but did not have full voting rights).

During World War II, Cameron was a strong supporter of mass internment of enemy aliens. In November 1940, shortly after his resignation from the ministry, the Australian War Cabinet decided to allow interned aliens the right to appeal their internment to a tribunal. While remaining a government backbencher, Cameron unsuccessfully moved for the disallowance of the relevant regulation by the House of Representatives and in April 1941 moved a no-confidence motion in the army minister Percy Spender for his handling of internment. Cameron argued that enemy aliens "enjoy no rights whatever" during war-time and were a "danger to the nation" unless proven otherwise, with the appeals tribunals placing the government "in the hopelessly ridiculous position of appearing before a tribunal to defend its own actions". His motion was not put to a vote as no other MP was willing to second it, but in response Spender defended his actions and stated Cameron's intent was to "indulge his peculiar megalomania in order to get some notoriety out of his action".

== Speaker of the House, 1950–1956 ==
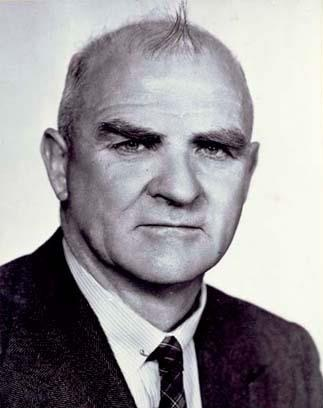
Cameron in 1950

Cameron was elected Speaker of the House following the Coalition's victory at the 1949 election. He was nominated by Menzies for the post despite "disquiet from members" and a warning from parliamentary clerk Frank Clifton Green that he was the "worst possible choice".

Cameron reinstated the traditional practice of the speaker wearing robes and a horsehair wig. He also enforced a strict dress code in the parliamentary lobby, although he habitually wore elastic-sided boots and in the speaker's office "received visitors dressed only in shorts and a singlet". A lifelong teetotaller and non-smoker, he was a "firm moral guardian" and imposed a ban on gambling, card-playing and other games of chance in Parliament House. He once reportedly climbed over the roof of parliament and through an open window in order to ambush an illicit card game. In 1951, Cameron came into conflict with parliamentary barber Cecil Bainbrigge over his display of posters of champion race horses Comic Court and Phar Lap, which he believed promoted gambling. He forced the barber's resignation the following year, possibly over rumours that Bainbrigge had been acting as an illegal bookmaker.

Cameron was "renowned for his colourful personality and autocratic, abrasive style of managing the affairs of the House". Cameron's health never recovered from his World War I gassing, and in August 1955 he contracted influenza. Despite this, he fought that year's election and was handily reelected. He died of a heart attack in August in Royal Prince Alfred Hospital, Sydney.

== Personal life ==
Cameron married Margaret Eileen Walsh on 15 April 1925. They had a son and a daughter together; his daughter predeceased him.

Cameron was raised Presbyterian, but later converted to Catholicism, which was his wife's religion. The Sydney Morning Herald reported in 1950 that he was a "deeply religious man". In parliament, he attracted attention for choosing to make an affirmation rather than swear the oath of office. He did so each time he was elected and was the only member of the House of Representatives to do so during his time in office; after his death no other MPs chose to make an affirmation until 1969. He told an interviewer that "if a man's word is worthless no amount of oath-taking will make him worthy".

Political offices
Preceded by Alexander McLachlan	Postmaster-General; 1938–1939	Succeeded by Eric Harrison
Preceded by George McLeay	Minister for Commerce; 1940	Succeeded by Earle Page
Preceded by Frederick Stewart	Minister for the Navy; 1940	Succeeded by Billy Hughes
Parliament of Australia
Preceded by Sol Rosevear	Speaker of the Australian House of Representatives; 1949–1956	Succeeded by Sir John McLeay
Preceded by Malcolm Cameron	Member for Barker; 1934–1956	Succeeded by Jim Forbes
Party political offices
Preceded by Earle Page	Leader of the Country Party; 1939–1940	Succeeded by Arthur Fadden
