= Herbert George (politician) =

Australian politician (1872–1957)

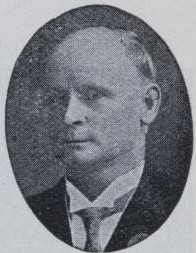

Herbert John George (6 June 1872 – 4 September 1957) was an Australian politician. He was the Labor member for Adelaide in the South Australian House of Assembly from 1926 to 1933 and from 1947 to 1950.

He was secretary of the Locomotive Engineers' Union throughout his first term in parliament.

His brother, Even George, was also a state Labor MP.

South Australian House of Assembly
Preceded by John Gunn	Member for Adelaide; 1926–1933; Served alongside: Bill Denny, Bert Edwards	Succeeded by Bob Dale
Preceded by Bob Dale	Member for Adelaide; 1947–1950	Succeeded by Sam Lawn
