= Frederick McMillan =

Australian politician

Frederick Murray McMillan (22 March 1884 – 20 December 1963) was an Australian politician who represented the South Australian House of Assembly seat of Albert from 1921 to 1933. He represented three different parties: the Country Party (1921–1928), the Liberal Federation (1928–1932) and the merged Liberal and Country League (1932–1933).

McMillan was a wheat farmer at Taplin before entering politics, and had served in World War I.

Parliament of South Australia
| Preceded by William Angus; Richard Alfred O'Connor | Member for Albert; 1921–1933; Served alongside: Malcolm McIntosh | Succeeded by Tom Stott |
