= Frank Condon (politician) =

Australian politician (1884–1961)

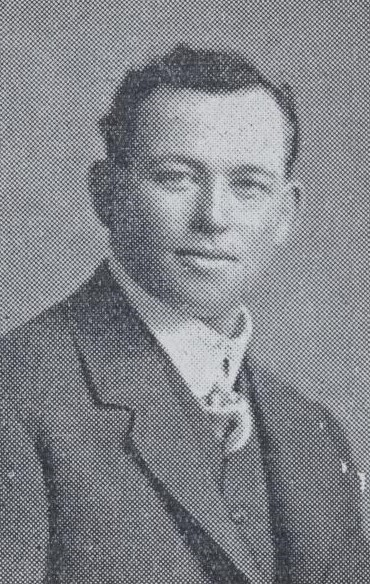

Francis Joseph "Frank" Condon, CMG (3 December 1884 – 15 July 1961) was a trade unionist and Labor politician in South Australia.

== History ==
Frank was born, perhaps in Burra, a son of William Alfred Condon (23 May 1860 – 18 March 1932), who married Catherine Tobin (24 May 1860 – ) at Kooringa, near Burra, on 15 October 1881. Frank had five brothers and one sister; all grew up in Hallam Street, Port Pirie.

He was working as a "needleman", sewing bags of flour in Port Pirie for John Dunn around 1906 when he was persuaded to move to Adelaide and organise a union for workers in the flour mills.

He was in 1910 the South Australian representative at a Federal conference which established the Federated Millers and Mill Employes Union, and was that body's South Australian Secretary from 1910 to at least 1928. He was elected Federal president of the Federated Millers and Mill Employes Association around 1930, and still held that position in 1951. In 1911 he was elected president of the Port Adelaide Trades and Labour Council. During the First World War he served on the Prices Regulation Commission, work for which he received much praise.

== Politics ==
He was elected auditor for the Port Adelaide Council in 1914, then councillor for East Ward in 1920.

Condon was elected to the seat of Port Adelaide in the House of Assembly in 1924 after defeating incumbent John Stanley Verran for Labor preselection. He was defeated by independent Protestant Labor Party candidate Thomas Thompson at the 1927 election. Condon successfully challenged the result before parliament, alleging that he had been libelled, resulting in Thompson's win being voided, but Condon lost the resulting by-election by a larger margin.

He succeeded in a bid for the Legislative Council in a by-election following the death of Andrew Kirkpatrick, and held the seat until his own death in 1961. He served on the public Works Standing Committee, which oversaw the construction Morgan-Whyalla pipeline, Mount Bold Reservoir, Anzac Highway, Birkenhead Bridge, Port Adelaide and Glenelg sewage treatment works, the operating theatre complex at the Royal Adelaide Hospital, the Uley-Wanilla Basin scheme to supply water to Port Lincoln, and Adelaide Boys' High School on West Terrace. In 1926 he was chairman of the Manufacturing and Secondary Industries Royal Commission. He was Leader of the Opposition in the Legislative Council.

== Interests ==
Frank was a keen racegoer and supporter of thoroughbred racing.

== Recognition ==
Condon was personally invested with the CMG by the Queen in 1954.

South Australian House of Assembly
Preceded by John Stanley Verran	Member for Port Adelaide; 1924–1927	Succeeded by Thomas Thompson
South Australian Legislative Council
Preceded by Andrew Kirkpatrick	Member for Central District No. 1; 1928–1961	Succeeded by Alfred Kneebone
