= Country Party (South Australia) =

Political party in South Australia

Country Party (SA)
- Founded: 1917
- Dissolved: 1932
- Merged into: Liberal and Country League
- Colors: Green

The Country Party was a political party in South Australia in the first part of the 20th century. It was formed out of the Farmers and Settlers Association in September 1917 to represent the association's interests in parliament. The party endorsed seven candidates in the 1918 election, with two elected. In the early years, their representatives were usually identified as Farmers and Settlers' Association representatives or as the parliamentary wing of the Farmers and Settlers' Association, but referred to in some sources as Country Party, Independent Country Party or independent members. The Country Party name was formally adopted after the 1921 election.

The Country Party eventually merged with the Liberal Federation to create the Liberal and Country League (LCL) in 1932. As part of the merger agreement, state Country Party leader Archie Cameron was handed the federal seat of Barker, and eventually became federal leader of the party in 1939. Despite the winding-up of the Country Party at state level, the federal Country Party remained active in South Australia until 1940, when Cameron was ousted in a party room coup.

An independent Country Party, now The Nationals South Australia, was resurrected in 1962.

== Elections contested ==
Through its life, the party contested five general elections. The House of Assembly (lower house) is completely elected each time. Only half of the Legislative Council (upper house) faces election each time, and a term was normally for six years. The legislative Council consisted of five electorates each of which had four members, with two terms expiring at each election.

- 1918 South Australian state election

As Farmers and Settlers, winning 1 seat in the House of Assembly and one in the Legislative Council
- John Chapman - Flinders
- William George Mills - Northern - Legislative Council

- 1921 South Australian state election

As Farmers and Settlers, winning 4 seats in the House of Assembly (Mills continued in the Legislative Council)
- John Chapman - Flinders
- Thomas Hawke - Burra Burra
- Malcolm McIntosh - Albert
- Frederick McMillan - Albert

- 1924 South Australian state election

As the Country Party, winning two seats in the House of Assembly and two in the Legislative Council
- Malcolm McIntosh - Albert
- Frederick McMillan - Albert
- Percy Blesing - Northern - Legislative Council (elected for half-term)
- William George Mills - Northern - Legislative Council (elected for half-term)

- 1927 South Australian state election

As part of a coalition of the Liberal Federation and the Country Party, known at the time as the Pact Party The coalition won back government with 28 of the 46 seats in the House of Assembly. The successful Country Party candidates were:
- Archie Cameron - Wooroora
- Reginald Carter - Burra Burra
- Edward Coles - Flinders
- Malcolm McIntosh - Albert
- Frederick McMillan - Albert
- Percy Blesing - Northern - Legislative Council
- William George Mills - Northern - Legislative Council

- 1930 South Australian state election as the Country Party (Blesing and Mills continued in the Legislative Council)

- Archie Cameron - Wooroora
- Samuel Dennison - Wooroora

The membership transferred to the Liberal and Country League (LCL) in 1932.

== Electoral performance ==
=== House of Assembly ===
Election	Leader	Votes	%	Seats	+/–	Position	Status
1918		13,844	4.28	1 / 46	▲1	▲4th	Crossbench
1921	John Chapman	16,417	4.09	4 / 46	▲3	▲3rd	Crossbench
1924	Malcolm McIntosh	35,551	8.94	2 / 46	▼2	3rd	Crossbench
1927	Malcolm McIntosh	27,617	5.44	5 / 46	▲3	3rd	Coalition
1930	Archie Cameron	14,555	6.93	2 / 46	▼3	3rd	Crossbench

== Leadership ==
- Malcolm McIntosh (1921-1928)
