= Liberal Federation =

Political party in South Australia

- Founded: October 16, 1923
- Dissolved: 1932
- Preceded by: Liberal Union; National Party (SA)
- Succeeded by: Liberal and Country League

The Liberal Federation was a South Australian political party from 16 October 1923 to 1932. It came into existence as a merger between the rival Liberal Union and National Party, to oppose Labor.

Encouraged by the overwhelming success of the Emergency Committee of South Australia at the 1931 federal election, the Liberal Federation merged with the Country Party to form the South Australian Liberal and Country League in 1932, again with overwhelming success at the 1933 state election.

== Parliamentary leaders ==
- Henry Barwell (1923–1925)
- Richard Layton Butler (1925–1932)

== See also ==
- Members of the South Australian House of Assembly, 1921–1924
- Members of the South Australian House of Assembly, 1924–1927
- Members of the South Australian House of Assembly, 1927–1930
- Members of the South Australian House of Assembly, 1930–1933
- Members of the South Australian Legislative Council, 1921–1924
- Members of the South Australian Legislative Council, 1924–1927
- Members of the South Australian Legislative Council, 1927–1930
- Members of the South Australian Legislative Council, 1930–1933
