= Results of the 1918 South Australian state election (House of Assembly) =

South Australian state election, 6 April 1918 House of Assembly << 1915–1921 >>
Enrolled voters	258,712				
Votes cast	132,321		Turnout	51.89%	– 23.06%
Informal votes	1,922		Informal	1.45%	+0.38%
Summary of votes by party
Party	Primary votes	%	Swing	Seats	Change
Labor	144,204	44.54%	– 1.36%	17	– 9
Liberal Union	90,453	27.94%	– 23.64%	22	+ 2
National Party	60,417	18.66%	*	6	+ 6
Farmers and Settlers	13,844	4.28%	*	1	+ 1
Single Tax League	1,398	0.43%	*	0	± 0
Farmers and Producers	1,033	0.32%	*	0	± 0
Independent	12,432	3.84%	+ 1.32%	0	± 0
Total	323,781			46	

This is a list of House of Assembly results for the 1918 South Australian state election. Each district elected multiple members.

Every voter would receive a ballot paper where they would cast 2 or 3 votes for different candidates. In electorates that were not unopposed, the 2 or 3 candidates with the most votes would be elected.

== Results by electoral district ==
=== Adelaide ===
1918 South Australian state election: Adelaide
Party	Candidate	Votes	%	±%
Labor	Bill Denny (elected)	6,768	30.2	N/A
Labor	John Gunn (elected)	5,526	24.7	N/A
Labor	Bert Edwards (elected)	5,511	24.6	N/A
National Party	Reginald Blundell	2,215	9.9	N/A
National Party	William Stephens	1,930	8.6	N/A
Independent	Selina Siggins	461	2.1	N/A
Total formal votes		22,411; 7,750 ballots	98.8	
Informal votes		90	1.2	
Turnout		7,840	36.1	
Party total votes
Labor		17,805	79.4	N/A
National Party		4,145	18.5	N/A
Independent	Selina Siggins	461	2.1	N/A

=== Albert ===
1918 South Australian state election: Albert
Party	Candidate	Votes	%	±%
Liberal Union	R. A. O'Connor (elected)	1,426	19.2	−11.9
Liberal Union	William Angus (elected)	1,290	17.4	−14.6
Farmers and Settlers	William Cowley	1,269	17.1	+17.1
Farmers and Settlers	Ernest Butler	1,260	17.0	+17.0
Labor	Robert Downie	1,107	14.9	+14.9
Labor	Charles Benson	1,062	14.3	+14.3
Total formal votes		7,414; 3,730 ballots	98.0	−0.9
Informal votes		76	2.0	+0.9
Turnout		3,806	54.0	−11.9
Party total votes
Liberal Union		2,716	36.6	−26.5
Farmers and Settlers		2,529	34.1	+34.1
Labor		2,169	29.3	+6.7

=== Alexandra ===
1918 South Australian state election: Alexandra
Party	Candidate	Votes	%	±%
Liberal Union	George Laffer (elected)	3,688	22.0	+2.4
Liberal Union	George Ritchie (elected)	3,651	21.8	+2.2
Liberal Union	Archibald Peake (elected)	3,376	20.1	+20.1
Labor	Mathew Hunt	1,876	11.2	+11.2
Labor	William Nicholls	1,799	10.7	+10.7
Labor	Walter Lodge	1,735	10.4	+10.4
Independent	Walter Furler	642	3.8	+3.8
Total formal votes		16,767; 5,755 ballots	98.4	−0.5
Informal votes		92	1.6	+0.5
Turnout		5,847	52.6	−22.6
Party total votes
Liberal Union		10,715	63.9	+5.1
Labor		5,410	32.3	−8.9
Independent	Walter Furler	642	3.8	+3.8

=== Barossa ===
1918 South Australian state election: Barossa
Party	Candidate	Votes	%	±%
Liberal Union	William Hague (elected)	3,577	16.3	−1.7
Liberal Union	Henry Crosby (elected)	3,510	16.0	+16.0
Liberal Union	Richard Butler (elected)	3,488	15.9	−2.4
Labor	Moses Gabb	3,437	15.7	+15.7
Labor	Tom Edwards	3,404	15.6	+15.6
Labor	George Cooke	3,346	15.3	+15.3
Farmers and Producers	Edmund Craig	526	2.5	+2.5
Farmers and Producers	Thomas Martin	278	1.3	+1.3
Farmers and Producers	Horace Crittenden	229	1.1	+1.1
Independent	James Scott	95	0.4	+0.4
Total formal votes		21,890; 7,383 ballots	98.6	−0.9
Informal votes		104	1.4	+0.9
Turnout		7,487	63.5	−17.5
Party total votes
Liberal Union		10,575	48.3	−5.3
Labor		10,187	46.5	0.0
Farmers and Producers		1,033	4.7	+4.7
Independent	James Scott	95	0.4	+0.4

=== Burra Burra ===
1918 South Australian state election: Burra Burra
Party	Candidate	Votes	%	±%
Labor	Harry Buxton (elected)	2,742	12.2	+12.2
Labor	Mick O'Halloran (elected)	2,718	12.1	+12.1
Liberal Union	George Jenkins (elected)	2,699	12.0	+12.0
Labor	Len Wilcot	2,695	12.0	+12.0
Liberal Union	Samuel Dickson	2,639	11.8	+11.8
National Party	Edward Pearce	2,629	11.7	+11.7
Farmers and Settlers	William Miller	2,179	9.7	+9.7
Farmers and Settlers	John Pick	2,118	9.4	+9.4
Farmers and Settlers	Laurence O'Loughlin	2,026	9.0	+9.0
Total formal votes		22,445; 7,557 ballots	99.2	+0.1
Informal votes		62	0.8	−0.1
Turnout		7,619	62.1	−14.7
Party total votes
Labor		8,155	36.3	−5.7
Farmers and Settlers		6,323	28.2	+28.2
Liberal Union		5,338	23.8	−34.2
National Party		2,629	11.7	+11.7

=== East Torrens ===
1918 South Australian state election: East Torrens
Party	Candidate	Votes	%	±%
National Party	Frederick Coneybeer (elected)	7,609	18.7	+18.7
Liberal Union	Walter Hamilton (elected)	6,802	16.8	+16.8
National Party	J. A. Southwood (elected)	6,564	16.2	+16.2
Labor	Thomas Grealy	5,745	14.1	+14.1
Labor	Herbert George	5,569	13.7	+13.7
Labor	Martin Collaton	5,483	13.5	+13.5
Independent	Victor Wilson	1,878	4.6	+4.6
Independent	Robert Hawkes	489	1.2	+1.2
Independent	Andrew Calder	483	1.2	+1.2
Total formal votes		40,622; 13,946 ballots	98.5	+0.6
Informal votes		213	1.5	−0.6
Turnout		14,159	46.4	−25.2
Party total votes
Labor		16,797	41.3	−24.5
National Party		14,173	34.9	+34.9
Liberal Union		6,802	16.8	−12.3
Independent	Reginald Wilson	1,878	4.6	+4.6
Independent	Robert Hawkes	489	1.2	+1.2
Independent	Andrew Calder	483	1.2	+1.2

=== Flinders ===
1918 South Australian state election: Flinders
Party	Candidate	Votes	%	±%
Liberal Union	James Moseley (elected)	2,152	33.3	0.0
Farmers and Settlers	John Chapman (elected)	1,686	26.1	+26.1
Single Tax League	Samuel Lindsay	1,398	21.7	+21.7
Independent Liberal	John Travers	1,221	18.9	−13.8
Total formal votes		6,457; 3,567 ballots	98.3	−0.7
Informal votes		63	1.7	+0.7
Turnout		3,630	50.5	−20.3
Party total votes
Liberal Union		2,152	33.3	−32.7
Farmers and Settlers		1,686	26.1	+26.1
Single Tax League		1,398	21.7	+21.7
Independent Liberal	John Travers	1,221	18.9	+18.9

=== Murray ===
1918 South Australian state election: Murray
Party	Candidate	Votes	%	±%
Liberal Union	Harry Young (elected)	2,964	16.5	−2.8
Liberal Union	Angas Parsons (elected)	2,846	15.9	+15.9
Labor	Sid O'Flaherty (elected)	2,668	14.9	+14.9
National Party	George Dunn	2,486	13.9	−3.4
Labor	Frank Staniford	2,430	13.5	+13.5
Labor	Samuel Willsmore	2,350	13.1	+13.1
Independent Labor	Maurice Parish	1,261	7.0	−11.2
Independent	John Kelly	528	2.9	+2.9
Independent	James Atkinson	413	2.3	+2.3
Total formal votes		17,946; 6,213 ballots	99.0	−0.3
Informal votes		63	1.0	+0.3
Turnout		6,276	56.9	−21.4
Party total votes
Labor		7,448	41.5	+6.0
Liberal Union		5,810	32.4	−19.5
National Party		2,486	13.9	+13.9
Independent Labor	Maurice Parish	1,261	7.0	+7.0
Independent	John Kelly	528	2.9	+2.9
Independent	James Atkinson	413	2.3	+2.3

=== Newcastle ===
1918 South Australian state election: Newcastle
Party	Candidate	Votes	%	±%
Labor	Thomas Butterfield (elected)	2,092	30.9	+2.5
Labor	William Harvey (elected)	1,901	28.1	+28.1
Liberal Union	Edward Twopeny	1,506	22.2	+0.7
Liberal Union	Robert Thompson	1,275	18.8	+18.8
Total formal votes		6,774; 3,464 ballots	99.1	−0.3
Informal votes		30	0.9	+0.3
Turnout		3,494	53.7	−19.0
Party total votes
Labor		3,993	58.9	+2.3
Liberal Union		2,781	41.1	−2.3

=== North Adelaide ===
1918 South Australian state election: North Adelaide
Party	Candidate	Votes	%	±%
National Party	Edward Anstey (elected)	4,383	30.2	+1.5
National Party	William Ponder (elected)	4,265	29.4	+1.6
Labor	Clarence Bennett	2,948	20.3	+20.3
Labor	Frederick Martin	2,909	20.1	+20.1
Total formal votes		14,505; 7,304 ballots	98.5	−0.4
Informal votes		112	1.5	+0.4
Turnout		7,416	46.8	−26.2
Party total votes
National Party		8,648	59.6	+59.6
Labor		5,857	40.4	−16.1

=== Port Adelaide ===
1918 South Australian state election: Port Adelaide
Party	Candidate	Votes	%	±%
Labor	John Price (elected)	5,879	32.7	N/A
Labor	John Verran (elected)	5,597	31.1	N/A
National Party	Ivor MacGillivray	3,123	17.4	N/A
National Party	Richard Gully	2,633	14.6	N/A
Independent	Allen Martin	571	3.2	N/A
Independent	Alfred Formby	192	1.1	N/A
Total formal votes		17,995; 9,076 ballots	97.0	
Informal votes		283	3.0	
Turnout		9,359	48.0	
Party total votes
Labor		11,476	63.8	N/A
National Party		5,756	32.0	N/A
Independent	Allen Martin	571	3.2	N/A
Independent	Alfred Formby	192	1.1	N/A

=== Port Pirie ===
1918 South Australian state election: Port Pirie
Party	Candidate	Votes	%	±%
Labor	Lionel Hill (elected)	2,756	33.0	N/A
Labor	John Fitzgerald (elected)	2,708	32.4	N/A
National Party	Harry Jackson	1,479	17.7	N/A
National Party	William Cole	1,414	16.9	N/A
Total formal votes		8,357; 4,263 ballots	99.2	
Informal votes		33	0.8	
Turnout		4,296	58.5	
Party total votes
Labor		5,464	65.4	N/A
National Party		2,893	34.6	N/A

=== Stanley ===
1918 South Australian state election: Stanley
Party	Candidate	Votes	%	±%
Liberal Union	Robert Nicholls (elected)	3,262	34.4	−4.0
Liberal Union	Henry Barwell (elected)	3,191	33.7	−3.9
Labor	James Scales	1,663	17.5	+17.5
Farmers and Settlers	Michael McCormack	1,368	14.4	+14.4
Total formal votes		9,484; 5,285 ballots	98.9	−0.5
Informal votes		57	1.1	+0.5
Turnout		5,342	63.0	−16.4
Party total votes
Liberal Union		6,453	68.0	−8.0
Labor		1,663	17.5	−6.5
Farmers and Settlers		1,368	14.4	+14.4

=== Sturt ===
1918 South Australian state election: Sturt
Party	Candidate	Votes	%	±%
National Party	Arthur Blackburn (elected)	7,449	19.2	+19.2
National Party	Thomas Smeaton (elected)	6,970	18.0	−0.5
Liberal Union	Edward Vardon (elected)	6,605	17.0	+17.0
Labor	Frank McCabe	4,637	11.9	+11.9
Labor	Alexander Rankin	4,614	11.9	+11.9
Labor	Tom Howard	4,521	11.6	+11.6
Independent Labor	Crawford Vaughan	2,014	5.2	−13.3
Independent	George Illingworth	786	2.0	+2.0
Independent	Jeanne Young	761	2.0	+2.0
Independent	Charles Nowling	482	1.2	+1.2
Total formal votes		38,839; 13,353 ballots	98.6	−0.3
Informal votes		185	1.4	+0.3
Turnout		13,538	44.0	−29.3
Party total votes
National Party		14,419	37.1	+37.1
Labor		13,772	35.5	−19.7
Liberal Union		6,605	17.0	−27.7
Independent Labor	Crawford Vaughan	2,014	5.2	+5.2
Independent	George Illingworth	786	2.0	+2.0
Independent	Jeanne Young	761	2.0	+2.0
Independent	Charles Nowling	482	1.2	+1.2

=== Victoria ===
1918 South Australian state election: Victoria
Party	Candidate	Votes	%	±%
Liberal Union	Vernon Petherick (elected)	3,762	25.0	+25.0
National Party	Peter Reidy (elected)	3,707	24.6	−1.7
Labor	Charles McHugh	3,259	21.7	+21.7
Labor	Stanley Whitford	3,242	21.6	+21.6
Independent	Henry Kennedy	1,081	7.2	+7.2
Total formal votes		15,051; 7,777 ballots	98.4	−0.9
Informal votes		127	1.6	+0.9
Turnout		7,904	64.5	−16.3
Party total votes
Labor		6,501	43.2	−9.1
Liberal Union		3,762	25.0	−22.7
National Party		3,707	24.6	+24.6
Independent	Henry Kennedy	1,081	7.2	+7.2

=== Wallaroo ===
1918 South Australian state election: Wallaroo
Party	Candidate	Votes	%	±%
Labor	Robert Richards (elected)	3,987	33.3	N/A
Labor	John Pedler (elected)	3,939	32.9	N/A
National Party	John Verran	2,121	17.7	N/A
National Party	John Herbert	1,943	16.2	N/A
Total formal votes		11,990; 6,004 ballots	99.3	
Informal votes		41	0.7	
Turnout		6,045	75.8	
Party total votes
Labor		7,926	66.1	N/A
National Party		4,064	33.9	N/A

=== West Torrens ===
1918 South Australian state election: West Torrens
Party	Candidate	Votes	%	±%
Labor	Alfred Blackwell (elected)	6,139	32.2	N/A
Labor	John McInnes (elected)	5,830	30.6	N/A
National Party	Henry Chesson	3,539	18.6	N/A
National Party	Thompson Green	3,538	18.6	N/A
Total formal votes		19,046; 9,602 ballots	98.0	
Informal votes		195	2.0	
Turnout		9,797	48.3	
Party total votes
Labor		11,969	62.8	N/A
National Party		7,077	37.2	N/A

=== Wooroora ===
1918 South Australian state election: Wooroora
Party	Candidate	Votes	%	±%
Liberal Union	James McLachlan (elected)	3,482	17.8	+17.8
Labor	Allan Robertson (elected)	3,045	15.6	+15.6
Liberal Union	Albert Robinson (elected)	2,887	14.8	−10.5
Labor	William Milne	2,777	14.2	+14.2
Liberal Union	Richard Butler	2,752	14.1	−12.3
Labor	Frank Nieass	2,679	13.7	+13.7
Farmers and Settlers	Samuel Dennison	1,938	9.9	+9.9
Total formal votes		19,560; 6,710 ballots	99.1	−0.5
Informal votes		62	0.9	+0.5
Turnout		6,772	65.2	−14.4
Party total votes
Liberal Union		9,121	46.6	−30.9
Labor		8,501	43.5	+28.5
Farmers and Settlers		1,938	9.9	+9.9

=== Yorke Peninsula ===
1918 South Australian state election: Yorke Peninsula
Party	Candidate	Votes	%	±%
Liberal Union	Henry Tossell (elected)	2,468	34.8	−7.4
Liberal Union	Peter Allen (elected)	2,340	33.0	−9.1
Independent	Robert Hogarth	1,145	16.1	+16.1
Independent	Robert Ford	1,141	16.1	+16.1
Total formal votes		7,094; 3,582 ballots	99.1	+0.1
Informal votes		34	0.9	−0.1
Turnout		3,616	54.8	−22.8
Party total votes
Liberal Union		4,808	67.8	−16.5
Independent	Robert Hogarth	1,145	16.1	+16.1
Independent	Robert Ford	1,141	16.1	+16.1

== See also ==
- Candidates of the 1918 South Australian state election
- Members of the South Australian House of Assembly, 1918–1921
