= Results of the 1915 South Australian state election (House of Assembly) =

South Australian state election, 27 March 1915 House of Assembly << 1912–1918 >>
Enrolled voters	181,516				
Votes cast	136,055		Turnout	74.95%	+ 3.09%
Informal votes	1,441		Informal	1.06%	– 0.29%
Summary of votes by party
Party	Primary votes	%	Swing	Seats	Change
Liberal Union	171,993	51.58%	+ 0.17%	20	– 4
Labor	153,034	45.90%	– 0.88%	26	+ 10
Independent	8,405	2.52%	+ 0.71%	0	± 0
Total	333,432			46	

This is a list of House of Assembly results for the 1915 South Australian state election. Each district elected multiple members.

Every voter would receive a ballot paper where they would cast 2 or 3 votes for different candidates. In electorates that were not unopposed, the 2 or 3 candidates with the most votes would be elected.

== Results by electoral district ==
=== Adelaide ===
1915 South Australian state election: Adelaide
Party	Candidate	Votes	%	±%
Labor	Bill Denny (elected)	unopposed		
Labor	John Gunn (elected)	unopposed		
Labor	Reginald Blundell (elected)	unopposed		

=== Albert ===
1915 South Australian state election: Albert
Party	Candidate	Votes	%	±%
Liberal Union	William Angus (elected)	2,861	32.0	
Liberal Union	R. A. O'Connor (elected)	2,787	31.1	
Labor	Gwynfred Oram	2,019	22.6	
Independent	Walter Campbell	1,285	14.4	
Total formal votes		8,952; 4,930 ballots	98.9	
Informal votes		57	1.1	
Turnout		4,987	65.9	
Party total votes
Liberal Union		5,648	63.1	
Labor		2,019	22.6	
Independent	Walter Campbell	1,285	14.4	

=== Alexandra ===
1915 South Australian state election: Alexandra
Party	Candidate	Votes	%	±%
Liberal Union	George Ritchie (elected)	5,250	19.9	
Liberal Union	George Laffer (elected)	5,172	19.6	
Liberal Union	Alexander McDonald (elected)	5,076	19.3	
Labor	Thomas Grealy	3,693	14.0	
Labor	Bryan Blundell	3,591	13.6	
Labor	Stanley Herring	3,570	13.6	
Total formal votes		26,352; 8,929 ballots	98.9	
Informal votes		98	1.1	
Turnout		9,027	75.2	
Party total votes
Liberal Union		15,498	58.8	
Labor		10,854	41.2	

=== Barossa ===
1915 South Australian state election: Barossa
Party	Candidate	Votes	%	±%
Liberal Union	Richard Butler (elected)	5,082	18.3	
Liberal Union	William Hague (elected)	5,001	18.0	
Labor	Ephraim Coombe (elected)	4,856	17.5	
Liberal Union	Samuel Rudall	4,802	17.3	
Labor	Norman Makin	4,182	15.0	
Labor	Max Riedel	3,900	14.0	
Total formal votes		27,823; 9,491 ballots	99.5	
Informal votes		47	0.5	
Turnout		9,538	81.0	
Party total votes
Liberal Union		14,885	53.5	
Labor		12,938	46.5	

=== Burra Burra ===
1915 South Australian state election: Burra Burra
Party	Candidate	Votes	%	±%
Liberal Union	John Pick (elected)	5,882	19.5	
Liberal Union	William Miller (elected)	5,842	19.4	
Liberal Union	Laurence O'Loughlin (elected)	5,770	19.1	
Labor	Edward Pearce	4,387	14.5	
Labor	Arrol Penglase	4,195	13.9	
Labor	Even George	4,105	13.6	
Total formal votes		30,181; 10,170 ballots	99.1	
Informal votes		95	0.9	
Turnout		10,265	76.8	
Party total votes
Liberal Union		17,494	58.0	
Labor		12,687	42.0	

=== East Torrens ===
1915 South Australian state election: East Torrens
Party	Candidate	Votes	%	±%
Labor	Frederick Coneybeer (elected)	11,672	23.6	
Labor	Lionel Hill (elected)	10,466	21.2	
Labor	John Southwood (elected)	10,367	21.0	
Liberal Union	Nathaniel Hargrave	7,262	14.7	
Liberal Union	William Dring	7,117	14.4	
Independent	Peter Addison	2,528	5.1	
Total formal votes		49,412; 18,210 ballots	97.9	
Informal votes		382	2.1	
Turnout		18,592	71.6	
Party total votes
Labor		32,505	65.8	
Liberal Union		14,379	29.1	
Independent	Peter Addison	2,528	5.1	

=== Flinders ===
1915 South Australian state election: Flinders
Party	Candidate	Votes	%	±%
Liberal Union	James Moseley (elected)	3,387	33.3	
Liberal Union	John Travers (elected)	3,329	32.7	
Labor	John Cronin	1,757	17.3	
Labor	Frank Davies	1,697	16.7	
Total formal votes		10,170; 5,135 ballots	99.0	
Informal votes		53	1.0	
Turnout		5,188	70.8	
Party total votes
Liberal Union		6,716	66.0	
Labor		3,454	34.0	

=== Murray ===
1915 South Australian state election: Murray
Party	Candidate	Votes	%	±%
Liberal Union	Harry Young (elected)	4,511	19.3	
Labor	Maurice Parish (elected)	4,271	18.2	
Labor	George Dunn (elected)	4,051	17.3	
Liberal Union	Hermann Homburg	3,979	17.0	
Liberal Union	Friedrich Pflaum	3,659	15.6	
Independent	David Wellington	1,958	8.4	
Independent	Archibald Duncan	1,004	4.3	
Total formal votes		23,433; 9,019 ballots	99.3	
Informal votes		66	0.7	
Turnout		9,085	78.3	
Party total votes
Liberal Union		12,149	51.8	
Labor		8,322	35.5	
Independent	David Wellington	1,958	8.4	
Independent	Archibald Duncan	1,004	4.3	

=== Newcastle ===
1915 South Australian state election: Newcastle
Party	Candidate	Votes	%	±%
Labor	Thomas Butterfield (elected)	2,417	28.4	
Labor	Andrew Kirkpatrick (elected)	2,399	28.2	
Liberal Union	Thomas Burgoyne	1,870	22.0	
Liberal Union	Edward Twopeny	1,832	21.5	
Total formal votes		8,518; 4,776 ballots	98.4	
Informal votes		71	1.6	
Turnout		4,847	72.7	
Party total votes
Labor		4,816	56.5	
Liberal Union		3,702	46.5	

=== North Adelaide ===
1915 South Australian state election: North Adelaide
Party	Candidate	Votes	%	±%
Labor	Edward Anstey (elected)	6,186	28.7	
Labor	William Ponder (elected)	5,997	27.8	
Liberal Union	Lewis Cohen	4,766	22.1	
Liberal Union	Thomas Crase	4,638	21.5	
Total formal votes		21,587; 10,930 ballots	98.9	
Informal votes		121	1.1	
Turnout		11,051	73.0	
Party total votes
Labor		12,183	56.4	
Liberal Union		9,404	43.6	

=== Port Adelaide ===
1915 South Australian state election: Port Adelaide
Party	Candidate	Votes	%	±%
Labor	Ivor MacGillivray (elected)	unopposed		
Labor	John Price (elected)	unopposed		

=== Port Pirie ===
1915 South Australian state election: Port Pirie
Party	Candidate	Votes	%	±%
Labor	William Cole (elected)	unopposed		
Labor	Harry Jackson (elected)	unopposed		

=== Stanley ===
1915 South Australian state election: Stanley
Party	Candidate	Votes	%	±%
Liberal Union	Robert Nicholls (elected)	4,530	38.4	
Liberal Union	Henry Barwell (elected)	4,426	37.6	
Labor	John Fitzgerald	2,828	24.0	
Total formal votes		11,784; 7,126 ballots	99.4	
Informal votes		46	0.6	
Turnout		7,172	79.4	
Party total votes
Liberal Union		8,956	76.0	
Labor		2,828	24.0	

=== Sturt ===
1915 South Australian state election: Sturt
Party	Candidate	Votes	%	±%
Labor	Crawford Vaughan (elected)	11,534	18.5	
Labor	Thomas Smeaton (elected)	11,502	18.5	
Labor	Thomas Ryan (elected)	11,364	18.2	
Liberal Union	Angas Parsons	9,869	15.8	
Liberal Union	Herbert Hudd	9,183	14.7	
Liberal Union	Noel Webb	8,842	14.2	
Total formal votes		62,294; 21,119 ballots	98.9	
Informal votes		238	1.1	
Turnout		21,357	73.3	
Party total votes
Labor		34,400	55.2	
Liberal Union		27,894	44.8	

=== Victoria ===
1915 South Australian state election: Victoria
Party	Candidate	Votes	%	±%
Labor	Peter Reidy (elected)	5,650	26.3	
Labor	Clarence Goode (elected)	5,585	26.0	
Liberal Union	George Bodey	5,142	23.9	
Liberal Union	Archibald Peake	5,116	23.8	
Total formal votes		21,493; 10,806 ballots	99.3	
Informal votes		73	0.7	
Turnout		10,879	80.8	
Party total votes
Labor		11,235	52.3	
Liberal Union		10,258	47.7	

=== Wallaroo ===
1915 South Australian state election: Wallaroo
Party	Candidate	Votes	%	±%
Labor	John Verran (elected)	unopposed		
Labor	John Herbert (elected)	unopposed		

=== West Torrens ===
1915 South Australian state election: West Torrens
Party	Candidate	Votes	%	±%
Labor	Henry Chesson (elected)	unopposed		
Labor	Thompson Green (elected)	unopposed		

=== Wooroora ===
1915 South Australian state election: Wooroora
Party	Candidate	Votes	%	±%
Liberal Union	Richard Butler (elected)	5,717	26.4	
Liberal Union	David James (elected)	5,585	25.8	
Liberal Union	Albert Robinson (elected)	5,467	25.3	
Labor	Frederick Birrell	3,254	15.0	
Independent	Herbert Tuck	1,630	7.5	
Total formal votes		21,653; 8,857 ballots	99.6	
Informal votes		39	0.4	
Turnout		8,896	79.6	
Party total votes
Liberal Union		16,769	77.4	
Labor		3,254	15.0	
Independent	Herbert Tuck	1,630	7.5	

=== Yorke Peninsula ===
1915 South Australian state election: Yorke Peninsula
Party	Candidate	Votes	%	±%
Liberal Union	Henry Tossell (elected)	4,124	42.2	
Liberal Union	Peter Allen (elected)	4,117	42.1	
Labor	Robert Kinnane	1,539	15.7	
Total formal votes		9,780; 5,585 ballots	99.0	
Informal votes		55	1.0	
Turnout		5,640	77.6	
Party total votes
Liberal Union		8,241	84.3	
Labor		1,539	15.7	

== See also ==
- Candidates of the 1915 South Australian state election
- Members of the South Australian House of Assembly, 1915–1918
