= Candidates of the 1918 South Australian state election =

List of candidates of 1918 South Australian state election

1918 South Australian state election
← 1915	6 April 1918	1921 →

All 46 seats in the South Australian House of Assembly 24 seats needed for a majority
	First party	Second party	Third party
Leader	Archibald Peake	Andrew Kirkpatrick	Crawford Vaughan
Party	Liberal Union	Labor	National Labor
Leader's seat	Alexandra	Upper house	Sturt
Seats before	20	26	0
Seats won	22	17	6
Seat change	+2	-9	+6
Popular vote	27.94%	44.54%	18.66%
Premier before election
Archibald Peake
Liberal Union
Elected Premier
Archibald Peake
Liberal Union

This is a list of candidates of the 1918 South Australian state election.

== Retiring MPs ==
=== Liberal ===
- David James (Wooroora) – lost preselection
- James Howe MLC (Northern District) – retired

=== Independent ===
- Clarence Goode (Victoria) – retired

There had also been two resignations in the months leading up to the election which had remained unfilled. Sturt National MP Thomas Ryan had resigned on 16 November 1917 following his election to the Parliament of Victoria at the 1917 Victorian election, while Liberal Midland District MLC Edward Lucas had resigned on 1 February 1918 following his appointment as Agent-General for South Australia. In addition, Newcastle Labor MP Andrew Kirkpatrick shifted houses, contesting the Legislative Council in Central District No. 1.

== House of Assembly ==
Sitting members are shown in bold text. Successful candidates are marked with an asterisk.

Electorate	Labor candidates	Liberal candidates	National candidates	FSA candidates	Independent candidates
Adelaide (3)	**Bill Denny***; John Gunn*; **Bert Edwards***		**Reginald Blundell**; W. J. Stephens		Selina Siggins
Albert (2)	C. H. L. Benson; R. E. Downie	**William Angus***; **R. A. O'Connor***		W. D. Cowley; E. G. Butler	
Alexandra (3)	M. J. E. Hunt; William Nicholls; Walter Lodge	**Archibald Peake***; **George Laffer***; **George Ritchie***			Walter Furler
Barossa (3)	G. Cooke; Tom Edwards; Moses Gabb	**Richard Butler***; **Henry Crosby***; **William Hague***			E. E. Craig (FPCP) ^{[1]} H. G. Crittenden (FPCP) ^{[1]} T. W. Martin (FPCP) ^{[1]} J. M. Scott
Burra Burra (3)	Harry Buxton*; Mick O'Halloran*; Len Wilcot	Samuel Dickson; George Jenkins*		**William Miller**; **Laurence O'Loughlin**; **John Pick**	
East Torrens (3)	Martin Collaton; Herbert George; T. W. Grealy	**Walter Hamilton***	**Frederick Coneybeer***; **J. A. Southwood***		R. G. Hawkes; A. L. Calder; Victor Wilson
Flinders (2)		**James Moseley***		John Chapman*	Samuel Lindsay (ST); **John Travers**
Murray (3)	Sid O'Flaherty*; Frank Staniford; S. E. Willsmore	Angas Parsons*; **H. D. Young***	**George Dunn**		**Maurice Parish**; J. L. Atkinson; J. E. Kelly
Newcastle (2)	Thomas Butterfield*; William Harvey*	Robert Thompson; **Edward Twopeny**			
North Adelaide (2)	C. O. Bennett; F. T. Martin		**E. A. Anstey***; **W. D. Ponder***		
Port Adelaide (2)	**John Price***; J. S. Verran*		**Ivor MacGillivray**; Richard Gully		Allen Martin; Alfred Formby
Port Pirie (2)	Lionel Hill*; John Fitzgerald*		**William Cole**; **Harry Jackson**		
Stanley (2)	James Scales	**Henry Barwell***; **Robert Nicholls***		M. L. McCormack	
Sturt (3)	Frank McCabe; A. G. Rankin; Tom Howard	Edward Vardon*	Arthur Blackburn*; **T. H. Smeaton***		**Crawford Vaughan**; Jeanne Young; Charles Newling; G. W. Illingworth
Victoria (2)	Charles McHugh; Stanley Whitford	Vernon Petherick*	**Peter Reidy***		H. L. Kennedy
Wallaroo (2)	John Pedler*; Robert Richards*		**J. F. Herbert**; **John Verran**		
West Torrens (2)	Alfred Blackwell*; John McInnes*		**Henry Chesson**; **Thompson Green**		
Wooroora (3)	William Milne; Frank Nieass; Allan Robertson*	**Richard Layton Butler**; James McLachlan*; **Albert Robinson***		Samuel Dennison	
Yorke Peninsula (2)		**Peter Allen***; **Henry Tossell***			R. A. Ford; R. D. Hogarth

== Legislative Council ==
Sitting members are shown in bold text. Successful candidates are marked with an asterisk.

Electorate	Labor candidates	Liberal candidates	National candidates	Farmers and Settlers candidates	Independent candidates
Central District No. 1 (2)	Tom Gluyas*; Andrew Kirkpatrick*		**John Vaughan**; **J. P. Wilson**		
Central District No. 2 (2)	L. C. Hunkin; Frederick Ward	Henry Tassie*	**W. H. Harvey***		**A. W. Styles**
Northern District (2)		**William Morrow***; J. E. H. Winnall		W. G. Mills*	
Midland District (3)		**David Gordon***; Walter Gordon Duncan*; **Thomas Pascoe***			
Southern District (2)	James Black; H. A. E. R. Pengilly	**John Cowan***; **Lancelot Stirling***			

== Notes ==
^{1} The three Barossa candidates were candidates of the Farmers and Producers Country Party (FPCP or F&PCP).
