= Candidates of the 1915 South Australian state election =

This is a list of candidates of the 1915 South Australian state election.

== Retiring MPs ==
=== Liberal Union ===
- Oscar Duhst (Wooroora) – lost preselection
- Percy Heggaton (Alexandra) – retired
- Robert Homburg (Burra Burra) – retired
- Frederick William Young (Wooroora) – appointed Agent General in London

== House of Assembly ==
Sitting members are shown in bold text. Successful candidates are marked with an asterisk.

Electorate	Labor candidates	Liberal candidates	Independent candidates
Adelaide (3)	**Reginald Blundell***; **Bill Denny***; John Gunn*		
Albert (2)	Gwynfred Oram	**William Angus***; Richard Alfred O'Connor*	Walter Campbell
Alexandra (3)	B. W. P. Blundell; T. W. Grealy; S. H. Herring	**George Laffer***; **Alexander McDonald***; **George Ritchie***	
Barossa (3)	Ephraim Coombe*; Norman Makin; M. O. Reidel	**Richard Butler***; **William Hague***; **Samuel Rudall**	
Burra Burra (3)	Even George; E. J. Pearce; A. T. Penglase	**William Miller***; **Laurence O'Loughlin***; John Pick*	
East Torrens (3)	**Frederick Coneybeer***; **John Albert Southwood***; Lionel Hill*	N. J. Hargrave; W. H. H. Dring	Peter Addison
Flinders (2)	J. J. Cronin; F. H. Davies	James Moseley*; John Travers*	
Murray (3)	George Dunn*; Maurice Parish*	**Hermann Homburg**; **Friedrich Pflaum**; **Harry Dove Young***	Archibald Duncan; D. J. Wellington
Newcastle (2)	Thomas Butterfield*; Andrew Kirkpatrick*	**Thomas Burgoyne**; Edward Twopeny	
North Adelaide (2)	**Edward Alfred Anstey***; **William David Ponder***	Lewis Cohen; Thomas Crase	
Port Adelaide (2)	**Ivor MacGillivray***; John Price*		
Port Pirie (2)	**William Cole***; **Harry Jackson***		
Stanley (2)	John Fitzgerald	Henry Barwell*; Robert Nicholls*	
Sturt (3)	Thomas Ryan*; **Thomas Hyland Smeaton***; **Crawford Vaughan***	**Herbert Hudd**; **Angas Parsons**; N. A. Webb	
Victoria (2)	**Clarence Goode***; Peter Reidy*	**George Bodey**; **Archibald Peake**	
Wallaroo (2)	**John Verran***; **John Frederick Herbert***		
West Torrens (2)	**Henry Chesson***; **Thompson Green***		
Wooroora (3)	Frederick Birrell	Richard Layton Butler*; **David James***; Albert Robinson*	H. M. Tuck
Yorke Peninsula (2)	R. J. J. Kinnane	Peter Allen*; Henry Tossell*	

== Legislative Council ==
Only two Legislative Council seats were up for election at the 1915 general election: one in each of Central District No. 1 and No. 2.

Sitting members are shown in bold text. Successful candidates are marked with an asterisk.

Electorate	Labor candidates	Liberal candidates
Central District No. 1	John Carr*	
Central District No. 2	William Humphrey Harvey	John Herbert Cooke*
