= Candidates of the 1912 South Australian state election =

This is a list of candidates of the 1912 South Australian state election.

== Retiring MPs ==
=== Labor ===
- Alfred Edwin Winter (Wallaroo)

=== Liberal Union ===
- John Warren MLC (North Eastern District)

== House of Assembly ==
Sitting members are shown in bold text. Successful candidates are marked with an asterisk.

Electorate	Labor candidates	Liberal candidates	Independent candidates
Adelaide (4)	**Edward Alfred Anstey***; **Reginald Blundell***; **Bill Denny***; **William David Ponder***	E. A. Johnson; P. F. Kiley; A. J. McLachlan; William Frederick Stock	James Lesser
Alexandra (4)	E. S. Bates; **Thomas Ryan** ^{[1]}	**William Blacker***; **Percy Heggaton***; **Alexander McDonald***; **George Ritchie***	
Barossa (3)		**Richard Butler***; William Hague*; **Samuel Rudall***	**Ephraim Coombe**; Michael Lynch
Burra Burra (3)	Patrick Callery; **John Newland**	Robert Homburg, junior* **William Miller***; **Laurence O'Loughlin***	
Flinders (3)	Thomas Butterfield; **James O'Loghlin**	**Thomas Burgoyne***; **James Moseley***; John Travers*	Thomas Ryan ^{[1]} W. B. Stacey
Murray (3)	F. W. Lehmann; William Perry; Frederick Ward	**Hermann Homburg***; **William Jamieson***; **Friedrich Pflaum***	
Port Adelaide (3)	**Henry Chesson***; **Thompson Green***; **Ivor MacGillivray***	H. J. Cowell; W. H. H. Dring; E. A. Farquhar	
Stanley (3)	**William Cole***; **Clarence Goode***; **Harry Jackson***	Henry Barwell; A. E. McDonald; William Morrow	
Torrens (5)	**Frederick Coneybeer***; **George Dankel**; **Thomas Hyland Smeaton***; E. J. Thomas; **Crawford Vaughan***	Herbert Hudd*; George Laffer; Angas Parsons*; N. A. Webb; R. V. Wilson	
Victoria and Albert (3)	F. G. Ayres; **Donald Campbell**; **William Senior**	William Angus*; George Bodey*; **Archibald Peake***	
Wallaroo (3)	John Frederick Herbert*; John Albert Southwood*; **John Verran***	**Peter Allen**; R. A. Ford; W. R. Stephenson	
Wooroora (3)	E. E. Thamm	Oscar Duhst*; **David James***; **Frederick William Young***	Jonathan Jackett

== Legislative Council ==
Sitting members are shown in bold text. Successful candidates are marked with an asterisk.

Electorate	Labor candidates	Liberal candidates
Central District (3)	James Jelley*; **Frederick Samuel Wallis***; John Vaughan*	John Herbert Cooke; **Charles Morris**; **Beaumont Arnold Moulden**
Midland District (2)		Walter Hannaford*; **Edward Lucas***
Northern District (2)	A. F. Goode	**John George Bice***; **John Lewis***
Southern District (2)	A. T. Grosvenor; J. C. Joy	**John Downer***; **Alfred von Doussa***

== Notes ==
^{1} Confusingly, there were two different candidates by the name of Thomas Ryan at this election. Thomas Ryan, an incumbent MHA for Torrens, contested and lost Alexandra. The unsuccessful independent candidate for Flinders of the same name was a farmer and grazier from Uroonda.
