= Members of the South Australian House of Assembly, 1915–1918 =

This is a list of members of the South Australian House of Assembly from 1915 to 1918, as elected at the 1915 state election:

Name	Party	Electorate	Term of office
Peter Allen	Liberal	Yorke Peninsula	1902–1912, 1915–1925
William Angus	Liberal	Albert	1912–1921
Edward Alfred Anstey	Labor/National ^{[2]}	North Adelaide	1908–1921
Henry Barwell	Liberal	Stanley	1915–1925
Reginald Blundell	Labor/National ^{[2]}	Adelaide	1907–1918
Hon Sir Richard Butler	Liberal	Barossa	1890–1924
Richard Layton Butler	Liberal	Wooroora	1915–1918, 1921–1938
Thomas Butterfield ^{[3]}	Labor	Newcastle	1915–1917, 1918–1933
Henry Chesson	Labor/National ^{[2]}	West Torrens	1905–1918
William Cole	Labor/National ^{[2]}	Port Pirie	1910–1918
Ephraim Coombe ^{[6]}	Labor	Barossa	1901–1912, 1915–1917
Frederick Coneybeer	Labor/National ^{[2]}	East Torrens	1893–1921, 1924–1930
Henry Crosby ^{[6]}	Liberal	Barossa	1917–1924, 1924–1930, 1933–1938
Bill Denny	Labor	Adelaide	1900–1905, 1906–1933
George Dunn	Labor/National ^{[2]}	Murray	1915–1918
Bert Edwards ^{[4]}	Labor	Adelaide	1917–1931
Clarence Goode	Labor/National/Independent ^{[2]}^{[9]}	Victoria	1905–1918
Thompson Green	Labor/National ^{[2]}	West Torrens	1910–1918
John Gunn ^{[4]}	Labor	Adelaide	1915–1917, 1918–1926
William Hague	Liberal	Barossa	1912–1924
Walter Hamilton ^{[5]}	Liberal	East Torrens	1917–1924, 1925–1930, 1933–1938
John Frederick Herbert	Labor/National ^{[2]}	Wallaroo	1912–1918
Lionel Hill ^{[5]}	Labor	East Torrens	1915–1917, 1918–1933
Harry Jackson	Labor/National ^{[2]}	Port Pirie	1906–1918
David James	Liberal	Wooroora	1902–1918
Hon Andrew Kirkpatrick	Labor	Newcastle	1915–1918
George Laffer	Liberal	Alexandra	1913–1933
Ivor MacGillivray	Labor/National ^{[2]}	Port Adelaide	1893–1918
Alexander McDonald ^{[1]}	Liberal	Alexandra	1887–1915
William Miller	Liberal/Farmers and Settlers ^{[11]}	Burra Burra	1902–1918
James Moseley	Liberal	Flinders	1910–1933
Robert Nicholls	Liberal	Stanley	1915–1956
Richard Alfred O'Connor	Liberal	Albert	1915–1921
Hon Laurence O'Loughlin	Liberal/Farmers and Settlers ^{[11]}	Burra Burra	1890–1918
Maurice Parish	Labor/National/Independent ^{[2]}^{[10]}	Murray	1915–1918
John Pick	Liberal/Farmers and Settlers ^{[11]}	Burra Burra	1915–1918
William David Ponder	Labor/National ^{[2]}	North Adelaide	1905–1921
Peter Reidy	Labor/National ^{[2]}	Victoria	1915–1932
Albert Robinson	Liberal	Wooroora	1915–1924, 1934–1943
Thomas Ryan ^{[7]}	Labor/National ^{[2]}	Sturt	1909–1912, 1915–1917
Thomas Hyland Smeaton	Labor/National ^{[2]}	Sturt	1905–1921
John Albert Southwood	Labor/National ^{[2]}	East Torrens	1912–1921
Hon Archibald Peake ^{[1]}	Liberal	Alexandra	1897–1915, 1915–1920
John Price	Labor	Port Adelaide	1915–1925
George Ritchie	Liberal	Alexandra	1902–1922
Henry Tossell	Liberal	Yorke Peninsula	1915–1930
John Travers	Liberal/Independent ^{[8]}	Flinders	1906–1910, 1912–1918
Edward Twopeny ^{[3]}	Liberal	Newcastle	1917–1918
Crawford Vaughan	Labor/National/Independent ^{[2]}^{[12]}	Sturt	1905–1918
Hon John Verran	Labor/National ^{[2]}	Wallaroo	1901–1918
Harry Dove Young	Liberal	Murray	1912–1927

^{1} Alexandra Liberal MHA Alexander McDonald resigned on 17 May 1915. Liberal candidate Archibald Peake won the resulting by-election on 19 June.
^{2} In the February 1917 Labor split, the official Labor Party expelled Premier Crawford Vaughan and his supporters, including a majority of their members of the House of Assembly, over their support for conscription in World War I. The expelled MPs formed the National Labor Party in March; the party was renamed the National Party in June.
^{3} Newcastle Labor MHA Thomas Butterfield resigned on 21 March 1917. Liberal candidate Edward Twopeny won the resulting by-election on 12 May.
^{4} Adelaide Labor MHA John Gunn resigned on 21 March 1917 to contest the 1917 federal election. Labor candidate Bert Edwards won the resulting by-election on 12 May.
^{5} East Torrens Labor MHA Lionel Hill resigned on 21 March 1917 to contest the 1917 federal election. Liberal candidate Walter Hamilton won the resulting by-election on 21 May.
^{6} Barossa Labor MHA Ephraim Coombe died on 5 April 1917. Liberal candidate Henry Crosby won the resulting by-election on 2 June.
^{7} Sturt National MHA Thomas Ryan resigned on 16 November 1917 following his election to the Parliament of Victoria at the 1917 Victorian election. No by-election was held due to the proximity of the 1918 election.
^{8} John Travers resigned from the Liberal Union in December 1917 and served out his term as an independent.
^{9} Victoria MHA Clarence Goode resigned from the National Party in January 1918; he later clarified that he had only resigned from the parliamentary National Party. The coalition agreement between the National Party and Liberal Union for the 1921 election had only granted the National Party one seat for its two members, and Goode opted to retire to give Peter Reidy a clear run rather than recontest as an independent.
^{10} Murray MHA Maurice Parish resigned from the National Party in January 1918 and sat as an independent for the remainder of his term.
^{11} The three Liberal MHAs for Burra Burra, William Miller, Laurence O'Loughlin and John Pick, collectively defected to the Farmers and Settlers Association in February 1918.
^{12} In March 1918, Sturt MHA Crawford Vaughan resigned as National Party leader, withdrew from preselection, and announced his intention to contest the 1918 election as an independent.
