= Members of the South Australian House of Assembly, 1912–1915 =

This is a list of members of the South Australian House of Assembly from 1912 to 1915, as elected at the 1912 state election:

Name	Party	Electorate	Term of office
William Angus	Liberal	Victoria and Albert	1912–1921
Edward Alfred Anstey	Labor	Adelaide	1908–1921
George Bodey	Liberal	Victoria and Albert	1912–1915
William Blacker ^{[2]}	Liberal	Alexandra	1892–1913
Reginald Blundell	Labor	Adelaide	1907–1918
Thomas Burgoyne	Liberal	Flinders	1884–1915
Hon Richard Butler	Liberal	Barossa	1890–1924
Henry Chesson	Labor	Port Adelaide	1905–1918
William Cole	Labor	Stanley	1910–1918
Frederick Coneybeer	Labor	Torrens	1893–1921, 1924–1930
Bill Denny	Labor	Adelaide	1900–1905, 1906–1933
Oscar Duhst	Liberal	Wooroora	1912–1915
Clarence Goode	Labor	Stanley	1905–1918
Thompson Green	Labor	Port Adelaide	1910–1918
William Hague	Liberal	Barossa	1912–1924
Percy Heggaton	Liberal	Alexandra	1906–1915, 1923–1938
John Frederick Herbert	Labor	Wallaroo	1912–1918
Hon Hermann Homburg	Liberal	Murray	1906–1915, 1927–1930
Robert Homburg, junior	Liberal	Burra Burra	1912–1915
Herbert Hudd	Liberal	Torrens	1912–1915, 1920–1938, 1941–1948
David James	Liberal	Wooroora	1902–1918
William Jamieson ^{[1]}	Liberal	Murray	1901–1902, 1905–1912
George Laffer ^{[2]}	Liberal	Alexandra	1913–1933
Ivor MacGillivray	Labor	Port Adelaide	1893–1918
Alexander McDonald	Liberal	Alexandra	1887–1915
William Miller	Liberal	Burra Burra	1902–1918
James Moseley	Liberal	Flinders	1910–1933
Hon Laurence O'Loughlin	Liberal	Burra Burra	1890–1918
Angas Parsons	Liberal	Torrens	1912–1915, 1918–1921
Hon Archibald Peake	Liberal	Victoria and Albert	1897–1915, 1915–1920
Friedrich Pflaum	Liberal	Murray	1902–1915
William David Ponder	Labor	Adelaide	1905–1921
George Ritchie	Liberal	Alexandra	1902–1922
Samuel Rudall	Liberal	Barossa	1906–1915
Thomas Hyland Smeaton	Labor	Torrens	1905–1921
John Albert Southwood	Labor	Wallaroo	1912–1921
John Travers	Liberal	Flinders	1906–1910, 1912–1918
Harry Jackson	Labor	Stanley	1906–1918
Crawford Vaughan	Labor	Torrens	1905–1918
John Verran	Labor	Wallaroo	1901–1918
Harry Dove Young ^{[1]}	Liberal	Murray	1912–1927
Frederick William Young	Liberal	Wooroora	1902–1905, 1909–1915

^{1} Murray Liberal MHA William Jamieson died on 15 October 1912. Liberal candidate Harry Dove Young won the resulting by-election on 23 November.
^{2} Alexandra Liberal MHA William Blacker died on 22 November 1913. Liberal candidate George Laffer won the resulting by-election on 20 December.
