= Vaughan ministry =

The Vaughan ministry was the 49th ministry of the Government of South Australia, led by Crawford Vaughan. It commenced on 3 April 1915, following the victory of Vaughan's Labor Party at the 1915 state election. In February 1917, Vaughan, his entire ministry, and their backbench supporters, were expelled from the Labor Party in the 1917 Labor split and formed the National Labor Party; however, Vaughan continued in office leading a minority government with the support of the opposition conservative Liberal Federation. It was succeeded by the third Peake ministry on 14 July 1917, when the Liberal Federation withdrew its support and brought down the Vaughan government. In August, one month into the replacement ministry, the National Labor Party would subsequently join the Peake ministry as the junior coalition partner of the Liberal Federation, with three members of the Vaughan ministry (Alfred William Styles, Harry Jackson and Reginald Blundell) serving under their former opponents.

Office	Minister
Premier; Treasurer; Minister of Education	Crawford Vaughan MHA
Chief Secretary	Alfred William Styles MLC
Attorney-General	John Vaughan MLC
Commissioner of Crown Lands and Immigration; Minister of Agriculture	Clarence Goode MHA
Commissioner of Public Works	Harry Jackson MHA
Minister of Industry; Minister of Mines; Minister of Marine	Reginald Blundell MHA
