= Members of the South Australian House of Assembly, 1918–1921 =

This is a list of members of the South Australian House of Assembly from 1918 to 1921, as elected at the 1918 state election:

Name	Party	Electorate	Term of office
Peter Allen	Liberal	Yorke Peninsula	1902–1912, 1915–1925
William Angus	Liberal	Albert	1912–1921
Edward Alfred Anstey	National	North Adelaide	1908–1921
Henry Barwell	Liberal	Stanley	1915–1925
Harry Buxton	Labor	Burra Burra	1918–1921
Arthur Blackburn	National	Sturt	1918–1921
Alfred Blackwell	Labor	West Torrens	1918–1938
Hon Sir Richard Butler	Liberal	Barossa	1890–1924
Thomas Butterfield	Labor	Newcastle	1915–1917, 1918–1933
John Chapman	Farmers and Settlers	Flinders	1918–1924
Frederick Coneybeer	National	East Torrens	1893–1921, 1924–1930
Henry Crosby	Liberal	Barossa	1917–1924, 1924–1930, 1933–1938
Bill Denny	Labor	Adelaide	1900–1905, 1906–1933
Bert Edwards	Labor	Adelaide	1917–1931
John Fitzgerald	Labor	Port Pirie	1918–1936
John Gunn	Labor	Adelaide	1915–1917, 1918–1926
William Hague	Liberal	Barossa	1912–1924
Walter Hamilton	Liberal	East Torrens	1917–1924, 1925–1930, 1933–1938
William Harvey	Labor	Newcastle	1918–1933
Lionel Hill	Labor	Port Pirie	1915–1917, 1918–1933
Herbert Hudd ^{[1]}	Liberal	Alexandra	1912–1915, 1920–1938, 1941–1948
George Jenkins	Liberal	Burra Burra	1918–1924, 1927–1930, 1933–1956
George Laffer	Liberal	Alexandra	1913–1933
John McInnes	Labor	West Torrens	1918–1950
James McLachlan	Liberal	Wooroora	1918–1930
James Moseley	Liberal	Flinders	1910–1933
Robert Nicholls	Liberal	Stanley	1915–1956
Richard Alfred O'Connor	Liberal	Albert	1915–1921
Sid O'Flaherty	Labor	Murray	1918–1921
Mick O'Halloran	Labor	Burra Burra	1918–1921, 1924–1927, 1938–1960
Angas Parsons ^{[3]}	Liberal	Murray	1912–1915, 1918–1921
Hon Archibald Peake ^{[1]}	Liberal	Alexandra	1897–1915, 1915–1920
John Pedler	Labor	Wallaroo	1918–1938
Vernon Petherick	Liberal	Victoria	1918–1924, 1941–1945
William David Ponder	National	North Adelaide	1905–1921
John Price	Labor	Port Adelaide	1915–1925
Peter Reidy	National	Victoria	1915–1932
Robert Richards	Labor	Wallaroo	1918–1949
George Ritchie	Liberal	Alexandra	1902–1922
Allan Robertson	Labor	Wooroora	1918–1921, 1924–1927
Albert Robinson	Liberal	Wooroora	1915–1924, 1934–1943
Thomas Hyland Smeaton	National	Sturt	1905–1921
John Albert Southwood	National/Independent Labor ^{[2]}	East Torrens	1912–1921
Henry Tossell	Liberal	Yorke Peninsula	1915–1930
Edward Vardon ^{[4]}	Liberal	Sturt	1918–1924
John Stanley Verran	Labor	Port Adelaide	1918–1924, 1925–1927
Harry Dove Young	Liberal	Murray	1912–1927

^{1} Alexandra Liberal MHA Archibald Peake died on 6 April 1920. Liberal candidate Herbert Hudd won the resulting by-election on 12 June.
^{2} East Torrens MHA John Albert Southwood resigned from the National Party in 1920 and served out his term as an independent Labor member.
^{3} Murray Liberal MHA Angas Parsons resigned on 5 January 1921. No by-election was held due to the proximity of the 1921 state election.
^{4} Sturt Liberal MHA Edward Vardon resigned on 15 February 1921 in order to nominate for a casual vacancy in the Australian Senate. No by-election was held due to the proximity of the 1921 state election.
