= Members of the South Australian Legislative Council, 1921–1924 =

This is a list of members of the South Australian Legislative Council from 1921 to 1924.

Name	District	Party	Term expiry	Time in office
John George Bice ^{[4]}	Northern	Liberal ^{[3]}	1927	1894–1923
John Carr	Central No. 1	Labor	1927	1915–1929
John Herbert Cooke	Central No. 2	Liberal ^{[3]}	1927	1915–1933
John Cowan	Southern	Liberal ^{[3]}	1924	1910–1944
Walter Gordon Duncan	Midland	Liberal ^{[3]}	1924	1918–1962
Tom Gluyas	Central No. 1	Labor	1924	1918–1931
David Gordon	Midland	Liberal ^{[3]}	1924	1913–1944
Walter Hannaford	Midland	Liberal ^{[3]}	1927	1912–1941
William Humphrey Harvey	Central No. 2	National Party/Liberal ^{[1]} ^{[3]}	1924	1915–1935
James Jelley	Central No. 1	Labor	1927	1912–1933
Andrew Kirkpatrick	Central No. 1	Labor	1924	1891–1897, 1900–1909, 1918–1928
John Lewis ^{[2]}	Northern	Liberal ^{[3]}	1927	1898–1923
Thomas McCallum	Southern	Liberal ^{[3]}	1927	1920–1938
Robert Thomson Melrose	Southern	Liberal ^{[3]}	1927	1921–1927
William George Mills	Northern	Farmers and Settlers/ Country Party ^{[5]}	1924	1918–1933
William Morrow	Northern	Liberal ^{[3]}	1924	1915–1934
Thomas Pascoe	Midland	Liberal ^{[3]}	1927	1900–1933
George Henry Prosser	Central No. 2	Liberal ^{[3]}	1927	1921–1933
Sir Lancelot Stirling	Southern	Liberal ^{[3]}	1924	1891–1932
Henry Tassie	Central No. 2	Liberal ^{[3]}	1924	1918–1938

^{1} The sole remaining member of the National Party in the Legislative Council, Central No. 2 District MLC William Humphrey Harvey, joined the Liberal Union in July 1921.
^{2} Liberal Union MLC John Lewis died on 25 August 1923. The vacancy was filled simultaneously with the 5 April 1924 elections for the other class of seats, with Lewis' successor serving a half-term.
^{3} The Liberal Union and the National Party merged in October 1923 to form the Liberal Federation.
^{4} Liberal Federation MLC John George Bice died on 9 November 1923. The vacancy was filled simultaneously with the 5 April 1924 elections for the other class of seats, with Bice's successor serving a half-term.
^{5} The parliamentary wing of the Farmers and Settlers Association had been referred to by a variety of labels prior to this term of parliament, and had contested the 1921 election independently of the National-dominated "Progressive Country Party". After the 1921 election, the party formally adopted the "Country Party" name, consistent with their federal counterparts.
