= Members of the South Australian Legislative Council, 1918–1921 =

This is a list of members of the South Australian Legislative Council from 1918 to 1921.

Name	District	Party	Term expiry	Time in office
John George Bice	Northern	Liberal Union	1921	1894–1923
Joseph Botterill ^{[2]}	Southern	Liberal Union	1921	1915–1920
John Carr	Central No. 1	Labor	1921	1915–1929
John Herbert Cooke	Central No. 2	Liberal Union	1921	1915–1933
John Cowan	Southern	Liberal Union	1924	1910–1944
Walter Gordon Duncan	Midland	Liberal Union	1924	1918–1962
Tom Gluyas	Central No. 1	Labor	1924	1918–1931
David Gordon	Midland	Liberal Union	1924	1913–1944
Walter Hannaford	Midland	Liberal Union	1921	1912–1941
William Humphrey Harvey	Central No. 2	National Party	1924	1915–1935
James Jelley	Central No. 1	Labor	1921	1912–1933
Andrew Kirkpatrick	Central No. 1	Labor	1924	1891–1897, 1900–1909, 1918–1928
John Lewis	Northern	Liberal Union	1921	1898–1923
Thomas McCallum ^{[2]}	Southern	Liberal Union	1921	1920–1938
William George Mills	Northern	Farmers and Settlers	1924	1918–1933
William Morrow	Northern	Liberal Union	1924	1915–1934
Thomas Pascoe	Midland	Liberal Union	1921	1900–1933
Sir Lancelot Stirling	Southern	Liberal Union	1924	1891–1932
Henry Tassie	Central No. 2	Liberal Union	1924	1918–1938
Alfred von Doussa	Southern	Liberal Union/Independent ^{[3]}	1921	1901–1921
Frederick Samuel Wallis	Central No. 2	Labor/Independent ^{[1]}	1921	1907–1921

^{1} Central No. 2 District MLC Frederick Samuel Wallis was expelled from the Labor Party in September 1918. He served out the remainder of his term as an independent.
^{2} Liberal Union MLC Joseph Botterill died on 17 August 1920. Thomas McCallum won the resulting by-election on 9 October.
^{3} In August 1920, the Liberal Union refused to accept the preselection nomination of Southern District MLC Alfred von Doussa for the 1921 election after he refused to sign a pledge that he would not contest the election if he lost preselection. Following his preselection loss, von Doussa acted as an independent for the remainder of his term while running for re-election.
