= Charles Morris (Australian politician) =

Australian politician

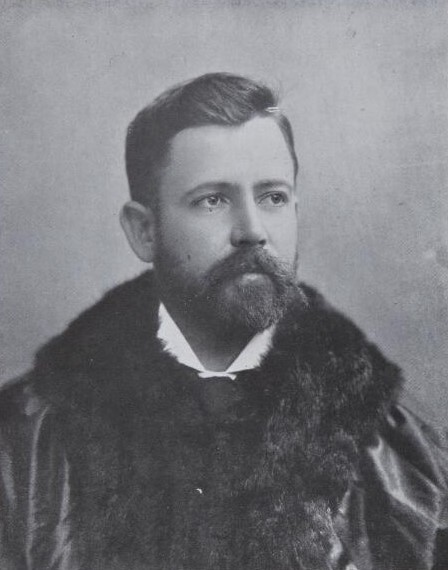

Charles Richard Morris (13 March 1863 – 4 January 1918) was a timber merchant and politician in South Australia.

== History ==
Morris was born at Noarlunga the eldest son of C. E. Morris, and moved when very young to Underdale, where he received his education. At the age of 13 he started working for Robin & Hack (Theophilus Robin and Theodore Hack), timber merchants of Dale Street, Port Adelaide, and 10 years later, with Theophilus John Walter (1859 – 2 December 1946) as "Walter & Morris", took over the business, which survived and thrived.

== Politics ==
His first public office was in 1899, when he was elected Councillor for Cleave Ward in the municipality of Port Adelaide, a position he held for four years. He was an Alderman of Port Adelaide for eight years and Mayor four times. He was a candidate for the House of Assembly seat of Port Adelaide in 1910, but was defeated by Thompson Green. In August 1911, he was elected to the Legislative Council as a Liberal Union candidate for the Central district, filling the seat made vacant by the death of Theodore Bruce, but failed re-election at the following general election in February 1912.

== Other interests ==
He represented Port Adelaide on the Fire Brigade Board. He was a keen athlete, and actively concerned in all the athletic clubs in his district. He was a prominent bowler; he founded the Port Adelaide District Cricket Club, and was both its President and the club's delegate to the South Australian Cricket Association. for many years, and for two years was Chairman of the S.A.C.A. He was President of the sailing club and the Orpheus Society, a committeeman of the local institute, and a member of the School Board of Advice and the Adelaide Hospital, and a deacon of the Port Adelaide Congregational Church.

== Family ==
He was married and had a home at Victoria Avenue, Unley Park. He left a family consisting of a wife, three sons, and six daughters.

He died at a private hospital after suffering from typhoid and pneumonia.
