= Selina Siggins =

Australian political activist

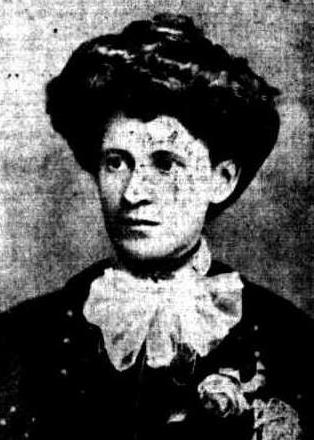
- Siggins c. 1905
- Born: Selina Sarah Elizabeth Charters; 12 May 1878 near Hill End, New South Wales, Australia
- Died: 30 November 1964 (aged 86); Ashbury, New South Wales, Australia
- Other name: Selina Anderson
- Political party: Independent (1903, 1918); Labor (c. 1906–1909); Country (1922)
- Spouse: Christopher Siggins (m. 1908; died 1946)

Selina Sarah Elizabeth Siggins (née Charters, previously Anderson; 12 May 1878 – 30 November 1964) was an Australian political activist who became the first woman to stand for the Australian House of Representatives. She ran as an independent at the 1903 federal election, the first at which women were eligible to be candidates. Although she spent most of her life in New South Wales, in 1918 she also became one of the first two women to stand for the Parliament of South Australia. Siggins was introduced to politics through her involvement in the labour movement, and initially supported the Labor Party. She eventually fell out with the party over its refusal to endorse her as a candidate. Her final run for parliament came at the 1922 federal election, where she became the first woman to stand for the Country Party.

== Early life ==
Siggins was born on 12 May 1878 near the small mining town of Hill End, New South Wales. She was the only child of Sarah Charlotte (née Lawrence) and James Charters. Her father, "an elderly, illiterate labourer" born in Ireland, died the year after her birth. Her English-born mother remarried in 1880 to Jerome Anderson, and her daughter took his surname. Siggins attended the Tambaroora Public School, and in 1893 won a prize for an essay about the local district. Little else is known about her childhood, but by 1903 she was living in a boardinghouse in Elizabeth Street, Sydney, and working as an artist and photographic retoucher.

== Public life ==
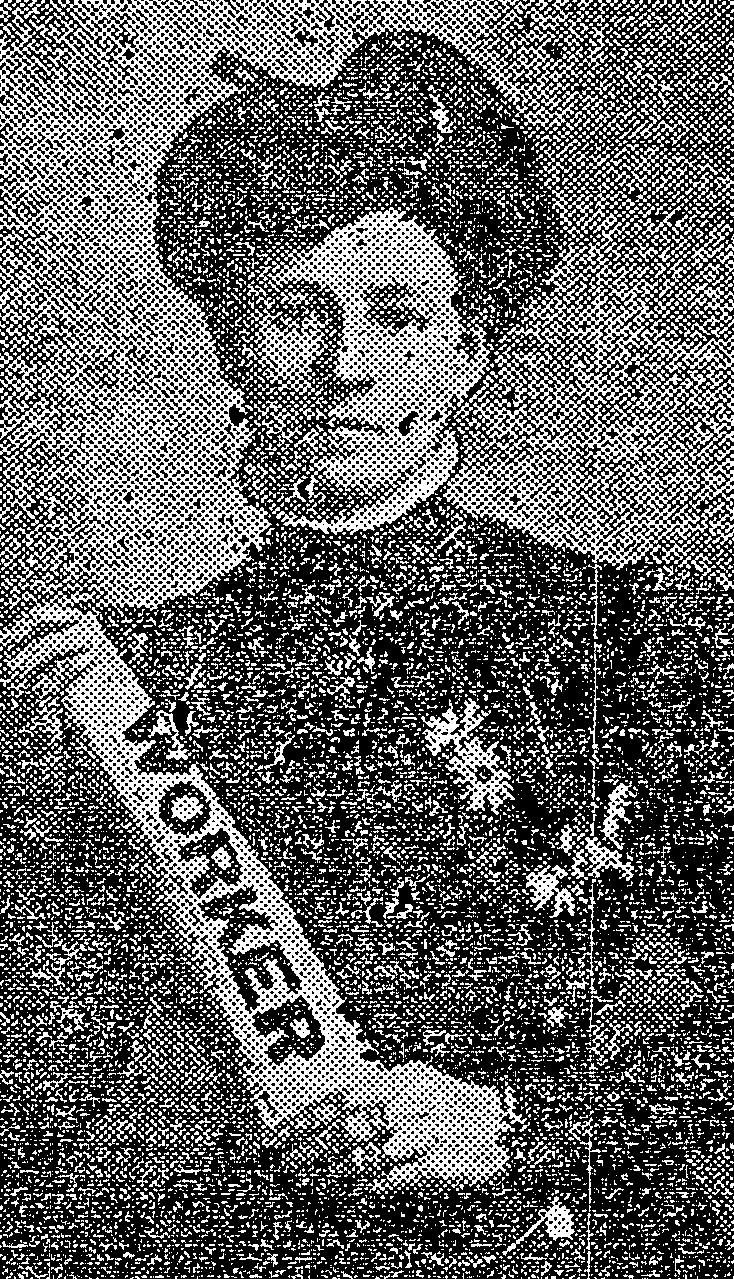
Photograph of Siggins published by the Maoriland Worker, 1911

After moving to Sydney, Siggins became involved in the local labour movement. She served as the president of the Pyrmont branch of the Women's Political Labor League, and was one of the founders of the Cardboard Box Makers' Union, serving as its inaugural secretary. She was later chosen by the Shop Assistants' Union as one of its delegates to the Sydney Labor Council, where she served on the organising committee and the anti-sweating committee. In May 1904, Siggins became the secretary of the Anti-Chinese and Asiatic League, which opposed "Chinese immigration and industry". At a January 1906 meeting of the Labor Council, she successfully moved that the council petition the government to oppose any relaxation of the Immigration Restriction Act 1901. She stated that Chinese immigration constituted "a standing menace to the status of Australian citizenhood" and was likely to spread leprosy.

In June 1904, Siggins launched a defamation suit against Henry Beech, a storekeeper in her home town of Hill End. She sought damages of £1,000, claiming he had made statements implying she was "a woman of libidinous and licentious nature and disposition". Her suit was unsuccessful. By 1906, Siggins had been elected to the state executive of the Australian Labor Party. She campaigned for Labor candidates at the 1907 state election, but later distanced herself from the party. The Daily Telegraph speculated in July 1909 that she had "deserted" the Labor Party, and she subsequently told the paper that she had felt she had been treated unfairly by the central executive.

In December 1909, Siggins and her husband moved to New Zealand. She lived in Wellington for a period, working as an organiser for the Amalgamated Society of Merchant Assistants, and was interviewed by the Maoriland Worker about the differences between the labour movements in Australia and New Zealand. In 1911, Siggins was recruited by the Grey Industrial and Political Council to work as an organiser in the Grey District, on the West Coast of the South Island. She campaigned for Paddy Webb, the Socialist candidate in Grey, at the 1911 general election. Siggins eventually returned to Australia, living in Adelaide for several years before settling in Wellington, New South Wales. In 1922, she became the first woman delegate at the annual conference of the Farmers' and Settlers' Association of New South Wales.

=== Political candidacies ===
I feel I am called upon to do something to better the conditions of womankind, and if elected I shall make the very best of the opportunities that a position in the Senate will give. I mean to direct my opportunities principally to having woman placed on an equality with man. That is to say, if she is able to do the same kind of work, with the same ability, she should get the same pay. That's what I think, and that you may call the chief plank of my platform.

— Daily Telegraph interview, 1 September 1903

Women were given the right to stand for federal parliament by the Commonwealth Franchise Act 1902. Four female candidates subsequently nominated for the 1903 federal election, three of whom – Vida Goldstein, Nellie Martel, and Mary Moore-Bentley – stood for the Senate. Siggins originally announced that she too would stand for the Senate, but later decided to run for the House of Representatives. In an interview with The Daily Telegraph, she said she could be described as a "moderate protectionist" and "independent labour" candidate. Running in the Division of Dalley, in Sydney's eastern suburbs, Siggins won 17.7 percent of the vote to finish runner-up to William Wilks of the Free Trade Party. She thereby saved her £25 deposit. Libby Stewart of the Museum of Australian Democracy has observed that "although the efforts of Goldstein to be elected to Federal Parliament a further four times are well documented [...] the later lives of the other three women, who were without doubt female leaders of their time, are largely unknown to most Australians".

Prior to the 1906 federal election, Siggins announced that she would stand for the Division of East Sydney, opposing former prime minister and Anti-Socialist leader George Reid. She hoped to secure the endorsement of the Labor Party, but was unsuccessful. Siggins instead ran as an independent, describing herself as "the progressive and democratic candidate". However, she never formally nominated for the election. According to The Sydney Morning Herald, she failed to lodge her deposit by the deadline, although she told the Evening News that her withdrawal was due to ill health. In 1909, Siggins announced her intention to stand for the Division of Robertson at the next election. She again hoped to secure the endorsement of the Labor Party, but the party had already preselected a candidate, William Johnson. She requested that a second ballot be held, but the party refused and she announced that she would run as an independent. In the end, no election was called until early the following year, by which point she was living in New Zealand.

At the 1918 South Australian state election, Siggins became one of the first two women to stand for the Parliament of South Australia, along with Jeanne Young. She ran for the House of Assembly as an independent, standing in the three-member Adelaide constituency. Siggins "attacked both the Labor Party and socialism" during the campaign. Her platform included "more than fifty" different policies, including free schoolbooks, compulsory voting, proportional representation, benefits for returned servicemen, child endowment for large families, and price controls for food. She polled just over two percent of the vote, and did not retain her deposit. Siggins made her final run for parliament at the 1922 federal election. At the election, she stood as one of two Country Party candidates in the Division of Calare, the first woman to stand for the Country Party at a federal election. She polled only 1.7 percent of the vote, but her preferences aided in the election of the Nationalist candidate Neville Howse over Labor's Thomas Lavelle.

== Personal life ==
Siggins' husband was an Irish-born widower, Christopher Hewitt Siggins, whom she married on 1 January 1908 in Wellington, New South Wales. The couple had no children. They eventually retired to Sydney, owning a property near Canterbury Park Racecourse where they had stables and trained racehorses. Siggins applied to the Australian Jockey Club to become a registered trainer, but was refused a licence. She was widowed in 1946, and died in Ashbury on 30 November 1964, aged 86. She was buried at the Field of Mars Cemetery.
