= Howard Vaughan =

Australian politician (1879–1955)

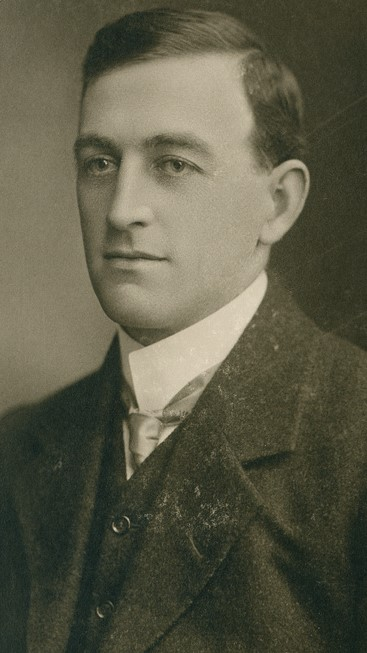
Howard Vaughan, dated 1910

John Howard Vaughan CBE (14 November 1879 – 21 August 1955) was an Australian politician. Born in Norwood, Adelaide, he was a member of the South Australian Legislative Council from 1912 to 1918, representing the United Labor Party (1912–1917) and the National Party (1917–1918). He served as the Attorney-General of South Australia from 1915 to 1917.

In the 1917 Labor split, Vaughan was expelled along with his brother, Premier Crawford Vaughan, and joined the new National Party. Upon the defeat of the Vaughan ministry in July 1917, Vaughan did not nominate for a position in the new coalition ministry of Archibald Peake, and enlisted to serve in World War I. He was controversially opposed at the 1918 election while away on active service, and being unable to campaign was defeated by Labor candidate Tom Gluyas.

Vaughan was appointed a Commander of the Order of the British Empire in 1932. He died in Adelaide on 21 August 1955, at the age of 75, and is buried at Centennial Park Cemetery in Pasadena, Adelaide.

Political offices
Preceded by Herbert Angas Parsons	Attorney-General of South Australia; 1915–1917	Succeeded by Henry Barwell
South Australian Legislative Council
Preceded by Charles Richard Morris; Beaumont Arnold Moulden	Member for Central District; 1912–1915	Succeeded by Electorate abolished
Preceded by Electorate created	Member for Central District No. 1; 1915–1918	Succeeded by Tom Gluyas
