= Thomas McCallum =

Thomas McCallum (17 March 1860 – 20 April 1938) was a politician in South Australia.

== History ==
McCallum was born at Langhorne's Creek a son of John McCallum of "Ballindown", and was educated at Glenelg Grammar School for a year, then under a private tutor at McGrath's Flat. He lived in the Meningie district since childhood, and his holding at McGraths Flat was one of the biggest in the district, with a 15 miles (24 km) frontage along the Coorong, carrying 6,000 sheep and many cattle.

He was in 1888 elected a foundation member of the District Council of Meningie, and was associated with the council ever since, and for many years was chairman. He joined the Liberal Union when it was formed around 1912, and was in 1920 selected to stand for the Southern district seat of the Legislative Council, made vacant by the resignation (and subsequent death) of Joseph Botterill. He enjoyed good health, and was one of the most reliable members of the council.

McCallum was president of the Lake Albert Agricultural and Horticultural Society for several years. He died alone of a heart attack while driving his car from his homestead at McGrath's Flat to a council meeting at Meningie. The car came to rest against a post, only slightly damaged. He was a bachelor and had no family.
