= Maurice Parish =

Australian politician (1890–1980)

Maurice William Parish (29 December 1890 – 17 January 1980) was an Australian politician who represented the South Australian House of Assembly multi-member seat of Murray from 1915 to 1918. He was elected at as a United Labor Party member, left the party to join the National Party in the 1917 Labor split, and became an independent in 1918.

Parish was born in Melbourne, with his family moving to Murray Bridge at the age of four. He was a building contractor before entering politics, and was elected as a District Council of Mobilong councillor in 1914. He was subsequently chairman of the Mobilong council from 1915 until 1924, and then the first mayor of the Corporate Town of Murray Bridge from 1924 until 1927, later returning as mayor in the 1930s.

He was elected to the House of Assembly at the 1915 state election for the United Labor Party in the seat of Murray. Parish was the youngest person to win a seat in the House at the time of his election, having been only 24. He left the Labor Party in the 1917 Labor split, casting the deciding vote of the Murray Bridge branch to leave the party in late March, some weeks after the other departing MPs had left, and joined the new National Party. The National Party contested the 1918 election in coalition with the conservative Liberal Union, and Parish was unsuccessful in gaining preselection for the coalition ticket. He immediately resigned from the National Party and contested the election as an independent, but was unsuccessful.

In 1934, Parish established The Murray Valley Standard newspaper at Murray Bridge after purchasing a local printing business. He wrote his own regular column in the paper from 1947. He sold the publication to his editor in 1950, but continued to contribute to the newspaper as a travel writer thereafter. Having been readmitted to the Labor Party in 1929, he later unsuccessfully contested the 1947 state election for the conservative Liberal and Country League.
