= John Pick (politician) =

Australian politician

John Edward Pick (16 November 1869 – 21 March 1951) was an Australian pastoralist and politician. He represented the South Australian House of Assembly multi-member seat of Burra Burra from 1915 to 1918. He was sometimes referred to as "the grand old man of the north-west".

Pick was born near Mount Gambier. In 1892, his father took up Braemar Station, sixty miles north-east of Burra, and Pick took over ownership of the property in 1902. In 1909, he sold Braemar and purchased Arcoona Station, and in 1920 sold Arcoona and purchased Coondambo Station, which he owned until his death. He was a vice-president of the Stockowners' Association of South Australia from 1925 to 1930, and was patron of the Port Augusta Racing Club from 1914 until his death.

Pick was elected to the House of Assembly at the 1915 state election for the conservative Liberal Union, succeeding the retired Robert Homburg, junior. In February 1918, less than two months before the 1918 election, Pick, along with the two other Liberal members for Burra Burra, William Miller and Laurence O'Loughlin, defected to the rival Farmers and Settlers Association. The three members cited a disputed preselection plebiscite which they argued had been designed to defeat O'Loughlin, and neglect of rural regions by the Liberal Union as reasons for their defection. All three were defeated at the election, losing to two Labor candidates and a Liberal.

In 1926, he was selected as one of five members of a Royal Commission into the pastoral industry in South Australia. The commission reported in 1927, making recommendations on the classification of pastoral land, the length of leases for pastoral land, processes for resumption or surrender of leases, the settlement of land that remained unoccupied, and a range of other issues related to the industry. The report formed the basis of subsequent legislative reforms, and upon his death the Transcontinental described Pick's contribution as "outstanding work", with his "wide experience and practical knowledge...a great advantage".

Pick died suddenly at Coondambo Station in 1951, at the age of 81. His funeral was held in Adelaide. The Port Augusta Town Council and Port Augusta Racing Club both held minutes' silence to acknowledge his death.

Parliament of South Australia
Preceded by Robert Homburg, junior	Member for Burra Burra; 1915–1918; Served alongside: William Miller, Laurence O'Loughlin	Succeeded by Harry Buxton; George Jenkins; Mick O'Halloran
