= Adelaide Trades Hall =

Trades hall building in Adelaide, South Australia

Coordinates: 34.9358°S 138.5896°E

The Adelaide Trades Hall is the Trades Hall building in the South Australian city of Adelaide established in 1896.

It is the location of the United Trades and Labour Council of South Australia, also known as SA Unions. It is located at 11-16 South Terrace, Adelaide.

== See also ==
- Australian labour movement
