= Friedrich Pflaum =

Australian politician (1846–1923)

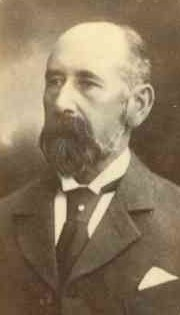

Friedrich Jacob Theodor Pflaum (17 July 1846 – 28 July 1923) was an Australian politician who represented the South Australian House of Assembly multi-member seat of Murray from 1902 to 1915, representing the Australasian National League from 1905 to 1910 and the Liberal Union from 1910 to 1915.

Pflaum was a member of the Destitute Board and the board of enquiry which looked into the nurses' dispute at the Destitute Asylum and exonerated Nurse Dunstan.
