= George Bodey =

Australian politician

George Bodey (died 6 June 1930) was an Australian politician who represented the South Australian House of Assembly multi-member seat of Victoria and Albert from 1912 to 1915 for the Liberal Union.
