= 1910 South Australian state election =

- 2 April 1910

All 42 seats in the South Australian House of Assembly 22 seats were needed for a majority
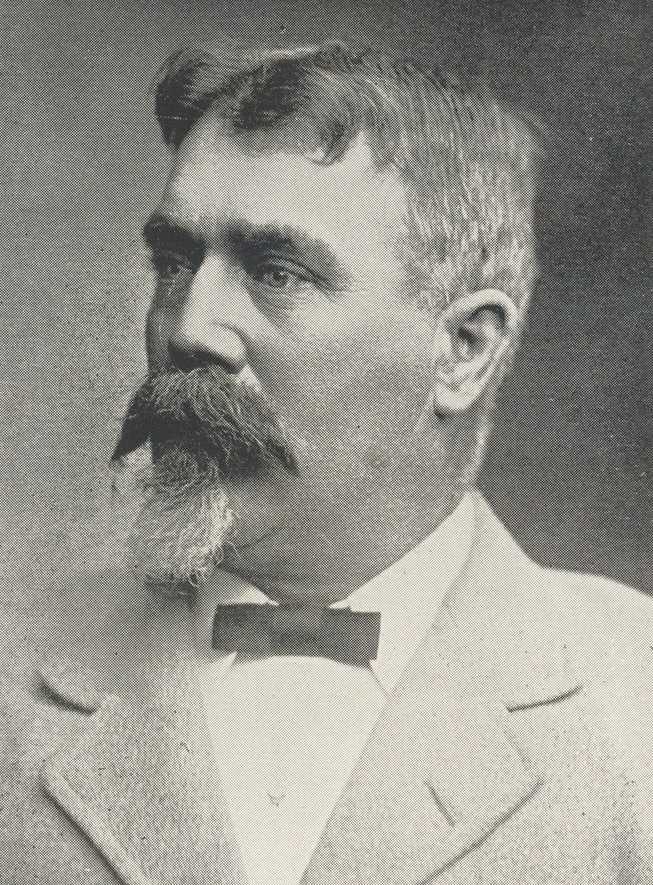

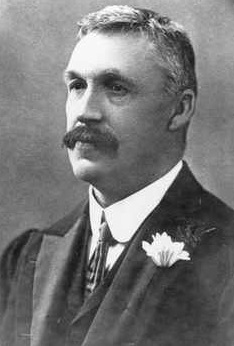
	First party	Second party
Leader	John Verran	Archibald Peake
Party	United Labor	Liberal Union
Leader since	5 June 1909	5 June 1909
Leader's seat	Wallaroo	Victoria and Albert
Last election	20 seats	Did not exist
Seats won	22 seats	20 seats
Seat change	▲2	▲20
Popular vote	197,935	199,915
Percentage	49.10%	49.59%
Swing	▲14.28	▲49.59
- Results by electoral district for the House of Assembly
Premier before election
Archibald Peake
Liberal Union
Elected Premier
John Verran
United Labor

State elections were held in South Australia on 2 April 1910. All 42 seats in the South Australian House of Assembly were up for election. The incumbent Liberal and Democratic Union (LDU) government led by Premier of South Australia Archibald Peake was defeated by the United Labor Party (ULP) led by John Verran. Each of the 13 districts elected multiple members, with voters casting multiple votes. The Peake LDU minority government had replaced the Price ULP/LDU coalition government in June 1909. The 1910 election was the first to result in a South Australian majority government. This came two weeks after the election of a first majority in either house in the Parliament of Australia at the 1910 federal election, also for Labor. Though a South Australian majority was won, the ULP did not take office until after the new lower house first met.

== Background ==
Following the election, the LDU merged with the two independent conservative parties – the Australasian National League (ANL, formerly National Defence League (NDL)) and the Farmers and Producers Political Union (FPPU) – to become the Liberal Union (LU). The parties readily approved the merger, however, the LDU which salvaged the fewest of their principles from the merger were more hesitant. Peake persuaded a party conference that 'the day of the middle party is passed', and approved the merger by just one vote. The LU was affiliated with the federal Commonwealth Liberal Party (CLP).

The two-seat multi-member district of Northern Territory was abolished in 1911, reducing the House of Assembly to 40 seats.

== Results ==
House of Assembly (FPTP) — Turnout 71.0% (Non-CV)
Party	Primary votes	%	Swing	Seats	+/-
Liberal Union	199,915	49.59	+49.59	20	▲20
United Labor	197,935	49.10	+14.28	22	▲2
Independent	5,309	1.32	-15.13	0	▼1
Formal votes					
Informal votes		1.6%			
Total	403,159	71.0%	42		

The three anti-Labor parties - the LDU, the ANL and the FPPU - endorsed a shared "Liberal" slate of candidates in all but three Assembly seats and the Council, though they would not formally merge as the Liberal Union until late 1910, months after the election. The listed "Liberal" figure is for the three parties combined.

== See also ==
- Members of the South Australian House of Assembly, 1910-1912
- Members of the South Australian Legislative Council, 1910–1912
