= Tom Gluyas =

Australian politician

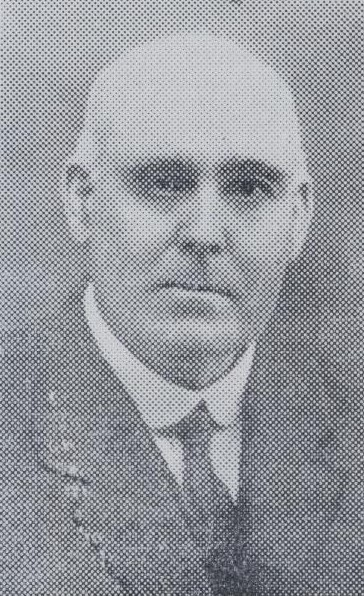
- Born: 1864; Moonta Mines, South Australia, Australia
- Died: 3 September 1931 (aged 66–67)
- Occupation: politician
- Years active: 1918–1931
- Known for: Legislative Council for Central District No.1
- Political party: Labor
- Spouse: Kate Sidwell Sedgman (m. 1889)
- Father: William Gluyas

Thomas Gluyas (1864 – 3 September 1931) was a politician in the State of South Australia.

== History ==
Thomas Gluyas was born at Moonta Mines the fourth son of William Gluyas, a leading pitman. In 1875, the family started farming at Agery, and four years later moved to Port Augusta, where in 1880 Thomas started working for the railways. He moved with the railways workshops to Quorn where they remained for 20 years. In 1903 he was transferred to the Islington Railway Workshops.

== Politics ==
Tom was a member of the Quorn council for two years. All his life he was involved in union activity. He was a member of the Amalgamated Society of Engineers, and president of the Adelaide branch. He represented the Society for many years on the Trades and Labor Council, and at Labor Party conferences. In 1918 as a Labor candidate he was elected to the Legislative Council for Central District No.1, and remained a member until his death, when he was praised for his bluff good humour and loyalty.

== Family ==
He married Kate Sidwell Sedgman (ca.1865 – 8 August 1928) of Quorn, South Australia on 29 January 1889; they later lived on Seaview road, Henley Beach South.
