= Jeanne Young =

Australian women's and political activist

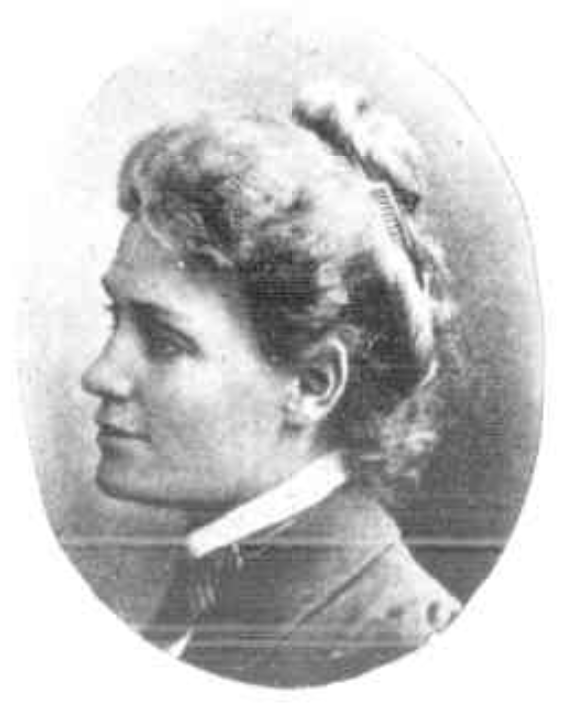
- Born: Sarah Jane Young; 1 July 1866; Unley, Adelaide, South Australia
- Died: 11 April 1955 (aged 88); Rose Park, Adelaide, South Australia
- Known for: Reform
- Political party: Women's Non-Party Association
- Other political affiliations: Women's Representation League
- Spouse: Alfred Howard Young
- Honours: Officer of the Order of the British Empire (OBE)

Sarah Jane Young OBE (née Forster; known as Jeanne Forster Young; 1 July 1866 – 11 April 1955) was an Australian political reformer.

Born at Unley in Adelaide to smith John Forster and Sarah Jane, née Jarvis, she received a private education before becoming a governess and piano teacher; she also attempted freelance journalism, and lost the sight in one eye in an accident with a horse and trap. She married journalist Alfred Howard Young at her father's home in East Adelaide on 23 January 1889. She became secretary of the Effective Voting League in 1897 as Jeanne Forster Young and named Catherine Spence as an inspiration.

Young and Spence campaigned in Sydney in 1900 for the Hare-Spence method to be used for federal elections, staying with Rose Scott, and after Spence's death Young completed and published Spence's unfinished autobiography. Young joined the Australian Red Cross Society, the South Australian Soldiers' Fund and the Wattle Day League (WDL) during World War I and directed a three-day exhibition for the WDL's motor ambulance committee in 1916. She left her husband, who had disagreed with her fervent nationalism, in 1917, although he continued to lend her his support. A justice of the peace from 1917, she was secretary of the Women's Representation League in 1918 and was an active member of the board of the Public Library, Museum and Art Gallery from 1916, finally retiring (when almost blind) in 1928. In 1930 she founded the Proportional Representation Group.

After reuniting, Young and her husband travelled abroad in 1932, searching in Switzerland for a cure for Jeanne's blindness. She campaigned for Effective Voting in England and attended a Commonwealth League conference for the Women's Non-Party Association, a South Australian organisation of which she had been a founding member in 1909. Her husband died in 1936. Jeanne published a biography, Catherine Helen Spence, in 1937. As an independent proportional representation advocate, she unsuccessfully ran for the House of Assembly in 1918 and 1938 and for the Senate in 1937. Appointed Officer of the Order of the British Empire in 1938, Young published her last brochure in 1945. She was granted life membership of the Justices Association in 1947, in recognition of her 30 years' service in the community as a justice of the peace.

Young died at Rose Park in 1955.
