= 1918 South Australian state election =

- 6 April 1918

All 46 seats in the South Australian House of Assembly 24 seats were needed for a majority
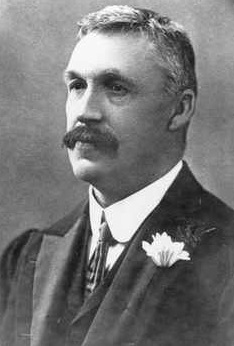

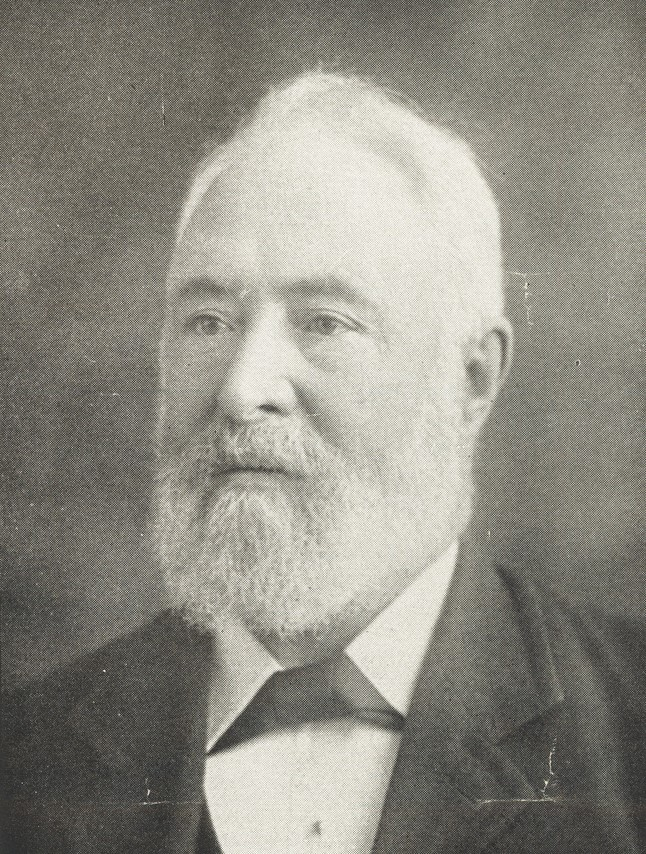

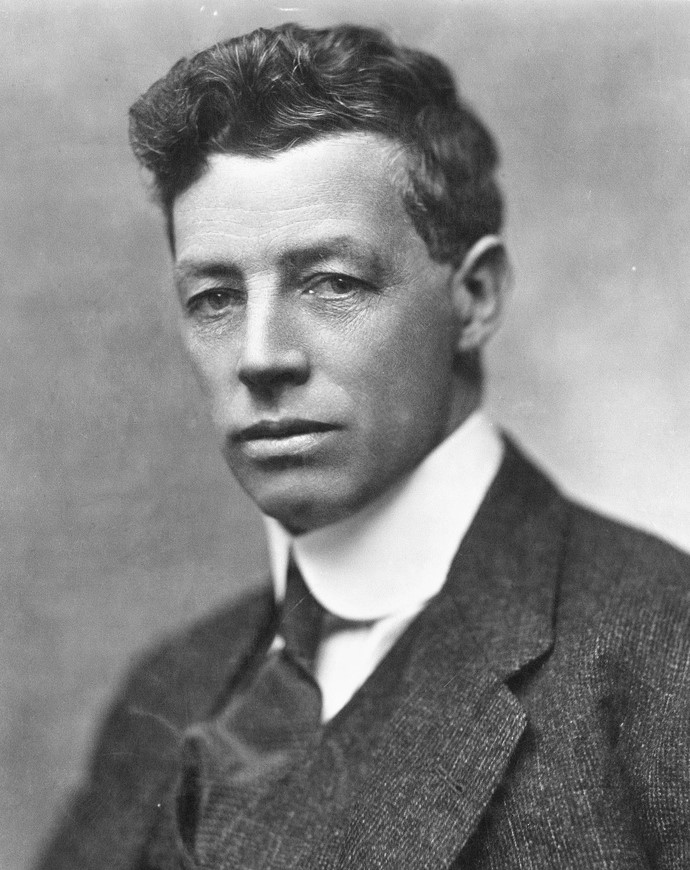
	First party	Second party	Third party
Leader	Archibald Peake	Andrew Kirkpatrick	Crawford Vaughan
Party	Liberal Union	Labor	National Labor
Leader since	5 June 1909	14 July 1917
Leader's seat	Alexandra	Upper house	Sturt
Last election	20 seats	26 seats
Seats won	22 seats	17 seats	6 seats
Seat change	▲2	▼9
Percentage	27.94%	44.54%	18.66%
Swing	▼23.64	▼1.36
Premier before election
Archibald Peake
Liberal Union
Elected Premier
Archibald Peake
Liberal Union

State elections were held in South Australia on 6 April 1918. All 46 seats in the South Australian House of Assembly were up for election. The incumbent Liberal Union government led by Premier of South Australia Archibald Peake defeated the opposition Australian Labor Party led by Leader of the Opposition Andrew Kirkpatrick. Each district elected multiple members, with voters casting multiple votes.

The 1918 election was the first at which any women stood as candidates. Selina Siggins (Adelaide) and Jeanne Young (Sturt) both ran unsuccessfully as independents.

== Background ==
The Crawford Vaughan Labor government fell in July 1917 due to the Australian Labor Party split of 1916 on conscription, and was replaced by a Peake Liberal minority government. This was replaced by the Peake Liberal-National Labor coalition government in August 1917. Peake initially formed a ministry of liberals, but after complaints from National Labor who had supported him in the confidence motion, he included three National Labor members. Crawford Vaughan, National Labor leader, did not take a place in the ministry. The Liberal and National Labor parties went to the election in coalition.

The first new parties emerged since the two-party system was introduced from the 1910 state election − the Farmers and Settlers Association (F&S), Single Tax (ST) and the Farmers and Producers Country Party (FPCP). The United Labor Party was renamed to the South Australian Branch of the Australian Labor Party on 14 September 1917.

== Results ==
Arrangement of the House of Assembly after the 1918 state election.

South Australian state election, 6 April 1918 House of Assembly << 1915–1921 >>
Enrolled voters	258,712				
Votes cast	132,321		Turnout	51.89%	– 23.06%
Informal votes	1,922		Informal	1.45%	+0.38%
Summary of votes by party
Party	Primary votes	%	Swing	Seats	Change
Labor	144,204	44.54%	– 1.36%	17	– 9
Liberal Union	90,453	27.94%	– 23.64%	22	+ 2
National Party	60,417	18.66%	*	6	+ 6
Farmers and Settlers	13,844	4.28%	*	1	+ 1
Single Tax League	1,398	0.43%	*	0	± 0
Farmers and Producers	1,033	0.32%	*	0	± 0
Independent	12,432	3.84%	+ 1.32%	0	± 0
Total	132,321			46	

== See also ==
- Results of the 1918 South Australian state election (House of Assembly)
- Candidates of the South Australian state election, 1918
- Members of the South Australian House of Assembly, 1918-1921
- Members of the South Australian Legislative Council, 1918-1921
