= Henry Chesson =

Australian politician

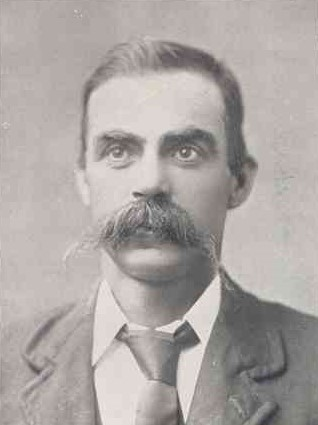

Member of the South Australian Parliament for Port Adelaide
- In office 1905–1915
- Preceded by: Thomas Henry Brooker
- Succeeded by: Ivor MacGillivray; John Price

Member of Parliament for West Torrens
- In office 1915–1918
- Preceded by: District recreated
- Succeeded by: Alfred Blackwell; John McInnes

Personal details
- Party: Labor Party; National Party

Henry Chesson (15 September 1862 – 12 July 1948) was an Australian politician. He was a member of the South Australian House of Assembly from 1905 to 1918, representing Port Adelaide until 1915 and West Torrens thereafter. He represented the United Labor Party until being expelled in the 1917 Labor split, and thereafter represented the splinter National Party until his defeat at the 1918 election.

Chesson was born in Adelaide and was educated at Grote Street Model School and Pulteney Street School. He began working in a boot factory at the age of twelve, and left school at fifteen to become a mason and bricklayer. He worked in Melbourne from 1885 to 1892 before returning to Adelaide. He was president and financial secretary of the South Australian Masons and Bricklayers' Society, and was their delegate to the Trades and Labour Council, of which he was also president and vice-president. Chesson also served on the Adelaide Trades Hall management committee and Eight Hours Committee, and as president and vice-president of the United Labor Party.

Chesson was elected to the House of Assembly at the 1905 election in the seat of Port Adelaide, shifting to the new seat of West Torrens following an electoral redistribution in 1915. He was chairman of committees from 1915 to 1918. Chesson left the Labor Party for the new National Party in the 1917 Labor split over conscription. He was defeated by a Labor candidate when he ran for re-election at the 1918 election.

After leaving politics, he was clerk of works in the department of the Architect-in-Chief.

He died at his home in Croydon in July 1948, aged 85. He had celebrated his diamond wedding anniversary that January.
