= Thompson Green =

Australian politician

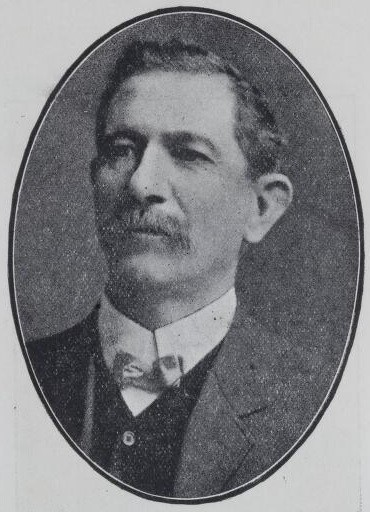

Thompson Green (26 January 1861 – 1 July 1945) was an Australian politician who represented the South Australian House of Assembly multi-member seats of Port Adelaide from 1910 to 1915 and West Torrens from 1915 to 1918. He was a member of the United Labor Party until 1917, when he left to join the National Party in the 1917 Labor split.

Green was born in Glasgow. He went to work at the age of ten, and apprenticed as a boilermaker. He migrated to Sydney in 1886, and subsequently spent time in Melbourne and in Tasmania. Green was involved in the 1890 Australian maritime dispute, after which a number of employers refused to employ him due to his prominent role. He left Melbourne for Adelaide in 1891 and faced continuing problems with being barred from employment due to his union activities, but was hired as a boilermaker at Islington Railway Workshops from 1895 until his election to parliament in 1910. He was heavily involved in union activities, serving as secretary of the state Boilermakers' Society for twenty years, president of the Trades and Labour Council, the inaugural president of the Federated Boilermakers' Society of Australia, and president of the Federated Amalgamated Railway and Tramway Association. He was also president of the Eight Hours Committee, the Adelaide Trades Hall management committee and the Iron Trades Council. In local politics, Green was elected mayor of the Corporate Town of Thebarton.

He was elected to the House of Assembly at the 1910 election for the seat of Port Adelaide, and switched to the new seat of West Torrens following an electoral redistribution in 1915. Green left the Labor Party for the new National Party in the 1917 Labor split over conscription. The Thebarton branch of the Labor Party had already declined to re-endorse him for Thebarton mayor in October 1916 as a result of his support for conscription. Green was defeated by a Labor candidate when he ran for re-election at the 1918 state election.

Following his parliamentary defeat, Green was appointed Inspector of Bridges by the Butler government.

Green died at the home of his daughter at Erindale in 1945 at the age of 84.
