= Edward Alfred Anstey =

Australian politician

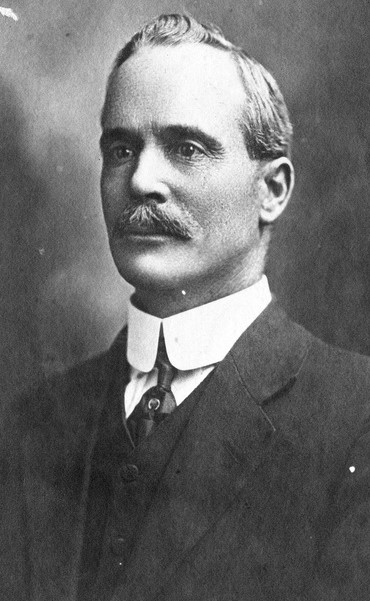

Edward Alfred Anstey (6 July 1858 – 2 July 1952) was an Australian politician who represented the South Australian House of Assembly multi-member seats of Adelaide from 1908 to 1915 and North Adelaide from 1915 to 1921. He represented the United Labor Party until 1917, when he joined the National Party.

Anstey was born at Port Elliot, where he was educated at the local public school. He was a carpenter by trade, apprenticing locally before moving to Adelaide at the age of 24. He went into business as a builder and contractor, and later went into partnership with M. H. Gerard as Anstey & Gerard. He was a councillor of both the Kensington & Norwood and Burnside councils. He was also president of the South Australian Government General Workers Association.

Anstey was elected to the House of Assembly for the Labor Party at a 1908 by-election, following the resignation of Ernest Roberts. He became Government Whip in the Vaughan government following the Labor victory at the 1915 election, but was expelled from the Labor Party alongside Vaughan in the 1917 Labor split over conscription, joining the new National Party.

The National Party became the junior coalition partner under the new conservative Liberal Union government of Archibald Peake, and in April 1918 Anstey was promoted to the ministry to replace colleague Reginald Blundell, becoming Commissioner of Crown Lands and Immigration, Minister of Agriculture and Minister of Repatriation. He lost the agriculture ministry in December, but remained in his other portfolios until April 1920. He was defeated at the 1921 election.

Anstey later served as secretary of the Minda Home for ten years from 1925. He died at Geelong in 1952.
