= Crawford Vaughan =

Australian politician

The Honourable Crawford Vaughan
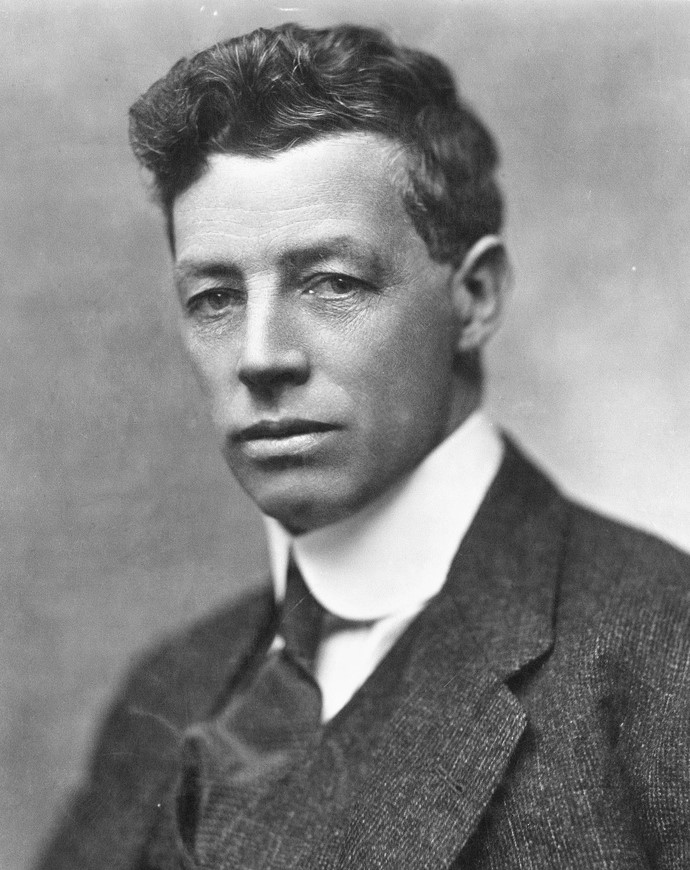
- Vaughan in 1910

27th Premier of South Australia
- In office 3 April 1915 – 14 July 1917
- Monarch: George V
- Governor: Sir Henry Galway
- Preceded by: Archibald Peake
- Succeeded by: Archibald Peake

Leader of the Opposition in South Australia
- In office 14 July 1917 – 1917
- Preceded by: Archibald Peake
- Succeeded by: Andrew Kirkpatrick
- In office 26 July 1913 – 3 April 1915
- Preceded by: John Verran
- Succeeded by: Archibald Peake

Leader of the United Labor Party
- In office 26 July 1913 – 12 February 1917
- Preceded by: John Verran
- Succeeded by: Andrew Kirkpatrick

Personal details
- Born: 14 July 1874 Adelaide, South Australia, Australia
- Died: 15 December 1947 (aged 73) Sydney, New South Wales, Australia
- Party: United Labor Party (1905–17); National Labor (1917–18); Independent (1918)

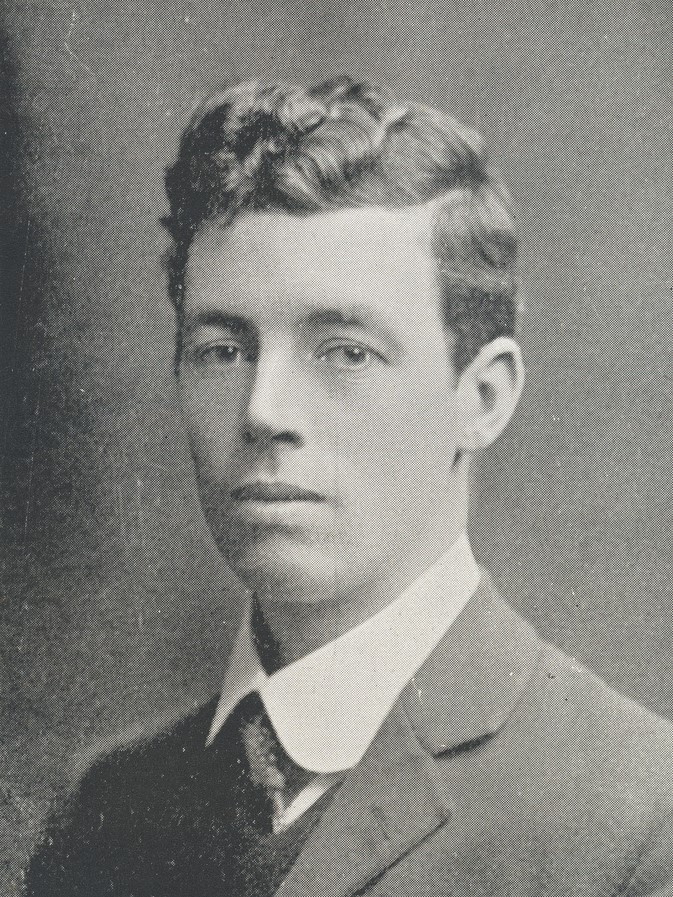

Crawford Vaughan (14 July 1874 – 15 December 1947) was an Australian politician, and the Premier of South Australia from 1915 to 1917. He was a member of the South Australian House of Assembly from 1905 to 1918, representing Torrens (1905–1915) and Sturt (1915–1918). Elected for the United Labor Party, he served as Treasurer in the Verran government, succeeded Verran as Labor leader in 1913, and was elected Premier after the Labor victory at the 1915 state election.

Vaughan's career was curtailed by the 1916–17 Labor split over conscription in World War I, as Vaughan and other supporters of conscription were expelled from the Labor Party in early 1917. Vaughan continued in office until July heading a minority government of the splinter National Party; however, his government was then ousted by the conservative Liberal Union opposition of Archibald Peake. The National Party went into coalition, serving under Peake as junior instead of senior partner, but Vaughan did not take a ministerial portfolio, spent most of his remaining term overseas, and was defeated at the 1918 election after launching a last-minute campaign as an independent candidate.

== Early life ==
Vaughan was born in Adelaide, the son of government photolithographer Alfred Vaughan. He was educated at the Norwood and Marryatville public schools and then Prince Alfred College. After leaving school, he worked for Elder, Smith & Co. Ltd for four years.

== Politics ==
Vaughan was elected to the House of Assembly at the 1905 state election, winning a seat for the United Labor Party in the five-member Torrens at the age of 30. He had previously made two unsuccessful attempts for office: as a Free Trade Party candidate for the Australian House of Representatives at the 1901 federal election, and as an independent candidate for the Australian Senate at the 1903 federal election. He became party whip in 1909, and was promoted to Cabinet as Treasurer when John Verran led Labor to victory at the 1910 election. He was elected leader of the Labor Party when Verran resigned in 1913 following the Labor defeat 1912 election.

Vaughan and Labor defeated the Liberal Union government led by Archibald Peake at the 1915 election, with 26 of 46 seats in the House of Assembly. At the time, he was the youngest Premier in Australia at the age of 40. His brother, John Vaughan, became his Attorney-General. His government improved the education system by restructuring the department's senior bureaucracy, by extending the years of compulsory school attendance and by providing better facilities for the intellectually and physically disabled. The government legislated to allow women to serve in the police force and as justices of the peace, while it also improved workers' access to the arbitration system and diminished the court's punitive powers against trade unions. A wheat pool was created, as were land and housing schemes for war veterans. However, the government also passed a law designed to close Lutheran primary schools.

Vaughan resigned from the Labor Party in 1917 in support of Billy Hughes' proposal for conscription, and was a founding member of the National Labor Party in 1917. Andrew Kirkpatrick replaced Vaughan as leader of the official Labor Party. Vaughan remained as premier atop a minority government until 1917, when his government was defeated in parliament over the conscription issue, with Peake becoming Premier for a third time.

Vaughan spent the last months of his term on a speaking tour of the United States, at the invitation of President Woodrow Wilson. He made a last-minute decision to recontest his seat the 1918 election as an independent, while still overseas – despite having formally been leader of the National Party until that point. However, he was unsuccessful in holding his seat, and retired from South Australian politics.

== Outside politics ==
Crawford had a literary bent: he was a freelance journalist and for a time editor of Quiz before taking up politics, and in later life had two books published: Golden Wattle Time published in Sydney 1942 by Frank Johnson and The Last of Captain Bligh published in London 1950 by Staples Press. He was also the author of radio scripts.

He moved to Sydney after leaving parliament, where he developed a number of business interests. In retirement, he devoted much of his time to his literary interests. He died at his home in Sydney in 1947, and was awarded a state funeral by the government of South Australia.

== Family ==
In 1906 he married Evelyn Goode, sister of parliamentary colleague Clarence Goode. After her death in 1927 he remarried in 1934 to Millicent Preston-Stanley, the first woman to be elected to the Parliament of New South Wales.

== Notes ==
Political offices
Preceded by John Verran	Leader of the Opposition of South Australia; 1913–1915	Succeeded by Archibald Peake
Preceded by Archibald Peake	Premier of South Australia; 1915–1917	Succeeded by Archibald Peake
Preceded by Archibald Peake	Leader of the Opposition of South Australia; 1917	Succeeded by Andrew Kirkpatrick
South Australian House of Assembly
Preceded by John Darling Jr.	Member for Torrens; 1905–1915; Served alongside: George Dankel, Herbert Hudd, Thomas Smeaton, Thomas Ryan, Herbert Parsons, Frederick Coneybeer	District abolished
New district	Member for Sturt; 1915–1918; Served alongside: Thomas Smeaton, Thomas Ryan	Succeeded by Arthur Blackburn
Party political offices
Preceded by John Verran	Leader of the United Labor Party; 1913–1917	Succeeded by Andrew Kirkpatrick
Preceded by New party	Leader of the National Party; 1917–1918	Succeeded by Reginald Blundell
