= John Frederick Herbert =

Australian politician (1868–1943)

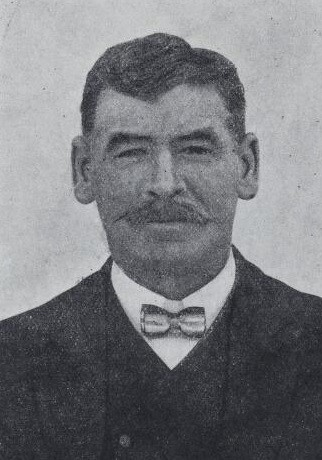

John Frederick Herbert (16 September 1868 – 26 June 1943) was an Australian politician who represented the South Australian House of Assembly multi-member seat of Wallaroo from 1912 to 1918. He represented the United Labor Party until he joined the National Party in the 1917 Labor split.

Herbert was born at Wallaroo, and was a carpenter by trade. He moved to Broken Hill at a young age, where he was involved in the 1892 Broken Hill miners' strike. He returned to Wallaroo over a decade later, where he was a Corporate Town of Wallaroo councillor for eight years, including as mayor in 1912 and 1913, and later town clerk for sixteen years, resigning the latter role in 1936 due to ill health. He was an active sportsman, variously successful at football, cricket swimming and rowing. He was a member of the Independent Order of Oddfellows Manchester Unity for over sixty years, and was secretary of the Wallaroo lodge for many years.

Herbert was elected to the House of Assembly for the United Labor Party at the 1912 state election. He was re-elected unopposed in 1915. He left the Labor Party for the new National Party in the 1917 Labor split over conscription. He was overwhelmingly defeated by a Labor candidate when he ran for re-election at the 1918 election, polling less than half the Labor vote even at Wallaroo township.
