= Reginald Blundell =

Australian politician (1871–1945)

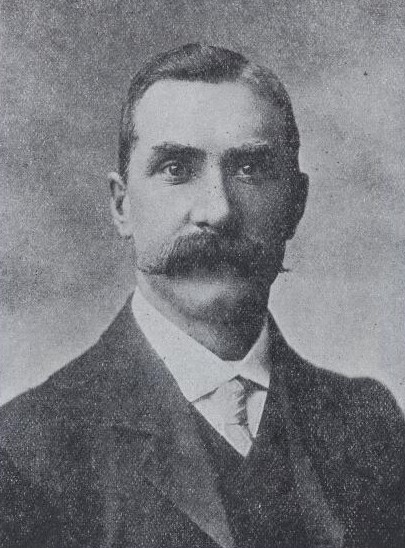

Member of the Australian Parliament for Adelaide
- In office 13 December 1919 – 16 December 1922
- Preceded by: George Edwin Yates
- Succeeded by: George Edwin Yates

Member of the South Australian House of Assembly
- In office 26 January 1907 – 5 April 1918

Personal details
- Born: 4 February 1871 Norwood, South Australia
- Died: 9 August 1945 (aged 74) Glenelg, South Australia
- Party: Labor (1907–17); National Labor (1917–18); Nationalist (1919–22)
- Spouse: Alice Clara Gates
- Occupation: Unionist

Reginald Pole Blundell (4 February 1871 – 9 August 1945) was a member of the South Australian House of Assembly from 1907 to 1918 and the Australian House of Representatives from 1919 to 1922.

Blundell was born in the Adelaide suburb of Norwood and educated at Norwood Public School. He married Alice Clara Gates in 1894. He joined the Tobacco Twisters' Union and was its secretary for eight years. He became secretary of the United Trades and Labour Council of South Australia and was its president in 1905.

He was a Senate candidate in the 1906 federal election in South Australia, finishing a close 5th, missing out by less than 200 votes. Blundell successfully challenged the election, with the High Court in June 1907 declaring that the election of the third choice Senator Joseph Vardon was void.

Blundell did not personally benefit from that success as he had subsequently been successful at a by-election in January 1907 to the House of Assembly as one of four members for the seat of Adelaide, representing the United Labor Party. At the 1915 election in Crawford Vaughan's Labor government he became minister of industry, mines and marine.

In 1917, he left the Labor Party in the 1917 Labor split over conscription and joined the National Party. He was minister for repatriation, agriculture and industry in Archibald Peake's government until his defeat at the 1918 election. At the 1919 federal election, he was elected as a Nationalist to the federal seat of Adelaide, but was defeated at the 1922 election.

Blundell returned to work for W.D. & H.O. Wills as a commercial traveller. He died of pernicious anaemia in the Adelaide suburb of Glenelg survived by his wife, three daughters and three sons.

== Notes ==
Parliament of Australia
Preceded by George Edwin Yates	Member for Adelaide; 1919–1922	Succeeded by George Edwin Yates
