= Angas Parsons =

Australian politician and judge

The Honourable Sir Angas Parsons KBE KC
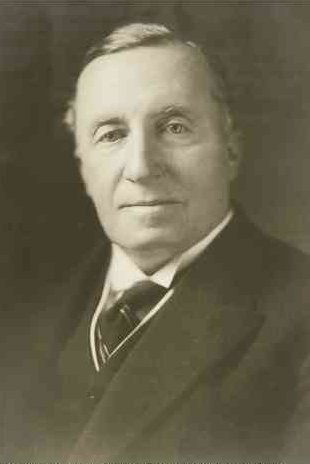
- Sir H. Angas Parsons, 1920

9th Vice-Chancellor of the University of Adelaide
- In office 1942–1945 (term nominally expired 1944)
- Chancellor: Sir William Mitchell
- Preceded by: Edward Henry Rennie (acting); Sir Robert William Chapman (acting); Sir William Mitchell
- Succeeded by: John McKellar Stewart

Member of the South Australian Parliament for Murray
- In office 1918–1921

Member of the South Australian Parliament for Torrens
- In office 1912–1915
- Succeeded by: Electorate abolished

Personal details
- Born: Herbert Angas Parsons; 23 May 1872 North Adelaide
- Died: 2 November 1945 (aged 73)
- Resting place: North Road Cemetery
- Party: Liberal Union
- Spouse: Mary Elsie Bonython
- Parents: John Langdon Parsons (father); Rose Parsons (mother)
- Education: University of Adelaide
- Awards: Kt 1936; KBE in 1945

Sir Herbert Angas Parsons, KBE, KC (23 May 1872 – 2 November 1945), generally known as Sir Angas Parsons, was a Cornish Australian lawyer, politician and judge.

== Early life and education ==
Parsons was born in North Adelaide on 23 May 1872, the only son of Cornish born minister and politician John Langdon Parsons (1837–1903) and his first wife Rose.

He was educated at Prince Alfred College and Roseworthy Agricultural College before spending three years following "pastoral and financial pursuits". He then studied law at the University of Adelaide, serving his articles with George Ash and graduating in March 1897, aged 24.

== Career ==
He was admitted to the Bar later in 1897. He joined with Patrick McMahon Glynn, KC. in partnership in 1898; they were joined in October 1908 by George McEwin and subsequently by (later Sir) Mellis Napier.

In 1912 he stood for parliament and was elected member of the South Australian House of Assembly for Torrens (1912–1915), and subsequently member for Murray. It was around June of this year that he became universally referred to as "Angas Parsons". He was briefly Attorney-General of South Australia and minister of education in 1915. Parsons was appointed King's Counsel in 1916, a judge of the Supreme Court in 1921, senior puisne judge in 1927, and acting chief justice in 1935. On occasions, Parsons acted as Lieutenant-Governor of South Australia and, after his father's death, in 1904 he became consul for Japan.

== Service and recognition ==
Like his father-in-law, he became president of the Cornish Association of South Australia. He was also warden of the University of Adelaide's senate, and vice-chancellor from 1942 to 1944.

He was knighted in 1936, and appointed Knight Commander of the Order of the British Empire (KBE) in 1945. He retired in 1945 and, having "spent many hours at the Adelaide Club, preferring its convivial atmosphere to his wife's Methodism".

== Personal life ==
On 18 April 1900, Parsons married Mary Elsie Bonython, eldest surviving child of Sir John Langdon Bonython and his wife Mary Louisa Fredericka née Balthasar. They had two sons, who were given the double-barrelled surname of "Angas-Parsons" to preserve their father's matrilineal name.

Mary Elsie Parsons served with distinction as Mayoress at official functions for her widowed brother Sir John Lavington Bonython in 1911 and 1912.

Parsons died of cirrhosis on 2 November 1945. He was buried with his parents in North Road Cemetery.

== Gallery ==
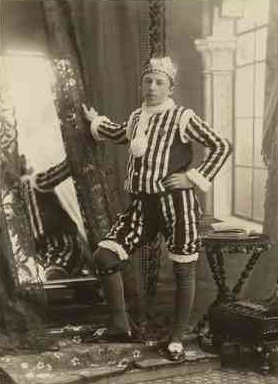
Parsons dressed as the King of Spades for the Adelaide Mayoral Children's Fancy Dress Ball, 1887

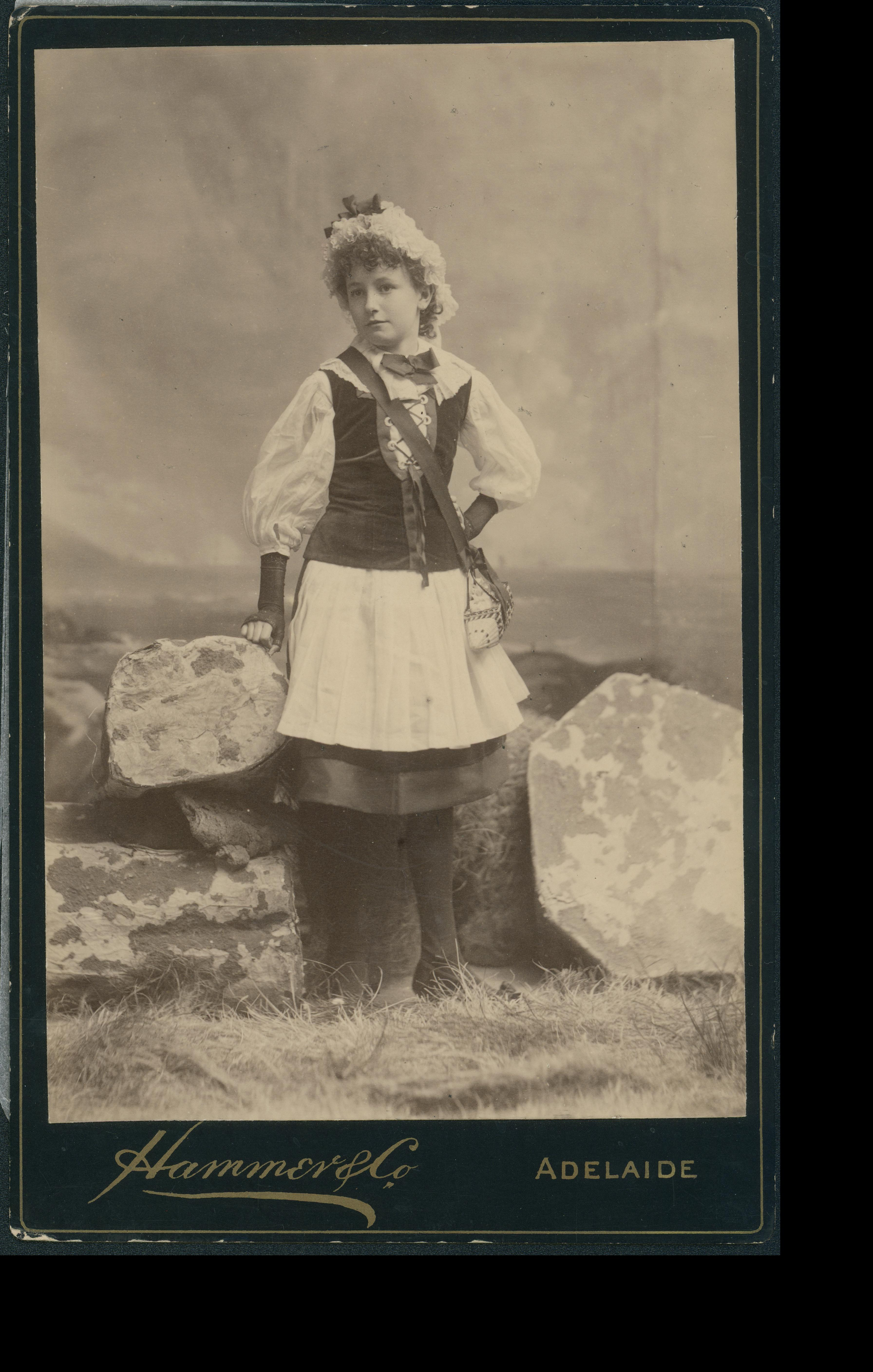
Elsie dressed as a Norwegian fishgirl, 1887

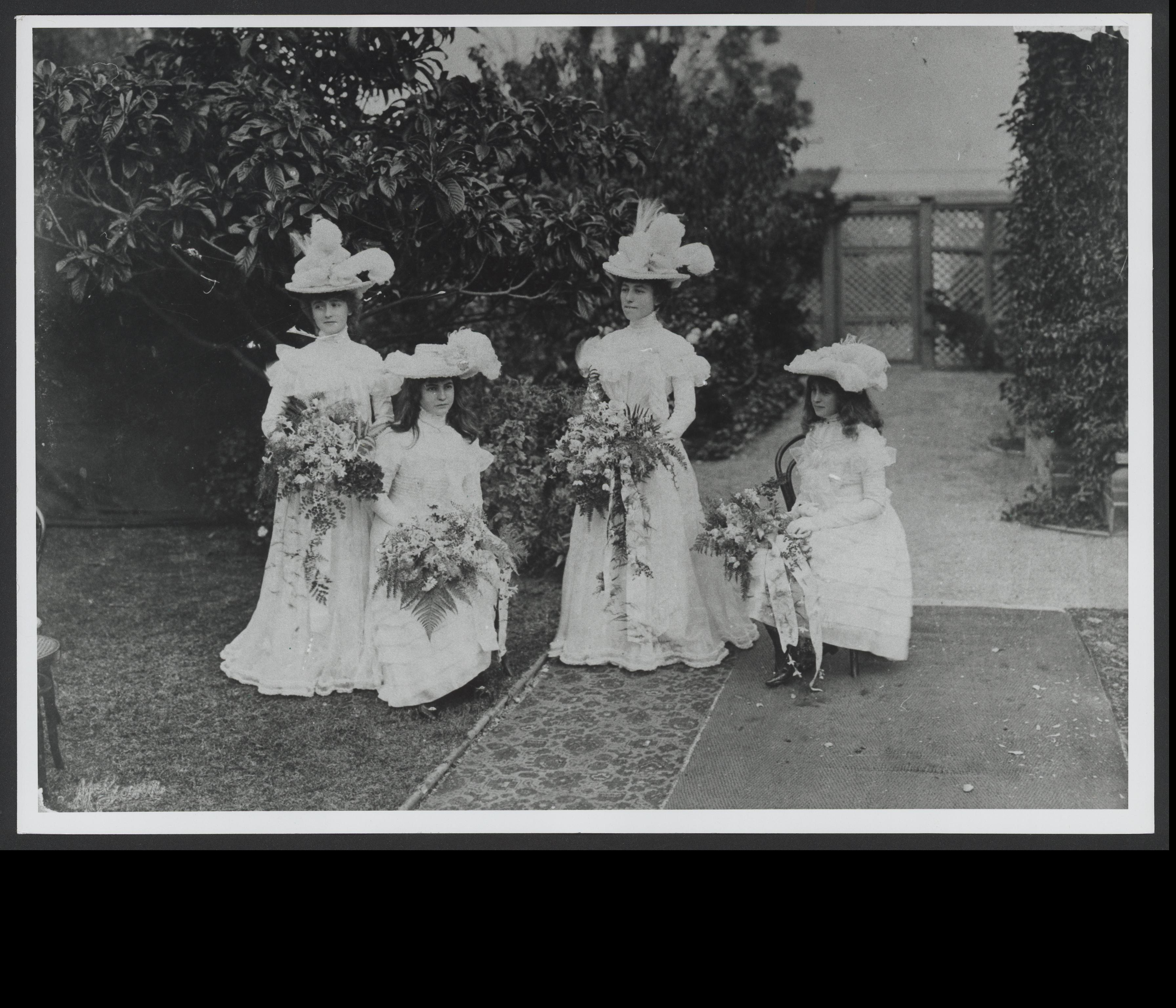
Elsie's bridesmaids - 18 April 1900; left to right: Elsie Parsons (half sister of bridegroom); Ada & Edith Bonython (sisters of the bride); Winifred Bonython (cousin of the bride)

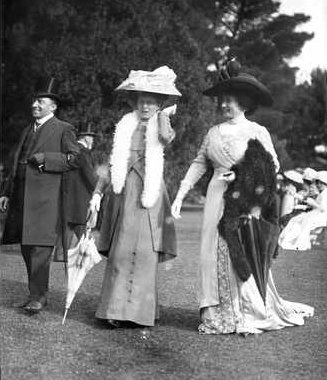
Herbert, Elsie, & friend, Garden party at Government House, 1912

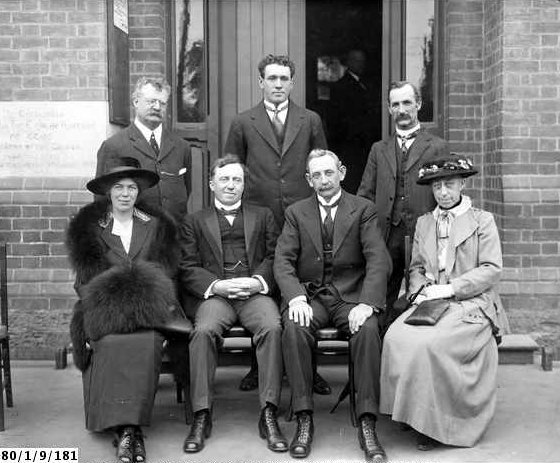
1917 - Members of an Observation School Committee; Angas Parsons sitting front row, second from left.

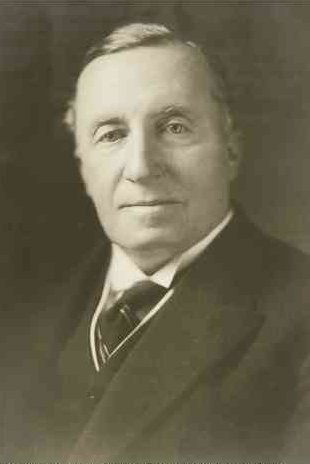
1920

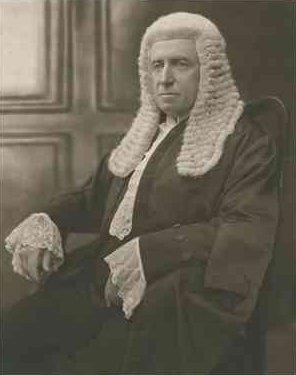
1921

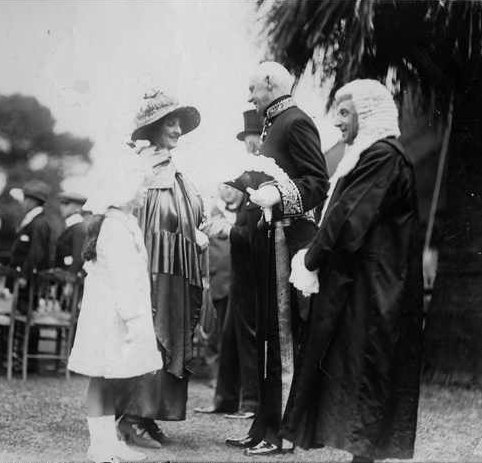
1921 - Lady Weigall, wife of the Governor of South Australia, accompanied by her daughter Priscilla greeting Sir George Murray, Lieutenant Governor and Justice Angas Parsons at a garden party held in the grounds of Government House, Adelaide.

Political offices
Preceded by Hermann Homburg	Attorney-General of South Australia; 1915	Succeeded by John Vaughan
Parliament of South Australia
Preceded by George Dankel; Thomas Ryan	Member for Torrens; 1912–1915	Succeeded by Electorate abolished
Preceded by George Dunn; Maurice William Parish	Member for Murray; 1918–1921	Succeeded by John Francis Godfree; John Beavis Randell
