= Electoral district of North Adelaide =

Former South Australian state electoral district

North Adelaide South Australia—House of Assembly
- State: South Australia
- Dates current: 1875–1902, 1915–1938
- Namesake: North Adelaide, South Australia
- Demographic: Metropolitan
- Coordinates: 34°54′S 138°36′E

North Adelaide was an electoral district of the House of Assembly in the Australian state of South Australia from 1875 to 1902 and again from 1915 to 1938.

North Adelaide was also the name of an electoral district of the unicameral South Australian Legislative Council from 1851 until its abolition in 1857, John Bentham Neales being the elected member.

The North Adelaide area is currently fairly safe to safe Liberal and is represented in the seat of Adelaide.

== Members ==
Single-member (1875–1884)
Member	Party	Term
Arthur Blyth		1875–1877
Neville Blyth		1877–1878
Caleb Peacock		1878–1881
J. L. Parsons		1881–1884

Two members (1884–1902)
Member	Party	Term	Member	Party	Term
E. C. Stirling		1884–1887	G. C. Hawker		1884–1895
Lewis Cohen		1887–1893	G. C. Hawker		1884–1895
Richard Wood	Labor	1893–1897	G. C. Hawker		1884–1895
Richard Wood	Labor	1893–1897	Paddy Glynn	Defence League	1895–1896
Richard Wood	Labor	1893–1897	Arthur Harrold	Defence League	1896–1897
Richard Wood		1897–1902	Paddy Glynn		1897–1901
Richard Wood		1897–1902	H. R. Dixson		1901–1902

Two members (1915–1938)
Member	Party	Term	Member	Party	Term
E. A. Anstey	Labor	1915–1917	W. D. Ponder	Labor	1915–1917
E. A. Anstey	National	1917–1921	W. D. Ponder	National	1917–1921
Frederick Birrell	Labor	1921–1931	Stanley Whitford	Labor	1921–1927
Frederick Birrell	Labor	1921–1931	Shirley Jeffries	Liberal Federation	1927–1930
Frederick Birrell	Labor	1921–1931	Walter Warne	Labor	1930–1933
Frederick Birrell	Parliamentary Labor	1931–1933	Walter Warne	Labor	1930–1933
Victor Newland	Liberal and Country	1933–1938	Shirley Jeffries	Liberal and Country	1933–1938
