= William Miller (South Australian politician) =

Australian politician

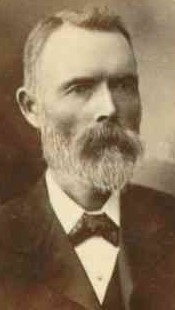

William Miller (1850 – 20 June 1922) was an Australian politician who represented the South Australian House of Assembly multi-member seat of Burra Burra from 1902 to 1918. He represented the Farmers and Producers Political Union (1905–1910), the Liberal Union (1910–1918) and the Farmers and Settlers Association (1918).

Miller was born at Stronsay in the Orkney Islands, and with his parents Peter (died 1906) and Janet Miller (died 1908) arrived in South Australia on the ship Amazon in February 1852. He was raised at Mount Crawford until 1857, at the Hundred of South Rhine until 1860, and thereafter near Springton, following his father's work as a farm overseer and manager and later farmer in his own right. Miller settled in the Hundred of Belalie when it was first opened up for settlement, farming wheat, and a year later moved to Golden Gully (in modern-day Minvalara), near Peterborough. Miller would continue to farm until selling his property in 1909. He was chairman of the District Council of Yongala from 1895 to 1908, and was chairman of the South Australian Farmers Co-operative Union from 1912 until his death.

He was elected to the House of Assembly for Burra Burra at the 1902 election. He joined the Farmers and Producers Political Union when it was founded in 1905, which subsequently merged with other parties to form the Liberal Union in 1910. He resigned from the Liberal Union in early 1918, alongside two colleagues, and joined the new Farmers and Settlers Association; however, he was defeated as an FSA candidate at the 1918 election.
