= William David Ponder =

Australian politician

William David Ponder (18 March 1855 – 21 May 1933) was an Australian politician who represented the South Australian House of Assembly multi-member seats of Adelaide from 1905 to 1915 and North Adelaide from 1915 to 1921. He represented the United Labor Party until the 1917 Labor split, when he joined the National Party.

Ponder was born in London, but his family moved to Adelaide in the same year he was born; his sister was prominent journalist and author Winifred Ponder. His family initially lived in Adelaide and Gawler, but moved to Kapunda in 1860, where he was educated and undertook a printing apprenticeship for the Kapunda Herald. He worked as a compositor for the Government Printing Office and the South Australian Register. He subsequently moved to The Advertiser, where he worked as city collector and wrote a regular cricket column. He was subsequently appointed by Sir Langdon Bonython as a sub-editor for The Express and Telegraph. Later, he was an advertising agent from 1897 to 1918, a director of the Co-Operative Building Society for thirty years, and governor of the Adelaide Botanic Gardens. He was also a significant Freemason, occupying a number of positions in that movement. He was an active member of the South Australian Literary Societies' Union; his claim to have first mooted that body's Union Parliament, was refuted by George Hussey.

Ponder was first elected to office in 1898 with his election as a City of Adelaide councillor for Young Ward, having been defeated in an attempt for that seat the previous year and in a bid for the Legislative Council in 1901. He was a councillor for six years, but ran for alderman and lost in 1904. Ponder was elected to the House of Assembly as a Labor member at the 1905 state election, and in 1915 was reported to have only ever missed one sitting. He was a state MP for sixteen years, being re-elected numerous times. He was expelled from the Labor Party in the 1917 Labor split over his support for conscription, joined the splinter National Party, and was re-elected in 1918 under that banner. However, following the collapse of the National Party's coalition with the conservative Liberal Union, he was defeated in 1921 for the short-lived Progressive Country Party alliance.

He died at "Wilcot", his home in Gilberton, in 1933. He had been in good health until a short time before his death, but suffered two heart attacks in short succession. He was buried at West Terrace Cemetery.
