= 1915 South Australian state election =

- 27 March 1915

All 46 seats in the South Australian House of Assembly 24 seats were needed for a majority
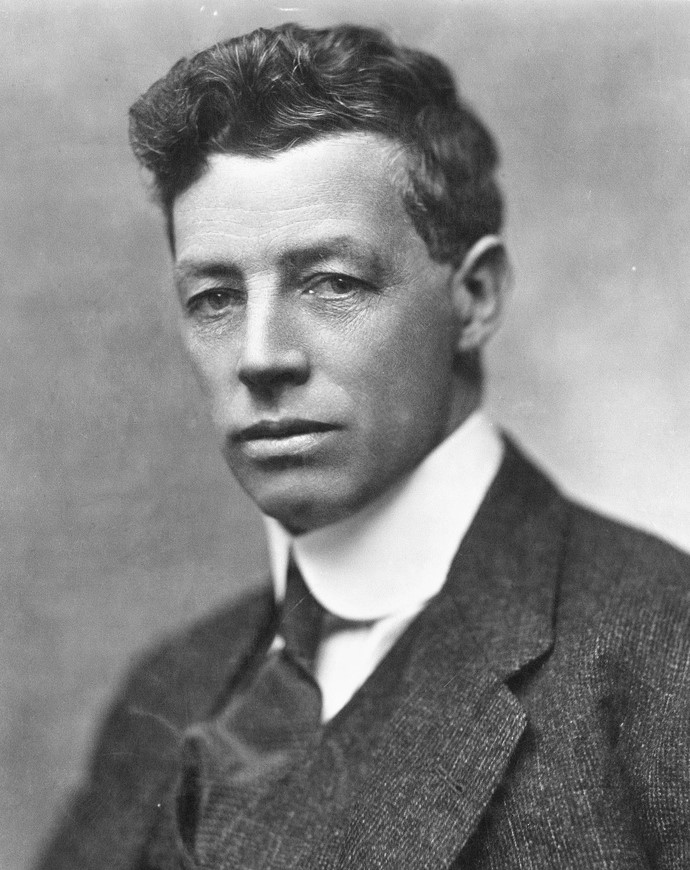

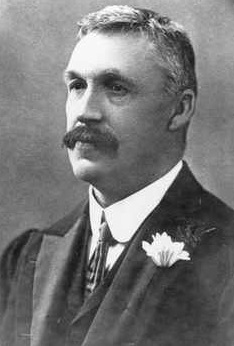
	First party	Second party
Leader	Crawford Vaughan	Archibald Peake
Party	Labor	Liberal Union
Leader since	1913	5 June 1909
Leader's seat	Sturt	Alexandra
Last election	16 seats	24 seats
Seats won	26 seats	20 seats
Seat change	▲10	▼4
Percentage	45.90%	51.58%
Swing	▼0.88	▲0.17
Premier before election
Archibald Peake
Liberal Union
Elected Premier
Crawford Vaughan
Labor

State elections were held in South Australia on 27 March 1915. All 46 seats in the South Australian House of Assembly were up for election. The incumbent Liberal Union government led by Premier of South Australia Archibald Peake was defeated by the opposition United Labor Party led by Leader of the Opposition Crawford Vaughan. Each district elected multiple members, with voters casting multiple votes.

A redistribution in 1913 was forced by the enlargement of the House of Assembly to 46 members. The state was divided into 19 electoral districts: eight 3-member, eleven 2-member. The redistribution's intention failed as it was meant to assist the Liberal Union.

The United Labor Party became the South Australian branch of the Australian Labor Party (ALP) on 14 September 1917.

The National Labor Party, a splinter group of the ALP, formed in 1917 state and federally over the issue of conscription. The ALP had elected 26 of 46 Assembly members at the 1915 election, all but seven ALP MPs defected to National Labor. The ALP had 7 of 20 Council members, four defected. Seven MPs of the renamed National Party were re-elected at the 1918 election.

== Results ==
Arrangement of the House of Assembly after the 1915 state election.

South Australian state election, 27 March 1915 House of Assembly << 1912–1918 >>
Enrolled voters	181,516				
Votes cast	136,055		Turnout	74.95%	+ 3.09%
Informal votes	1,441		Informal	1.06%	– 0.29%
Summary of votes by party
Party	Primary votes	%	Swing	Seats	Change
Liberal Union	171,993	51.58%	+ 0.17%	20	– 4
Labor	153,034	45.90%	– 0.88%	26	+ 10
Independent	8,405	2.52%	+ 0.71%	0	± 0
Total	333,432			46	

== See also ==
- Results of the 1915 South Australian state election (House of Assembly)
- Members of the South Australian House of Assembly, 1915-1918
- Members of the South Australian Legislative Council, 1915-1918
