= National Party (South Australia) =

Political party in South Australia

National Party (SA)
- Founded: 1917
- Dissolved: 1923
- Preceded by: Australian Labor Party (SA)
- Merged into: Liberal Federation

The National Party was a political party active in South Australia from 1917 to 1923. As with the federal National Labor Party, it was created in the wake of the Australian Labor Party split over conscription, resulting in the February 1917 expulsion from the South Australian Labor Party of the Premier, Crawford Vaughan, and his supporters. It was initially known as the National Labor Party like its federal counterpart, but was renamed at a conference in June 1917. The party initially continued in government under Vaughan, but was subsequently defeated in parliament in July 1917, and thereafter served as the junior partner in a coalition with the Liberal Union under Archibald Peake.

After the 1915 election, the ALP had 26 of 46 House of Assembly members, of whom all but seven defected to National Labor. In the Legislative Council, the ALP had 7 of 20 members, of whom four defected. Seven National Labor MPs were re-elected at the 1918 election. Following that election, William Harvey was left as the only National Labor MLC. Peter Reidy was left as the only National Labor MP following the 1921 election.

The party discussed a merger with the Liberal Union in late 1917, but negotiations broke down. The main sticking point was the National Party's support for the right of both husband and wife to vote in households which met the property qualification to elect the Legislative Council - the so-called "dual vote". Nonetheless, the two parties contested the 1918 state election in coalition after a protracted period of negotiations.

Following conflict with their senior coalition partner, the National Party ministers were forced to resign from the Cabinet in late 1920, and the party contested the 1921 election, in conjunction with several former Liberals, as the Progressive Country Party. In the absence of any general agreement for the Liberal Union to not contest National Party/Progressive Country seats, the National Party were soundly defeated by their former coalition partner. Five incumbent MPs contested the election under the Progressive Country Party banner: Peter Reidy (Victoria), Edward Alfred Anstey and William David Ponder (North Adelaide), Frederick Coneybeer (East Torrens) and Thomas Hyland Smeaton (Sturt). Former MP John Vaughan also contested Sturt. Of those five, only Reidy survived, having personally arranged with the Liberal Union to be unopposed. William Humphrey Harvey, who had not been up for re-election, remained as the sole survivor of the party in the Legislative Council, but he subsequently joined the Liberal Union in July 1921. The party was again being referred to as the National Party when it merged with the Liberal Union to create the Liberal Federation in October 1923.

== See also ==
- Australian Labor Party (South Australian Branch)
- Members of the South Australian House of Assembly, 1915–1918
- Members of the South Australian House of Assembly, 1918–1921
- Members of the South Australian Legislative Council, 1915–1918
- Members of the South Australian Legislative Council, 1918–1921
