= Liberal Union (South Australia) =

- Founded: 1910
- Dissolved: October 16, 1923
- Preceded by: Liberal and Democratic Union, Australasian National League, Farmers and Producers Political Union
- Succeeded by: Liberal Federation

The Liberal Union was a political party in South Australia resulting from a merger between the Liberal and Democratic Union (LDU) and the two independent conservative parties, the Australasian National League (ANL, formerly National Defence League (NDL)) and the Farmers and Producers Political Union (FPPU) as a response to Labor successes culminating in South Australia's first majority government at the 1910 election.

The Liberal Union was created in 1910 after the LDU, the ANL and the FPPU endorsed a shared "Liberal" slate of candidates at that year's election. The parties readily approved the merger, however, the LDU which salvaged the fewest of their principles from the merger were more hesitant. LDU leader Archibald Peake persuaded a party conference that 'the day of the middle party is passed', and approved the merger by just one vote.

The Liberal Union was affiliated to the federal Nationalist Party. Unusually, the Nationalist Party in South Australia was composed of members of two separate parties, the Liberal Union and the National Party, which caused significant tensions when the two parties had a bitter falling out and ran competing slates of candidates at the 1922 federal election.

The Liberal Union amalgamated with the National Party to form the Liberal Federation in October 1923.

== Parliamentary leaders ==
- Archibald Peake (1910–1920)
- Henry Barwell (1920–1923)

== See also ==
- Members of the South Australian House of Assembly, 1910–1912
- Members of the South Australian House of Assembly, 1912–1915
- Members of the South Australian House of Assembly, 1915–1918
- Members of the South Australian House of Assembly, 1918–1921
- Members of the South Australian House of Assembly, 1921–1924
- Members of the South Australian Legislative Council, 1910–1912
- Members of the South Australian Legislative Council, 1912–1915
- Members of the South Australian Legislative Council, 1915–1918
- Members of the South Australian Legislative Council, 1918–1921
- Members of the South Australian Legislative Council, 1921–1924
