= Results of the 1921 South Australian state election (House of Assembly) =

South Australian state election, 9 April 1921 House of Assembly << 1918–1924 >>
Enrolled voters	289,843				
Votes cast	161,165		Turnout	62.71%	-1.06%
Informal votes	1,774		Informal	N/A	
Summary of votes by party
Party	Primary votes	%	Swing	Seats	Change
Labor	179,308	44.62%	-0.07%	16	1
Liberal Union	140,229	34.90%	+6.96%	25	+ 3
Progressive Country	51,603	12.84%	-5.82%	1	5
Farmers and Settlers	16,417	4.09%	-0.18%	4	+ 3
Independent	14,288	3.56%	-0.28%	0	± 0
Total	401,845			46	

This is a list of House of Assembly results for the 1921 South Australian state election. Each district elected multiple members.

Every voter would receive a ballot paper where they would cast 2 or 3 votes for different candidates. In electorates that were not unopposed, the 2 or 3 candidates with the most votes would be elected.

== Results by electoral district ==
=== Adelaide ===
1921 South Australian state election: Adelaide
Party	Candidate	Votes	%	±%
Labor	John Gunn (elected)	7,150	31.1	+6.4
Labor	Bill Denny (elected)	7,021	30.5	−0.3
Labor	Bert Edwards (elected)	6,503	28.2	+3.6
Progressive Country	James Mitchell	2,352	10.2	+10.2
Total formal votes		23,026; 8,838 ballots	98.1	−0.7
Informal votes		171	1.9	+0.7
Turnout		9,009	51.3	+15.2
Party total votes
Labor		20,674	89.8	+10.3
Progressive Country		2,352	10.2	–8.3

=== Albert ===
1921 South Australian state election: Albert
Party	Candidate	Votes	%	±%
Farmers and Settlers	Malcolm McIntosh (elected)	2,111	18.7	+18.7
Farmers and Settlers	Frederick McMillan (elected)	2,105	18.6	+18.6
Liberal Union	Richard O'Connor	2,103	18.6	−0.6
Liberal Union	William Angus	1,995	17.6	+0.2
Labor	Joshua Pedlar	1,514	13.4	+13.4
Labor	Thomas Knuckey	1,479	13.1	+13.1
Total formal votes		11,307; 5,696 ballots	98.1	+0.1
Informal votes		109	1.9	−0.1
Turnout		5,805	56.3	+2.3
Party total votes
Farmers and Settlers		4,216	37.3	+3.2
Liberal Union		4,098	36.2	−0.4
Labor		2,993	26.5	−2.7

=== Alexandra ===
1921 South Australian state election: Alexandra
Party	Candidate	Votes	%	±%
Liberal Union	George Ritchie (elected)	4,344	27.7	+5.9
Liberal Union	George Laffer (elected)	4,291	27.4	+5.4
Liberal Union	Herbert Hudd (elected)	4,197	26.8	+26.8
Labor	Matthew Hunt	1,657	10.6	−0.6
Progressive Country	Walter Furler	1,192	7.6	+3.8
Total formal votes		15,681; 6,214 ballots	98.8	+0.4
Informal votes		77	1.2	−0.4
Turnout		6,291	51.9	−0.7
Party total votes
Liberal Union		12,832	81.8	+17.9
Labor		1,657	10.6	−21.7
Progressive Country		1,192	7.6	+7.6

=== Barossa ===
1921 South Australian state election: Barossa
Party	Candidate	Votes	%	±%
Liberal Union	William Hague (elected)	4,766	18.7	+2.4
Liberal Union	Henry Crosby (elected)	4,649	18.3	+2.3
Liberal Union	Richard Butler (elected)	4,264	16.8	+0.9
Labor	George Cooke	3,817	15.0	−0.3
Labor	Leonard Hopkins	3,549	13.9	+13.9
Labor	Edwin Parham	3,317	13.0	+13.0
Progressive Country	Albert Nairne	1,091	4.3	+4.3
Total formal votes		25,453; 8,665 ballots	99.0	+0.4
Informal votes		86	1.0	−0.4
Turnout		8,751	74.4	+10.9
Party total votes
Liberal Union		13,679	53.7	+5.5
Labor		10,683	42.0	−4.6
Progressive Country		1,091	4.3	+4.3

=== Burra Burra ===
1921 South Australian state election: Burra Burra
Party	Candidate	Votes	%	±%
Farmers and Settlers	Thomas Hawke (elected)	4,315	16.6	+16.6
Liberal Union	George Jenkins (elected)	4,214	16.2	+4.2
Liberal Union	Samuel Dickson (elected)	3,986	15.3	+3.5
Labor	Mick O'Halloran	3,864	14.9	+2.8
Labor	Harry Buxton	3,739	14.4	+2.2
Labor	Leonard Wilcott	3,611	13.9	+1.9
Progressive Country	James McDonald	1,480	5.7	+5.7
Independent	Edward Craigie	816	3.1	+3.1
Total formal votes		26,025; 8,939 ballots	98.6	−0.6
Informal votes		123	1.4	+0.6
Turnout		9,062	68.9	+6.8
Party total votes
Labor		11,214	43.1	+6.8
Liberal Union		8,200	31.5	+7.7
Farmers and Settlers		4,315	16.6	−11.5
Progressive Country		1,480	5.7	−6.0
Independent	Edward Craigie	816	3.1	+3.1

=== East Torrens ===
1921 South Australian state election: East Torrens
Party	Candidate	Votes	%	±%
Liberal Union	Walter Hamilton (elected)	7,827	14.1	−2.7
Liberal Union	Joseph Harper (elected)	7,386	13.3	+13.3
Labor	Leslie Hunkin (elected)	7,115	12.8	+12.8
Liberal Union	Albert Sutton	6,988	12.6	+12.6
Labor	Herbert George	6,715	12.1	−1.6
Labor	James Flaherty	6,491	11.7	+11.7
Progressive Country	Frederick Coneybeer	5,548	10.0	−8.7
Progressive Country	Alexander Jolly	3,805	6.9	+6.9
Progressive Country	Thomas Buttery	3,683	6.6	+6.6
Total formal votes		55,558; 18,745 ballots	98.9	+0.4
Informal votes		207	1.1	−0.4
Turnout		18,952	63.2	+16.8
Party total votes
Liberal Union		22,201	40.0	+23.2
Labor		20,321	36.6	−4.7
Progressive Country		13,036	23.5	−11.4

=== Flinders ===
1921 South Australian state election: Flinders
Party	Candidate	Votes	%	±%
Liberal Union	James Moseley (elected)	2,582	26.2	−7.1
Farmers and Settlers	John Chapman (elected)	2,427	24.6	−1.5
Independent	Samuel Lindsay	1,332	13.5	−8.2
Labor	Michael Murphy	1,218	12.4	+12.4
Labor	Thomas Lyons	1,159	11.8	+12.4
Independent	Harr Frick	1,130	11.5	+11.5
Total formal votes		9,848; 4,973 ballots	98.4	+0.1
Informal votes		83	1.6	−0.1
Turnout		5,056	61.4	+10.9
Party total votes
Liberal Union		2,582	26.2	−26.0
Farmers and Settlers		2,427	24.6	−1.5
Labor		2,377	24.1	+24.1
Independent	Samuel Lindsay	1,332	13.5	−8.2
Independent	Harr Frick	1,130	11.5	+11.5

=== Murray ===
1921 South Australian state election: Murray
Party	Candidate	Votes	%	±%
Liberal Union	Harry Young (elected)	4,100	19.1	+0.6
Liberal Union	John Godfree (elected)	3,749	17.5	+17.5
Liberal Union	John Randell (elected)	3,647	17.0	+17.0
Labor	Frank Staniford	2,948	13.8	+0.3
Labor	Sid O'Flaherty	2,881	13.4	−1.5
Labor	Bert Hoare	2,807	13.1	+13.1
Farmers and Settlers	James Daniel	1,295	6.0	+6.0
Total formal votes		21,427; 7,394 ballots	99.2	+0.2
Informal votes		56	0.8	−0.2
Turnout		7,450	61.3	+4.4
Party total votes
Liberal Union		11,496	53.7	+21.3
Labor		8,636	40.3	−1.2
Farmers and Settlers		1,295	6.0	+6.0

=== Newcastle ===
1921 South Australian state election: Newcastle
Party	Candidate	Votes	%	±%
Labor	Thomas Butterfield (elected)	2,396	30.4	−0.5
Labor	William Harvey (elected)	2,241	28.1	+0.3
Liberal Union	Edward Twopeny	1,699	21.5	−0.7
Farmers and Settlers	John Smith	1,554	19.7	+19.7
Total formal votes		7,890; 4,003 ballots	98.9	−0.2
Informal votes		46	1.1	+0.2
Turnout		4,049	59.6	+5.9
Party total votes
Labor		4,637	58.8	−0.2
Liberal Union		1,699	21.5	−19.5
Farmers and Settlers		1,554	19.7	+19.7

=== North Adelaide ===
1921 South Australian state election: North Adelaide
Party	Candidate	Votes	%	±%
Labor	Frederick Birrell (elected)	4,486	23.1	+23.1
Labor	Stanley Whitford (elected)	4,288	22.1	+22.1
Liberal Union	Charles Butler	4,195	21.6	+21.6
Progressive Country	Edward Anstey	3,898	20.1	−10.1
Progressive Country	William Ponder	2,522	13.0	−16.4
Total formal votes		19,389; 10,945 ballots	98.6	+0.1
Informal votes		151	1.4	−0.1
Turnout		11,096	65.4	+18.6
Party total votes
Labor		8,774	45.3	+4.9
Progressive Country		6,420	33.1	−26.5
Liberal Union		4,195	21.6	+21.6

=== Port Adelaide ===
1921 South Australian state election: Port Adelaide
Party	Candidate	Votes	%	±%
Labor	John Price (elected)	9,319	35.5	+2.8
Labor	John Verran (elected)	8,769	33.4	+2.3
Farmers and Settlers	Joseph Lambert	4,281	16.3	+16.3
Liberal Union	Leon Colley	3,860	14.7	+14.7
Total formal votes		26,229; 13,219 ballots	99.1	+2.1
Informal votes		122	0.9	−2.1
Turnout		13,341	61.1	+13.1
Party total votes
Labor		18,088	69.0	+5.2
Farmers and Settlers		4,281	16.3	+16.3
Liberal Union		3,860	14.7	+14.7

=== Port Pirie ===
1921 South Australian state election: Port Pirie
Party	Candidate	Votes	%	±%
Labor	Lionel Hill (elected)	3,190	40.8	+7.8
Labor	John Fitzgerald (elected)	3,074	39.4	+7.0
Independent	William Blight	1,548	19.8	+19.8
Total formal votes		7,812; 4,569 ballots	99.2	0.0
Informal votes		37	0.8	0.0
Turnout		4,606	72.7	+14.2
Party total votes
Labor		6,264	80.2	+14.8
Independent		1,548	19.8	+19.8

=== Stanley ===
1921 South Australian state election: Stanley
Party	Candidate	Votes	%	±%
Liberal Union	Robert Nicholls (elected)	4,050	31.5	−2.9
Liberal Union	Henry Barwell (elected)	3,974	30.9	−2.8
Labor	Even George	1,828	14.2	+14.2
Labor	Albert Smith	1,474	11.5	+11.5
Farmers and Settlers	Henry Sargent	800	6.2	+6.2
Farmers and Settlers	John Aughey	719	5.6	+5.6
Total formal votes		12,845; 6,563 ballots	97.6	−1.3
Informal votes		163	2.4	+1.3
Turnout		6,726	73.0	+10.0
Party total votes
Liberal Union		8,024	62.5	−5.6
Labor		3,302	25.7	+8.2
Farmers and Settlers		1,519	11.8	−2.6

=== Sturt ===
1921 South Australian state election: Sturt
Party	Candidate	Votes	%	±%
Liberal Union	Herbert Richards (elected)	8,803	14.2	+14.2
Liberal Union	George Hussey (elected)	8,396	13.5	+13.5
Liberal Union	Ernest Anthoney (elected)	8,366	13.5	+13.5
Labor	Harry Kneebone	6,849	11.0	+11.0
Labor	Thomas Grealy	6,474	10.4	+10.4
Labor	Tom Howard	6,282	10.1	−1.5
Progressive Country	Thomas Smeaton	4,865	7.8	−10.2
Independent	Verge Blunden	4,672	7.5	+7.5
Progressive Country	John Vaughan	4,494	7.2	+2.0
Progressive Country	Alfred Morris	2,918	4.7	+4.7
Total formal votes		62,119; 21,595 ballots	99.0	+0.4
Informal votes		212	1.0	−0.4
Turnout		21,807	64.2	+20.2
Party total votes
Liberal Union		25,565	41.2	+5.0
Labor		19,605	31.6	−3.8
Progressive Country		12,277	19.8	−3.4
Independent	Verge Blunden	4,672	7.5	+7.5

=== Victoria ===
1921 South Australian state election: Victoria
Party	Candidate	Votes	%	±%
Progressive Country	Peter Reidy (elected)	4,677	27.5	+2.9
Liberal Union	Vernon Petherick (elected)	4,527	26.6	+1.6
Labor	Eric Shepherd	4,078	24.0	+24.0
Labor	Charles McHugh	3,718	21.9	+0.2
Total formal votes		17,000; 8,625 ballots	99.3	+0.9
Informal votes		64	0.7	−0.9
Turnout		8,689	69.8	+5.3
Party total votes
Labor		7,796	45.9	+2.6
Progressive Country		4,677	27.5	+2.9
Liberal Union		4,527	26.6	+1.6

=== Wallaroo ===
1921 South Australian state election: Wallaroo
Party	Candidate	Votes	%	±%
Labor	Robert Richards (elected)	3,465	35.2	+1.9
Labor	John Pedler (elected)	3,359	34.1	+1.2
Independent	John Verran	3,020	30.7	+13.0
Total formal votes		9,844; 6,343 ballots	99.5	+0.2
Informal votes		32	0.5	−0.2
Turnout		6,275	80.1	+4.3
Party total votes
Labor		6,824	69.3	+3.1
Independent	John Verran	3,020	30.7	+30.7

=== West Torrens ===
1921 South Australian state election: West Torrens
Party	Candidate	Votes	%	±%
Labor	Alfred Blackwell (elected)	8,437	30.8	−1.4
Labor	John McInnes (elected)	7,868	28.7	−1.9
Progressive Country	Henry Chesson	5,888	21.5	+2.9
Liberal Union	William Dring	5,236	19.1	+19.1
Total formal votes		27,429; 13,921 ballots	98.5	+0.5
Informal votes		209	1.5	−0.5
Turnout		14,130	60.6	+12.3
Party total votes
Labor		16,305	59.4	−3.4
Progressive Country		5,888	21.5	−15.7
Liberal Union		5,236	19.1	+19.1

=== Wooroora ===
1921 South Australian state election: Wooroora
Party	Candidate	Votes	%	±%
Liberal Union	James McLachlan (elected)	4,303	18.7	+0.9
Liberal Union	Richard Butler (elected)	4,137	18.0	+3.9
Liberal Union	Albert Robinson (elected)	3,595	15.7	+0.9
Labor	Allan Robertson	3,303	14.4	−1.2
Labor	Arthur McArthur	2,971	12.9	+12.9
Labor	Alfred Tonkin	2,884	12.6	+12.6
Independent	David James	929	4.0	+4.0
Independent	Ruphert Bowey	841	3.7	+3.7
Total formal votes		22,963; 7,890 ballots	99.2	+0.1
Informal votes		66	0.8	−0.1
Turnout		7,956	71.7	+6.5
Party total votes
Liberal Union		12,035	52.4	+5.7
Labor		9,158	39.9	−3.6
Independent	David James	929	4.0	+4.0
Independent	Ruphert Bowey	841	3.7	+3.7

=== Yorke Peninsula ===
1921 South Australian state election: Yorke Peninsula
Party	Candidate	Votes	%	±%
Liberal Union	Peter Allen (elected)	unopposed		
Liberal Union	Henry Tossell (elected)	unopposed		

== See also ==
- Candidates of the 1921 South Australian state election
- Members of the South Australian House of Assembly, 1921–1924
