= Candidates of the 1921 South Australian state election =

This is a list of candidates of the 1921 South Australian state election.

== Retiring MPs ==
=== Progressive Country ===
- Arthur Blackburn (Sturt) – retired

=== Independent ===
- John Albert Southwood (East Torrens) – retired

There had also been two resignations in the months leading up to the election which had remained unfilled. Murray Liberal MHA Angas Parsons resigned on 5 January 1921 due to his appointment to the judiciary. Sturt Liberal MHA Edward Vardon resigned on 15 February 1921 in order to nominate, successfully, for a vacancy in the Australian Senate.

== House of Assembly ==
Sitting members are shown in bold text. Successful candidates are marked with an asterisk.

Electorate	Labor candidates	Liberal candidates	Progressive Country candidates	FSA candidates	Independent candidates
Adelaide (3)	**Bill Denny***; **Bert Edwards***; John Gunn*		J. T. Mitchell		
Albert (2)	T. R. Knuckey; Joshua Pedlar	**William Angus**; **Richard Alfred O'Connor**		Malcolm McIntosh*; Frederick McMillan*	
Alexandra (3)	M. E. J. Hunt	**Herbert Hudd***; **George Laffer***; George Ritchie			Walter Furler
Barossa (3)	George Cooke; Leonard Hopkins; Edwin Parham	**Richard Butler***; **William Hague***; **Henry Crosby***		A. V. Nairn	
Burra Burra (3)	**Harry Buxton**; **Mick O'Halloran**; L. W. Willcott	Samuel Dickson*; **George Jenkins***	J. M. McDonald	Thomas Hawke*	Edward Craigie
East Torrens (3)	J. J. F. Flaherty; Herbert George; Leslie Claude Hunkin*	**Walter Hamilton***; Joseph Anthony Harper*; Albert Sutton	T. A. Buttery; **Frederick Coneybeer**; A. M. W. Jolly		
Flinders (2)	T. P. Lyons; M. J. Murphy	**James Moseley***		John Chapman*	H. E. Frick; Samuel Lindsay
Murray (3)	Bert Hoare; **Sid O'Flaherty**; Frank Staniford	John Godfree*; John Randell*; **Harry Dove Young***		J. H. Daniel	
Newcastle (2)	**Thomas Butterfield***; **William Harvey***	Edward Twopeny		John Smith	
North Adelaide (2)	Frederick Birrell*; Stanley Whitford*	C. P. Butler	**Edward Alfred Anstey**; **William David Ponder**		
Port Adelaide (2)	**John Price***; **John Stanley Verran***	L. E. Colley	J. M. Lambert		
Port Pirie (2)	**John Fitzgerald***; **Lionel Hill***				W. L. R. Blight
Stanley (2)	Even George; Albert Smith	**Henry Barwell***; **Robert Nicholls***		J. J. Aughey; H. V. Sargent	
Sturt (3)	T. W. Grealy; Tom Howard; Harry Kneebone	Ernest Anthoney*; George Hussey*; Herbert Richards*	A. E. Morris; **Thomas Hyland Smeaton**; John Vaughan		V. C. Blunden
West Torrens (2)	**Alfred Blackwell***; **John McInnes***	W. H. H. Dring	Henry Chesson		
Victoria (2)	Charles McHugh; Eric Shepherd	**Vernon Petherick***	**Peter Reidy***		
Wooroora (3)	Arthur McArthur; **Allan Robertson**; A. A. J. Tonkin	Richard Layton Butler*; **James McLachlan***; **Albert Robinson***			R. W. Bowey; David James
Wallaroo (2)	**John Pedler***; **Robert Richards***				John Verran
Yorke Peninsula (2)		**Peter Allen***; **Henry Tossell***			

== Legislative Council ==
Electorate	Labor candidates	Liberal candidates	Progressive Country candidates	Independent candidates
Central District No. 1 (2)	John Carr*; James Jelley*	G. A. Noble	J. L. Leal	
Central District No. 2 (2)	L. E. Fenton; Frederick Ward	John Herbert Cooke*; George Henry Prosser*	William Cole; A. R. Tuckett	Frederick Samuel Wallis
Midland District (2)		Walter Hannaford*; Thomas Pascoe*		
Northern District (2)	Sydney McHugh; M. B. Woods	John George Bice*; John Lewis*	W. O. Gale	
Southern District (2)		Robert Thomson Melrose*; Thomas McCallum*	W. D. Cowley	Alfred von Doussa
