= Members of the South Australian House of Assembly, 1921–1924 =

This is a list of members of the South Australian House of Assembly from 1921 to 1924, as elected at the 1921 state election:

Name	Party	Electorate	Term of office
Peter Allen	Liberal ^{[3]}	Yorke Peninsula	1902–1912, 1915–1925
Ernest Anthoney	Liberal ^{[3]}	Sturt	1921–1938
Henry Barwell	Liberal ^{[3]}	Stanley	1915–1925
Frederick Birrell	Labor	North Adelaide	1921–1933
Alfred Blackwell	Labor	West Torrens	1918–1938
Hon Sir Richard Butler	Liberal ^{[3]}	Barossa	1890–1924
Richard Layton Butler	Liberal ^{[3]}	Wooroora	1915–1918, 1921–1938
Thomas Butterfield	Labor	Newcastle	1915–1917, 1918–1933
John Chapman	Farmers and Settlers/ Country Party ^{[1]}	Flinders	1918–1924
Henry Crosby	Liberal ^{[3]}	Barossa	1917–1924, 1924–1930, 1933–1938
Bill Denny	Labor	Adelaide	1900–1905, 1906–1933
Samuel Dickson	Liberal ^{[3]}	Burra Burra	1921–1924
Bert Edwards	Labor	Adelaide	1917–1931
John Fitzgerald	Labor	Port Pirie	1918–1936
John Godfree	Liberal ^{[3]}	Murray	1921–1927
John Gunn	Labor	Adelaide	1915–1917, 1918–1926
William Hague	Liberal ^{[3]}	Barossa	1912–1924
Walter Hamilton	Liberal ^{[3]}	East Torrens	1917–1924, 1925–1930, 1933–1938
Joseph Anthony Harper	Liberal ^{[3]}	East Torrens	1921–1924
William Harvey	Labor	Newcastle	1918–1933
Thomas Hawke	Farmers and Settlers/ Country Party ^{[1]}	Burra Burra	1921–1924
Percy Heggaton ^{[2]}	Liberal ^{[3]}	Alexandra	1906–1915, 1923–1938
Lionel Hill	Labor	Port Pirie	1915–1917, 1918–1933
Herbert Hudd	Liberal ^{[3]}	Alexandra	1912–1915, 1920–1938, 1941–1948
Leslie Claude Hunkin	Labor	East Torrens	1921–1927
George Hussey	Liberal ^{[3]}	Sturt	1921–1924
George Jenkins	Liberal ^{[3]}	Burra Burra	1918–1924, 1927–1930, 1933–1956
George Laffer	Liberal ^{[3]}	Alexandra	1913–1933
John McInnes	Labor	West Torrens	1918–1950
Malcolm McIntosh	Farmers and Settlers/ Country Party ^{[1]}	Albert	1921–1959
James McLachlan	Liberal ^{[3]}	Wooroora	1918–1930
Frederick McMillan	Farmers and Settlers/ Country Party ^{[1]}	Albert	1921–1933
James Moseley	Liberal ^{[3]}	Flinders	1910–1933
Robert Nicholls	Liberal ^{[3]}	Stanley	1915–1956
John Pedler	Labor	Wallaroo	1918–1938
Vernon Petherick	Liberal ^{[3]}	Victoria	1918–1924; 1941–1945
John Price	Labor	Port Adelaide	1915–1925
John Randell	Liberal ^{[3]}	Murray	1921–1924
Peter Reidy	National/ Liberal ^{[3]}	Victoria	1915–1932
Herbert Richards	Liberal ^{[3]}	Sturt	1921–1930
Robert Richards	Labor	Wallaroo	1918–1949
George Ritchie ^{[2]}	Liberal ^{[3]}	Alexandra	1902–1922
Albert Robinson	Liberal ^{[3]}	Wooroora	1915–1924, 1934–1943
Henry Tossell	Liberal ^{[3]}	Yorke Peninsula	1915–1930
John Stanley Verran	Labor	Port Adelaide	1918–1924, 1925–1927
Stanley Whitford	Labor	North Adelaide	1921–1927
Harry Dove Young	Liberal ^{[3]}	Murray	1912–1927

^{1} The parliamentary wing of the Farmers and Settlers Association had been referred to by a variety of labels prior to this term of parliament, and had contested the 1921 election independently of the National-dominated "Progressive Country Party". After the 1921 election, the party formally adopted the "Country Party" name, consistent with their federal counterparts.
^{2} Alexandra Liberal MHA George Ritchie resigned on 2 November 1922. Liberal candidate Percy Heggaton won the resulting by-election on 20 January 1923.
^{3} The Liberal Union and the National Party merged in October 1923 to form the Liberal Federation.
