= Albert Robinson (Australian politician) =

Australian politician

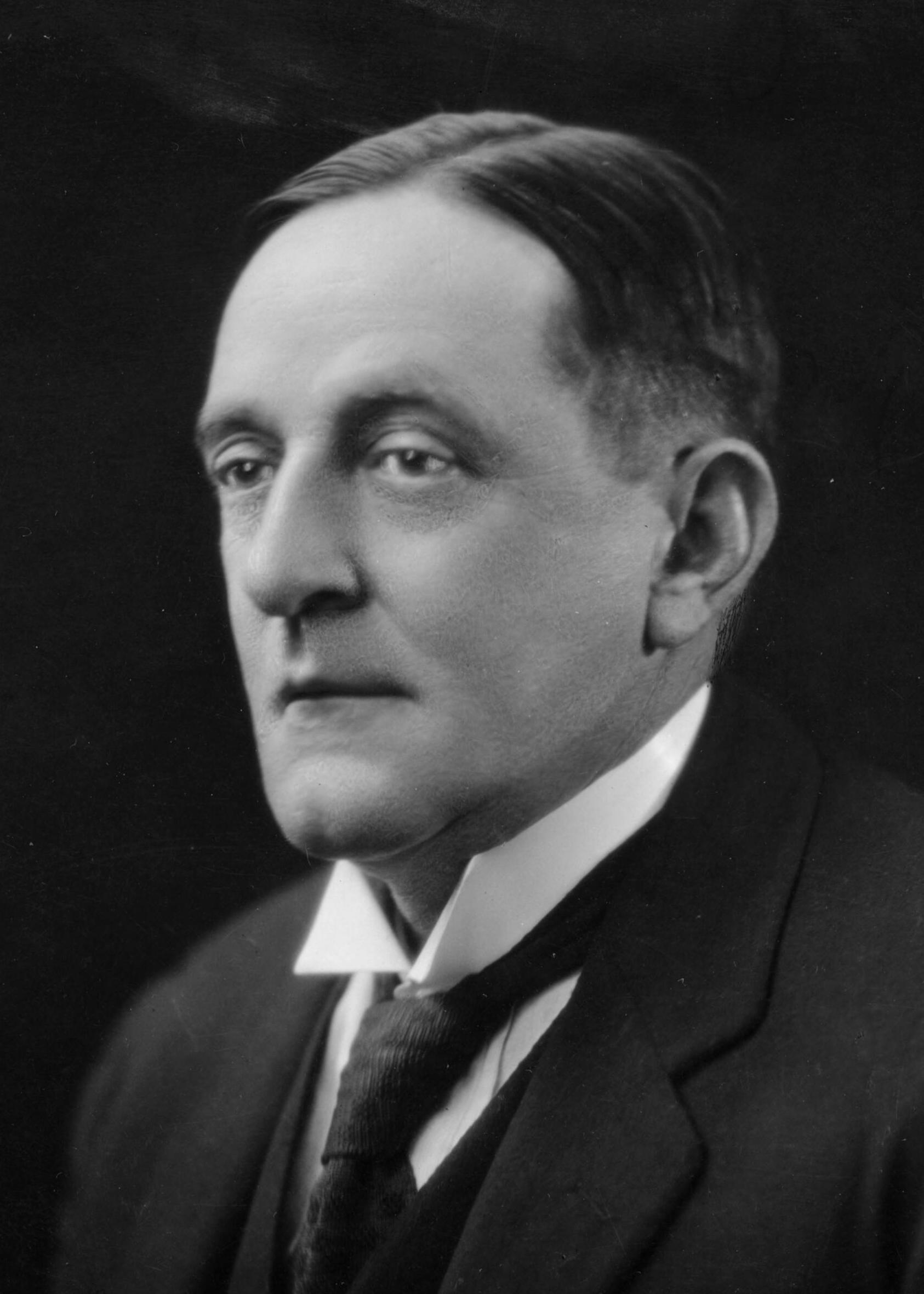

Senator for South Australia
- In office 18 April 1928 – 16 November 1928
- Preceded by: Sir Henry Barwell

Personal details
- Born: 20 May 1877 Lyndoch, South Australia
- Died: 25 May 1943 (aged 66)
- Party: Liberal Union (1915–1923); Liberal Federation (1923–1924); Nationalist (1928); Independent (1934–1943)

Albert William Robinson (20 May 1877 – 25 May 1943) was an Australian Senator and long serving member of the South Australian House of Assembly.

Born in Lyndoch, South Australia to George Septimus Robinson, publican and grazier, and his wife Lucy, Robinson was educated in Clare and Roseworthy Agricultural College, where he studied viticulture, before commencing work as a pastoralist on his father's property "Werocata" near Balaklava.

Robinson married Edith Laine in 1904; the marriage produced three daughters and three sons.

His stature in the area led to his election as President of the Balaklava-Dalkey Agricultural Society, Chairman of the Balaklava Racing Club and vice-president of the Farmers and Producers Political Union. Robinson used this local prominence to good effect by gaining Liberal Union pre-selection for the South Australian House of Assembly Electoral district of Wooroora at the 1915 election. During his time in parliament, Robinson chaired the influential Government Railways Standing Committee and through this influence in combination with the wealth he had gained from farming, Robinson was considered a possible future Premier of South Australia.

He surprisingly lost his seat as a Liberal Federation candidate at the 1924 election, when the Labor Party swept to power. Robinson remained involved in Liberal politics and was appointed by the South Australian parliament in April 1928 to the senate position vacated by Sir Henry Barwell upon the latter's resignation to become South Australian Agent-General in London. Robinson sat with the Nationalist Party of Australia (the federal equivalent of the South Australian-based Liberal Federation) in the Senate for eight months before his defeat at the 1928 federal election.

He was a strong supporter of regional development (he had been heavily involved in the development of Kangaroo Island in the late 1930s), an increase in the birth rate and thrift.

Angry with his perceived poor treatment by the Liberal Federation, Robinson resigned from the party and again ran for Wooroora but as an independent candidate at a by-election in 1934. Although he could not find a scrutineer in some towns and had no one attend a campaign meeting in another town, Robinson surprisingly won the by-election and, following an electoral redistribution, was comfortably elected as the member for the state seat of Gouger at the 1938 election.

He was one of 14 of 39 lower house MPs at the 1938 election to be elected as an independent, which as a grouping won 40 percent of the primary vote, more than either of the major parties. Tom Stott was the de facto leader of the independent caucus within parliament.

Following re-election at the 1941 election, Robinson died in office in 1943, survived by his widow, three daughters and one son. A son, George Albert, committed suicide in 1937 after shooting two of his infant children.

South Australian House of Assembly
Preceded by Oscar Duhst; Frederick Young; David James	Member for Wooroora; 1915–1924; With: Butler / McLachlan; James / Robertson / Butler	Succeeded by James McLachlan; R. L. Butler; Allan Robertson
Preceded by Archie Cameron	Member for Wooroora; 1934–1938; With: Butler; Samuel Dennison	District abolished
New district	Member for Gouger; 1938–1943	Succeeded by Horace Bowden
