= Richard Layton Butler =

Australian politician (1885–1966)

The Honourable Sir Richard Butler KCMG
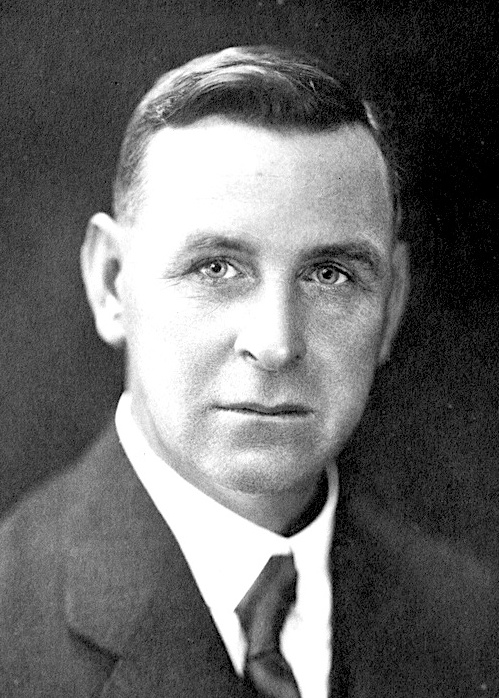

31st Premier of South Australia
- In office 18 April 1933 – 5 November 1938
- Monarchs: George V Edward VIII; George VI
- Governor: Earl of Gowrie; Lord Dugan
- Preceded by: Robert Richards
- Succeeded by: Sir Thomas Playford
- In office 8 April 1927 – 17 April 1930
- Monarch: George V
- Governor: Sir Tom Bridges; Earl of Gowrie
- Preceded by: Lionel Hill
- Succeeded by: Lionel Hill

Leader of Opposition in South Australia
- In office 17 April 1930 – 18 April 1933
- Preceded by: Lionel Hill
- Succeeded by: Andrew Lacey
- In office 17 December 1925 – 8 April 1927
- Preceded by: Henry Barwell
- Succeeded by: Lionel Hill

Leader of the Liberal and Country League
- In office 9 June 1932 – 3 November 1938
- Preceded by: party established
- Succeeded by: Thomas Playford IV

Treasurer of South Australia
- In office 18 April 1933 – 5 November 1938
- Premier: Himself
- Preceded by: Robert Richards
- Succeeded by: Thomas Playford IV
- In office 8 April 1927 – 17 April 1930
- Premier: Himself
- Preceded by: Lionel Hill
- Succeeded by: Lionel Hill

Member for Light
- In office 19 March 1938 – 5 November 1938
- Preceded by: Constituency Established
- Succeeded by: Herbert Michael

Member for Wooroora
- In office 9 April 1921 – 19 March 1938
- Preceded by: Allan Robertson
- Succeeded by: Constituency Abolished
- In office 27 March 1915 – 6 April 1918
- Preceded by: Oscar Duhst
- Succeeded by: James McLachlan

Personal details
- Born: 31 March 1885 Gawler, South Australia, Australia
- Died: 21 January 1966 (aged 80) Adelaide, South Australia, Australia
- Party: Liberal Union (1915–1922); Liberal Federation (1922–1932); LCL (1932–1966)

Sir Richard Layton Butler KCMG (31 March 1885 – 21 January 1966) was the 31st Premier of South Australia, serving two disjunct terms in office: from 1927 to 1930, and again from 1933 to 1938.

== Early life ==
Born on a farm (Note: Yattalunga (or Yatalunga), previously owned by his great-uncle Philip Butler, and being managed by his father for the new owners Joseph Barritt (1816–1881) and his son Frank (1863–1918).) near Gawler, South Australia, the son of former South Australian Premier Sir Richard Butler and his wife Helena (née Layton) Butler studied at Adelaide Agricultural School before becoming a grazier at Kapunda and marrying Maude Draper on 4 January 1908.

== Politics ==
=== Early career ===
Inheriting his father's interest in politics, Butler joined the conservative Liberal Union while young and was elected to the South Australian House of Assembly for the rural electorate of Wooroora at the 1915 election, serving in the House alongside his father. Butler would lose his seat at the 1918 election (due to his support for conscription) but regained Wooroora at the 1921 election and retained the seat comfortably for the next seventeen years. He followed most of the Liberal Union into the Liberal Federation in 1922 when it joined forces with several pro-conscription Labor Party members.

Butler made infrequent speeches in parliament and was in the habit of accidentally offending people through his choice of words. He was, however, known for his convivial style outside parliament and his equally pugnacious style inside the house. In 1925 he became Liberal Federation party whip, becoming party leader (and therefore Opposition leader) shortly afterward following the retirement of former premier Henry Barwell from politics.

=== Premier (1927–1930) ===
At the 1927 election, Butler successfully led the Liberal Federation to victory, winning 23 seats in the 46 seat Assembly, with the coalition Country Party winning five seats, the Labor Party 16, the Independent Protestant Labor Party one and an independent winning a seat. In becoming Premier (as well as Treasurer of South Australia and Minister of Railways), Butler and his father became the first (and so far only) father-son combination to serve as Premier of South Australia.

In government, Butler passed the Drought Relief and Debt Adjustment Acts to assist drought-stricken farmers but his reaction to other industries hit by the Great Depression in Australia was less sympathetic; believing that the way out of the Depression was for South Australians to work harder, Butler dealt heavily with a waterside workers strike in 1929 and cut funding to many government departments.

=== Defeat and party merger ===
By the 1930 election, South Australia faced severe drought as well as the Depression, leaving Butler to warn of hard times ahead and further belt-tightening required. Labor leader Lionel Hill, on the other hand, promised a golden future. Not surprisingly, the Liberal Federation was reduced to 13 seats and the Country Party two as Labor swept to power and Butler returned to the opposition benches.

The loss turned out to be a blessing in disguise to Butler, as Labor was forced to deal with the Depression. After the Hill government gave its support to the Premiers' Plan, the state executive expelled the cabinet and its supporters. The Hill cabinet formed the Parliamentary Labor Party, also known as Premiers' Plan Labor, which had to rely on support from Butler's Opposition to stay in office.

Meanwhile, Butler set to work on his pet project: namely, the amalgamation of the Liberal Federation and the Country Party. The drive to merge South Australia's conservative forces gained further momentum when the state's non-Labor candidates ran in the 1931 federal election as the Emergency Committee of South Australia, which took all but one of the state's lower house seats and all of the state's available Senate seats. A year later, the amalgamation was made final, resulting in the Liberal and Country League with Butler as leader.

=== Premier (1933–1938) ===
The newly united LCL went into the 1933 election as unbackable favourites following the self-destruction of the South Australian ALP over its handling of the Depression. Hill resigned nine months before the election and was succeeded by Robert Richards, who faced the nearly impossible task of holding on to power against the LCL. With the Labor vote split three ways—the official ALP, Premiers' Plan Labor, and Lang Labor—the LCL won a resounding victory, taking 29 seats against only 13 for the three competing Labor factions combined. In addition to becoming Premier, Butler served as his own Treasurer and Immigration Minister.

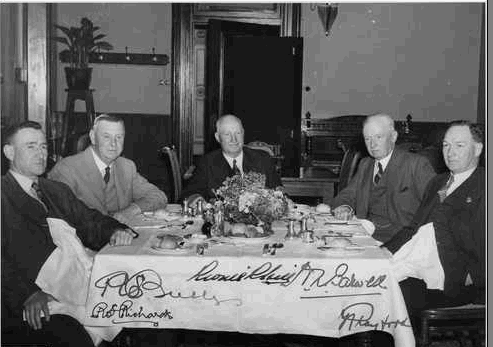
Former South Australian premiers (from left) Robert Richards, Sir Richard Butler, Lionel Hill and Sir Henry Barwell meet with then Premier Tom Playford in 1940

In Canberra, Butler achieved fame for his tough bargaining skills, which resulted in extra grants for South Australia; through this funding, and a reduction in government spending, South Australia was the first state since the start of the Depression to balance its budget. He was also known in Canberra as a fierce opponent of federal control, strongly opposing the proposed Commonwealth wheat pool and the rationalisation of butter production.

Butler's term in office also saw the founding of the South Australian Housing Trust, designed to build cheap homes for those affected by the Depression and the successful enticing of BHP to build the Whyalla Steelworks, and General Motors Holden to maintain its Adelaide base, as well as major changes to the structure of Parliament. The parliamentary term was expanded from three years to five years, and the House of Assembly was changed from a 46-member chamber elected from multi-member districts to a 39-member chamber elected from single-member districts. This had the effect of increasing the already significant rural overweighting that was written into the state constitution, which called for two rural seats for every one seat in Adelaide. The resulting malapportionment later became known as the Playmander.

Not all was rosy for Butler, though. The conditions laid down by the Country Party as part of agreeing to the merger left former Country Party politicians with more influence in the LCL than their numbers in parliament would have otherwise merited. Not only was Butler forced to give a ministerial post to Country Party power broker Percy Blesing, but former state Country Party leader Archie Cameron was handed the federal seat of Barker. Butler struggled to control rural members of the LCL - some of these members publicly disagreed with Butler over key issues. This internal opposition was magnified by Butler's refusal to introduce compulsory religious education into state schools or to ban drinking and gambling, which led church and temperance groups to launch a moral crusade against Butler, and which prompted conservative LCL members to consider dumping Butler as leader.

Despite this, Butler held on to his position and led the LCL to the 1938 election. The LCL lost several seats, but formed a minority government with the support of independents. Also at this election, the first with single-member district, he was elected for the seat of Light.

=== Attempted move to federal politics and later activities ===
Mounting internal LCL displeasure led Butler to consider switching to federal politics. An opportunity arose for such a move in 1938, following the death in an aeroplane crash of Charles Hawker, the United Australia Party MP for the federal seat of Wakefield. Butler gained pre-selection for the 1938 Wakefield by-election and resigned his position as Premier and his seat in parliament on 5 November 1938, to be replaced as Premier by Thomas Playford IV. At the time of his resignation, Butler was the longest-serving Premier in South Australian history.

Butler went into the by-election as a heavy favorite; on paper Wakefield was a safely conservative seat with a UAP/LCL majority of 13.1 percent. However, in a shock result, Butler lost the by-election after independent Percy Quirke's preferences flowed overwhelmingly to Labor challenger Sydney McHugh. This allowed McHugh to take the seat on a swing of 20 percent. Although he continued to seek federal pre-selection for the LCL, internal party opponents thwarted him. Instead, after being knighted in 1939, Butler was first appointed by Playford to the critical wartime positions of Director of Emergency Road Transport and Chair of the Liquid Fuel Control Board and later as a Director of the Electricity Trust of South Australia.

Labor MP Mark Butler is Richard Layton Butler's great grandson.

== Death ==
Butler died in Adelaide of cerebro-vascular disease in 1966. He received a state funeral.

== Family ==
Butler married Maude Isabel Draper (1883–1972) in 1908. Their children included:

- Mary Helen Butler (1908–1993) married John Neil McEwin (1907–1993) in 1931. John was the son of lawyer George McEwin (1873–1945)
- Jean Kate Butler (1909– ) married Ian Eversley Thomas (1902–1970) in 1937
- Richard Charles Layton Butler (30 March 1917 – 1987) married Patricia Marie Tardrew (1920–1998) in 1944

Butler is the great-grandfather of Mark Butler, a federal government minister for the Australian Labor Party.

== Sources ==
- Australian Dictionary of Biography
- The Flinders History of South Australia – Political History, ed. D. Jaensch (1986), Wakefield Press, Netley. ISBN 0-949268-52-6

Political offices
Preceded by Henry Barwell	Leader of the Opposition of South Australia; 1925–1927	Succeeded by Lionel Hill
Preceded by Lionel Hill	Premier of South Australia; 1927 – 1930	Succeeded by Lionel Hill
Preceded by Lionel Hill	Treasurer of South Australia; 1927 – 1930	Succeeded by Lionel Hill
Preceded by Lionel Hill	Leader of the Opposition of South Australia; 1930–1933	Succeeded by Andrew Lacey
Preceded by Robert Richards	Premier of South Australia; 1933 – 1938	Succeeded by Thomas Playford IV
Preceded by Robert Richards	Treasurer of South Australia; 1933 – 1938	Succeeded by Thomas Playford IV
Parliament of South Australia
Preceded by Oscar Duhst	Member for Wooroora; 1915–1918; Served alongside: David James, Albert Robinson	Succeeded by James McLachlan
Preceded by Allan Robertson	Member for Wooroora; 1921–1938; Served alongside: James McLachlan, Samuel Dennison, Albert Robinson, Allan Robertson, Archie Cameron	District abolished
District reformed Previous members: Jenkin Coles; Friedrich Paech	Member for Light; 1938	Succeeded by Herbert Michael
Party political offices
Preceded by Henry Barwell	Leader of the Liberal Federation (SA); 1925 – 1932	Party disbanded
New political party	Leader of the Liberal and Country League (SA); 1932 – 1938	Succeeded by Thomas Playford IV
