= Frederick Coneybeer =

Australian politician

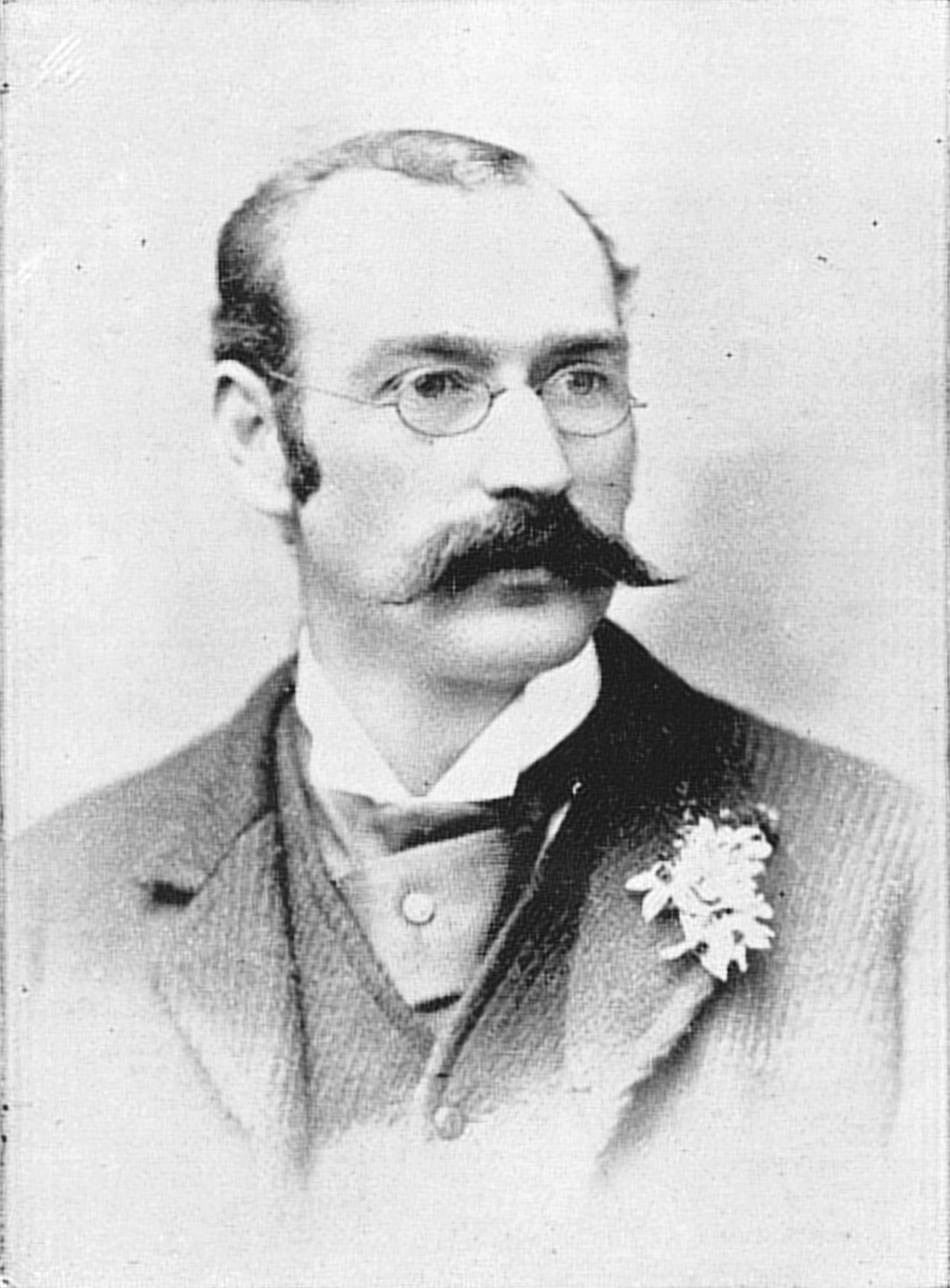

Frederick William Coneybeer (27 September 1859 – 30 May 1950) was an Australian politician. He was a member of the South Australian House of Assembly from 1893 to 1921 and from 1924 to 1930, representing the electorates of East Torrens (1893–1902, 1915–1921, 1924–1930) and Torrens (1902–1915).

Coneybeer was born in Clifton in Bristol, England. His family migrated to Sydney, thence to Orange, New South Wales in 1865, where he was educated, then learned the trade of collar maker from his father and for around ten years followed this trade. In 1880 he moved to Melbourne, where he worked for a while, then to Adelaide, South Australia in 1881, where he found employment with J. A. Holden & Co. He was an active member of the Saddlers' Trade Society, and filled most positions in that Union. Coneybeer was elected as a member of the United Labor Party in 1893, and served as state Minister for Education under Thomas Price (1908–1909) and John Verran (1910–1912). In 1915, when Labor regained office under Crawford Vaughan, he was made Speaker of the House of Assembly.

In 1917, the Labor Party split over conscription, and Coneybeer followed Vaughan and Verran into the new National Party. The Vaughan government soon fell, and the National Party immediately entered into a coalition government with their former rivals, the Liberal Union, with the National Party as junior partner. Coneybeer remained Speaker throughout, only losing office when lost his seat in 1921, as the coalition split and the National Party was resoundingly defeated statewide. The Liberal and National parties merged to form the Liberal Federation in 1923, and Coneybeer was elected to his old seat as a Liberal at the 1924 election. He was re-elected in 1927, but lost his seat to a Labor candidate in 1930.

Political offices
Preceded by Ministry recreated	Minister for Education (South Australia); 1908–1909	Succeeded by Archibald Peake
Preceded by Archibald Peake	Minister for Education (South Australia); 1910–1912	Succeeded by Archibald Peake
Preceded by Laurence O'Loughlin	Speaker of the House of Assembly; 1915–1921	Succeeded by Richard Butler
South Australian House of Assembly
Preceded by Edwin Thomas Smith	Member for East Torrens; 1893–1902; Served alongside: Playford, Packham, Darling	District abolished
New district	Member for Torrens; 1902–1915; Served alongside: Price, Ryan, Parsons	District abolished
District recreated	Member for East Torrens; 1915–1921; Served alongside: Hamilton, Hill, Southwood	Succeeded by Joseph Anthony Harper; Leslie Claude Hunkin
Preceded by Walter Hamilton; Joseph Anthony Harper	Member for East Torrens; 1924–1930; Served alongside: Hamilton, Hunkin, Kneebone, Sutton	District abolished
