= 1895 Melbourne Cup =

Annual horse race in Victoria, Australia

- Melbourne Cup
- Location: Flemington Racecourse
- Date: 5 November 1895
- Distance: 2 miles
- Winning horse: Auraria
- Winning time: 3:29.00
- Final odds: 33/1
- Jockey: John Stevenson
- Trainer: John H. Hill
- Owner: David James
- Surface: Turf
- Attendance: 90,000

The 1895 Melbourne Cup was a two-mile handicap horse race which took place on Tuesday, 5 November 1895.

This year was the thirty-fifth running of the Melbourne Cup. American author Mark Twain attended the race as part of an adventure and research project for his 1897 book Following the Equator. Twain write "Nowhere in the world have I encountered a festival of people that has such a magnificent appeal to the whole nation. The Cup astonishes me. The Melbourne Cup is the Australasian National Day. It would be difficult to overstate its importance. It overshadows all other holidays and specialised days of whatever sort in that congeries of colonies. Overshadows them? I might almost say it blots them out."

This is the list of placegetters for the 1895 Melbourne Cup.

Place	Name	Jockey	Trainer	Owner
1	Auraria	John Stevenson	John H. Hill	David James
2	Hova	Jas Hayes	A Davies	
3	Burrabari	S. G. Thomas	J Redfearn	

== See also ==
- Melbourne Cup
- List of Melbourne Cup winners
- Victoria Racing Club
