= Plain Dealer (disambiguation) =

The Plain Dealer is a newspaper in Cleveland, Ohio.

Plain Dealer, Plaindealer, and variations may also refer to:

== Publications ==
=== Australia ===
- The Plain Dealer (Kadina), newspaper in South Australia (1894–1926)

=== Canada ===
- Souris Plaindealer, newspaper in Manitoba (1892–2020)

=== United States ===
- Alturas Plaindealer, newspaper in California from the mid-nineteenth century to 1952
- Detroit Plaindealer, newspaper in Michigan, serving the African American community (1883–1894)
- Cresco Times Plain Dealer, newspaper in Iowa
- Indiana Plain Dealer, newspaper in Indiana
- Ouray County Plaindealer, newspaper in Colorado, established in 1877
- Topeka Plaindealer, newspaper in Kansas, serving the African American community (1899–1958)

=== United Kingdom ===
- The Plain Dealer (periodical), literary magazine published in London (1724–1725)

== Theatre ==
- The Plain Dealer (play), theatrical play first performed in 1676

== See also ==
- Plain Dealer Pavilion
