= Charles Hussey =

Charles Hussey may refer to:

- Sir Charles Hussey, 1st Baronet (1626–1664), English politician
- Sir Charles Hussey, 2nd Baronet (died 1680) of the Hussey baronets
- Charles Henry Hussey (1832–1899), South Australian politician
