= John Carr (Australian politician, born 1871) =

Australian trade unionist and politician (1871–1929)

The Honourable John Carr
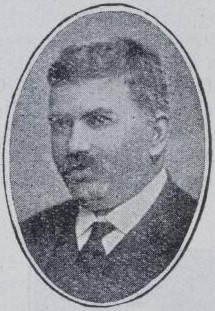
- John Carr

Member of the South Australian Legislative Council
- In office 12 March 1915 – 6 June 1929
- Succeeded by: Stanley R. Whitford
- Constituency: Central District No. 1

Personal details
- Born: 15 July 1871 Port Adelaide, Colony of South Australia
- Died: 6 June 1929 (aged 57)
- Party: Labor
- Children: Mrs A. Antonsen; George Carr; John T. Carr
- Occupation: Trade unionist Waterside worker

John Carr (15 July 1871 – 6 June 1929) was a union leader and politician in South Australia.

== History ==
John Carr, M.L.C., was born at Port Adelaide a son of Thomas Carr, who worked on the wharves and was one of the founders of the Working Men's Association in 1872. He was educated at the local public school.

== Union activity and politics ==
At an early age he took an active interest in the Labor movement, and was on several occasions president of the Working Men's Association, then secretary, holding that post for twelve years. During his period as an official there was little industrial disputation in the workplace, largely due to his tact and good judgment. He was delegate from that body to the United Labor Party (later the Australian Labor Party), the Eight Hours Committee, and the Trades and Labor Council. He joined the Labor Party when it was established at Port Adelaide, and held the position of assistant secretary when George Duffield was secretary. He was also at one time secretary of the Port Adelaide Storemen's Union, local secretary of the Federated Marine Stewards' Union, and secretary of the Port Adelaide Co-operative Accident Relief Society. In 1915 he was elected unopposed for Central District No. 1 in the Legislative Council, and held that position until his death.

In later years he was treasurer of the Labor Party, and as a member of the Legislative Council represented his district on various commissions and committees, the last being the Public Works Committee.

== Other interests ==
Carr was involved in various sports. In his younger days, he was a good footballer and represented junior clubs in various associations. He was also president of the Port Adelaide Football Association, and was instrumental as secretary of the West Torrens Football Club that they became a leading member of the South Australian National Football League, on which he represented the club for a term, and was elected a life member.

== Family ==
John Carr left a widow, one daughter. Mrs. A. Antonsen, of Dale Street, Port Adelaide, and two sons: George Carr of Dale Street, Port Adelaide, and John T. Carr, of Albert Park.

His brother, William H. Carr of Albert Park, was for several years a leading amateur swimmer at Port Adelaide. Another brother, Frederick Alfred Carr of Finsbury Park, was secretary of the Port Adelaide branch of the Waterside Workers' Federation, and mentioned as a possible replacement on the Legislative Council, a safe Labor seat, but it was Stanley R. Whitford who won the plebiscite. Other brothers were Charles T. Carr of Peterhead, Thomas Carr of Pennington, Robert Carr of Bowden, Arthur, George, and Aleck Carr of Pennington, and David Carr of Peterhead.
