= Plain Dealer (Kadina) =

Defunct newspaper in Kadina, Australia

The Plain Dealer was a weekly Saturday newspaper in Kadina, South Australia, operating from 1894 until 1926 as a smaller competitor to the Kadina and Wallaroo Times.

== History ==
Yorke's Peninsula Plain Dealer was established in August 1894 by John Albert Southwood and George Spring, who had previously managed the Katoomba Times in New South Wales together. It operated out of an office in Goyder Street. After three years, on 6 March 1897, the name was simplified to The Plain Dealer. The owners also opened a subsidiary mid-week weekly newspaper, the Copper Age in August 1906, with content similar to the Dealer, but it was closed in December 1908.

Southwood and Spring then continued the newspaper out of the Kadina office until 1917, when Southwood, now a member of parliament, left the partnership. Spring then managed the newspaper alone until 8 January 1926, when the newspaper abruptly closed, likely due to the drop in circulation following the closure of the Wallaroo Mines.

== Digitisation ==
The National Library of Australia has digitised photographic copies of early issues which may be accessed via Trove.
