= David Packham =

Australian politician

David Packham (9 April 1832 – 4 April 1912) was an Australian politician. He was a member of the South Australian House of Assembly from 1894 to 1896, representing the electorate of East Torrens. He had earlier been a Town of Kensington and Norwood councillor for 22 years, and was mayor from 1878 to 1880.

Packham was born in Sussex, England, and his family migrated to South Australia when he was seven, arriving in Holdfast Bay on the Moffat on 16 December 1839. The family resided for some time on the land that would later house the General Post Office, Adelaide. His father, William Packham, acquired the first flour mill in South Australia at Burnside. Packham worked for his father for several years, before going into farming, first at Burnside and later at Magill. He also went into the road-making business, opening the quarry at Stonyfell. In 1851, he went to the Victorian gold diggings for a period. During his time at Burnside, Packham was a District Council of Burnside councillor for six years.

In 1864, Packham moved to Kensington, and established a chaff mill. It was severely damaged by fire soon after becoming operational, but he was able to rebuild with the insurance money and operated the business until his retirement. In business, he also served as chairman of directors of the Ethel Silver Mine at Silverton and the Balhannah Mining Company. He was heavily involved with the Royal Agricultural and Horticultural Society, serving on its council, as a judge and steward for the Royal Adelaide Show, and eventually becoming a life member. He was also a trustee of the Loyal Norwood Lodge of Oddfellows.

Packham was elected as a Kensington and Norwood councillor in 1865. In 1878, he was elected mayor after a closely fought contest with Richard Horace Wigg. His mayoralty saw, among other achievements, the introduction of street signs in the municipality. He was re-elected as mayor unopposed in 1879, and then served again as a councillor until retiring in 1890. G. W. Gooden and T. L. Moore's 1903 book Fifty Years' History of the Town of Kensington and Norwood described him as the "Grand Old Man of Kensington".

Packham contested the House of Assembly seat of East Torrens at the 1890 election but finished third behind Thomas Playford and Sir Edwin Thomas Smith. He contested the 1893 election and was again defeated; while he had the nominal support of the Trades and Labor Council in 1890, he had run in 1893 with the support of the conservative National Defence League. He entered the House of Assembly on his third attempt when he won the 1894 by-election, following the appointment of Playford as Agent-General in London. He suffered a serious injury while a parliamentarian when his buggy capsized and spent several months recuperating, though he eventually made a full recovery. His state career was to be short-lived, as he was defeated at the 1896 colonial election, finishing fourth in the two-member electorate and losing his seat to ally John Darling Jr. Both Packham and Darling were associated with the National Defence League.

His son, William, later became a successful businessman and also served as a Kensington and Norwood councillor.

Civic offices
Preceded by Samuel Dening Glyde	Mayor of Kensington and Norwood; 1878–1880	Succeeded by Thomas Caterer
South Australian House of Assembly
Preceded by Thomas Playford	Member for East Torrens; 1894–1896; With: Frederick Coneybeer	Succeeded by Frederick Coneybeer; John Darling Jr.
