= Auraria (horse) =

Australian-bred Thoroughbred racehorse

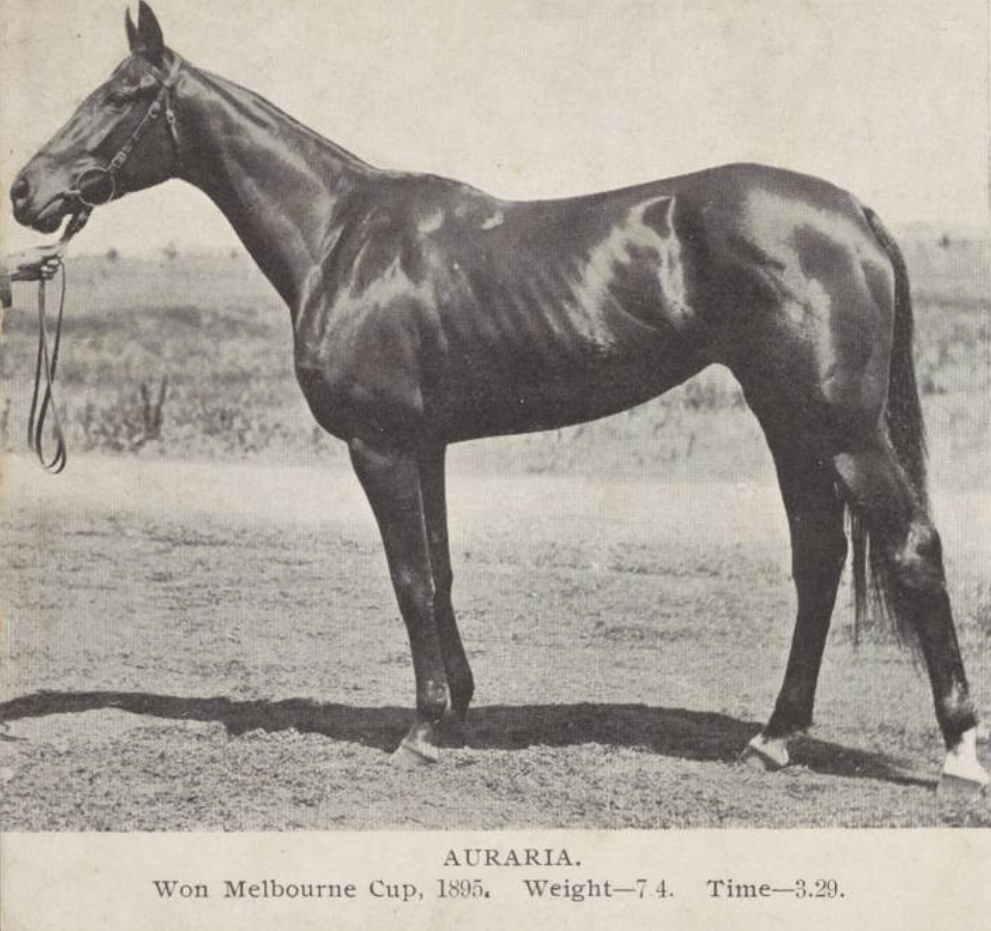
- Sire: Trenton (NZ)
- Grandsire: Musket (GB)
- Dam: Aura
- Damsire: Richmond
- Sex: Mare
- Foaled: 1892
- Country: Australia
- Breeder: St Albans stud, Geelong
- Owner: David James
- Trainer: John Hill

Major wins
- South Australian Derby (1895); Melbourne Cup (1895); VRC Oaks (1895); Fisher Plate (1895)

Honours
- Auraria Stakes

Auraria (foaled 1892) was an Australian racehorse that won the 1895 Melbourne Cup.

== Racing career ==
Auraria was bred at St Albans stud in Victoria and bought for 280 guineas by David James of Kapunda.

She raced 10 times as a two-year-old for six wins, three seconds and a fourth.

As a three-year-old she had only seven starts, winning the Melbourne Cup, South Australian Derby, VRC Oaks and the Fisher Plate (dead heat with Wallace). Her other results were third in the Victoria Derby to Wallace and Osculator just three days before her Melbourne Cup win and two fourths. Her final race was the 1897 Fisher Plate when she finished last in the field of four.

== Stud career ==
Auraria was bred to Pistol and produced several leading broodmares, including Princess Aura and Little Joan.

== Pedigree ==
Pedigree of Auraria
Sire Trenton (NZ)	Musket (GB)	Toxophilite	Longbow
Sire Trenton (NZ)	Musket (GB)	Toxophilite	Legerdemain
Sire Trenton (NZ)	Musket (GB)	West Australian mare	West Australian
Sire Trenton (NZ)	Musket (GB)	West Australian mare	Brown Bess
Sire Trenton (NZ)	Frailty	Goldsbrough	Fireworks (AUS)
Sire Trenton (NZ)	Frailty	Goldsbrough	Sylvia (AUS)
Sire Trenton (NZ)	Frailty	Flora McIvor (AUS)	New Warrior (GB)
Sire Trenton (NZ)	Frailty	Flora McIvor (AUS)	Io (NZ)
Dam Aura	Richmond	Maribyrnong (AUS)	Fisherman (GB)
Dam Aura	Richmond	Maribyrnong (AUS)	Rose De Florence (GB)
Dam Aura	Richmond	The Faun (AUS)	The Premier (GB)
Dam Aura	Richmond	The Faun (AUS)	Melesina (IRE)
Dam Aura	Instep	Lord Clifden	Newminster (GB)
Dam Aura	Instep	Lord Clifden	The Slave (GB)
Dam Aura	Instep	Sandal	Stockwell (GB)
Dam Aura	Instep	Sandal	Lady Evelyn (GB)
