= Walter Hamilton (politician) =

Australian politician

Walter Alfred Hamilton (10 March 1863 – 1 September 1955) was an Australian politician. He was a public accountant, auditor and general manager before entering politics.

Hamilton was born near Glenelg, South Australia and educated at Glenelg Grammar School. He was a Labor member of the Victorian Legislative Assembly for Sandhurst from 1894 until 1900, when he fell out with Labor and ran for re-election and lost as a supporter of Premier Allan McLean. He was re-elected to his old seat as an unaligned candidate in 1902, but was defeated for the new seat of Bendigo West in 1904 after his old seat was abolished.

He was elected to the South Australian House of Assembly in 1917, winning a 1917 by-election for the seat of East Torrens for the Liberal Union. He was re-elected in 1918 and 1921, but was defeated in 1924. He won a 1925 by-election, was re-elected in 1927, but defeated again in 1930. He was again elected in the Liberal and Country League landslide at the 1933 election, but contested and lost Norwood in 1938 after the abolition of East Torrens.

Parliament of Victoria
Preceded by Alfred Shrapnell Bailes	Member for Sandhurst; 1894–1900	Succeeded by Daniel Barnet Lazarus
Preceded by Daniel Barnet Lazarus	Member for Sandhurst; 1902–1904	Succeeded by Electorate abolished
Parliament of South Australia
Preceded by Lionel Hill	Member for East Torrens; 1917–1924	Succeeded by Leslie Claude Hunkin; Harry Kneebone; Frederick Coneybeer
Preceded by Harry Kneebone	Member for East Torrens; 1925–1930	Succeeded by Beasley Kearney; Arthur McArthur; Frank Nieass
Preceded by Beasley Kearney; Arthur McArthur; Frank Nieass	Member for East Torrens; 1933–1938	Succeeded by Electorate abolished
