= James McLachlan Sr. =

Australian politician

James McLachlan Sr. (16 July 1842 – 5 October 1904) was an Australian politician who represented the South Australian House of Assembly multi-member seat of Wooroora from 1893 to 1902. He represented the National Defence League in 1893 and 1896.
