= John Chapman (Australian politician) =

Australian politician

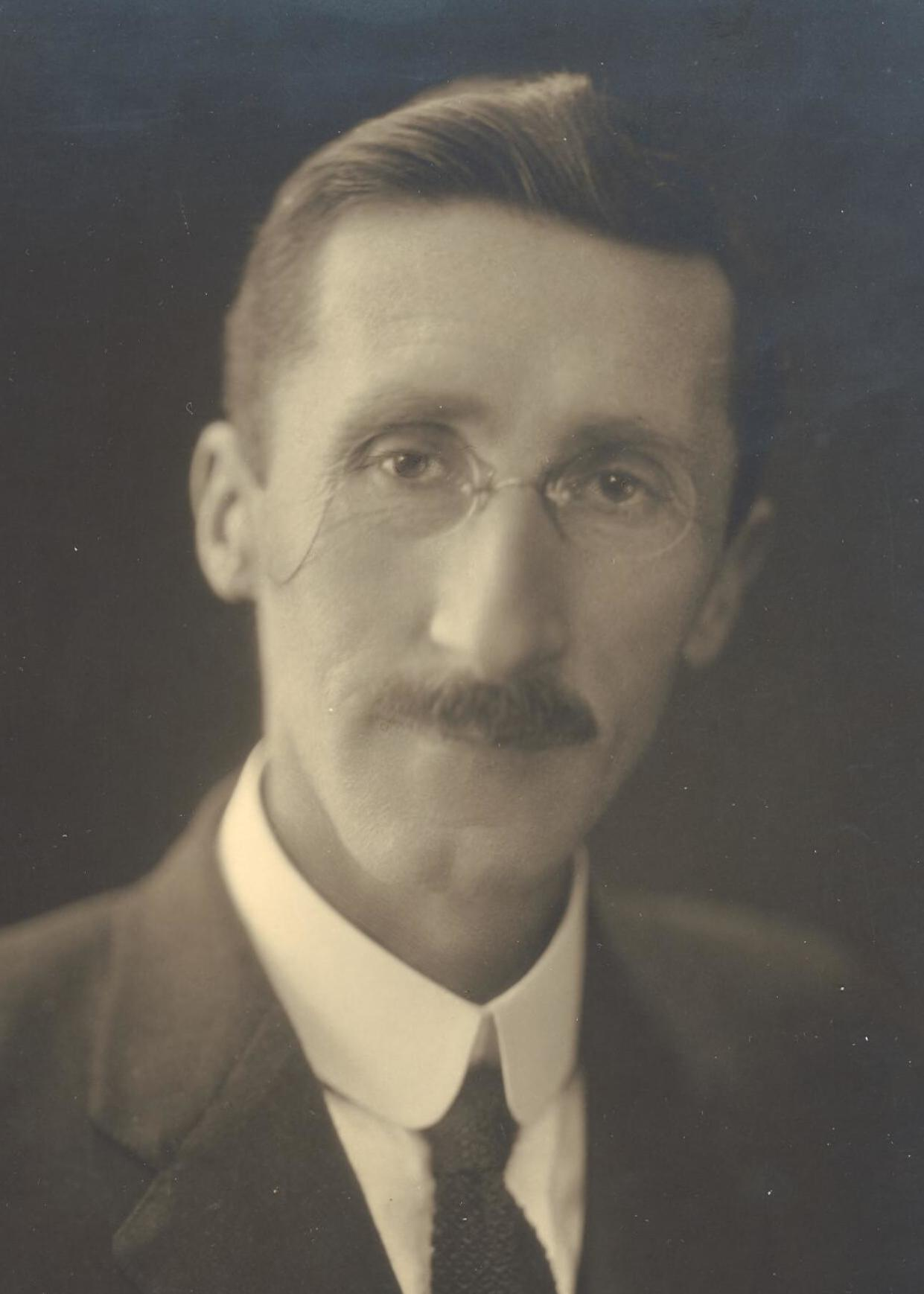

Senator for South Australia
- In office 1 July 1926 – 14 March 1931
- Succeeded by: Harry Kneebone

Member of the South Australian House of Assembly
- In office 6 April 1918 – 4 April 1924
- Preceded by: John Travers
- Succeeded by: John O'Connor
- Constituency: Flinders

Personal details
- Born: John Hedley Chapman; 16 December 1879 Jamestown, South Australia, Australia
- Died: 14 March 1931 (aged 51) Adelaide, South Australia, Australia
- Party: Country Party
- Spouse: Mary Syme (m. 1909)
- Relations: Grant Chapman (great-nephew)
- Occupation: Banker; Farmer

John Hedley Chapman (16 December 1879 – 14 March 1931) was an Australian politician. He was a member of the Country Party and served as a Senator for South Australia from 1926 until his death in 1931. He was involved in the creation of the Farmers and Settlers Association and had earlier been its first representative elected to the South Australian House of Assembly, representing the seat of Flinders from 1918 to 1924.

== Early life ==
Chapman was born on 16 December 1879 in Jamestown, South Australia. He was the son of Sarah Jane (née Williams) and John Chapman. His paternal grandfather was of Cornish origin and had arrived in South Australia in 1845.

Chapman was raised in Jamestown, attending the local state school and later boarding at Prince Alfred College in Adelaide. He joined the National Bank of Australasia in 1895 as a junior clerk in its Jamestown branch. He resigned as assistant manager in 1903 for health reasons and in 1906 took up wheat and sheep farming at Cooyamoolta in the Whites Flat district, where he established a sheep stud. The property was eventually sold in 1921 and in parliament he recalled the difficulties of farming on marginal land during low commodity prices.

== State politics ==
Chapman was an early member of the Farmers and Settlers Association (FSA) and in September 1917 became one of the first candidates officially endorsed by the organisation, which contested elections as the Country Party. He was elected to the South Australian House of Assembly at the 1918 state election, winning the seat of Flinders.

Chapman was re-elected at the 1921 election but lost his seat in 1924. His influence was relatively limited, although he was joined by two other Country Party MPs in 1921. His parliamentary speeches referenced the precarious position of farmers on the Eyre Peninsula, including soldier settlement areas, and covered a wide range of topics including "improved road, rail and telecommunication links, schools, cheaper water, the lack of representation of farmers in the wheat marketing scheme, and monopolies in the supply of such farming necessities as superphosphate".

== Federal politics ==
In the lead-up to the 1925 federal election, the South Australian branches of the Country Party and Nationalist Party agreed to put forward a joint Senate ticket. Chapman was the nominee of the Country Party and was elected to a six-year term commencing on 1 July 1926.

In the Senate, Chapman generally supported the Bruce–Page government's legislation but maintained the independence of the Country Party. He spoke frequently on primary industry and agricultural marketing, visiting Europe at his own expense in 1929 to investigate Australia's export markets. Following the government's defeat by the Australian Labor Party at the 1929 federal election, Chapman supported several pieces of legislation introduced by the Scullin government. He reluctantly supported the Wheat Marketing Bill 1930, which would have introduced compulsory wheat pools, although it was opposed by several of his Country Party colleagues.

== Personal life ==
In 1909, Chapman married Mary Syme, with whom he had six children. He and his family moved to Adelaide in 1921, settling in Unley Park. He was involved with property development at Goodwood and Lower Mitcham.

Chapman "endured a constant struggle with poor health". He died from pneumonia on 14 March 1931, aged 51, at a private hospital in Adelaide. His great-nephew Grant Chapman was elected to the Senate in 1987.

South Australian House of Assembly
Preceded by John Travers	Member for Flinders; 1918–1924; With: James Moseley	Succeeded by John O'Connor
