= The Katoomba Times =

Australian newspaper

The Katoomba Times was established by George W. Spring in early 1889.

== History ==
In early 1889, the year Katoomba became a municipality, Spring established The Katoomba Times which ran under his sole proprietorship until September 1890 when George P. C. Spring (Jun.) and John Albert Southwood took over. Under a revamped banner the paper continued publication until 1894 when Spring and Southwood moved to South Australia. In October 1890 the paper relocated from its original office in Main Street “to more central premises, near The Carrington, and opposite the railway station”. It circulated between Hartley and Springwood.

== Digitisation ==
The Katoomba Times has been digitised as part of the Australian Newspapers Digitisation Program project of the National Library of Australia.

== See also ==
- List of newspapers in New South Wales
- List of newspapers in Australia
