= John Albert Southwood =

Australian politician (1868–1945)

John Albert Southwood (1868 – 18 October 1945) was an Australian politician, newspaperman and trade unionist. He represented the South Australian House of Assembly multi-member seats of Wallaroo from 1912 to 1915 and East Torrens from 1915 to 1921. He was a member of the United Labor Party until 1917, when he joined the National Party after the 1917 Labor split, but sat as an independent from 1920 until his retirement in 1921.

Southwood was born at Wallaroo, and apprenticed as a printer with a local firm. He moved to Broken Hill, where he worked on the composing staff of The Barrier Miner, and became a foundation member of the Barrier Typographical Society. He subsequently moved to Katoomba, where he took over The Katoomba Times in partnership with George Spring. In 1895, Southwood and Spring moved to Kadina and established The Plain Dealer; their partnership would continue until August 1917, after which Spring ran the newspaper alone. Southwood also published a novel, His Other Half, which began as a serial in the Plain Dealer in 1908 and was later released as a book. Prior to entering state politics, he was a District Council of Kadina councillor for several years, including a stint as mayor from 1907 to 1908, and was successful in establishing a municipal electric plant in the face of significant opposition.

He was elected to the House of Assembly at the 1912 state election for Wallaroo, but successfully shifted to East Torrens in 1915 when a redistribution reduced the number of members for the Wallaroo electorate. A supporter of conscription in World War I, he was expelled from the Labor Party in the 1917 Labor split and joined the new National Party, which went into coalition with the conservative Liberal Union. He was re-elected for the National Party at the 1918 election, but resigned from that party to sit as an Independent Labor MHA in 1920 after disagreements with the agenda of the conservative government. He retired at the 1921 election.

Southwood was elected South Australian state secretary of the Australian Theatrical and Amusement Employees' Association in 1915, succeeding Lionel Hill. He served as state secretary for thirty years, retiring in 1945, only two weeks before his death. He had also served two terms as the union's federal president.
