= Charles Henry Hussey =

Australian politician

Charles Henry Hussey (27 September 1832 – 8 January 1899) was a politician in colonial South Australia.

Charles was the youngest son of George Edward Hussey ( –1842) originally of Towcester, Northamptonshire, and his wife Catherine, née Burt (c. 1793–1874), who emigrated on the ship Asia to South Australia, arriving in Holdfast Bay in July 1839.

While in the employ of Matthew Goode as a drapery salesman, Charles was attracted to Port Elliot and settled there, working for Mr. Mackie and Philip Greayer. Early in the 1870s he and his family left Port Elliot to assist with the management of George Fife Angas's "Roslyn House", about 9 miles (14 km) south of Melrose. They returned to Adelaide, and he worked for a few years for John Dunn, then purchased David Golding's milling business in Port Elliot.

He was elected to the South Australian House of Assembly seat of Encounter Bay and sat from March 1887 to April 1890.

He was an uncle of George Hussey MHA.

== Family ==
George Edward Hussey ( – 8 September 1842) of Poole, Dorset, and his wife Catherine, née Burt (c. 1793 – 8 June 1874), and their family arrived in South Australia on the ship Asia in July 1839. Among their descendants were:

- second son Rev. Henry Hussey (27 August 1825 – 6 May 1903) married Mary Ann Reid (died 25 June 1860) on 19 December 1857. Before entering the ministry he was secretary to George Fife Angas.

- Henry Burt Hussey (c. 1860 – 29 March 1882)
He married again, to Agnes Neill (4 February 1829 – 5 August 1920) on 11 November 1861. She arrived on Recovery in 1839. They had three more children:
- son ( – )
- Catherine Jane "Katie" Hussey (18 September 1863 – 12 November 1926) married James Henry Cheetham (c. 1854 – 16 March 1936) on 15 May 1888. They lived at Blackwood. He married again, to Nellie ( – 26 March 1934), lived in Brighton.
- Agnes Mary Hussey (11 September 1866 – 1937) of Porter Street, Parkside.

- George Frederick Hussey (c. 1828 – 26 November 1872) married Emma Maria Tidmarsh (18 March 1829 – 30 March 1922) in 1851. He ran a bakery on King William Street.

- George Frederick Hussey (20 August 1852 – 13 June 1935) married Kate Young Cooke ( – 30 November 1931) on 20 August 1877.
- Julia Frances Hussey (1854– ) married Thomas Templer in 1877; John Bradley Cooke in 1914
- Edward Henry Hussey (1857–1907) married Mrs. Blake of Booyoolie Hotel, Gladstone on 13 February 1882
- William Henry Hussey (1860–1919) married Emily Braund on 17 May 1883
- Frederick "Fred" Hussey (c. 1863 – 19 February 1927) married Mabel Ethel Forsaith ( – 18 February 1939) on 8 August 1892, lived at Aldgate. He was with the South Australian Company for 41 years.

- Jean Hussey ( – )

- Charles Henry Hussey (27 September 1832 – 8 January 1899) married Harriet Ada Webb (c. 1836 – 16 May 1914) on 6 March 1856. Harriet was the second daughter of William Webb of Grenfell Street. Among their children were:

- Henry Allen Hussey (26 February 1859 – 17 September 1909) married Emily Marion Poole (c. 1860 – ), daughter of William Poole, on 26/12/87. He was station master at Riverton.
- William Burt Hussey (29 November 1860 – 6 February 1923) married Alice Reed (c. 1871 – ) daughter of John Reed, on 28 May 1903, lived at Cedar Avenue, Millswood, where his mother spent the last few months of her life. He was employed at the Audit Office.
- Jessie Louisa (5 June 1862 – 16 March 1899) never married. Renowned Botanical Collector
- fourth son George Charles Hussey (20 June 1866 – 31 January 1920) married (Louisa) Emma Champion (c. 1862 – ) on 11 April 1893. He was sanitation inspector of Port Elliot, acted as local tour guide.

- Capt. Herbert Bindley Hussey (11 February 1896 – ) married Una Giles (died in Sydney 15 September 1946). He married again, to Phyllis Jean Giles on 22 May 1948

- Leonard Hussey (3 November 1874 – )
