= Oscar Duhst =

Australian politician

Oscar Hermann Duhst (11 November 1872 – 31 August 1942) was an Australian politician who represented the South Australian House of Assembly multi-member seat of Wooroora from 1912 to 1915 representing the Liberal Union.
