= Harry Buxton =

Australian politician

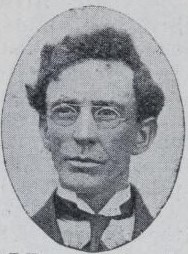

Henry Richard (Harry) Buxton (13 May 1876 – 23 June 1965) was an Australian politician. He was a Labor Party member of the South Australian House of Assembly from 1918 to 1921, representing the electorate of Burra Burra.

Buxton was born at Barossa, the son of H. R. Buxton, a long-time chief guard of the Yatala Labour Prison. He worked as a gardener and at the Islington Railway Workshops before entering politics. He was elected to the House of Assembly at the 1918 election, when along with Labor candidate Mick O'Halloran and Liberal George Jenkins he swept out the three incumbent Farmers and Settlers Association MPs for Burra Burra. It marked the first time Labor had elected two MPs in the electorate. Buxton and O'Halloran were defeated at the 1921 election, succeeded by one Liberal MP and one Country Party MP.

Buxton moved to Victoria after his election defeat, and died in 1965.
