= Samuel Dennison =

Australian politician

Samuel Dennison (12 December 1869 – 27 March 1953) was an Australian politician. He represented the South Australian House of Assembly multi-member seat of Wooroora from 1930 to 1938 for the Country Party and its successor the Liberal and Country League.

Dennison was born at Auburn, South Australia, the son of early colonist Robert Dennison. He went into farming, like his father, and eventually took over his father's property, farming wheat, sheep and wool. He was a District Council of Upper Wakefield councillor from 1911 to 1920 and served a long stint as chairman of the council. Following World War I, he was chairman of the Auburn Repatriation Commission and chairman of the local war memorial committee. Later, he served for many years as chairman of the Northern Agricultural Society, was the first chairman of the Auburn Hospital board and was the Chief Ranger and Trustee of the Court Auburn Forresters' Friendly Society. He was an advocate of the construction of the Spalding railway line and of the retention of the Upper Wakefield council during the 1930s council amalgamations.

Dennison was elected to the House of Assembly at the 1930 election, representing the Country Party. His seat of Wooroora was safe for the conservative parties, but was subject to a contest with the rival Liberal Federation; Dennison managed to win the third of the available three seats. Dennison's inaugural speech, made in June 1930, advocated proportional representation, rejected any electoral system which would change the allocation of seats between city and rural communities, supported a review of the land tax system, supported Crown lands being made available for closer settlement and raised issues about hospital funding structures. He was re-elected at the 1933 election for the Liberal and Country League, the Country Party and Liberal Federation having merged during his first term.

Electoral reform taking effect from the 1938 election saw the abolition of multi-member electorates in the House of Assembly and a return to the single-member system. By January 1937, Dennison had decided to contest the new Stanley electorate, which was also sought by LCL party president and fellow MHA Alexander Melrose. However, by June that year, media reports stated that he had "no chance" of winning preselection and would instead run as an independent. He recontested in Stanley as an independent and lost his seat to Melrose.

In 1950, Dennison left the Auburn district and moved to Prospect in Adelaide. He died at Prospect in 1953, aged 83, and was buried in the Auburn Cemetery.
