= Electoral district of East Torrens =

Former state electoral district of South Australia

Coordinates: 34°55′26″S 138°38′42″E

East Torrens South Australia—House of Assembly
- State: South Australia
- Dates current: 1857–1902, 1915–1938
- Namesake: River Torrens
- Demographic: Metropolitan

East Torrens was an electoral district of the House of Assembly in the Australian state of South Australia from 1857 to 1902 and again from 1915 to 1938.

East Torrens was also the name of an electoral district of the unicameral South Australian Legislative Council from 1851 until its abolition in 1857, George Waterhouse (July 1851 to June 1854), Charles Fenn (June 1854 to August 1855) and John Bristow Hughes (September 1855 to February 1857) being the members.

== Members ==
First incarnation (1857–1902)
Member	Party	Term	Member	Party	Term
George Waterhouse		1857–1857	Charles Bonney		1857–1858
Lavington Glyde		1857–1860	Charles Bonney		1857–1858
Lavington Glyde		1857–1860	John Barrow		1858–1860
Henry Mildred, Sr.		1860–1865	Neville Blyth		1860–1867
Charles Goode		1865–1866	Neville Blyth		1860–1867
Randolph Stow		1866–1868	Neville Blyth		1860–1867
Randolph Stow		1866–1868	Daniel Fisher		1867–1870
George Pearce		1868–1870	Daniel Fisher		1867–1870
Henry Mildred, Jr.		1870–1871	Alexander Hay		1870–1871
Edwin Smith		1871–1877	George Stevenson		1871–1875
Edwin Smith		1871–1877	Thomas Playford		1875–1887
David Murray		1877–1878	Thomas Playford		1875–1887
Edwin Smith		1878–1893	Thomas Playford		1875–1887
Edwin Smith		1878–1893	Saul Solomon		1887–1890
Edwin Smith		1878–1893	Thomas Playford		1890–1894
Frederick Coneybeer	Labor	1893–1902	Thomas Playford		1890–1894
Frederick Coneybeer	Labor	1893–1902	David Packham	Defence League	1894–1896
Frederick Coneybeer	Labor	1893–1902	John Darling, Jr.	National League	1896–1902

Second incarnation (1915–1938)
Member	Party	Term	Member	Party	Term	Member	Party	Term
Frederick Coneybeer	Labor	1915–1917	John Southwood	Labor	1915–1917	Lionel Hill	Labor	1915–1917
Frederick Coneybeer	National	1917–1921	John Southwood	National	1917–1920	Walter Hamilton	Liberal Union	1917–1924
Frederick Coneybeer	National	1917–1921	John Southwood	Independent Labor	1920–1921	Walter Hamilton	Liberal Union	1917–1924
Joseph Harper	Liberal Union	1921–1924	Leslie Hunkin	Labor	1921–1927	Walter Hamilton	Liberal Union	1917–1924
Harry Kneebone	Labor	1924–1925	Leslie Hunkin	Labor	1921–1927	Frederick Coneybeer	Liberal Federation	1924–1930
Walter Hamilton	Liberal Federation	1925–1930	Leslie Hunkin	Labor	1921–1927	Frederick Coneybeer	Liberal Federation	1924–1930
Walter Hamilton	Liberal Federation	1925–1930	Albert Sutton	Liberal Federation	1927–1930	Frederick Coneybeer	Liberal Federation	1924–1930
Beasley Kearney	Labor	1930–1933	Arthur McArthur	Labor	1930–1931	Frank Nieass	Labor	1930–1933
Beasley Kearney	Labor	1930–1933	Arthur McArthur	Parliamentary Labor	1931–1933	Frank Nieass	Labor	1930–1933
Charles Abbott	Liberal and Country	1933–1938	Walter Hamilton	Liberal and Country	1933–1938	Frank Perry	Liberal and Country	1933–1938
