= Samuel Dickson (Australian politician) =

Australian politician

Samuel William Dickson (6 October 1866 – 29 November 1955) was an Australian politician who represented the South Australian House of Assembly multi-member seat of Burra Burra from 1921 to 1924 for the Liberal Union and Liberal Federation.

He had previously served as mayor of the Corporate Town of Peterborough from 1906 to 1908, and was a Peterborough councillor for eighteen years.

Civic offices
Preceded by W. A. Casley	Mayor of Peterborough; 1906–1908	Succeeded by W. Butterworth
Parliament of South Australia
Preceded by Harry Buxton; Mick O'Halloran	Member for Burra Burra; 1921-1924	Succeeded by Albert Hawke; Sydney McHugh; Mick O'Halloran
