= Bert Edwards (politician) =

Australian publican and politician

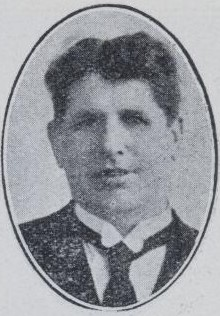
- Born: 6 November 1888
- Died: 24 August 1963 (aged 74)
- Occupation: Australian politician

Albert Augustine Edwards (6 November 1888 – 24 August 1963) was an Australian publican and politician.

== Early life and education ==
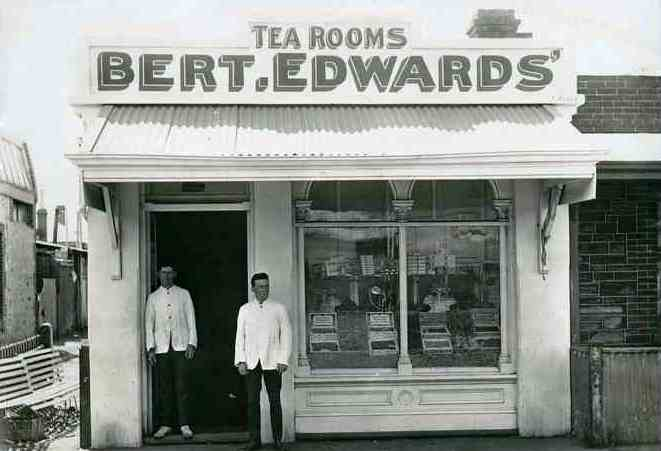
Tea rooms Compton Street, Adelaide 1912

Edwards was born in Adelaide on 6 November 1888. His father was "widely believed" to be Charles Kingston, a member of parliament and future premier.

He attended St Joseph's School in Russell Street, in the south-western corner of Adelaide city centre.

== Businessman ==
Before entering politics he held various jobs as a stall keeper, marine store dealer and hotel keeper, eventually holding licences for the Brunswick Hotel, the Newmarket Hotel on North Terrace and the Hotel Victor at Victor Harbor. He took over the British Lion Hotel in Hindmarsh.

== Politics ==
In 1917 he was elected to the South Australian House of Assembly as the Labor member for Adelaide. He was also a prominent elected member of the Adelaide City Council. In both State and Municipal politics he had a frequent antagonist in Mrs. A. K. Goode. Goode and Edwards were candidates for the seat of Adelaide in the House of Assembly elections in 1924. Edwards and fellow Labor Party candidates Bill Denny and John Gunn were successful; Goode came a distant fourth. Goode and Edwards were candidates for the Grey ward for the Adelaide City Council in 1924. Edwards topped the poll but had, as Mrs. Goode pointed out, contravened the Act by driving voters to the polling place. She refrained from formally charging him, as this could have given her the seat by default without a fair majority of votes.

Both had interests in prison reform, and both served on the State Children's Council, but frequently and publicly disagreed on aims and objects. In 1925 Goode criticised as excessively lenient the jailing for one year of one Kelly, who was convicted of indecent assault. Edwards defended the judge, pointing out that the girl was a consenting party and above the age of consent. In 1927 Edwards criticised her for disallowing a proposed increase in allowances for "State girls" (wards of the State who were "boarded out" with generally well-to-do families or widows as companions and maids-of-all-work) from 2/ to 5/ (shillings) per week.

Edwards served as a Member of the House of Assembly until 1931, when his seat was vacated by absence without leave. He had been convicted of "an unnatural offence" with John Gaunt "Jack" Mundy, 16, a "sexually perverted boy", and sentenced to five years' jail. His appeals failed but he was released in 1933.

For his period of incarceration, he had his brother Arthur and sister-in-law Millicent Edwards manage his hotel, the Castle Inn at the corner of Hindley and Morphett Streets. In 1937 Millicent brought an action against Albert, charging him with assault and indecent language which he had used against her when she demanded money in consideration of the work she had put into his hotel. Her suit was unsuccessful and she was ordered to pay costs.

In 1940 he stood unsuccessfully as an Independent for the Federal seat of Adelaide. In 1948 he won a seat on the Adelaide City Council for the Grey ward.

A charge of gross indecency brought against Edwards in 1942 was dropped when the two principal witnesses refused to testify.

== Philanthropy ==
In 1961 he endowed a men's refuge in Whitmore Square; in 1963 he purchased the adjoining property as a rehabilitation centre for prisoners, named the Frank Lundie Hostel for his friend and colleague the secretary of the South Australian branch of the Australian Workers' Union. He contributed generously to a meal centre run by the Daughters of Charity in Hutt Street.

== Football ==
"Bert" Edwards was a longtime follower of the West Adelaide Football Club, a member of the South Australian Football League. In 1921 West Adelaide nominated him as their delegate to the League's governing body, but was rejected on the grounds that he had once used intemperate language at a junior meeting. Edwards, who had no knowledge of the offence, refused to apologise, and a standoff ensued, which became so entrenched that at one stage consideration was given to disbanding the League and re-forming it without West Adelaide.

== Western Australia ==
Edwards was a frequent, prominent and newsworthy visitor to Western Australia and in 1925 was appointed a Justice of the Peace for that State. When he successfully stood for the Grey ward in the Adelaide City Council, his election was touted by the Perth Sunday Times as attracting the "most interest".

== Death ==
He died in 1963, without any heirs. His considerable assets were left to charities for the homeless and destitute.
