= Stanley Whitford =

Australian politician

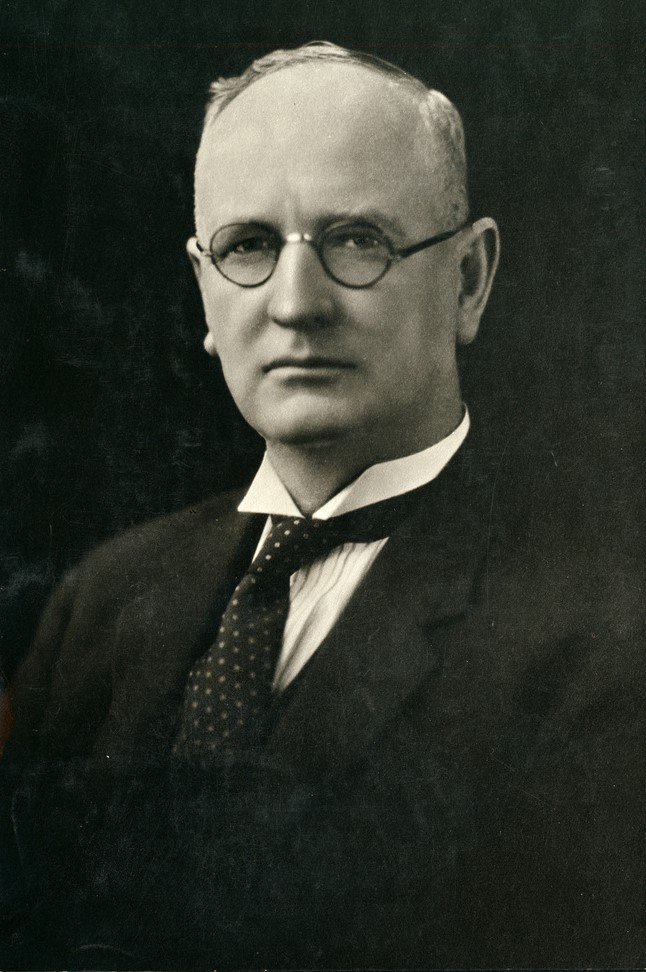

Stanley R. Whitford (5 January 1878 (Note: Parliamentary records list his date of birth as 5 January 1878. The Australian Dictionary of Biography gives his date of birth as 5 June 1878. It is not known for what, if anything, the "R" stood.) – 13 December 1959) was a unionist and Labor politician in the State of South Australia.

== History ==
Stanley Whitford was born the youngest son of Richard Whitford (ca.1835 – 27 April 1898) and Emma Prior Whitford (the widow Prior), née Matthews, (1835 – 28 July 1908) of Moonta. His parents emigrated from Gunnislake, Cornwall on the Sir Richard Burlington, arriving in Adelaide on 14 February 1856. They spent three years in Burra before settling in Moonta.

Stanley R. Whitford, as he became known, was educated at the State school and attended night classes at the Moonta School of Mines in 1897 and 1898. He was employed by a blacksmith for seven years, then from 1899 to 1908 worked on the goldfields in Western Australia. then started working for the South Australian Railways at Mount Gambier and became active with the South Australian Railways and Tramways Association. He moved to Adelaide sometime before 1918, living at Gilles Street.

== Politics ==
He was an (unsuccessful) candidate for membership of the Mount Gambier Council in 1915 and 1916. He stood unsuccessfully as Labor candidate for the Young ward of the Adelaide City Council in 1918. but succeeded at the following poll and served 1922–1924, when he was narrowly defeated – by this time he was living in Osmond Street, Adelaide.

He succeeded as the Labor candidate for North Adelaide in the South Australian House of Assembly in 1921 and again in 1924 but was beaten in 1927. In 1929 he was elected to the South Australian Legislative Council to fill a vacancy left by the death of John Carr. He was endorsed by the Labor Party at the last moment, as a replacement for Douglas H. Bardolph, who had displeased the party's power brokers. He retained the seat until 1941.

He succeeded J. Jelley as Chief Secretary (leader of the government party in the Legislative Council) in 1930, and retained it until the demise of the Hill government in 1933. From 1930 to 1933 he was Minister for Immigration, Irrigation, Repatriation and Agriculture.

He made headlines in 1931 when he admitted that he, like most politicians, achieved power with promises that could not, or should not, be delivered.

He was expelled from the ALP in 1931 for supporting the Premiers' Plan, then re-admitted in 1945.

== Family ==
Whitford married Edith Thyra Dixon (ca.1878 – 20 March 1950), also of Moonta, on 1 October 1910. They had two sons: Gene Whitford and Owen Whitford.

He had a sister Mary Lavinia "Polly" Whitford (ca.1856 – 18 April 1900), who married (mining) Captain Richard Cowling (ca.1854 – 27 September 1921) in 1877. Other siblings were Richard Prior (ca. March 1854 – 10 September 1927), of Yelta, Mrs. C. J. Holmes, of Norwood and Whyalla; and Alma (ca.1870 – 17 September 1913), who married Benjamin Jolly, of Moonta Mines

== Other interests ==
He was a fair musician, well known as a public speaker and popular for his humorous recitations.

access-dateHe was fond of drinking in company, and was once fined £5 for frequenting a hotel bar after hours. He once (unsuccessfully) sued a prohibitionist parson who criticized him as being manipulated by the alcohol industry. He was at the time a representative for a Scotch whisky company.

He was a keen follower of the sport or pastime of coursing. He was an owner of "My Mate", winner of the (Australian) Waterloo Cup.

== Artwork ==
He was several times caricatured by Copper Triangle artist Oswald Pryor.
