= John Gunn (Australian politician) =

Australian politician (1884–1959)

The Honourable John Gunn
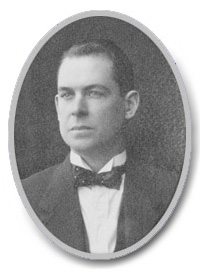
- Gunn, c. 1920s

29th Premier of South Australia
- In office 16 April 1924 – 28 August 1926
- Monarch: George V
- Governor: Sir Tom Bridges
- Preceded by: Henry Barwell
- Succeeded by: Lionel Hill

Leader of the Opposition in South Australia
- In office 18 April 1918 – 16 April 1924
- Preceded by: Andrew Kirkpatrick
- Succeeded by: Henry Barwell

Leader of the South Australian Labor Party
- In office 18 April 1918 – 18 August 1926
- Preceded by: Andrew Kirkpatrick
- Succeeded by: Lionel Hill

Personal details
- Born: 16 December 1884 Bendigo, Colony of Victoria
- Died: 27 June 1959 (aged 74) Waterfall, New South Wales, Australia
- Party: Australian Labor Party (SA)

John Gunn (16 December 1884 – 27 June 1959) was an Australian politician who served as the 29th Premier of South Australia, leading the South Australian Branch of the Australian Labor Party to government at the 1924 election.

== Early life ==
Gunn was born on 16 December 1884 in Bendigo, Victoria. He was the second of nine children born to Mary Ann (née Wayman) and William Gunn. His father was born in Scotland and worked as a miner.

Gunn's father died when he was young, forcing him to work as a butcher's delivery boy to support his mother and siblings while studying at night classes. He moved to Melbourne in 1901 and worked as a tea-packer and trolley-driver, also briefly working in the Western Australian timber mills. After returning to Melbourne he married Haidee Smith on 8 September 1908. They then moved to Adelaide where Gunn found work as a horse-lorry driver on the Port Road. He soon became the President of the South Australian branch of the Federated Carters and Driver's Union and organised the 1910 Drivers' Strike, which secured reduced working hours, although he made enemies in the wealthy and influential Adelaide Establishment, who considered him a dangerous communist.

== Politics ==
Gunn's success with the Carters and Driver's Union led to his election as President of the United Trades and Labour Council of South Australia in 1911 and, as his star continued to rise, he was elected to Adelaide City Council in 1914, serving to 1916, when he became Federal President of the Federated Carters and Driver's Union.

"Greatly respected for his tactful courtesy and self-control", Gunn entered the South Australian House of Assembly at the 1915 election as a Labor member for the Electoral district of Adelaide. He soon emerged as a leading anti-conscriptionist in the bitter internal Labor fight over conscription which led to a split in the party. Resigning his seat, Gunn stood unsuccessfully for the federal House of Representatives Division of Boothby as an anti-conscriptionist candidate at the 1917 federal election but returned to state parliament by regaining his Adelaide seat at the 1918 state election.

While many Labor party members were opposed to conscription, party leadership, including premier Crawford Vaughan, were in favour and either resigned or were expelled from the party, leaving Labor with a rump of inexperienced members of parliament following their 1918 election loss. Gunn, aged 32, was elected leader of the Labor Party and Leader of the Opposition, a move that concerned the Establishment, who recalled the 1910 Driver's Strike and thought he should not be allowed near the reins of power. A media campaign against Gunn began in earnest.

The Labor Party lost the 1921 election but was able to regain a number of Adelaide-based seats they had lost in 1918 and, under Gunn's leadership, defeated Henry Barwell's Liberal Federation at the 1924 election following a split between the Liberal Federation and its erstwhile ally, the Country Party. Gunn became Premier and Treasurer of South Australia as well as Minister for Irrigation and Minister for Repatriation at age 39.

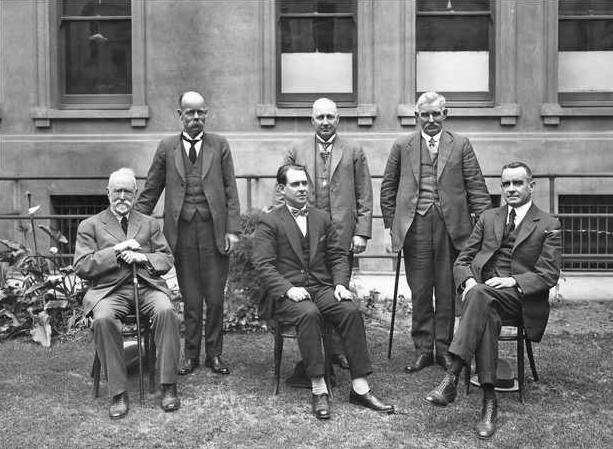
The Gunn Ministry. Gunn is seated centre.

As Premier, Gunn established the State Bank of South Australia and developed Colonel Light Gardens, one of Australia's first planned suburbs. He also improved public service working conditions, built more roads and encouraged rural settlement. A "Thousand Homes Scheme" was carried out to improve the quality and supply of housing for needy families, spending on education was increased, provided better medical facilities and new junior technical schools, higher wages for teachers, and more scholarships. Working conditions were also improved, while measures were undertaken to improve conditions in rural areas "with a visionary afforestation programme in addition to better roads and improvements in access to bore water and technical expertise in agriculture." His reforms impressed many and even received grudging praise from the previously hostile media, who realised he had mellowed into a more moderate figure than the strike leader 15 years previously.

Gunn still raised the ire of conservatives through his plans to redraw the Assembly electorate boundaries, introduce a proportional representation electoral system, introduce adult franchise to the Legislative Council and establish a state government insurance commission, all of which were defeated by the conservative controlled Legislative Council.

Having gained a reputation as a competent administrator and Premier, Gunn surprised many when he suddenly resigned from the Premiership and parliament on 9 August 1926 to accept a Melbourne-based position with the Commonwealth Development and Migration Commission on a greatly improved salary. Lionel Hill took over the Labor leadership and Premiership. When the position ended, he accepted a federal government appointment in 1930 and moved to Canberra. When Australian Prime Minister Joseph Lyons declined to renew Gunn's contract in 1935, Gunn, estranged from his wife and family and possibly in debt, suffered a nervous breakdown. Little was known of his subsequent life.

== Death ==
Gunn died in poverty in Waterfall, New South Wales. So far was his fall into obscurity that the South Australian media was not aware of their former Premier's death for some weeks.

Political offices
Preceded by Andrew Kirkpatrick	Leader of the Opposition of South Australia; 1918 – 1924	Succeeded by Henry Barwell
Preceded by Henry Barwell	Premier of South Australia; 1924 – 1926	Succeeded by Lionel Hill
Preceded by William Hague	Treasurer of South Australia; 1924 – 1926	Succeeded by Lionel Hill
Parliament of South Australia
Preceded by Edward Anstey	Member for Adelaide; 1915–1917; Served alongside: Reginald Blundell, Bill Denny	Succeeded by Bert Edwards
Preceded by Reginald Blundell	Member for Adelaide; 1918–1926; Served alongside: Bert Edwards, Bill Denny	Succeeded by Herbert George
Party political offices
Preceded by Andrew Kirkpatrick	Leader of the Australian Labor Party (South Australian Branch); 1918 – 1926	Succeeded by Lionel Hill
