= Henry Barwell =

Australian politician (1877–1959)

The Honourable Sir Henry Barwell KCMG
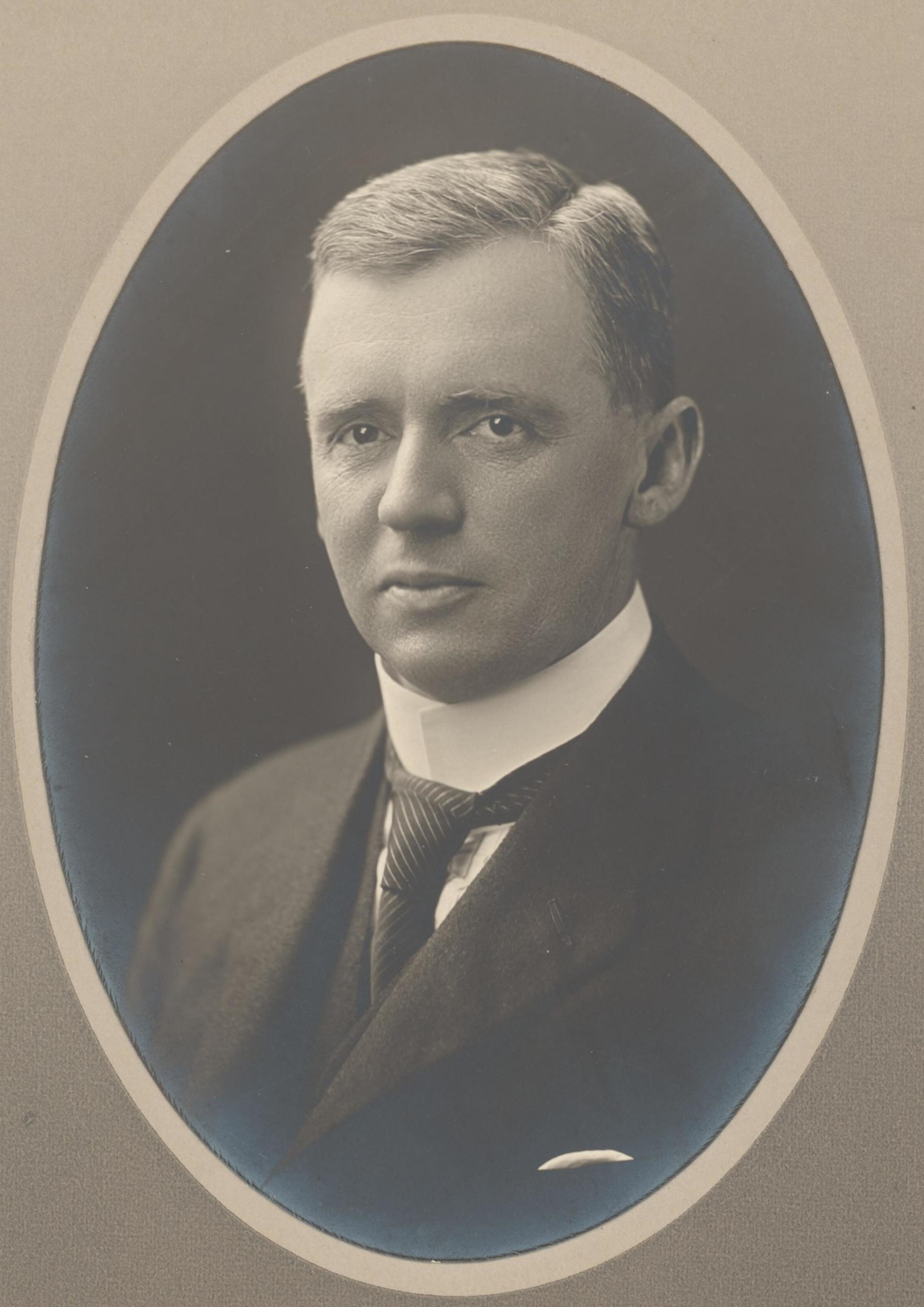

28th Premier of South Australia
- In office 8 April 1920 – 16 April 1924
- Monarch: George V
- Governor: Sir Henry Galway; Sir Archibald Weigall; Sir Tom Bridges
- Preceded by: Archibald Peake
- Succeeded by: John Gunn

Leader of the Opposition in South Australia
- In office 16 April 1924 – 17 December 1925
- Preceded by: John Gunn
- Succeeded by: Richard L. Butler

Senator for South Australia
- In office 18 December 1925 – 22 March 1928
- Preceded by: James O'Loghlin
- Succeeded by: Albert Robinson

14th Agent-General for South Australia
- In office 22 April 1928 – 22 April 1933
- Preceded by: John Price
- Succeeded by: Lionel Hill

Personal details
- Born: 26 February 1877 Adelaide, South Australia
- Died: 30 September 1959 (aged 82) Unley Park, South Australia
- Party: Liberal Union, Liberal Federation (state); Nationalist (federal)

Sir Henry Newman Barwell KCMG (26 February 1877 – 30 September 1959) was the 28th premier of South Australia.

== Early life ==
Born in Adelaide, South Australia, Barwell was educated at St Peter's College and the University of Adelaide, graduating in law. Admitted to the bar in 1899, Barwell built a successful legal practice where he specialised in defending murder suspects and became a prominent figure in the Adelaide Establishment. In 1902, he married Anne Webb in Clare, South Australia and together they had one son and three daughters.

== Political career ==
Barwell entered the South Australian House of Assembly in 1915 as the Liberal Union member for the seat of Stanley. In parliament he quickly became known both as an uncompromising conservative and as a likely future premier. He defended the restricted franchise of the South Australian Legislative Council, arguing that the Labor Party should not be allowed to gain control "over the capital that employs labor, and over the superior intellect that governs that labor".

In 1917, Barwell was made Attorney-General of South Australia and Minister for Industry in Archibald Peake's cabinet and was forced to deal with the deteriorating relationship between the urban and rural constituencies of the Liberal Union, which worsened with the creation of the Country Party in 1919, taking many of the Liberal Union's supporters with it. Peake died soon after and Barwell became Premier of South Australia on 8 April 1920. Despite voter antipathy against Barwell over his abrasive and sometimes tactless political style, the Liberal Union was nonetheless returned to office at the 1921 election, with Barwell retaining the Premiership.

Never one to shy away from controversy, Barwell publicly advocated the importation of coloured labour into tropical Australia, contrary to the White Australia Policy which at the time had almost unanimous support. Barwell argued that northern Australia had proven unsuitable for white settlement and only the large scale importation of "selected Asiatics working as coolie labour under indenture to white men" would help develop the region as they were the only race suited to such conditions. This was heresy for many Australians, particularly those in the opposition Labor Party, for which the White Australia Policy was historically a central plank in their policy platform. Labor politicians treated Barwell with undisguised contempt for the rest of his career, referring to him as "Black Barwell".

Barwell's decisiveness was evident during his premiership when he addressed the state of the South Australian Railways, which by 1922 had decayed to the point of imminent total collapse, endangering state finances. He forced the funding of a £5 million rehabilitation program through parliament and recruited a brilliant American railroad executive, William Alfred Webb, to lead it. He strongly supported Webb in applying business operating principles to the railways' operations. However, although the South Australian Railways was better prepared than most to meet the huge logistical demands of World War 2, the huge investment did not make the railways profitable – mainly because of the impacts of the Great Depression and the growth in ownership of motor cars. One long-remembered legacy of his premiership, however, was the nicknaming of a fleet of railcars, delivered during his reforms, as "Barwell's Bulls".

In 1922 Barwell announced the "South Australian Farm Apprenticeship Scheme", which undertook the ambitious target of arranging the immigration of 6000 young men and boys from England to cover the 6000 South Australian World War I casualties. He travelled to England to personally oversee the recruitment of what became known as the "Barwell Boys". Widespread unemployment in England led 14,000 boys, mainly aged between 15 and 17, to apply for the scheme. While the eventual number of Barwell Boys numbered only 1700, the scheme was considered a great success, with many of the émigrés playing significant roles in the development of South Australia.

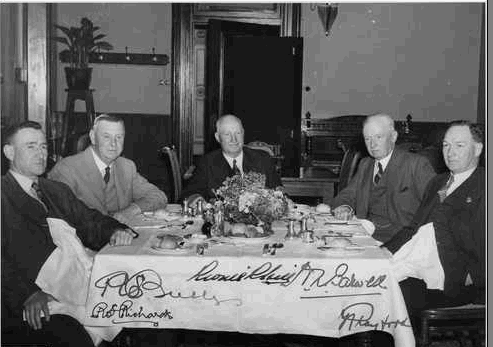
Former South Australian premiers (from left) Robert Richards, Sir Richard Butler, Lionel Hill and Sir Henry Barwell meet with then Premier Tom Playford in 1940

While in London, Barwell was made a Knight Commander of the Order of St Michael and St George (KCMG) in the Birthday Honours List of 1922. He returned to South Australia to find that he and his government were becoming increasingly unpopular due to his policies of small government and wage restraint, as well as lingering resentment over his earlier comments on importing coloured labour.

Barwell lost the 1924 election to the John Gunn led Labor Party and, after briefly acting as Opposition Leader, resigned from state parliament, seeking a seat in the Australian House of Representatives with a view to becoming Prime Minister. No seats were immediately forthcoming and instead he was forced to settle for appointment to the Senate, filling a vacancy caused by the death of Senator James O'Loghlin in 1925.

Sitting with the Nationalist Party of Australia, Barwell served in the Senate until 1928, often clashing with his party colleagues due to his outspokenness and independent mind. Realising that a move into the lower house was now a forlorn hope, Barwell resigned from the Senate to accept the posting of South Australian Agent-General in London. He served in that position until 1933, helping to prepare opinion for the Ottawa Agreement and for the closer collaboration of the various parts of the British Empire. Described by The Times as a "strong Imperialist with a practical outlook", Barwell was a firm believer in reciprocal trade between members of the Empire.

After the completion of his term as Agent General, Barwell remained in London, entering into various business interests, before eventually returning to Adelaide in 1940, where he unsuccessfully stood for pre-selection in his old seat of Stanley. Growing increasingly deaf, Barwell served as Deputy Chairman of the South Australian Housing Trust for fifteen years until his death in 1959 from cerebrovascular disease.

== Sport ==
Sir Henry was an expert lawn bowler and represented Australia at the 1934 British Empire Games.

Political offices
Preceded by John Vaughan	Attorney-General of South Australia; 1917	Succeeded by Archibald Peake
Preceded by Archibald Peake	Attorney-General of South Australia; 1918-1924	Succeeded by Bill Denny
Preceded by Archibald Peake	Premier of South Australia; 1920–1924	Succeeded by John Gunn
Preceded by John Gunn	Leader of the Opposition of South Australia; 1924–1925	Succeeded by Richard Layton Butler
Parliament of South Australia
Preceded by Harry Jackson	Member for Stanley; 1915–1925; Served alongside: Robert Nicholls	John Lyons
Party political offices
Preceded by Archibald Peake	Leader of the Liberal Union (SA); 1920–1923	Party disbanded
New political party	Leader of the Liberal Federation (SA); 1923–1925	Succeeded by Richard Layton Butler
Diplomatic posts
Preceded by John Price	Agent-General for South Australia; 1928–1933	Succeeded by Lionel Hill
