= Electoral district of Burra Burra =

Former South Australian state electoral district

Coordinates: 32°58′S 138°50′E

Burra Burra South Australia—House of Assembly
- State: South Australia
- Created: 1902
- Abolished: 1938
- Namesake: Burra, South Australia
- Demographic: Rural

Burra Burra was an electoral district of the House of Assembly in the Australian state of South Australia from 1902 to 1938.

After a boundary redistribution in 1902, the Electoral district of Burra was abolished and the new district of Burra Burra was created.

The town of Burra is currently located in the seat of Stuart.

== Members ==
Member	Party	Term	Member	Party	Term	Member	Party	Term
Laurence O'Loughlin		1902–1904	William Miller		1902–1904	Ben Rounsevell		1902–1906
Laurence O'Loughlin	Farmers and Producers	1904–1910	William Miller	Farmers and Producers	1904–1910	Ben Rounsevell		1902–1906
Laurence O'Loughlin	Farmers and Producers	1904–1910	William Miller	Farmers and Producers	1904–1910	John Newland	Labor	1906–1912
Laurence O'Loughlin	Liberal Union	1910–1918	William Miller	Liberal Union	1910–1918	John Newland	Labor	1906–1912
Laurence O'Loughlin	Liberal Union	1910–1918	William Miller	Liberal Union	1910–1918	Robert Homburg Jr.	Liberal Union	1912–1915
Laurence O'Loughlin	Liberal Union	1910–1918	William Miller	Liberal Union	1910–1918	John Pick	Liberal Union	1915–1918
Laurence O'Loughlin	Farmers and Settlers	1918–1918	William Miller	Farmers and Settlers	1918–1918	John Pick	Farmers and Settlers	1918–1918
George Jenkins	Liberal Union	1918–1923	Harry Buxton	Labor	1918–1921	Mick O'Halloran	Labor	1918–1921
George Jenkins	Liberal Union	1918–1923	Thomas Hawke	Country	1921–1924	Samuel Dickson	Liberal Union	1921–1923
George Jenkins	Liberal Federation	1923–1924	Thomas Hawke	Country	1921–1924	Samuel Dickson	Liberal Federation	1923–1924
Bert Hawke	Labor	1924–1927	Sydney McHugh	Labor	1924–1927	Mick O'Halloran	Labor	1924–1927
George Jenkins	Liberal Federation	1927–1930	Reginald Carter	Country	1927–1928	Francis Jettner	Liberal Federation	1927–1930
George Jenkins	Liberal Federation	1927–1930	Reginald Carter	Liberal Federation	1928–1930	Francis Jettner	Liberal Federation	1927–1930
Even George	Labor	1930–1931	Sydney McHugh	Labor	1930–1931	Jack Critchley	Labor	1930–1931
Even George	Parliamentary Labor	1931–1933	Sydney McHugh	Parliamentary Labor	1931–1933	Jack Critchley	Parliamentary Labor	1931–1933
George Jenkins	Liberal and Country	1933–1938	Archibald McDonald	Liberal and Country	1933–1938	Alexander Melrose	Liberal and Country	1933–1938
