= George Hussey =

Australian politician

George Frederick Hussey (20 August 1852 – 13 June 1935) was a politician in the State of South Australia.

== History ==
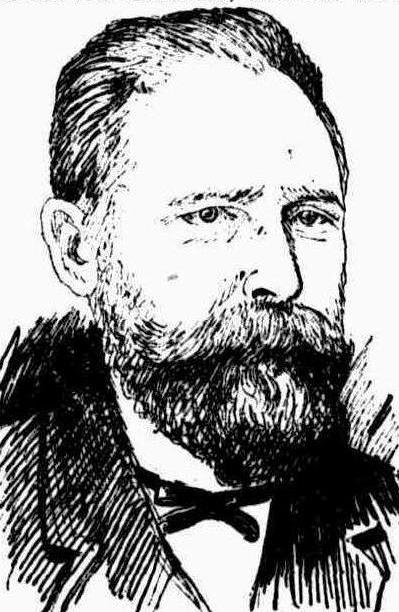
George Frederick Hussey

George Hussey's father, also named George Frederick Hussey, arrived in South Australia on the ship Asia in July 1839 with his parents George Edward Hussey and Catherine, née Burt, and three other children. He was educated at a private school run by James Bath, who was later secretary to the Minister of Education.

In 1890 he and J. W. Gillingham took over the printing establishment of T. S. Carey & Co., at 106–108 Currie Street, which they ran as Hussey and Gillingham, becoming Gillingham & Co. when Hussey retired in 1922. They were responsible for printing The Southern Cross from 1890. He was for some time President of the Master Printers Association. He married Kate Young Cooke ( – 30 November 1931) on 20 August 1877. Joseph Williams Gillingham (c. 1859 – 6 December 1943), his partner, was the second son of Rev. J. Gillingham, of Strathablyn.

He was a founder of South Australian Literary Societies' Union, serving as Secretary and President at various times, and as Speaker of its Union Parliament.

He represented the South Australian House of Assembly multi-member seat of Sturt from April 1921 to April 1924 for the Liberal Union and the Liberal Federation.

He died near the City Bridge, King William Road, after stepping in front of a tramcar moving at 32 to 40 kilometres per hour (20 to 25 mph).

Charles Henry Hussey, member of the House of Assembly, and pastor Henry Hussey were his uncles.
