= Electoral district of Wooroora =

Former South Australian state electoral district

Coordinates: 34°01′38″S 138°41′08″E

Wooroora South Australia—House of Assembly
- State: South Australia
- Created: 1875
- Abolished: 1938
- Demographic: Rural

Wooroora was an electoral district of the House of Assembly in the Australian colony (state from 1901) of South Australia.

The electorate was created by the Electoral Districts Act 1872 of the South Australian parliament but it was not until the provincial election of 1875 that candidates were first elected to represent Woorooroo. The electorate stretched from Gulf St Vincent in the west to Riverton in the east, spanning the central and northern Adelaide Plains from the River Light in the south to Hoyleton and Auburn north of the Wakefield River, in the north.

The structure of the parliament was changed and its membership reduced by the Constitution Act Amendment Act, 1901. The new Wooroora district elected three members and comprised the former Wooroora and Light districts.

According to South Australian historian Geoff Manning, the name derives from an Aboriginal name for the area, the (central) Adelaide Plains, about 90 kilometres (56 mi) north of Adelaide (roughly where the Wakefield River crosses the plain).

The chief polling place was listed as Riverton, with subsidiary polling places at Humphrey's Springs (now Alma), Stockport, Port Wakefield, Balaklava, Auburn, Rhynie, Watervale, Tarlee, and Hoyleton. The electorate boundaries were defined as lands including the whole of the Hundreds of Goyder, Stow, Hall, Inkerman, Balaklava, Dalkey, and Alma as well as parts of the Hundreds of Dublin, Grace, Light, Gilbert, Upper Wakefield and Stanley. The number of members was set at two.

== Members ==
Two members (1875–1902)
Member	Party	Term	Member	Party	Term
H. E. Bright		1875–1884	James Pearce		1875–1875
H. E. Bright		1875–1884	John Bosworth		1875–1884
John Duncan		1884–1890	J. W. Castine		1884–1891
H. C. Kelly		1890–1891	J. W. Castine		1884–1891
Robert Kelly		1891–1893	J. W. Castine	Defence League	1891–1896
James McLachlan, Sr.	Defence League	1893–1896	J. W. Castine	Defence League	1891–1896
James McLachlan, Sr.		1896–1902	J. W. Castine	National League	1896–1902

Three members (1902–1938)
Member	Party	Term	Member	Party	Term	Member	Party	Term
Jenkin Coles	National League	1902–1910	David James	National League	1902–1910	F. W. Paech	National League	1902–1908
Jenkin Coles	National League	1902–1910	David James	National League	1902–1910	Frederick Young	Farmers and Producers	1909–1910
Jenkin Coles	Liberal Union	1910–1911	David James	Liberal Union	1910–1918	Frederick Young	Liberal Union	1910–1915
Oscar Duhst	Liberal Union	1912–1915	David James	Liberal Union	1910–1918	Frederick Young	Liberal Union	1910–1915
Richard Layton Butler	Liberal Union	1915–1918	David James	Liberal Union	1910–1918	Albert Robinson	Liberal Union	1915–1924
James McLachlan Jr.	Liberal Union	1918–1923	Allan Robertson	Labor	1918–1921	Albert Robinson	Liberal Union	1915–1924
James McLachlan Jr.	Liberal Union	1918–1923	Richard Layton Butler	Liberal Union	1921–1923	Albert Robinson	Liberal Union	1915–1924
James McLachlan Jr.	Liberal Federation	1923–1930	Richard Layton Butler	Liberal Federation	1923–1938	Albert Robinson	Liberal Federation	1923–1924
James McLachlan Jr.	Liberal Federation	1923–1930	Richard Layton Butler	Liberal Federation	1923–1938	Allan Robertson	Labor	1924–1927
James McLachlan Jr.	Liberal Federation	1923–1930	Richard Layton Butler	Liberal Federation	1923–1938	Archie Cameron	Country	1927–1932
Samuel Dennison	Country	1930–1932	Richard Layton Butler	Liberal Federation	1923–1938	Archie Cameron	Country	1927–1932
Samuel Dennison	Liberal and Country	1932–1938	Richard Layton Butler	Liberal and Country	1932–1938	Archie Cameron	Liberal and Country	1932–1934
Samuel Dennison	Liberal and Country	1932–1938	Richard Layton Butler	Liberal and Country	1932–1938	Albert Robinson	Independent	1934–1938
