= 1921 South Australian state election =

- 9 April 1921

All 46 seats in the South Australian House of Assembly 24 seats were needed for a majority
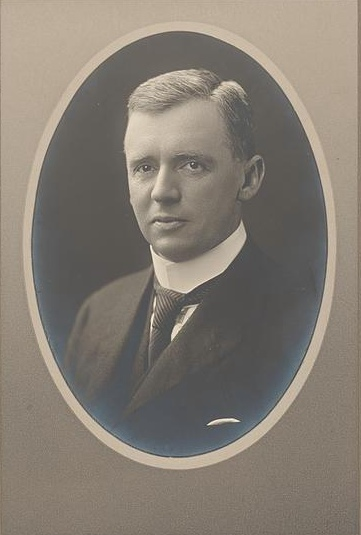

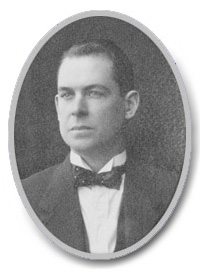
	First party	Second party
Leader	Henry Barwell	John Gunn
Party	Liberal Union	Labor
Leader since	8 August 1920	1918
Leader's seat	Stanley	Adelaide
Last election	22 seats	17 seats
Seats won	25 seats	16 seats
Seat change	▲3	▼1
Percentage	34.90%	44.62%
Swing	▲6.96	▲0.08
Premier before election
Henry Barwell
Liberal Union
Elected Premier
Henry Barwell
Liberal Union

State elections were held in South Australia on 9 and 16 April 1921. All 46 seats in the South Australian House of Assembly were up for election. The incumbent Liberal Union government led by Premier of South Australia Henry Barwell defeated the opposition Australian Labor Party led by Leader of the Opposition John Gunn. Each district elected multiple members, with voters casting multiple votes.

The coalition between the National Labor Party and the Liberal Union had collapsed in 1920, and the National Labor Party contested the election as the Progressive Country Party.

Arrangement of the House of Assembly after the 1921 state election.

South Australian state election, 9 April 1921 House of Assembly << 1918–1924 >>
Enrolled voters	289,843				
Votes cast	161,165		Turnout	62.71%	-1.06%
Informal votes	1,774		Informal	N/A	
Summary of votes by party
Party	Primary votes	%	Swing	Seats	Change
Labor	179,308	44.62%	-0.07%	16	1
Liberal Union	140,229	34.90%	+6.96%	25	+ 3
Progressive Country	51,603	12.84%	-5.82%	1	5
Farmers and Settlers	16,417	4.09%	-0.18%	4	+ 3
Independent	14,288	3.56%	-0.28%	0	± 0
Total	401,845			46	

== See also ==
- Results of the 1921 South Australian state election (House of Assembly)
- Candidates of the South Australian state election, 1921
- Members of the South Australian House of Assembly, 1921–1924
- Members of the South Australian Legislative Council, 1921–1924
