= Allan Robertson (politician) =

Australian politician (1853–1929)

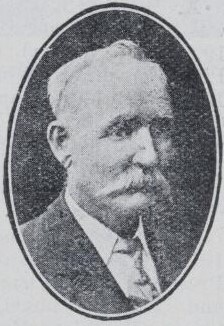

Allan Robertson (9 January 1853 – 19 October 1929) was an Australian politician who represented the South Australian House of Assembly multi-member seat of Wooroora from 1918 to 1921 and 1924 to 1927 for the Labor Party.
