= James McLachlan (Australian politician) =

Australian politician

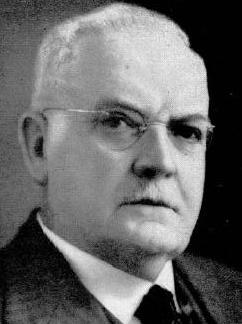

Senator for South Australia
- In office 1 July 1935 – 30 June 1947

Member for Wooroora
- In office 6 April 1918 – 31 January 1930

Personal details
- Born: 9 March 1871 Alma, South Australia
- Died: 1 December 1956 (aged 85) Kensington
- Party: UAP (1935–45); Liberal (1945–47)
- Spouse: Ellen Louisa Jury
- Children: Four
- Parent(s): James and Catherine McLachlan
- Occupation: Farmer, storekeeper, stock agent

James McLachlan (9 March 1871 – 1 December 1956) was an Australian politician. Born in Alma in the Mid North of South Australia, he was educated at Winham College before becoming a farmer at Dalkey near where he grew up. His parents James and Catherine, had both immigrated from Scotland.

McLachlan married Ellen Louisa Jury in 1894 and abandoned farming in 1902 following a severe drought. After working as a storekeeper and agent, he was elected to the South Australian House of Assembly as the Liberal member for Wooroora in 1918, serving until 1930. His father had held the same seat from 1893 to 1902. He resigned on 31 January 1930 to take up an appointment on the Pastoral Board of South Australia.

In the 1934 election, McLachlan was elected to the Australian Senate as a United Australia Party Senator for South Australia, taking the seat from 1 July 1935. He served as Chairman of Committees from 1938 to 1941. McLachlan held his seat until his retirement in 1946 (by which time he was a member of the Liberal Party). He died in 1956.
