= Joseph Anthony Harper =

Australian politician

Joseph Anthony Harper (23 November 1867 – 1 September 1939) was an Australian businessman and politician. He was a long-serving chairman of the District Council of Burnside, a City of Adelaide councillor, and a one-term member of the South Australian House of Assembly from 1921 to 1924, representing the multi-member seat of East Torrens for the Liberal Union and its successor the Liberal Federation.

Harper was born in Woodstock in Oxfordshire, England. His family migrated to Australia when he was seven, and settled in Ipswich in Queensland. He worked as a draper's assistant in Toowoomba and Brisbane, before moving to Adelaide, where he managed the clothing department in the Matthew Goode & Co. warehouse. He later became a clothing manufacturer, forming Kurtz & Harper with Abraham Kurtz. He would remain managing director of the firm, later renamed the National Clothing Manufacturing Company, until his death. Harper was prominent in business circles, serving as president of the Adelaide Chamber of Manufactures from 1917 to 1920, as president of the Associated Chamber of Manufactures of Australia from 1920 to 1921, and as a member of the executive of the Employers' Federation.

Harper was elected as a District Council of Burnside councillor in 1911. He served as chairman from 1918 to 1934, when he became the first mayor of Burnside; he left office as mayor at the end of 1935 but would remain on the council until his death. While Burnside chairman, he served one term in the House of Assembly representing the conservative Liberal Federation. He was elected to the House in 1921, but retired in 1924 in protest at his party's decision in government to order to order railway rolling stock from the United States rather than build it locally or in the United Kingdom. Harper was elected as a City of Adelaide councillor in 1934, representing Hindmarsh ward; he subsequently resigned in 1938 to stand in a by-election for an alderman position, which he won unopposed. He also served as a member of the Municipal Tramways Trust and the East Torrens Board of Health.

He died at Calvary Hospital in 1939, following a heart attack while recovering from an operation, and was cremated. An extension to the Burnside Town Hall was named the "J. A. Harper Memorial Wing" in his honour that December.
