= 1924 South Australian state election =

1924 state election in South Australia

- 5 April 1924

All 46 seats in the South Australian House of Assembly 24 seats were needed for a majority
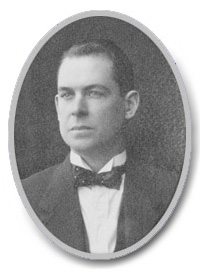

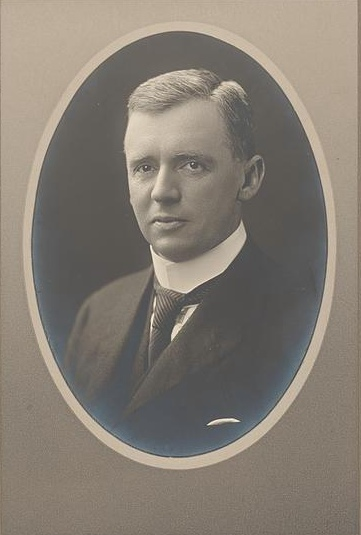
	First party	Second party
Leader	John Gunn	Henry Barwell
Party	Labor	Liberal Federation
Leader since	1918	8 August 1920
Leader's seat	Adelaide	Stanley
Last election	16 seats	25 seats
Seats won	27 seats	17 seats
Seat change	▲11	▼8
Percentage	48.35%	41.70%
Swing	▲3.73	▲6.80
Premier before election
Henry Barwell
Liberal Federation
Elected Premier
John Gunn
Labor

State elections were held in South Australia on 5 April 1924. All 46 seats in the South Australian House of Assembly were up for election. The incumbent Liberal Federation government led by Premier of South Australia Henry Barwell was defeated by the opposition Australian Labor Party led by Leader of the Opposition John Gunn. Each district elected multiple members, with voters casting multiple votes.

The Farmers and Settlers Association became known as the Country Party from this election.

== Results ==
Arrangement of the House of Assembly after the 1924 state election.

South Australian state election, 5 April 1924 House of Assembly << 1921–1927 >>
Enrolled voters	289,843				
Votes cast	161,165		Turnout	62.71%	-1.06%
Informal votes	1,774		Informal	N/A	
Summary of votes by party
Party	Primary votes	%	Swing	Seats	Change
Labor	192,256	48.35%	+3.73%	27	+ 11
Liberal Federation	165,802	41.70%	+6.80%	17	8
Country	35,551	8.94%	+8.94%	2	+ 2
Independents	1,827	0.46%	-3.10%	0	0
Votes for other parties	2,176	0.55%	+0.55%	0	0
Total	397,612			46	

== See also ==
- Results of the South Australian state election, 1924 (House of Assembly)
- Candidates of the South Australian state election, 1924
- Members of the South Australian House of Assembly, 1924–1927
- Members of the South Australian Legislative Council, 1924–1927
