= David James (Australian politician) =

Australian politician

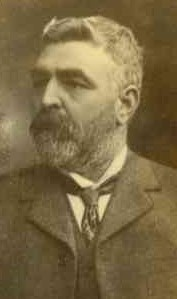

David James (1854 – 21 July 1926) was an Australian politician who represented the South Australian House of Assembly multi-member seat of Wooroora from 1902 to 1918 for the Australasian National League and the Liberal Union.

== History ==
James was born in Nantyglo, Monmouthshire, Wales, son of Rees James and his wife Mary, and worked in the coal-mines as a youth. In 1877, after the death of his father, he emigrated to South Australia with his mother, sister, and brothers Edward and Evan aboard Lochee, arriving in February 1877, and they settled in Kapunda.

He worked in various areas of the country as a contractor, and while sinking dams on Mount Gipps sheep-station, he and his mate Jim Poole were persuaded to join Charles Rasp in pegging mineral claims on what would become Broken Hill, the world's largest silver-lead-zinc mine. Led by George McCulloch, the "Syndicate of Seven" pegged further claims in the area and formed the Broken Hill Mining Company, later to become Broken Hill Proprietary. James sold half his share for £110; another quarter for £1800, but his remaining quarter share would entitle him to 500 shares in BHP.

He returned to Kapunda, and was elected to the city council, serving as mayor 1888–1889 and 1900–1905, electing to have his mayoral allowance directed to local charities. He built a residence in the township, then in 1895 he purchased from James White a property "Albert Vale" which he renamed "Coalbrook Vale", around two miles from Kapunda on the Eudunda road.

James was business partner with Rees Rees as owners of the H. B. Hawke & Co. engineering works of Kapunda from 1895 to 1903 when Rees became sole proprietor. In 1909 he became part-owner of the Kapunda Herald.

He was also known as a greyhound and racehorse owner and breeder; his dog Witchcraft sired many champions, and his horses include Auraria (Melbourne Cup and VRC Victorian Oaks in 1895) and Broken Hill, winner of the Australian Cup in 1894.

== Family ==
On 19 February 1883 James married Emily Davies (c. 1856 – 19 March 1925), daughter of William Davies (died 13 April 1910) of Clydach, near Abergavenny, Wales. Their children include:

- Alice Mary James (1886–1971) married Dr Walter Eugene Deravin (1878 – 28 June 1941) on 10 April 1907
- Edmund Rees James (1888–1952) married Marjorie Eulelia Bickford (1891–1971) of Kapunda in 1917. He was Lieut. James of 5th Reinforcements, 3rd Light Horse Regiment in 1915. She was a daughter of John Pepperell Bickford.
- Emily Lois James (30 October 1891 – 31 March 1933) married Frank Kennington Taylor (1898–1980) of Walkerville

He married again, to Ada Mullen (died 29 August 1949) in 1925. Ada was daughter of Kapunda saddler John Mullen (died 17 May 1890).

Evan James (1859 – 21 September 1908) was a younger brother, builder and mayor of Kapunda. He married Catharine Elizabeth Meincke on 30 May 1882. Their children include:

- David Ludwig James (1896–1954) of Kapunda served with Australian Flying Corps in WWI, married Ada in 1925
- Philippa Myra Elizabeth "Myra" James (1894–1970) married Leslie John Miller in 1923
- Myfanwy James (1902– ) married Herbert Walter Trevena (died 1972) in 1934

== See also ==
- Hundred of James
