= Harry Kneebone =

Australian politician (1876–1933)

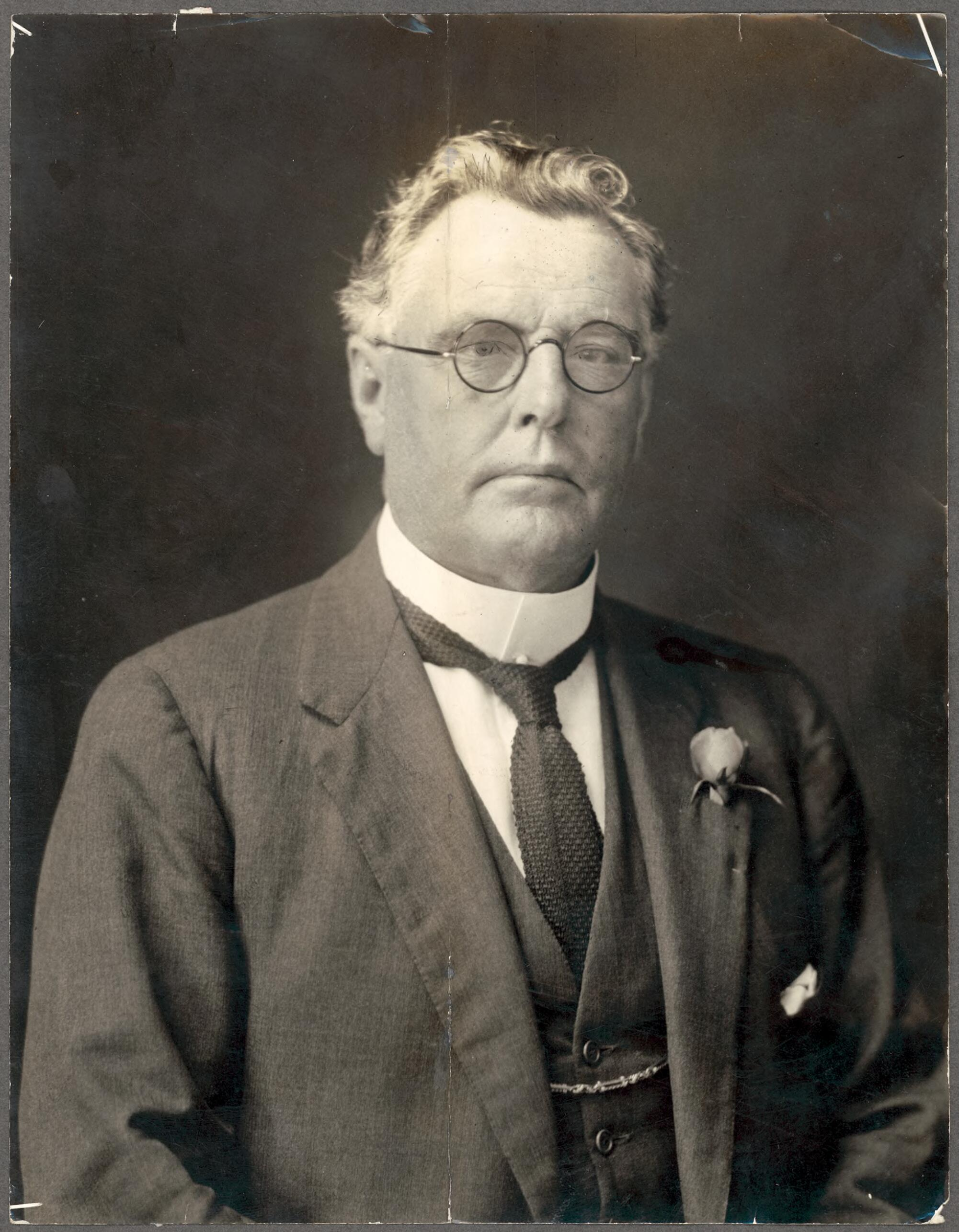

Senator for South Australia
- In office 1 April 1931 – 18 December 1931
- Preceded by: John Chapman
- Succeeded by: Jack Duncan-Hughes

Personal details
- Born: Henry Kneebone; 17 March 1876 Kadina, South Australia
- Died: 22 December 1933 (aged 57) Adelaide, South Australia
- Party: Labor
- Occupation: Journalist, editor

Henry Kneebone (17 March 1876 – 22 December 1933) was an Australian journalist, author, editor and politician.

== Early life ==
He was born at Kadina, South Australia in 1876, son of Henry Kneebone of Cornwall and Elizabeth Ann (née Tonkin). In 1899, he began working as a journalist at the Kadina and Wallaroo Times under David Bews, and five years later joined the gold rush to Western Australia, where he began working for the Coolgardie Miner, subsequently becoming its editor. The Coolgardie Miner ceased publication around the end of 1909. He joined the Daily Herald, a Labor Party publication in Adelaide, in 1910 and was made editor in 1911. In 1912 he was appointed press officer to the High Commission in London where he performed useful service. He founded the Anzac Buffet, which supplied more than a million free meals to Australian soldiers in London. In 1916 he returned to Adelaide and editorship of the Daily Herald, which had fallen on hard times. He was unable to reverse its decline and the paper went into voluntary liquidation in 1924.

== Politics ==
In 1924 he was elected to the South Australian House of Assembly but resigned the following year to contest (unsuccessfully) the House of Representatives seat of Boothby. In 1931 he was appointed to the Australian Senate as a Labor Senator for South Australia, filling the casual vacancy caused by the death of Country Party Senator John Chapman, but lost it in the election of later that year. He returned to journalism, as the editor of The Labor Advocate, a Trades Hall publication.

== Personal life ==
Kneebone died in 1933. His death notice in The Advertiser mentioned his editorship of the Advocate but not his political career.

He showed great concern and affection for the Aboriginal peoples and was fascinated by their culture. His Methodist views influenced his social democratic politics.

Henry Kneebone (1876–1933) married Henrietta Whitta (1875 – 17 January 1951) on 4 November 1903; they lived in Jellicoe Avenue, Kings Park. Their children included:

- Harry William Kneebone (1904–) married Dorothy Hollow of Tusmore on 17 March 1928
- Alfred Francis "Frank" Kneebone (1905–) Frank was elected State Secretary of the Printers Union in 1951. He was a member of the Legislative Council of South Australia from 1961 to 1975
- (Elizabeth) Thelma Kneebone (1907–) married Paul Mills of Unley Park on 29 June 1944
- Ethelwyn "Wyn" Kneebone (1909–) married Ern Dickason of Hawthorn ca.1945
- Joan Adelaide Kneebone (1916–) married Newton S. Tiver of Beachport ca.1944
