= Leslie Claude Hunkin =

Australian politician

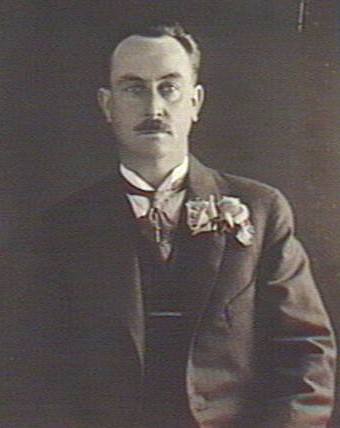

Leslie Claude Hunkin (10 January 1884 – 8 September 1984) was an Australian politician who represented the South Australian House of Assembly multi-member seat of East Torrens from 1921 to 1927 for the Labor Party.
