= List of elections in South Australia =

This is a list of state elections in South Australia for the bicameral Parliament of South Australia, consisting of the House of Assembly (lower house) and the Legislative Council (upper house).

2026	Election	Candidates	Members (House)	Members (Council)	Results (House)	Results (Council)
2022	Election	Candidates	Members (House)	Members (Council)	Results (House)	Results (Council)
2018	Election	Candidates	Members (House)	Members (Council)	Results (House)	Results (Council)
2014	Election	Candidates	Members (House)	Members (Council)	Results (House)	Results (Council)
2010	Election	Candidates	Members (House)	Members (Council)	Results (House)	Results (Council)
2006	Election	Candidates	Members (House)	Members (Council)	Results (House)	Results (Council)
2002	Election	Candidates	Members (House)	Members (Council)	Results (House)	Results (Council)
1997	Election	Candidates	Members (House)	Members (Council)	Results (House)	Results (Council)
1993	Election	Candidates	Members (House)	Members (Council)	Results (House)	Results (Council)
1989	Election	Candidates	Members (House)	Members (Council)	Results (House)	Results (Council)
1985	Election	Candidates	Members (House)	Members (Council)	Results (House)	Results (Council)
1982	Election	Candidates	Members (House)	Members (Council)	Results (House)	Results (Council)
1979	Election	Candidates	Members (House)	Members (Council)	Results (House)	Results (Council)
1977	Election	Candidates	Members (House)	Members (Council)	Results (House)	N/A, house-only
1975	Election	Candidates	Members (House)	Members (Council)	Results (House)	Results (Council)
1973	Election	Candidates	Members (House)	Members (Council)	Results (House)	Results (Council)
1970	Election	Candidates	Members (House)	Members (Council)	Results (House)	N/A, house-only
1968	Election	Candidates	Members (House)	Members (Council)	Results (House)	Results (Council)
1965	Election	Candidates	Members (House)	Members (Council)	Results (House)	Results (Council)
1962	Election	Candidates	Members (House)	Members (Council)	Results (House)	Results (Council)
1959	Election	Candidates	Members (House)	Members (Council)	Results (House)	Results (Council)
1956	Election	Candidates	Members (House)	Members (Council)	Results (House)	Results (Council)
1953	Election	Candidates	Members (House)	Members (Council)	Results (House)	Results (Council)
1950	Election	Candidates	Members (House)	Members (Council)	Results (House)	Results (Council)
1947	Election	Candidates	Members (House)	Members (Council)	Results (House)	Results (Council)
1944	Election	Candidates	Members (House)	Members (Council)	Results (House)	Results (Council)
1941	Election	Candidates	Members (House)	Members (Council)	Results (House)	Results (Council)
1938	Election	Candidates	Members (House)	Members (Council)	Results (House)	Results (Council)
1933	Election	Candidates	Members (House)	Members (Council)	Results (House)	Results (Council)
1930	Election	Candidates	Members (House)	Members (Council)	Results (House)	Results (Council)
1927	Election	Candidates	Members (House)	Members (Council)	Results (House)	Results (Council)
1924	Election	Candidates	Members (House)	Members (Council)	Results (House)	Results (Council)
1921	Election	Candidates	Members (House)	Members (Council)	Results (House)	Results (Council)
1918	Election	Candidates	Members (House)	Members (Council)	Results (House)	Results (Council)
1915	Election	Candidates	Members (House)	Members (Council)	Results (House)	Results (Council)
1912	Election	Candidates	Members (House)	Members (Council)	Results (House)	Results (Council)
1910	Election	Candidates	Members (House)	Members (Council)	Results (House)	Results (Council)
1906	Election	Candidates	Members (House)	Members (Council)	Results (House)	Results (Council)
1905	Election	Candidates	Members (House)	Members (Council)	Results (House)	Results (Council)
1902	Election	Candidates	Members (House)	Members (Council)	Results (House)	Results (Council)
1899	Election	Candidates	Members (House)	Members (Council)	Results (House)	Results (Council)
1896	Election	Candidates	Members (House)	Members (Council)	Results (House)	Results (Council)
1893	Election	Candidates	Members (House)	Members (Council)	Results (House)	Results (Council)
1890	Election	Candidates	Members (House)	Members (Council)	Results (House)	Results (Council)
1887	Election	Candidates	Members (House)	Members (Council)	Results (House)	Results (Council)
1884	Election	Candidates	Members (House)	Members (Council)	Results (House)	Results (Council)
1881	Election	Candidates	Members (House)	Members (Council)	Results (House)	Results (Council)
1878	Election	Candidates	Members (House)	Members (Council)	Results (House)	Results (Council)
1875	Election	Candidates	Members (House)	Members (Council)	Results (House)	Results (Council)
1871	Election	Candidates	Members (House)	Members (Council)	Results (House)	Results (Council)
1870	Election	Candidates	Members (House)	Members (Council)	Results (House)	Results (Council)
1868	Election	Candidates	Members (House)	Members (Council)	Results (House)	Results (Council)
1865	Election	Candidates	Members (House)	Members (Council)	Results (House)	Results (Council)
1862	Election	Candidates	Members (House)	Members (Council)	Results (House)	Results (Council)
1860	Election	Candidates	Members (House)	Members (Council)	Results (House)	Results (Council)
1857	Election	Candidates	Members (House)	Members (Council)	Results (House)	Results (Council)
1855	Election	Candidates		Members (Council)		Results (Council)
1851	Election	Candidates		Members (Council)		Results (Council)
1843				Members (Council)		
1836				Members (Council)		

== See also ==
- List of South Australian House of Assembly by-elections
- List of South Australian Legislative Council appointments
- List of South Australian Legislative Council by-elections
- Electoral districts of South Australia
- Timeline of Australian elections
- Electoral results for the Australian Senate in South Australia
