= Members of the South Australian Legislative Council, 1894–1897 =

This is a list of members of the South Australian Legislative Council from 1894 to 1897.

This was the fourth Legislative Council to be affected by the amendments to the Constitution, which provided for the Colony to be divided into four districts: (1) Central; (2) Southern; (3) North-Eastern and (4) Northern, with six members in each division; one third of each to be replaced in rotation every three years. (Previously, the whole colony acted as one electoral district "The Province" with one third replaced at General Elections every four years.)

Name	District	Party	Time in office	Notes
Henry Adams	Central	Labor	1894–1902	
Arthur Richman Addison	Northern		1888–1915	
Richard Chaffey Baker	Southern		1877–1901	
Martin Peter Friedrich Basedow	North-Eastern		1894–2000	
John George Bice	Northern		1894–1923	
Allan Campbell	Northern		1878–1898	
David Morley Charleston	Central	Labor	1891–Aug. 1897	
John Darling Sr.	Northern		1888–1897	
John Duncan	North-Eastern	NDL	1891–1896; 1900–1913	
Henry Robert Fuller	Central	NDL	1894–1900	
John Hannah Gordon	Southern		1888–1892; 1893-1903	
Robert Storrie Guthrie	Southern	Labor	1891–1902; 1902–1903	
William Haslam	North-Eastern		1891–1897	
Andrew Alexander Kirkpatrick	Central	Labor	1891–1897; 1900–1909; 1918–1928	
Gregor McGregor	Southern	Labor	1894–1901	
Sylvanus James Magarey	Central		1888–1897	
James Martin	North-Eastern	NDL	1885–1899	
James O'Loghlin	Northern	Labor	1888–1902	
William Alfred Robinson	Central	Labor	1893–1900	
William Russell	North-Eastern	Labor	1894–2000	
Sir Edwin Thomas Smith	Southern		1894–1902	
John Lancelot Stirling	Southern		1891–1932	
Ebenezer Ward	Northern		1891–1900	
John Warren	North-Eastern / Midland		1888–1912	
