= Members of the South Australian Legislative Council, 1897–1900 =

Political figures

This is a list of members of the South Australian Legislative Council from 1897 to 1900.

This was the fifth Legislative Council to be affected by the amendments to the constitution in 1881, which provided for the colony to be divided into four districts: (1) Central; (2) Southern; (3) North-Eastern and (4) Northern, with six members in each division; one third of each to be replaced in rotation every three years. Previously, the whole colony acted as one electoral district, "the province," with one-third replaced at general elections every four years.)

Name	District	Party	Time in office	Notes
Henry Adams	Central	Labor	1894–1902	
Arthur Richman Addison	Northern		1888–1915	
Richard Chaffey Baker	Southern		1877–1901	
Martin Peter Friedrich Basedow	North-Eastern		1894–1900	
John George Bice	Northern		1894–1923	
Allan Campbell	Northern		1878–1898	Died 30 October 1898
David Morley Charleston	Central		1891–1901	left Labor Party Aug. 1897
Henry Robert Fuller	Central	ANL	1894–1900	
John Hannah Gordon	Southern		1888–1892; 1893-1903	
Robert Storrie Guthrie	Central	Labor	1891–1903	
William Haslam	North-Eastern		1891–1898	died May 1898
James Henderson Howe	Northern		1897–1918	
John Lewis	North-Eastern		1898–1923	elected Jun. 1898
Gregor McGregor	Southern	Labor	1894–1901	
James Martin	North-Eastern	ANL	1894–1899	
James O'Loghlin	Northern	Labor	1888–1902	
William Alfred Robinson	Central	Labor	1893–1900	
William Russell	North-Eastern	Labor	1894–1900	
Alexander Wallace Sandford	Southern		1897–1902	
Sir Edwin Thomas Smith	Southern		1894–1902	
John Lancelot Stirling	Southern		1891–1932	
Andrew Tennant	Northern		1898–1902	Elected 26 November 1898
Samuel Tomkinson	Central		1897–1900	Previously represented Southern District 1885–1894; died August 1900
Ebenezer Ward	Northern		1891–1900	
John Warren	North-Eastern		1888–1912	
Charles Willcox	North-Eastern		1897–1902	
