= 13th Parliament of South Australia =

1890–1893 meeting of the South Australian Parliament

Thirteenth Parliament of South Australia
| ← | 12th | 14th | → |
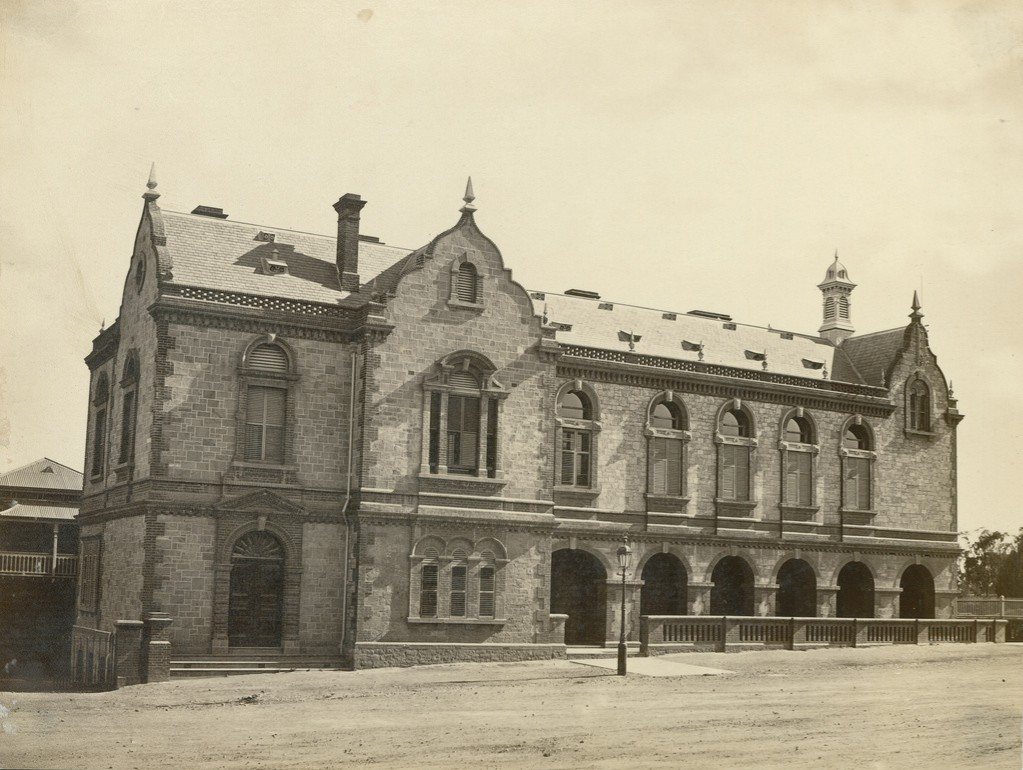
- Old Parliament House (1872)

Overview
- Legislative body: Parliament of South Australia
- Meeting place: Old Parliament House
- Term: 5 June 1890 – 21 March 1893
- Election: 9–23 April 1890

Legislative Council
- Members: Independent (20); United Labor (3); National Defence League (2)
- President: Henry Ayers

House of Assembly
- Members: Independent (52); National Defence League (2); United Labor (2)
- Speaker: Jenkin Coles

Sessions
- 1st: 5 June 1890 – 23 December 1890
- 2nd: 4 June 1891 – 19 December 1891
- 3rd: 9 June 1892 – 17 December 1892

The 13th Parliament of South Australia was a meeting of the legislative branch of the South Australian state government, composed of the South Australian Legislative Council and the South Australian House of Assembly.

== Leadership ==
Legislative Council

- President of the Legislative Council: Henry Ayers
- Clerk of the Legislative Council: Edwin Gordon Blackmore
- Clerk's assistant and Sergeant-at-arms: John Cummins Morphett

House of Assembly

- Speaker of the House of Assembly: Jenkin Coles
- Chairman of Committees: Alfred Catt
- Clerk of the House of Assembly: Frederick Halcomb, Edwin Gordon Blackmore (acting Clerk in 1892)
- Clerk's assistant and Sargeant-at-arms: Albert Egerton Wilby

== Membership ==
=== Legislative Council ===
==== Until May 1891 ====
Members elected in 1888 are marked with an asterisk (*).

▌ Arthur Richman Addison (Northern)*
▌ John Howard Angas (Central)
▌ Henry Ayers (North-Eastern)*
▌ Richard Chaffey Baker (Southern)
▌ John Bosworth (North-Eastern)
▌ Henry Edward Bright (North-Eastern)
▌ Allan Campbell (Northern)
▌ William Copley (Northern)

▌ George Witherage Cotton (Central)*
▌ John Hannah Gordon (Southern)*
▌ John Darling, sen. (Northern)*
▌ Alexander Hay
▌ Friedrich Edouard Heinrich Wulf Krichauff (Southern)*
▌ Sylvanus James Magarey (Central)*
▌ James Martin (North-Eastern)
▌ David Murray

▌ James O'Loghlin (Northern)*
▌ Maurice Salom
▌ Henry Scott (Central)
▌ William Knox Simms (Central)
▌ Alfred Muller Simpson (Central)
▌ Samuel Tomkinson (Southern)
▌ John Warren (North-Eastern)*
▌ William West-Erskine (Southern)

==== From May 1891 ====
8 of the 24 seats in the upper house were contested in the elections in May 1891. Members elected in 1891 are marked with an asterisk (*).

Central

▌ John Howard Angas
▌ David Morley Charleston*
▌ George Witherage Cotton
▌ Robert Storrie Guthrie*
▌ Sylvanus James Magarey
▌ Alfred Muller Simpson

Southern

▌ Richard Chaffey Baker*
▌ John Hannah Gordon
▌ Andrew Alexander Kirkpatrick*
▌ Friedrich Edouard Heinrich Wulf Krichauff
▌ John Lancelot Stirling
▌ Samuel Tomkinson

North-Eastern

▌ Henry Ayers
▌ John Bosworth
▌ John James Duncan*
▌ William Haslam*
▌ James Martin
▌ John Warren

Northern

▌ Arthur Richman Addison
▌ Allan Campbell*
▌ William John Copley
▌ John Darling, sen.
▌ James Vincent O'Loghlin
▌ Ebenezer Ward*

=== House of Assembly ===
Albert

▌ George Ash
▌ Andrew Dods Handyside

Barossa

▌ John William Downer
▌ James Hague

Burra

▌ Frederick William Holder
▌ George Hingston Lake

East Adelaide

▌ John Abel McPherson
▌ Johann Theodor Scherk

East Torrens

▌ Thomas Playford
▌ Edwin Thomas Smith

Encounter Bay

▌ Henry Edward Downer
▌ John Robert Kelly

Flinders

▌ William Horn
▌ John Moule

Frome

▌ Clement Giles
▌ Laurence O'Loughlin

Gladstone

▌ Alfred Catt
▌ James Henderson Howe

Gumeracha

▌ Theodore Hack
▌ Robert Homburg

Light

▌ Jenkin Coles
▌ James Wharton White

Mount Barker

▌ John Alexander Cockburn
▌ Albert Henry Landseer

Newcastle

▌ Thomas Burgoyne
▌ Joseph Hancock

Noarlunga

▌ William James Blacker
▌ Alexander McDonald

North Adelaide

▌ Lewis Cohen
▌ George Charles Hawker

Northern Territory

▌ John Langdon Parsons
▌ Vaiben Louis Solomon

Onkaparinga

▌ Robert Caldwell
▌ Joseph Colin Francis Johnson

Port Adelaide

▌ George Feltham Hopkins
▌ William Benjamin Rounsevell

Stanley

▌ Peter Paul Gillen
▌ John Miller

Sturt

▌ John Greeley Jenkins
▌ William Frederick Stock

Victoria

▌ James Cock
▌ John James Osman

Wallaroo

▌ Henry Allerdale Grainger
▌ Richard Hooper

West Adelaide

▌ Lawrence Grayson
▌ Charles Cameron Kingston

West Torrens

▌ Thomas Henry Brooker
▌ Benjamin Gould

Wooroora

▌ John William Castine
▌ Robert Kelly

Yatala

▌ Richard Butler
▌ William Gilbert

Yorke Peninsula

▌ Harry Bartlett
▌ Henry Lamshed

== Changes of membership ==
=== Legislative Council ===
| Seat | Before | | Change | | After | | |
| Seat | Member | Party | Type | Date | Date | Member | Party |
|---|---|---|---|---|---|---|---|
| Southern | Vacant | | | | 28 June 1890 | Friedrich Edouard Heinrich Wulf Krichauff | Independent |
| Southern | Richard Chaffey Baker | Independent | Joined party | 1 August 1891 | | Richard Chaffey Baker | National Defence League |
| Central | George Witherage Cotton | Independent | Died | 16 December 1892 | Vacant | | |
| Southern | John Hannah Gordon | Independent | Resigned | 16 December 1892 | Vacant | | |

=== House of Assembly ===
| Seat | Before | | Change | | After | | |
| Seat | Member | Party | Type | Date | Date | Member | Party |
|---|---|---|---|---|---|---|---|
| Yatala | James Cowan | Independent | Died | 21 July 1890 | 13 August 1890 | Richard Butler | Independent |
| Wooroora | Hugh Craine Kelly | Independent | Died | 13 January 1891 | 25 February 1891 | Robert Kelly | Independent |
| Wallaroo | David Bews | Independent | Died | 24 February 1891 | 23 May 1891 | Richard Hooper | United Labor |
| Northern Territory | Vaiben Louis Solomon | Independent | Resigned | 5 March 1891 | 25 May 1891 | Vaiben Louis Solomon | Independent |
| Barossa | John William Downer | Independent | Joined party | 22 July 1891 | | John William Downer | National Defence League |
| Frome | Laurence O'Loughlin | Independent | Joined party | 23 July 1891 | | Laurence O'Loughlin | National Defence League |
| East Adelaide | John Cox Bray | Independent | Resigned | 6 January 1892 | 23 January 1892 | John Abel McPherson | United Labor |
| Noarlunga | Charles James Dashwood | Independent | Resigned | 24 February 1892 | 26 March 1892 | William James Blacker | Independent |

== See also ==
- Members of the South Australian Legislative Council, 1888–1891
- Members of the South Australian Legislative Council, 1891–1894
- Members of the South Australian House of Assembly, 1890–1893
