= List of South Australian Legislative Council by-elections =

This is a list of historical by-elections for the South Australian Legislative Council. They were caused by the resignation or death of an incumbent member.

== History ==
From inauguration until the 1975 election and the introduction of South Australian Legislative Council appointments, casual vacancies in the Legislative Council, like the House of Assembly, were also filled at by-elections. Amendments to the South Australian Constitution and Electoral Acts in that year saw the whole state become a single electorate for the Legislative Council and gave, in line with the Australian Senate, an assembly of members of both Houses of Parliament the right to meet to choose a replacement member. The constitution also states that if the previous sitting Legislative Council member was at the time of his/her election the representative of a particular political party, that party should nominate a replacement from amongst its own members.

== List of by-elections ==
Gains for Labor are highlighted in red; for Liberal and its predecessors in blue; and others in grey.

By-election	Date	Incumbent	Party	Winner	Party	Cause
The Province	3 April 1860	Arthur Henry Freeling; Edward Castres Gwynne		George Marsden Waterhouse; George Tinline		Resigned; Failure to attend
The Province	7 August 1863	Thomas Shuldham O'Halloran; William Scott; George Tinline		Edward McEllister; Thomas Elder; John Baker		Resigned; Resigned; Failure to attend
The Province	26 September 1866	Judah Moss Solomon; Samuel Davenport; Edward McEllister; George Fife Angas		Thomas Hogarth; John Hodgkiss; Henry Mildred; John Tuthill Bagot		Resigned; Resigned; Died; Resigned
The Province	26 November 1866	Charles Bonney		William Parkin		Resigned
The Province	6 August 1867	Abraham Scott, Thomas Magarey, George Hall		John Crozier, William Morgan, Emanuel Solomon		Resigned; Resigned; Death
Uncontested	4 July 1870	John Tuthill Bagot		John B. Neales		Resigned
The Province	4 October 1871	John Henry Barrow; Augustine Stow; Emanuel Solomon		William Storrie; Thomas Elder; Philip Santo		Resigned (3)
The Province	22 September 1873	John B. Neales		William Sandover		Deceased
The Province	10 September 1878	Thomas English; William Storrie; Thomas Elder; William Everard		Henry Scott; Allan Campbell; John Hodgkiss; Charles Burney Young		Resigned; Resigned; Resigned; Failure to attend the Parliament
The Province	7 July 1880	Walter Duffield; Henry Kent Hughes; Charles Burney Young		John Dunn Jr. James Garden Ramsay; Alexander Borthwick Murray		Resigned (3)
Central	28 February 1884	Sir William Morgan		William Knox Simms		Deceased
Southern	7 July 1885	Thomas English		Samuel Tomkinson		Deceased
North-Eastern	28 June 1886	George Witherage Cotton		John Bosworth		Resigned
Central	25 June 1887	John Crozier; John Brodie Spence		Alfred Muller Simpson; John Howard Angas		Deceased; Resigned
Northern	6 July 1887	William Dening Glyde		William Copley		Resigned
Northern	11 July 1888	William Wadham		Arthur Richman Addison		Resigned
Southern	28 June 1890	James Garden Ramsay		Friedrich Eduard Heinrich Wulf Krichauff		Deceased
Southern	11 July 1891	W. A. E. West-Erskine		John Lancelot Stirling		Resigned
Central	15 April 1893	George Witherage Cotton		William Alfred Robinson		Deceased
Southern	15 April 1893	John Hannah Gordon		John Hannah Gordon		Resigned due to financial difficulties, but stood for the vacant seat and was elected
Central	11 September 1897	David Charleston	United Labour Party	David Morley Charleston	Independent	Resigned
North-Eastern	4 June 1898	William Haslam		John Lewis		Deceased
Northern	26 November 1898	Allan Campbell		Andrew Tennant		Deceased
North East uncontested	31 March 1900	James Martin		John James Duncan		Deceased
Central	22 September 1900	Samuel Tomkinson		Charles Cameron Kingston		Deceased
Central uncontested	9 February 1901	Charles Cameron Kingston		John Langdon Parsons		Resigned
Central uncontested	1 June 1901	David Morley Charleston		George Brookman		Seated in Federal Parliament
Southern	8 June 1901	Gregor McGregor, Richard Chaffey Baker		Alfred von Doussa, George Riddoch		Seated in Federal Parliament (2)
Central	19 September 1903	John Langdon Parsons		Hugo Carl Emil Muecke		Deceased
Southern uncontested	14 December 1903	John Hannah Gordon		Louis von Doussa		Resigned
Central	19 December 1903	Robert Storrie Guthrie		Beaumont Arnold Moulden		Resigned
Central	20 October 1906	Henry Thompson	Independent	David Jelley	Labor	Death
Central	3 November 1906	Joseph Vardon	Independent	James Phillips Wilson	Labor	Resignation
Central	2 March 1907	David Jelley	Labor	Frederick Samuel Wallis	Labor	Death
Central	15 May 1909	Andrew Kirkpatrick	Labor	Theodore Bruce	Independent	Death
Central	5 August 1911	Theodore Bruce	Liberal	Charles Morris	Liberal	Death
Midland	15 November 1913	John Duncan	Liberal	David Gordon	Liberal	Death
Southern	16 August 1915	John Downer	Liberal	Joseph Botterill	Liberal	Death
Central No. 2	20 August 1915	Ern Klauer	Labor	William Humphrey Harvey	Labor	Death
Southern	9 October 1920	Joseph Botterill	Liberal	Thomas McCallum	Liberal	Death
Central No. 1	27 October 1928	Andrew Kirkpatrick	Labor	Frank Condon	Labor	Death
Central No. 1	17 August 1929	John Carr	Labor	Stanley Whitford	Labor	Death
Central No. 1	24 October 1931	Tom Gluyas	Labor	Joseph Anderson	Independent	Death
Southern	17 June 1932	Lancelot Stirling	LCL	Reuben Cranstoun Mowbray	LCL	Death
Northern	20 October 1934	William Morrow	LCL	Lyell McEwin	LCL	Death
Central No. 2	14 December 1935	William Humphrey Harvey	LCL	Edward Holden	LCL	Death
Southern	18 June 1938	Thomas McCallum	LCL	Alec Bagot	Independent	Death
Northern	2 September 1939	Hartley Gladstone Hawkins	LCL	James Beerworth	Labor	Death
Midland	1 November 1948	Douglas Peel Gordon	LCL	Colin Rowe	LCL	Death
Northern	14 May 1949	Percy Blesing	LCL	Robert Richard Wilson	LCL	Death
Southern	26 May 1949	Norman Brookman	LCL	John Lancelot Cowan	LCL	Death
Central No. 1	24 October 1951	Oscar Oates	Labor	Stan Bevan	Labor	Death
Midland	26 February 1955	Reginald Rudall	LCL	Ross Story	LCL	Death
Central No. 1	16 September 1961	Frank Condon	Labor	Alfred Kneebone	Labor	Death
Midland	20 October 1962	Alexander Melrose	LCL	Les Hart	LCL	Death
Southern	15 December 1962	Allan Hookings	LCL	Ren DeGaris	LCL	Death
Southern	19 June 1964	Geoffrey Giles	LCL	Henry Kemp	LCL	Resignation
Central No. 2	4 December 1965	Frank Perry	LCL	Murray Hill	LCL	Death
Northern	29 October 1966	Dudley Octoman	LCL	Arthur Whyte	LCL	Resignation
Southern	2 June 1967	Les Densley	LCL	Victor George Springett	LCL	Resignation
Central No. 1	15 May 1970	Stan Bevan	Labor	Tom Casey	Labor	Resignation
Midland	12 September 1970	Colin Rowe	LCL	Keith Russack	LCL	Death
Southern	3 July 1971	Norman Jude	LCL	Martin Cameron	LCL	Resignation
Southern	11 August 1973	Henry Kemp	LCL	John Burdett	LCL	Death

== See also ==
- List of South Australian House of Assembly by-elections
- List of South Australian Legislative Council appointments
