= Members of the South Australian Legislative Council, 1900–1902 =

This is a list of members of the South Australian Legislative Council from 1900 to 1902.

This was the sixth Legislative Council to be affected by the amendments to the Constitution in 1881, which provided for the Colony to be divided into four districts: (1) Central; (2) Southern; (3) North-Eastern and (4) Northern, with six members in each division; one third of each to be replaced in rotation every three years. (Previously, the whole colony acted as one electoral district "The Province" with one third replaced at General Elections every four years.)

It was the first Legislative Council to be affected by provisions of the (State) Constitution Act 779 of 1901, which provided for, inter alia, a reduction in the number of seats from 24 to 18, realignment of District borders to encompass Assembly electorates, six-year terms (one half of the Council retiring every three years), and elections held jointly with the House. As a result of this Act, brought in to realise some of the savings promised by Federation, a number of members had their expected terms cut short.

Name	District	Party	Time in office	Notes
Henry Adams	Central	Labor	1894–1902	vacated by Act 1902
Arthur Addison	Northern		1888–1915	
Richard Baker	Southern		1877–1901	
John George Bice	Northern		1894–1923	
George Brookman	Central		1901–1910	
David Charleston	Central		1897–1901	
John Duncan	North-Eastern	ANL	1891–1896; 1900–1913	
Kossuth William Duncan	Northern		1900–1902	vacated by Act 1902
John Hannah Gordon	Southern		1888–1892; 1893–1903	resigned Dec. 1903
Robert Guthrie	Central	Labor	1891–1902; 1902–1903	
James Henderson Howe	Northern		1897–1918	
Charles Kingston	Central		1900	resigned Dec. 1900
Andrew Kirkpatrick	Central		1891–1897; 1900–1909; 1918–1928	
John Lewis	North-Eastern; Northern		1898–1902; 1902–1923	vacated by Act 1902
Edward Lucas	North-Eastern	ANL	1900–1918	
Gregor McGregor	Southern	Labor	1894–1901	
James O'Loghlin	Northern	Labor	1888–1902	vacated by Act 1902
John Langdon Parsons	Central	ANL	1901–1903	
Thomas Pascoe	North-Eastern		1900–1933	
George Riddoch	Southern	ANL	1901–1910	
Alexander Wallace Sandford	Southern		1897–1902	vacated by Act 1902
Sir Edwin Thomas Smith	Southern		1894–1902	vacated by Act 1902
Lancelot Stirling	Southern		1891–1932	
Andrew Tennant	Northern		1898–1902	vacated by Act 1902
Samuel Tomkinson	Southern; Central		1885–1894; 1897–1900	died Aug.1900
Joseph Vardon	Central		1900–1906	
Alfred von Doussa	Southern		1901–1921	
John Warren	North-Eastern		1888–1912	
Charles Willcox	North-Eastern		1897–1902	vacated by Act 1902
