= 12th Parliament of South Australia =

1887–1890 meeting of the South Australian Parliament

Twelfth Parliament of South Australia
←	11th	13th	→
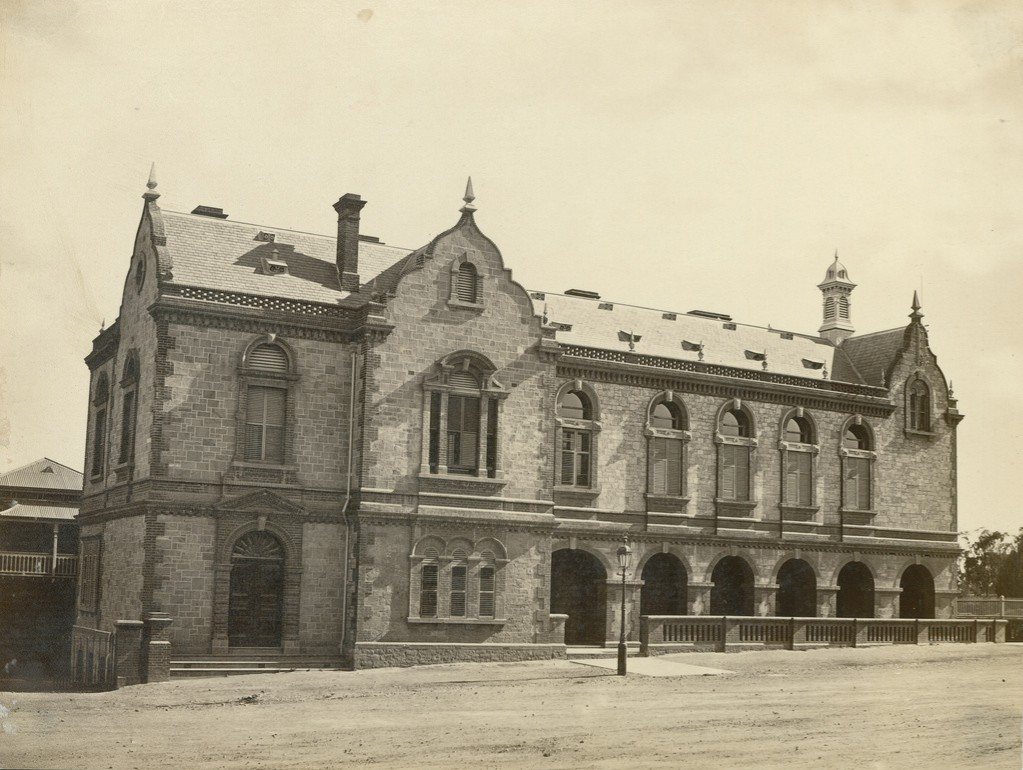
- Old Parliament House (1872)

Overview
- Legislative body: Parliament of South Australia
- Meeting place: Old Parliament House
- Term: 2 June 1887 – 19 March 1890
- Election: 19 March – 21 April 1887

Legislative Council
- Members: 24
- President: Henry Ayers

House of Assembly
- Members: 52
- Speaker: Robert Dalrymple Ross (until 31 May 1888); John Cox Bray (from 31 May 1888)

Sessions
- 1st: 2 June 1887 – 9 December 1887
- 2nd: 13 December 1887 – 17 December 1887
- 3rd: 31 May 1888 – 8 December 1888
- 4th: 6 June 1889 – 6 December 1889

The 12th Parliament of South Australia was a meeting of the legislative branch of the South Australian state government, composed of the South Australian Legislative Council and the South Australian House of Assembly.

== Leadership ==
Legislative Council

- President of the Legislative Council: Henry Ayers
- Clerk of the Legislative Council: Edwin Gordon Blackmore
- Clerk's assistant and Sergeant-at-arms: Albert Egerton Wilby (until 18 April 1888), John Cummins Morphett (from 18 April 1888)

House of Assembly

- Speaker of the House of Assembly: Robert Dalrymple Ross (until 31 May 1888), John Cox Bray (from 31 May 1888)
- Chairman of Committees: Ebenezer Ward
- Clerk of the House of Assembly: Frederick Halcomb
- Clerk's assistant and Sargeant-at-arms: John Cummins Morphett (until 18 May 1888), Albert Egerton Wilby (from 18 April 1888)

== Membership ==
=== Legislative Council ===
==== Until May 1888 ====
Members elected in 1885 are marked with an asterisk (*).

▌ John Howard Angas (Central)
▌ Henry Ayers
▌ Richard Chaffey Baker (Southern)*
▌ John Bosworth (North-Eastern)
▌ Henry Edward Bright (North-Eastern)*
▌ William Christie Buik
▌ Allan Campbell (Northern)*
▌ William Copley (Northern)

▌ John Dunn, jun.
▌ Alexander Hay
▌ James Martin (North-Eastern)*
▌ Alexander Borthwick Murray
▌ David Murray
▌ John Pickering
▌ James Garden Ramsay
▌ James Rankine

▌ Maurice Salom
▌ Henry Scott (Central)*
▌ William Knox Simms (Central)
▌ Alfred Muller Simpson (Central)*
▌ Robert Alfred Tarlton
▌ Samuel Tomkinson (Southern)
▌ William Wadham (Northern)*
▌ William West-Erskine (Southern)*

==== From May 1888 ====
9 of the 24 seats in the upper house were contested in the elections in May 1888. Members elected in 1888 are marked with an asterisk (*).

▌ Arthur Richman Addison (Northern)*
▌ John Howard Angas (Central)
▌ Henry Ayers (North-Eastern)*
▌ Richard Chaffey Baker (Southern)
▌ John Bosworth (North-Eastern)
▌ Henry Edward Bright (North-Eastern)
▌ Allan Campbell (Northern)
▌ William Copley (Northern)

▌ George Witherage Cotton (Central)*
▌ John Hannah Gordon (Southern)*
▌ John Darling, sen. (Northern)*
▌ Alexander Hay
▌ Sylvanus James Magarey (Central)*
▌ James Martin (North-Eastern)
▌ David Murray
▌ James O'Loghlin (Northern)*

▌ James Garden Ramsay (Southern)*
▌ Maurice Salom
▌ Henry Scott (Central)
▌ William Knox Simms (Central)
▌ Alfred Muller Simpson (Central)
▌ Samuel Tomkinson (Southern)
▌ John Warren (North-Eastern)*
▌ William West-Erskine (Southern)

=== House of Assembly ===
Albert

▌ Andrew Dods Handyside
▌ Beaumont Arnold Moulden

Barossa

▌ Martin Peter Friedrich Basedow
▌ John William Downer

Burra

▌ Frederick William Holder
▌ William Benjamin Rounsevell

East Adelaide

▌ John Cox Bray
▌ Johann Theodor Scherk

East Torrens

▌ Edwin Thomas Smith
▌ Saul Solomon

Encounter Bay

▌ Henry Edward Downer
▌ Charles Henry Hussey

Flinders

▌ William Austin Horn
▌ John Moule

Frome

▌ Clement Giles
▌ Ebenezer Ward

Gladstone

▌ Alfred Catt
▌ James Henderson Howe

Gumeracha

▌ Robert Homburg
▌ John Lancelot Stirling

Light

▌ Jenkin Coles
▌ Paddy Glynn

Mount Barker

▌ John Alexander Cockburn
▌ Albert Henry Landseer

Newcastle

▌ Thomas Burgoyne
▌ Thomas Playford

Noarlunga

▌ Charles James Dashwood
▌ Alexander McDonald

North Adelaide

▌ Lewis Cohen
▌ George Charles Hawker

Onkaparinga

▌ Joseph Colin Francis Johnson
▌ Rowland Rees

Port Adelaide

▌ George Feltham Hopkins
▌ William Edward Mattinson

Stanley

▌ Peter Paul Gillen
▌ Charles Kimber

Sturt

▌ John Greeley Jenkins
▌ William Frederick Stock

Victoria

▌ Friedrich Edouard Heinrich Wulf Krichauff
▌ John James Osman

Wallaroo

▌ David Bews
▌ Luke Lidiard Furner

West Adelaide

▌ Lawrence Grayson
▌ Charles Cameron Kingston

West Torrens

▌ Benjamin Gould
▌ Benjamin Nash

Wooroora

▌ John William Castine
▌ John James Duncan

Yatala

▌ Josiah Howell Bagster
▌ William Gilbert

Yorke Peninsula

▌ Harry Bartlett
▌ Robert Caldwell

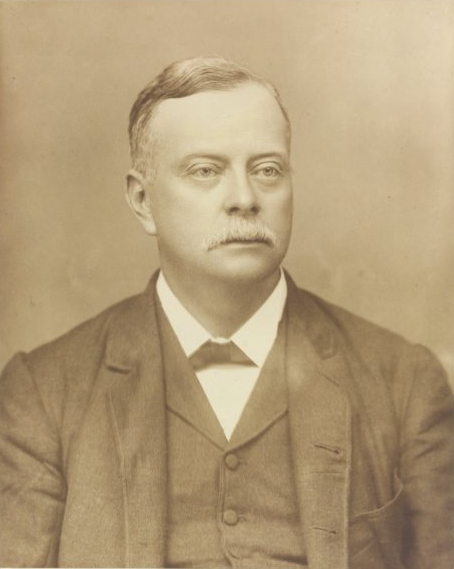
House of Assembly Speaker
John Cox Bray (from 1888)

== Changes of membership ==
=== Legislative Council ===
Seat	Before	Change		After	
Seat	Member	Type	Date	Date	Member
Central	John Crozier	Died	2 June 1887	25 June 1887	Alfred Muller Simpson
Central	John Brodie Spence	Resigned	2 June 1887	25 June 1887	John Howard Angas
Northern	William Dening Glyde	Resigned	2 June 1887	6 July 1887	William Copley
Northern	William Wadham	Resigned	31 May 1888	Vacant	

=== House of Assembly ===
Seat	Before	Change		After	
Seat	Member	Type	Date	Date	Member
Gumeracha	Robert Dalrymple Ross	Died	27 December 1887	12 May 1888	John Lancelot Stirling
Victoria	Daniel Livingston	Died	30 September 1888	1 November 1888	John James Osman
Stanley	Edward William Hawker	Resigned	28 May 1889	25 June 1889	Peter Paul Gillen

== See also ==
- Members of the South Australian Legislative Council, 1885–1888
- Members of the South Australian Legislative Council, 1888–1891
- Members of the South Australian House of Assembly, 1887–1890
