= Members of the South Australian Legislative Council, 1873–1877 =

This is a list of members of the South Australian Legislative Council from 1873 to 1877.

This was the fifth Legislative Council to be elected under the Constitution of 1856, which provided for a house consisting of eighteen members to be elected from the whole colony acting as one electoral district "The Province"; that six members, selected by lot, should be replaced at General Elections after four years, another six to be replaced four years later and thenceforth each member should have a term of twelve years.

Seven seats were contested – six by the "effluxion of time" (Ayers, Hodgkiss, Hogarth, Mildred, Morphett and Tuxford) and one to replace John Baker, who died the previous May.

Name	Time in office	Term expires	Notes
Henry Ayers	1857–1888; 1888–1893	Feb. 1881	
John Crozier	1867–1887	Feb. 1877	
Walter Duffield	1873–1880		elected Feb. 1873
John Dunn	1869–1877	Feb. 1877	
Thomas Elder	1863–1869; 1871–1878		
Thomas English	1865–1878; 1882–1885		
William Everard	1873–1878		elected Feb. 1873
Joseph Fisher	1873–1881	Feb. 1881	
Alexander Hay	1873–1881	Feb. 1881	elected Feb. 1873
Thomas Hogarth	1866–1885		
William Milne	1869–1881	Feb. 1881	
William Morgan	1867–1884	Feb. 1877	
John Bentham Neales	1872–1873		died 1873
Alexander Borthwick Murray	1869–1877	Feb. 1877	
William Parkin	1866–1877	Feb. 1877	
William Sandover	1873–1885		elected Sep. 1873
Philip Santo	1871–1881	Feb. 1881	
William Storrie	1871–1878		
Robert Alfred Tarlton	1873–1881	Feb. 1881	elected Feb. 1873
