= Members of the South Australian Legislative Council, 1902–1905 =

This is a list of members of the South Australian Legislative Council from 1902 to 1905.

It was the first Legislative Council to be fully determined by provisions of the (State) Constitution Act 779 of 1901, which provided for, inter alia, a reduction in the number of seats from 24 to 18, realignment of District borders to encompass Assembly electorates, six-year terms (one half of the Council retiring every three years), and elections held jointly with the House of Assembly.

Name	District	Party	Time in office	Notes
Arthur Richman Addison	Northern		1888–1915	
John George Bice	Northern		1894–1923	
George Brookman	Central		1901–1910	
John Duncan	North-Eastern	ANL	1891–1896; 1900–1913	
John Hannah Gordon	Southern		1888–1892; 1893–1903	resigned Dec. 1903
Robert Storrie Guthrie	Central	Labor	1891–1903	resigned Nov. 1903 to contest Senate
James Henderson Howe	Northern		1897–1918	
Andrew Alexander Kirkpatrick	Central	Labor	1891–1897; 1900–1909; 1918–1928	
John Lewis	Northern		1898–1923	changed district 1902 election
Edward Lucas	North-Eastern	ANL	1900–1918	
Beaumont Arnold Moulden	Central	ANL	1903–1912	elected Dec. 1903
Hugo Carl Emil Muecke	Central		1903–1910	elected Sep. 1903
John Langdon Parsons	Central	ANL	1901–1903	died Aug. 1903
Thomas Pascoe	North-Eastern		1900–1933	
George Riddoch	Southern	ANL	1901–1910	
John Lancelot Stirling	Southern		1891–1932	
Henry W. Thompson	Central		1902–1906	
Joseph Vardon	Central		1900–1906	
Alfred von Doussa	Southern		1901–1921	
Louis von Doussa	Southern		1903–1905	elected Dec. 1903
John Warren	North-Eastern		1888–1912	
