= Members of the South Australian Legislative Council, 1869–1873 =

This is a list of members of the South Australian Legislative Council from 1869 to 1873.

This was the fourth Legislative Council to be elected under the Constitution of 1856, which provided for a house consisting of eighteen members to be elected from the whole colony acting as one electoral district "The Province"; that six members, selected by lot, should be replaced at General Elections after four years, another six to be replaced four years later and thenceforth each member should have a term of twelve years.

Seven seats were contested – six by the "effluxion of time" (Baker, Barrow, Elder, English, Everard and Peacock) and one to replace Charles Hervey Bagot, who resigned the previous December.

Name	Time in office	Term expires	Notes
Henry Ayers	1857–1888; 1888–1893	Feb. 1873	
John Tuthill Bagot	1866–1870	Feb. 1877	
John Baker	1851–1861; 1863–1872	Feb. 1869	died 1872
John Henry Barrow	1861–1871	Feb. 1869	resigned September 1871
John Crozier	1867–1887	Feb. 1877	
John Dunn	1869–1877	Feb. 1877	
Thomas Elder	1863–1869; 1871–1878	Feb. 1869	elected October 1871
Thomas English	1865–1878; 1882–1885	Feb. 1869	
John Hodgkiss	1866–1872; 1878–1884	Feb. 1877	
Thomas Hogarth	1866–1885	Feb. 1873	
Henry Mildred	1866–1873	Feb. 1873	
William Milne	1869–1881	Feb. 1881	
William Morgan	1867–1884	Feb. 1877	
John Morphett	1851–1873	Feb. 1873	
Alexander Borthwick Murray	1869–1877	Feb. 1877	
John Bentham Neales	1872–1873		elected July 1872; died 1873
William Parkin	1866–1877	Feb. 1877	
Philip Santo	1871–1881	Feb. 1881	elected October 1871
Emanuel Solomon	1867–1871	Feb. 1877	resigned September 1871
William Storrie	1871–1878		elected October 1871
Augustine Stow	1869–1871		resigned September 1871
William Wedd Tuxford	1865–1873	Feb. 1873	
