= Members of the South Australian Legislative Council, 1865–1869 =

This is a list of members of the South Australian Legislative Council from 1865 to 1869.

This was the third Legislative Council to be elected under the Constitution of 1856, which provided for a house consisting of eighteen members to be elected from the whole colony acting as one electoral district "The Province"; that six members, selected by lot, should be replaced at General Elections after four years, another six to be replaced four years later and thenceforth each member should have a term of twelve years. Eight members were elected – six by the "effluxion of time" and two to replace members Forster and Waterhouse who resigned the previous December.

Name	Time in office	Term expires	Notes
George Fife Angas	1851–1866		reelected 1865; resigned August 1866
Henry Ayers	1857–1888; 1888–1893	Feb. 1873	reelected 1865
Charles Hervey Bagot	1851–1853; 1857–1861; 1865–1869	Feb. 1873	reelected 1865
John Tuthill Bagot	1866–1870	Feb. 1877	filled vacancy September 1866
John Baker	1851–1861; 1863–1872	Feb. 1869	
John Henry Barrow	1861–1871	Feb. 1869	
Charles Bonney	1865–1866		resigned August 1866
John Crozier	1867–1887	Feb. 1877	filled vacancy August 1867
Samuel Davenport	1855–1866	Feb. 1873	resigned August 1866
Thomas Elder	1863–1869; 1871–1878	Feb. 1869	
Thomas English	1865–1878; 1882–1885	Feb. 1869	
Charles George Everard	1857–1869	Feb. 1869	
George Hall	1851–1867	Feb. 1869	died July 1867
John Hodgkiss	1866–1872; 1878–1884	Feb. 1877	filled vacancy September 1866
Thomas Hogarth	1866–1885	Feb. 1873	filled vacancy September 1866
Edward McEllister	1863–1866		died May 1866
Thomas Magarey	1865–1867		resigned July 1867
Henry Mildred	1866–1873	Feb. 1873	filled vacancy September 1866
William Morgan	1867–1884	Feb. 1877	filled vacancy August 1867
John Morphett	1851–1873	Feb. 1873	reelected 1865
William Parkin	1866–1877	Feb. 1877	filled vacancy September 1866
William Peacock	1861–1869	Feb. 1869	
Abraham Scott	1857–1867	Feb. 1873	resigned July 1867
Emanuel Solomon	1867–1871	Feb. 1877	filled vacancy August 1867 resigned September 1871
Judah Moss Solomon	1861–1866	Feb. 1873	resigned August 1866
William Wedd Tuxford	1865–1873	Feb. 1873	
