= 1902 South Australian state election =

South Australian state election

- 3 May 1902

All 42 seats in the South Australian House of Assembly 22 seats were needed for a majority
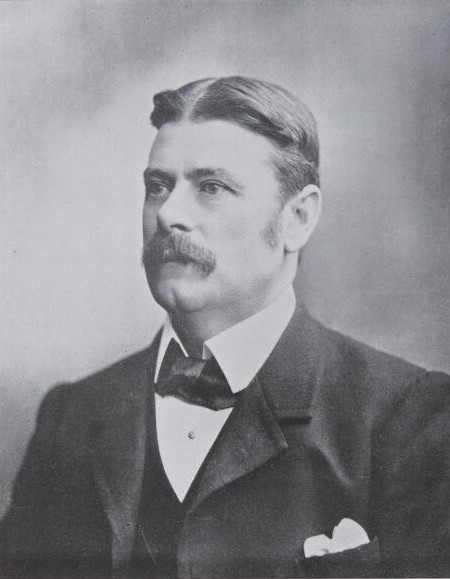

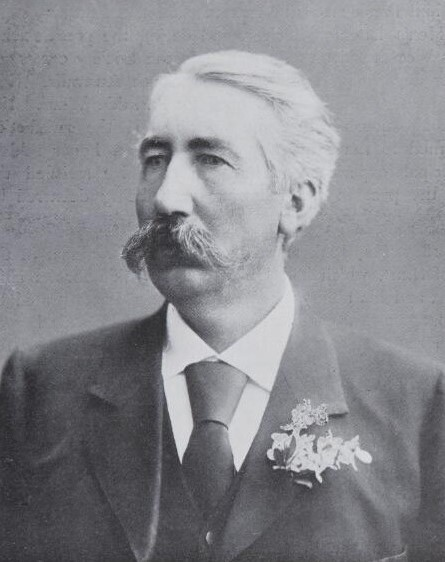

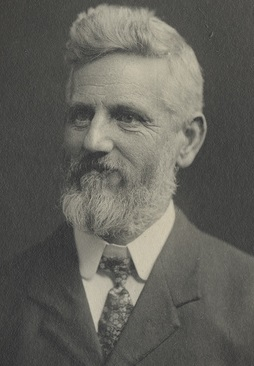
	First party	Second party	Third party
Leader	John Darling Jr.	John Jenkins	Thomas Price
Party	Conservative	Liberal	United Labor
Leader since	1902	1901	1899
Leader's seat	Torrens	Torrens	Torrens
Last election	28 seats	14 seats	11 seats
Seats won	19	12	5
Seat change	▼9	▼2	▼6
Percentage	27.25	24.26	19.09
Swing	▼6.45%	▲2.28%	▼6.35%
- Results by electoral district for the House of Assembly
Premier before election
John Jenkins
Liberal
Elected Premier
John Jenkins
Liberal

The 1902 South Australian state election was held on 3 May 1902 following the dissolution of both houses. All 42 seats in the South Australian House of Assembly were up for election, and all 18 seats in the Legislative Council. The House had a reduction of 12 seats compared to the previous election. The Council was reduced from 6 members in each of four districts to 6 members from Central District and four from each of North-Eastern, Northern and Southern Districts. The incumbent liberal government led by Premier of South Australia John Jenkins in an informal coalition with the conservatives defeated the United Labor Party (ULP) led by Thomas Price. Each of the 13 districts elected multiple members, with voters casting multiple votes.

== Background ==
Following the 1899 election, Charles Kingston tried again for franchise reform. The Assembly voted against the measure and Kingston resigned his ministry. He was replaced by Vaiben Louis Solomon for a brief period of seven days, until Frederick Holder formed a government which, for the first time, included a ULP member, Lee Batchelor.

The parliament was transformed by the impact of federation. Seven leading members of the Assembly resigned and were elected to the Parliament of Australia. As a result, there were 11 by-elections in this period. The Assembly was reduced in numbers, from 54 to 42. A redistribution was carried out following these changes, to produce a chamber elected from 13 districts - one 5-member, two four-member, nine 3-member and one 2-member electorates. The election was a "new start" for the parliament.

There was no "Liberal" or "Kingston" party, but there was a relatively cohesive Kingston group among both independent members and candidates. The Liberal and Democratic Union would not be formed until the 1906 election.

== Results ==
House of Assembly (FPTP) (Non-CV)
Party	Votes	%	Swing	Seats	Change
Conservative	69,275	27.25	−6.45	19	▼9
Liberal	61,664	24.26	+2.28	12	▼2
United Labor	48,515	19.09	−6.35	5	▼6
Independent Liberal	33,275	13.09	+13.09	4	▲4
Independent	10,542	4.15	+0.79	2	▲1
Other	30,928	12.17	−3.37	0	Steady
Formal votes	254,199				
Informal votes	1,118				
Total	255,317			42	
Registered voters / turnout	149,177	60.34			

== See also ==
- Members of the South Australian House of Assembly, 1902–1905
- Members of the South Australian Legislative Council, 1902–1905
