= Members of the South Australian Legislative Council, 1861–1865 =

This is a list of members of the South Australian Legislative Council from 1861 to 1865.

This was the second Legislative Council to be elected under the Constitution of 1856, which provided for a house consisting of eighteen members to be elected from the whole State acting as one Electoral District; that six members, selected by lot, should be replaced at General Elections after four years, another six to be replaced four years later and thenceforth each member should have a term of twelve years.

Name	Time in office	Term expires	Previously represented	Notes
George Fife Angas	1851–1866	Feb. 1865	Barossa	
Henry Ayers	1857–1869	Feb. 1869		
Charles Hervey Bagot	1851–1853; 1857–1861; 1865–1869	Feb. 1861	Light	
John Baker	1851–1861; 1863–1872	Feb. 1861	Mount Barker	Elected to vacant seat August 1863
John Henry Barrow	1861–	Feb. 1873		
Samuel Davenport	1855–1866	Feb. 1873	Non-Official nominee	
Charles Davies MD	1857–	Feb. 1865		
Thomas Elder	1863–			elected to vacant seat August 1863
Charles G. Everard	1857–	Feb. 1869		
James Hurtle Fisher	1855–	Feb. 1865	Non-Official nominee	
Anthony Forster	1855–1864	Feb. 1873	West Adelaide	retired December 1864
Arthur Henry Freeling	1855–1859	Feb 1861	Official nominee (Surveyor-General)	resigned August 1859
Edward Castres Gwynne	1851–1859	Feb. 1861	Non-Official nominee	vacated seat August 1859 to take Supreme Court judge post
George Hall	1851–1867	Feb. 1869	Port Adelaide	
Edward McEllister	1863–1866			elected to vacant seat August 1863
John Morphett	1851–	Feb. 1865	Non-Official nominee	
Thomas Shuldham O'Halloran	1857–1863	Feb. 1865		retired June 1863
William Peacock	1861–	Feb. 1873		
Abraham Scott	1857–1867	Feb. 1873		resigned 1867
William Scott	1855–1863	Feb. 1869	Port Adelaide	Resigned 1863
Judah Moss Solomon	1861–1866	Feb. 1873		
Edward Stirling	1855–	Feb. 1865	Non-Official nominee	
George Tinline	1860–1863	Feb. 1869		elected April 1860 to fill vacancy Seat declared vacant June 1863
George Waterhouse	1860–1864	Feb. 1869		elected April 1860 to fill vacancy Resigned December 1864
William Younghusband	1851–1861	Feb. 1861	Stanley	
