= 1857 South Australian Legislative Council election =

1857 South Australian colonial election (Legislative Council)
- 9 March 1857

All 18 seats in the South Australian Legislative Council
- Registered: 10,092
- Turnout: 5,717 (56.7%)

The 1857 South Australian Legislative Council election was held on 9 March 1857 to elect all 18 members of the South Australian Legislative Council as part of the 1857 South Australian colonial election.

== Overall results ==
Legislative Council (BV) – Turnout 56.7% (Non-CV)
Party	Votes			Seats			
Party	Votes	%	Swing (pp)	Seats won	Not up	New Total	Change
Independent	66,842	100.0	±0.0	18	0	18	Steady
Total	66,842	100.0	–	18	0	18	
Formal votes	4,942	86.4	+86.4				
Informal votes	775	13.6	+13.6				
Turnout	5,717	56.7	+56.7				
Enrolled voters	10,092	–	–				
Source: Electoral Commission of South Australia

== South Australia ==
1857 South Australian colonial election: The Province
Candidate	Votes	%	±
Thomas Shuldham O'Halloran (elected 1)	3,499	5.2	+5.2
John Baker (elected 2)	3,475	5.2	+5.2
William Younghusband (elected 3)	3,460	5.2	+5.2
John Morphett (elected 4)	3,339	5.0	+5.0
Edward Castres Gwynne (elected 5)	3,274	4.9	+4.9
Anthony Forster (elected 6)	3,209	4.8	+4.8
Abraham Scott (elected 7)	2,897	4.3	+4.3
Edward Stirling (elected 8)	2,855	4.3	+4.3
William Scott (elected 9)	2,847	4.3	+4.3
James Hurtle Fisher (elected 10)	2,717	4.1	+4.1
George Hall (elected 11)	2,676	4.0	+4.0
Charles Hervey Bagot (elected 12)	2,595	3.9	+3.9
Henry Ayers (elected 13)	2,587	3.9	+3.9
Samuel Davenport (elected 14)	2,488	3.7	+3.7
Arthur Henry Freeling (elected 15)	2,473	3.7	+3.7
Charles Davies (elected 16)	2,363	3.5	+3.5
George Fife Angas (elected 17)	2,316	3.5	+3.5
Charles George Everard (elected 18)	2,177	3.3	+3.3
Thomas Lipson	2,072	3.1	+3.1
David Sutherland	2,053	3.1	+3.1
William Peacock	2,043	3.1	+3.1
Philip Butler	1,920	2.8	+2.8
Arthur Hardy	1,876	2.8	+2.8
Henry Rodolph Wigley	1,545	2.3	+2.3
Emanuel Solomon	1,393	2.1	+2.1
Samuel Stocks	1,361	2.0	+2.0
Henry Strangways	1,332	2.0	+2.0
Total formal votes	4,942	86.4	+86.4
Informal votes	775	13.6	+13.6
Turnout	5,717	56.7	+56.7

== See also ==
- 1857 South Australian House of Assembly election
