= Candidates of the 1941 South Australian state election =

This is a list of candidates of the 1941 South Australian state election.

== Retiring MPs ==
=== Liberal and Country League ===
- Walter Hannaford MLC (Midland District) – retired
- Hermann Homburg MLC (Central District No. 2) – lost preselection
- Harry Dove Young MLC (Southern District) – retired

=== Independent ===
- George Connor (Alexandra) – retired

The seat of Glenelg had remained vacant following the death of incumbent independent MHA William Fisk on 18 December 1940. Stanley Liberal MHA Alexander Melrose switched houses at the election, being elected unopposed for Midland Province.

== Legislative Assembly ==
Sitting members are shown in bold text. Successful candidates are marked with an asterisk.

Electorate	Labor candidates	Liberal and Country candidates	Other candidates
Adelaide	Bob Dale		**Doug Bardolph*** (Ind. Labor); Thomas Garland (Ind. Labor)
Albert		**Malcolm McIntosh***	J. J. Cronin (Ind.); A. J. Parker (Ind.)
Alexandra		Herbert Hudd*	
Angas	J. F. W. Schulz	**Reginald Rudall***	W. F. Haese (Ind.)
Burnside	S. A. Pyle	**Charles Abbott***	E. W. Chaston (Ind.)
Burra	T. J. Canny	**Archibald McDonald***	
Chaffey	R. H. Curren		**William MacGillivray*** (Ind.)
Eyre		**Arthur Christian***	J. P. Moore (Single Tax)
Flinders	R. F. Poole	Rex Pearson*	**Edward Craigie** (Single Tax)
Frome	**Mick O'Halloran***		
Gawler	**Leslie Duncan***	F. E. Waddy	W. T. Duggan (Ind.)
Glenelg	S. E. C. Gay	Frank Smith*	
Goodwood	Frank Walsh*	H. G. Dall	**George Illingworth** (Ind.)
Gouger		H. T. Chapman	**Albert Robinson*** (Ind.)
Gumeracha		**Thomas Playford IV***	
Hindmarsh	**John McInnes***		Bessie Mountford (Ind.); W. H. Stratton (Ind.)
Light	Sydney McHugh*	**Herbert Michael**	L. H. Ellis (Ind.)
Mitcham	L. G. Pilton	**Henry Dunks***	H. J. Kemp (Ind.)
Mount Gambier	F. E. Young	L. J. Laslett	**John Fletcher*** (Ind.)
Murray	Clement Collins	George Cummins Morphett	**Richard McKenzie*** (Ind. Labor)
Newcastle		**George Jenkins***	
Norwood	**Frank Nieass**	Roy Moir*	R. W. Davis (Ind.)
Onkaparinga	C. T. Hasse	**Howard Shannon***	Frank Staniford (Ind.)
Port Adelaide	**James Stephens***		G. D. Coffey (Ind.)
Port Pirie	**Andrew Lacey***		
Prospect	T. E. Lawton	**Elder Whittle***	M. E. Dodd (Ind.)
Ridley	J. V. Lloyd	W. A. Blight; J. H. Strangman	**Tom Stott*** (Ind.)
Rocky River	J. H. Jenner	**John Lyons***	
Semaphore	**Albert Thompson***	H. J. Harden	
Stanley	Percy Quirke*	H. M. Bohnsack	
Stirling		A. M. Fuller	**Herbert Dunn*** (Ind.); F. C. Keen (Ind.); Lindsay Yelland (Ind.)
Stuart	**Lindsay Riches***		Charles Hobbs (Single Tax)
Torrens	J. L. Atkinson	**Shirley Jeffries***	C. W. Lloyd (Ind.)
Thebarton	Sid O'Flaherty		**Jules Langdon*** (Ind.)
Unley		Colin Dunnage*	Ada Bromham (Ind.); **John McLeay, Sr.** (Ind.)
Victoria	John Daly	Vernon Petherick*	**Clement Smith** (Ind.)
Wallaroo	**Robert Richards***		
Yorke Peninsula	H. A. Dolling	Cecil Hincks*	**Daniel Davies** (Ind.)
Young		**Robert Nicholls***	

== Legislative Council ==
Electorate	Labor candidates	Liberal and Country candidates	Grouped Independent candidates	Other candidates
Central District No. 1 (2)	Ken Bardolph*; Oscar Oates*			R. A. Cilento (Ind.); A. O. R. Tapp (Ind.); Stanley Whitford (Ind. Labor)
Central District No. 2 (2)	Tom Howard; William Harvey	Ernest Anthoney*; Collier Cudmore*		
Midland District (2)		Ernest William Castine*; Alexander Melrose*		
Northern District (2)	James Beerworth*; J. S. Marner	Percy Blesing*; A. J. Watt		
Southern District (2)		Jack Bice*; Norman Brookman*	Alec Bagot; J. L. Wishart	
