= Constitution Act Further Amendment Act 1881 =

South Australian constitutional amendment

The Constitution Act Further Amendment Act 1881, No. 236 of 1881, long title "An Act to further amend "The Constitution Act"", was an act of the government of South Australia to amend the Constitution of South Australia. Its purpose was to amend the terms of the Constitution Act 1856 in order to increase the size of the Legislative Council of South Australia from 18 to 24 members, and also to divide the province into four electoral districts each to elect six of the members.

It also introduced a process for resolving deadlock between the two houses of parliament. It repealed section 8 of the Constitution Act and section 3 of the Electoral Districts Act 1872 (Act no 27 of 1872) which had required the Legislative Council to be elected from one electoral district.

An immediate consequence of the new act was a special election in 1882 for the whole Province of South Australia to elect six new members to increase the size of the Council from 18 to 24 members. The transition arrangements were that at the expiration of three, six and nine years, the eight longest-serving members elected by the whole Province would retire, and each new district would elect two members to replace them; if any vacancy arose such as due to death or resignation, one district in rotation would elect the replacement. Members were elected for nine years, with two from each district to retire every three years. Quorum was set at nine members.

It was superseded by the Constitution Act Amendment Act 1901, when Australia became a federation of states, which reduced the size of the legislative council from 24 back to 18 members.

== Legislative Council districts ==
The new districts were Each Legislative Council district comprised several divisions, each derived from the Assembly districts

Legislative Council district	Assembly divisions
Central District	East Adelaide; West Adelaide; North Adelaide; West Torrens; Sturt; Port Adelaide
Southern District	Onkaparinga; Noarlunga; Mount Barker; Encounter Bay; Albert; Victoria; East Torrens
North-Eastern District	Yatala; Gumeracha; Barossa; Wooroora; Light; Burra
Northern District	Wallaroo; Stanley; Flinders
