= Joseph Botterill =

Joseph Botterill (ca.1862 – 17 August 1920) was a politician in the State of South Australia. He was a Liberal Union member of the South Australian Legislative Council from 1915 to 1920, representing the Southern District.

== History ==
Joseph was a son of Joseph Botterill Sr., who had a general store at Apsley, Victoria.

In 1899 he took over management of Mingbool station in the South-East of South Australia, followed by Moorak, which he managed for Col. Browne. He then purchased Clifton Estate and Barnoolut Estate. In 1918 he purchased "The Caves", the old Umpherston property at Mount Gambier, where he died.

== Politics ==
In 1915 he was elected unopposed to the South Australian Legislative Council for the Southern district. He died in office in August 1920, having already announced his planned retirement on account of his intention to move to Victoria.

== Other interests ==
He was a member of the Mount Gambier Agricultural and Horticultural Society and for a time its president, and was president of the Liberal Union.
