= Central District (South Australian Legislative Council) =

Former South Australian state electoral district

Coordinates: 34°56′S 138°36′E

Central District was an electoral district for the Legislative Council of South Australia from 1882 until 1912. Prior to the passing of the Constitution Act Further Amendment Act 1881, the Legislative Council had been 18 members elected by people from across the entire Province.

At its creation in 1882, the Central District consisted of six electoral districts for the South Australian House of Assembly - East Adelaide, West Adelaide, North Adelaide, West Torrens, Sturt, Port Adelaide. It covered the area of the City of Adelaide and the surrounding areas on the south, west and northwest.

== Members ==
When created, the district was to elect six members to the Legislative Council which had been increased to 24 members, six from each of four districts. Transitional arrangements meant that members were only to be elected from the new districts as the terms of the existing members expired. From 1891, all members of the council were elected by districts.

The Constitution Act Amendment Act 1901 reduced the size of the parliament, but Central District was the only one to continue to elect six members, from a slightly larger area including some of the Adelaide Hills. The Constitution Act Further Amendment Act 1913 (No. 1148) increased the size of the council (among other changes), by dividing the Central District into Central District No. 1 and Central District No. 2, each of which elected four members.

Date of change	Member	Member	member	Member	Member	Member
28 February 1884	William Knox Simms (ret 1891)					
15 May 1885	William Knox Simms (ret 1891)	John Crozier	Henry Scott			
25 June 1887	William Knox Simms (ret 1891)	John Howard Angas	Henry Scott	Alfred Muller Simpson		
5 May 1888	William Knox Simms (ret 1891)	John Howard Angas	Henry Scott	Alfred Muller Simpson	George Witherage Cotton	Sylvanus James Magarey
23 May 1891	Robert Storrie Guthrie (reelected 1897, 1902)	John Howard Angas	David Morley Charleston (United Labor Party)	Alfred Muller Simpson	George Witherage Cotton	Sylvanus James Magarey
15 April 1893	Robert Storrie Guthrie (reelected 1897, 1902)	John Howard Angas	David Morley Charleston (United Labor Party)	Alfred Muller Simpson	William Alfred Robinson	Sylvanus James Magarey
19 May 1894	Robert Storrie Guthrie (reelected 1897, 1902)	Henry Robert Fuller	David Morley Charleston (United Labor Party)	Henry Adams	William Alfred Robinson	Sylvanus James Magarey
22 May 1897	Robert Storrie Guthrie (reelected 1897, 1902)	Henry Robert Fuller	David Morley Charleston (United Labor Party)	Henry Adams	William Alfred Robinson	Samuel Tomkinson
11 September 1897	Robert Storrie Guthrie (reelected 1897, 1902)	Henry Robert Fuller	David Morley Charleston (independent)	Henry Adams	William Alfred Robinson	Samuel Tomkinson
19 May 1900	Robert Storrie Guthrie (reelected 1897, 1902)	Andrew Alexander Kirkpatrick (re-elected 1902, 1905)	David Morley Charleston (independent)	Henry Adams	Joseph Vardon (re-elected 1902)	Samuel Tomkinson
22 September 1900	Robert Storrie Guthrie (reelected 1897, 1902)	Andrew Alexander Kirkpatrick (re-elected 1902, 1905)	David Morley Charleston (independent)	Henry Adams	Joseph Vardon (re-elected 1902)	Charles Cameron Kingston
9 February 1901	Robert Storrie Guthrie (reelected 1897, 1902)	Andrew Alexander Kirkpatrick (re-elected 1902, 1905)	David Morley Charleston (independent)	Henry Adams	Joseph Vardon (re-elected 1902)	John Langdon Parsons
1 June 1901	Robert Storrie Guthrie (reelected 1897, 1902)	Andrew Alexander Kirkpatrick (re-elected 1902, 1905)	George Brookman (re-elected 1902)	Henry Adams	Joseph Vardon (re-elected 1902)	John Langdon Parsons
3 May 1902	Robert Storrie Guthrie (reelected 1897, 1902)	Andrew Alexander Kirkpatrick (re-elected 1902, 1905)	George Brookman (re-elected 1902)	Henry William Thompson (re-elected 1905)	Joseph Vardon (re-elected 1902)	John Langdon Parsons
19 September 1903	Robert Storrie Guthrie (reelected 1897, 1902)	Andrew Alexander Kirkpatrick (re-elected 1902, 1905)	George Brookman (re-elected 1902)	Henry William Thompson (re-elected 1905)	Joseph Vardon (re-elected 1902)	Hugo Carl Emil Muecke
19 December 1903	Beaumont Arnold Moulden (re-elected 1905)	Andrew Alexander Kirkpatrick (re-elected 1902, 1905)	George Brookman (re-elected 1902)	Henry William Thompson (re-elected 1905)	Joseph Vardon (re-elected 1902)	Hugo Carl Emil Muecke
27 May 1905	Beaumont Arnold Moulden (re-elected 1905)	Andrew Alexander Kirkpatrick (re-elected 1902, 1905)	George Brookman (re-elected 1902)	Henry William Thompson (re-elected 1905)	Joseph Vardon (re-elected 1902)	Hugo Carl Emil Muecke
20 October 1906	Beaumont Arnold Moulden (re-elected 1905)	Andrew Alexander Kirkpatrick (re-elected 1902, 1905)	George Brookman (re-elected 1902)	David Jelley	Joseph Vardon (re-elected 1902)	Hugo Carl Emil Muecke
3 November 1906	Beaumont Arnold Moulden (re-elected 1905)	Andrew Alexander Kirkpatrick (re-elected 1902, 1905)	George Brookman (re-elected 1902)	David Jelley	James Phillips Wilson (re-elected 1910)	Hugo Carl Emil Muecke
2 March 1907	Beaumont Arnold Moulden (re-elected 1905)	Andrew Alexander Kirkpatrick (re-elected 1902, 1905)	George Brookman (re-elected 1902)	Frederick Samuel Wallis (re-elected 1912)	James Phillips Wilson (re-elected 1910)	Hugo Carl Emil Muecke
15 May 1909	Beaumont Arnold Moulden (re-elected 1905)	Theodore Bruce	George Brookman (re-elected 1902)	Frederick Samuel Wallis (re-elected 1912)	James Phillips Wilson (re-elected 1910)	Hugo Carl Emil Muecke
2 April 1910	Beaumont Arnold Moulden (re-elected 1905)	Theodore Bruce	Ernest Leopold William Klauer	Frederick Samuel Wallis (re-elected 1912)	James Phillips Wilson (re-elected 1910)	Alfred William Styles
5 August 1911	Beaumont Arnold Moulden (re-elected 1905)	Charles Richard Morris	Ernest Leopold William Klauer	Frederick Samuel Wallis (re-elected 1912)	James Phillips Wilson (re-elected 1910)	Alfred William Styles
10 February 1912	John Howard Vaughan	James Jelley	Ernest Leopold William Klauer	Frederick Samuel Wallis (re-elected 1912)	James Phillips Wilson (re-elected 1910)	Alfred William Styles

Central district was divided into Central District No. 1 and Central District No. 2 by the Constitution Act Further Amendment Act 1913 (No. 1148), each of which would have four representatives. The act provided that the sitting members should decide amongst themselves which three represented each of the two new districts. Their decision was

- Central District No. 1 — Jelley, Vaughan, and Wilson
- Central District No. 2 — Klauer, Styles, Wallis
