= William Morgan (South Australian politician) =

Australian politician

The Honourable Sir William Morgan KCMG
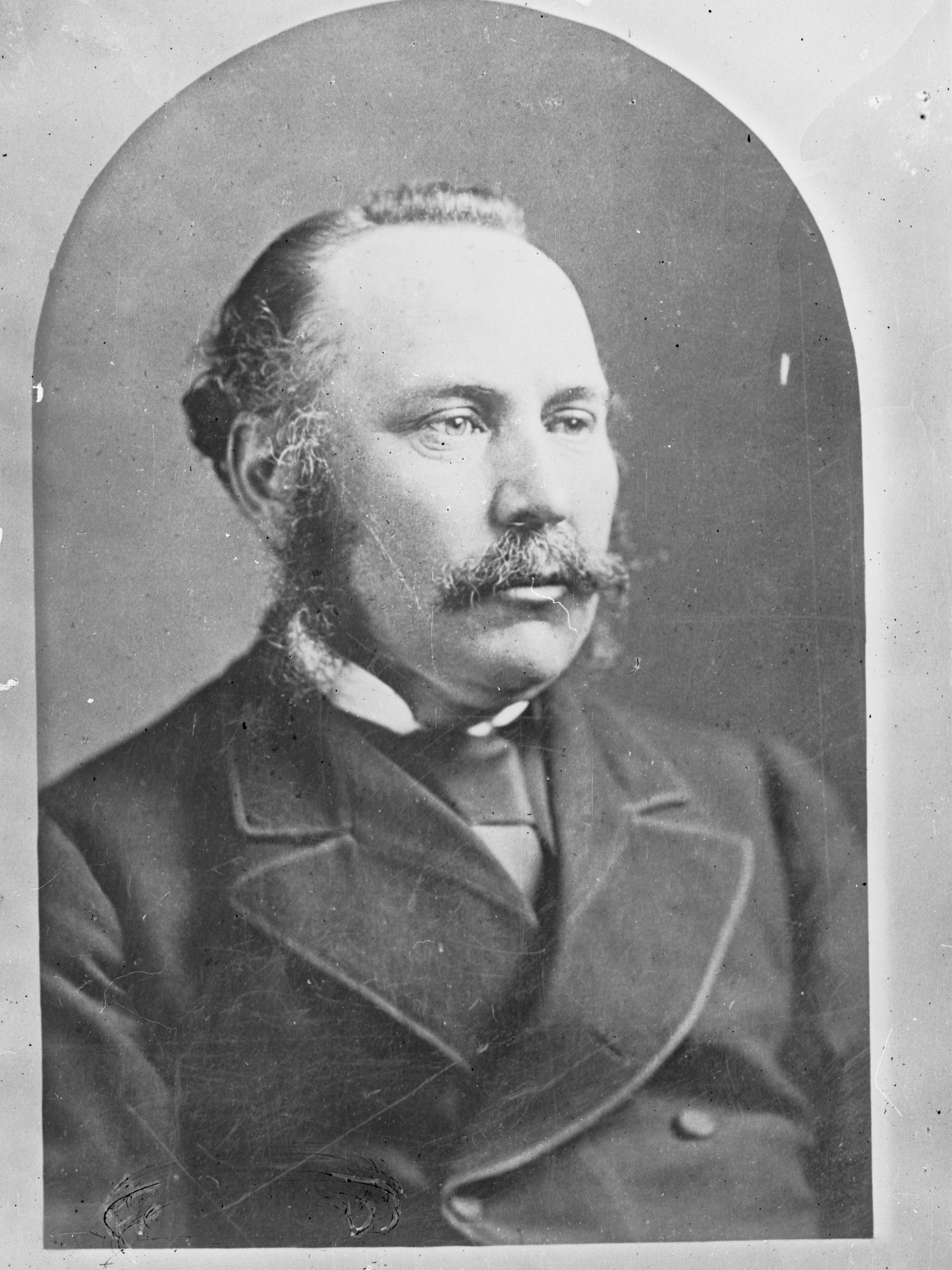

14th Premier of South Australia
- In office 27 September 1878 – 24 June 1881
- Monarch: Victoria
- Governor: Sir William Jervois
- Preceded by: James Boucaut
- Succeeded by: John Bray

Chief Secretary of South Australia
- In office 3 June 1875 – 25 March 1876
- Premier: James Boucaut
- Preceded by: Arthur Blyth
- Succeeded by: George Hawker
- In office 26 October 1877 – 24 June 1881
- Premier: James Boucaut (until 1878)
- Preceded by: Henry Ayers
- Succeeded by: John Bray

Personal details
- Born: 12 September 1828 Wilshamstead, Bedfordshire, United Kingdom
- Died: 2 November 1883 (aged 55) Brighton, Sussex, United Kingdom
- Spouse: Harriett Matthews

Sir William Morgan KCMG (12 September 1828 – 2 November 1883) was the Premier of South Australia between 1878 and 1881.

== Early life ==
William Morgan was born in Wilshamstead, Bedfordshire, England, the son of George Morgan, a farmer, and his wife Sarah Morgan (née Horne). Educated at Bedford Modern School, Morgan emigrated to South Australia, arriving in Port Adelaide on 13 February 1849 in the Glenelg. Initially he worked on land near the Murray River, his life was saved by an Indigenous Australian named Ranembe, whose name Morgan gave later to one of his sons. Then Morgan worked for Boord Brothers grocers; and at the beginning of 1852 he went to the Victorian gold rush. He had modest success, returned to Adelaide, and with a brother he purchased the Boord's business, establishing William Morgan & Co. and made it a successful enterprise. In 1865 he became a founder of the Bank of Adelaide. He founded, with Charles Hawkes Todd Connor and William Dening Glyde the firm of Morgan, Connor & Glyde, wheat and flour merchants of 43 King William Street. Glyde's brother Samuel Dening Glyde joined the company and soon became a partner. In 1882 they joined a consortium, the Adelaide Milling and Mercantile Company, with John Hart & Co., W. Duffield & Co., James Cowan & Co. and Harrold Brothers; Morgan was their foundation chairman.

== Political career ==
Morgan was elected to the South Australian Legislative Council in August 1867.

== Late life ==
Pressure of private business, including bad investments in New Caledonia, resulted in Morgan's resignation on 24 June 1881, and the John Bray ministry came in. He was created K.C.M.G. in 1883. In May that year Morgan left Australia on a visit to England and he died suddenly on 2 November at Brighton, Sussex, aged 55.

== Family ==
On 8 July 1854 Morgan married Harriett, daughter of Thomas Matthews of Hurd's Hill, Coromandel Valley; together they had nine children. Harriet survived him with two sons and two daughters, including:

- Dr. Alexander Matheson Morgan MB (11 February 1867 – 18 October 1934) was a noted ornithologist. He married Myrtle Dutton Green, daughter of George Dutton Green, on 11 October 1905.

- William Matheson Morgan (9 November 1906 – 2 February 1972) mining engineer

Parliament of South Australia
Preceded by Thomas Magarey	Member of the South Australian Legislative Council; 1867 – 1884; Served alongside: Multiple Members	Succeeded by William Simms
Political offices
Preceded by Arthur Blyth	Chief Secretary of South Australia; 1875 – 1876	Succeeded by George Hawker
Preceded by Henry Ayers	Chief Secretary of South Australia; 1877 – 1881	Succeeded by John Bray
Preceded by James Boucaut	Premier of South Australia; 1878 – 1881	Succeeded by John Bray
