= John Crozier (politician) =

Australian pastoralist, winemaker and politician (1814–1887)

John Crozier (12 August 1814 – 21 April 1887) was a pastoralist of New South Wales and Victoria and a South Australian politician.

== History ==
Crozier was born in Roxburgh, Scotland, and in 1838 emigrated in the Coromandel to New South Wales, where he had been appointed to manage the estate of Redesdale, in the Braidwood district, owned by Dr. Anderson, of Parramatta, and which was principally worked by assigned convicts. For three years he managed the Redesdale property, then from 1841 he managed the Sandhills station, not far from Bungendore and Lake George, in the Bathurst district for Captain Dobson, R.N. While there, he worked closely with John Henry Challis (died 29 February 1880), a member of the firm of Flower, Salting, & Co., who managed Captain Dobson's commercial interests in Sydney, and who bequeathed £100,000 to the Sydney University.

After five years at the Sandhills, he took up a station on the Edward River with partner George Rutherford; then moved to the Wentworth district, where they established Kulnine station. After some years of this pioneering work, Crozier became the sole proprietor of Kulnine, and eventually prospered sufficiently to acquire Moorna and other stations on the opposite side of the Murray. Eventually he sold Kulnine station and half the stock to Mr. Bagot, and as years went on he purchased runs in the north and on the Queensland and New South Wales borders, placing his sons in charge of these properties. In 1866 he moved to Adelaide, and in August that year purchased Oaklands estate, near Brighton, from Samuel R. Kearne (c. 1829–1921) and John H. Kearne (1830–1890), whose father Samuel Kearne (c. 1892–1857) had established the farm and 24-room residence. The estate included land which became the modern suburbs of Oaklands Park and Warradale.

In 1867 Crozier stood for a seat in the Legislative Council, which at that time was elected by the colony treated as one large constituency "The Province", one third falling vacant every four years. Three seats had become vacant through death or resignation, and Crozier was returned at the head of the poll, with (later Sir) William Morgan and Emanuel Solomon the other successful candidates. In 1877 six elected members were returned: William Morgan, John Crozier, Richard Chaffey Baker, Thomas English, James Pearce and Henry Kent Hughes. For the 1885 election the colony was divided into four districts for the Legislative Council, and Crozier and Henry Scott were returned for the Central district; Crozier died two years later.

He was also for many years chairman of the Brighton District Council, and took a considerable interest in the wine industry, and produced a large quantity while he was at Oaklands. He also took an interest in horse breeding, and imported some high-priced animals from Tasmania. He was in 1875 a founding steward of today's South Australian Jockey Club, along with Sir John Morphett, Sir Henry Ayers and others.

== Family ==
He married Jessie Taylor (1819 – 3 January 1877). Their children included:

- William Crozier (1839 – 22 June 1906) purchased Moorna station and Tilcha stations, and Kulnine from his brother John. He inherited the Oaklands estate from his father. He married Esther Murray (1848– ), a sister of sheep breeders Alick and John J. Murray. He was judged to be a lunatic by the South Australian Equity Court, and placed in confinement. His valuable estates were entrusted to the management of James Angus Johnston.
- John Crozier, jr. (1843 – 6 July 1916) was a noted racehorse breeder. He inherited Kulnine station from his father and sold it to his brother William. He then purchased St Albans Stud from James Wilson sen. and sold that establishment a few years later to mining magnate W. R. Wilson (no relation) at a substantial profit.
- Elizabeth Lilian Crozier (1845 – April 1936) married John Richardson (c. 1846 – 10 September 1917) on 7 December 1866. She moved to Perugia, Italy with her daughters, Mrs Percy Frost and Mrs T. F. Wigley. She died in London.
- Walter Taylor "Wattie" Crozier (c. 1848 – 6 June 1931) married Elizabeth Ann Hancock; owned a third share of Bimbowrie station with brothers Arthur and Edwin. He appears to have lived and died unheralded. His wife made claims on her father-in-law's estate together with Elizabeth Richardson; perhaps indicating she and Walter were separated.
- Thomas (1850 – c. 25 August 1878) died of heart attack at Cuthero on the River Darling
- Elliot Crozier (1852? 1854? – 10 November 1941) (Note: Not to be confused with Elliott John Crozier (c. 1828–1912) of Mildura, who married Elizabeth Martyn (1847–1894) c. 1862 and had 12 or 13 children.) lived at "Kongal", Bordertown, married "Lottie" Trew (1868 – 28 April 1938) on 7 December 1887. They had one daughter.
- Arthur Crozier (11 November 1856 – 13 September 1929), pastoralist, married his cousin Annie Margaret Crozier (c. 1867 – 20 July 1938) (Note: Annie was the second daughter of Elliott John Crozier (c. 1828 – 11 October 1912) of Cowra station, later of New Harwood, Mildura, and Elizabeth Jessie Crozier, née Martyn (1847–1894).) c. 20 November 1889; their children included Gordon, Lindsay, Keith, Kenneth, Malcolm, Neil, Marjorie (Mrs Ron Cameron) and Jean. He inherited Kulnine station from his father and purchased Moorara and Cuthero stations from his brother-in-law Ben Chaffey. Kulnine was around 1920 compulsorily acquired by the Victorian government for soldier settlement.
- Edwin Crozier (c. 1859 – 21 November 1906) was born at Kulnine and educated at Frederick Caterer's Glenelg Grammar School. He married Ethel Trew on 21 February 1898. His father gave him, with brothers Arthur and Walter, Bimbowrie station, which was where he died in agony after accidentally setting fire to his clothing.
- George Taylor Crozier (1861 – 27 August 1929) was a noted horseman, sheep breeder and sporting shooter. He married Amie Maud Southee of Balranald and died at Kirkee Private Hospital in Mildura.

== Sources ==
- Dolling, Alison The History of Marion on the Sturt, Peacock Publications, Frewville, South Australia. ISBN 0 909209 48 0 pp. 35–40.
