= William Alfred Robinson (Australian politician) =

Australian trade unionist and politician (1852–1927)

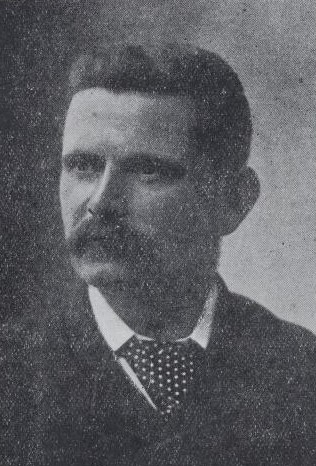

William Alfred Robinson (1852 – 23 July 1927) was a trade unionist and politician in the State of South Australia.

== History ==
William Alfred Robinson was born in London, and emigrated to Victoria with his parents around 1863. He was apprenticed to the coachbuilding trade at the age of 16, and followed that occupation in Victoria and South Australia.

He was one of the earliest trade unionists in Australia, and was appointed as a delegate to the Trades Union Congress in Tasmania in 1886 and 1889. He held the position of President of the Trades and Labour Council for five years and was secretary of the Locomotive Firemen, and Enginemen's Association for 22 years. The growth in membership of that organization during that time was largely attributable to his energy. He was a member of the Adelaide Hospital board, and assisted in the building up of the Railway Hospital Fund. He was appointed to the commission for the Adelaide Jubilee International Exhibition in 1887 and the Melbourne Centennial Exhibition in 1888.

He was elected for the Central District No.1 in the Legislative Council on 15 April 1893 and held it until 18 May 1900.

He died in Adelaide on 23 July (aged 75).
