= Southern District (South Australian Legislative Council) =

Former South Australian Legislative Council district

Coordinates: 35°05′53″S 138°31′39″E

Southern District was an electoral district for the Legislative Council of South Australia from 1882 until 1975. Prior to the passing of the Constitution Act Further Amendment Act 1881, the Legislative Council was 18 members elected by people from across the entire Province. From 1975, the Council returned to being elected from the entire state (the province had become a state of Australia in 1901).

At its creation in 1882, the Southern District consisted of seven electoral districts for the South Australian House of Assembly - Onkaparinga, Noarlunga, Mount Barker, Encounter Bay, Albert, Victoria and East Torrens. It covered the area of the Adelaide Hills, Fleurieu Peninsula and the south east of South Australia.

== Members ==
When created, the district was to elect six members to the Legislative Council which had been increased to 24 members, six from each of four districts. Transitional arrangements meant that members were only to be elected from the new districts as the terms of the existing members expired. From 1891, all members of the Council were elected by districts. All Southern District seats were filled from the 1890 by-election.

The Constitution Act Amendment Act 1901 reduced the size of the parliament, and Southern District then elected four members from the area of new enlarged Assembly districts of Victoria and Albert, Alexandra and Murray which covered roughly the same area, but with variation in the Adelaide Hills.

| Date of change | Member | Member | Member | Member | Member | Member |
|---|---|---|---|---|---|---|
| 8 May 1885 | W. A. E. West-Erskine (resigned 1891) | Richard Chaffey Baker (re-elected 1891, retired 1897) | | | | |
| 7 July 1885 by-election | W. A. E. West-Erskine (resigned 1891) | Richard Chaffey Baker (re-elected 1891, retired 1897) | Samuel Tomkinson (retired 14 Apr 1904) | | | |
| 12 May 1888 | W. A. E. West-Erskine (resigned 1891) | Richard Chaffey Baker (re-elected 1891, retired 1897) | Samuel Tomkinson (retired 14 Apr 1904) | James Garden Ramsay (died, vacancy declared 5 June 1890) | John Hannah Gordon (Resigned 16 December 1892) | |
| 28 June 1890 by-election | W. A. E. West-Erskine (resigned 1891) | Richard Chaffey Baker (re-elected 1891, retired 1897) | Samuel Tomkinson (retired 14 Apr 1904) | James Garden Ramsay (died, vacancy declared 5 June 1890) | John Hannah Gordon (Resigned 16 December 1892) | Friedrich Eduard Heinrich Wulf Krichauff (retired 1894) |
| 23 May 1891 | W. A. E. West-Erskine (resigned 1891) | Richard Chaffey Baker (re-elected 1891, retired 1897) | Samuel Tomkinson (retired 14 Apr 1904) | Andrew Alexander Kirkpatrick | John Hannah Gordon (Resigned 16 December 1892) | Friedrich Eduard Heinrich Wulf Krichauff (retired 1894) |
| 11 July 1891 by-election | John Lancelot Stirling (re-elected 1900, vacated by Act 1902) | Richard Chaffey Baker (re-elected 1891, retired 1897) | Samuel Tomkinson (retired 14 Apr 1904) | Andrew Alexander Kirkpatrick | John Hannah Gordon (Resigned 16 December 1892) | Friedrich Eduard Heinrich Wulf Krichauff (retired 1894) |
| 15 April 1893 by-election | John Lancelot Stirling (re-elected 1900, vacated by Act 1902) | Richard Chaffey Baker (re-elected 1891, retired 1897) | Samuel Tomkinson (retired 14 Apr 1904) | Andrew Alexander Kirkpatrick | John Hannah Gordon (Filled the vacancy created by his own resignation? re-elected 1900, vacated by Act 1902) | Friedrich Eduard Heinrich Wulf Krichauff (retired 1894) |
| 19 May 1894 | John Lancelot Stirling (re-elected 1900, vacated by Act 1902) | Richard Chaffey Baker (re-elected 1891, retired 1897) | Gregor McGregor (seated in federal parliament 1901) | Andrew Alexander Kirkpatrick | John Hannah Gordon (Filled the vacancy created by his own resignation? re-elected 1900, vacated by Act 1902) | Sir Edwin Thomas Smith (vacated by Act, 1902) |
| 22 May 1897 | John Lancelot Stirling (re-elected 1900, vacated by Act 1902) | Alexander Wallace Sandford (vacated by Act 1902) | Gregor McGregor (seated in federal parliament 1901) | Sir Richard Chaffey Baker (seated in Federal parliament, 1901) | John Hannah Gordon (Filled the vacancy created by his own resignation? re-elected 1900, vacated by Act 1902) | Sir Edwin Thomas Smith (vacated by Act, 1902) |
| 19 May 1900 | John Lancelot Stirling (re-elected 1900, vacated by Act 1902) | Alexander Wallace Sandford (vacated by Act 1902) | Gregor McGregor (seated in federal parliament 1901) | Sir Richard Chaffey Baker (seated in Federal parliament, 1901) | John Hannah Gordon (Filled the vacancy created by his own resignation? re-elected 1900, vacated by Act 1902) | Sir Edwin Thomas Smith (vacated by Act, 1902) |
| 8 June 1901 by-election | John Lancelot Stirling (re-elected 1900, vacated by Act 1902) | Alexander Wallace Sandford (vacated by Act 1902) | Alfred von Doussa | George Riddoch | John Hannah Gordon (Filled the vacancy created by his own resignation? re-elected 1900, vacated by Act 1902) | Sir Edwin Thomas Smith (vacated by Act, 1902) |

From the 1902 double dissolution election, most districts only elected 4 members, for staggered terms twice as long as those of the lower house. Legislative Council elections are held at the same time as House of Assembly elections.

| Date of change | Member | Member | Member | Member |
|---|---|---|---|---|
| 3 May 1902 | John Hannah Gordon (resigned 1 December 1903) | Alfred von Doussa (Elected 1902, 1905, 1912) | George Riddoch (ret 28 Feb 1910) | Sir John Lancelot Stirling (re-elected 1910, 1918, 1924, 1930) |
| 14 December 1903 (uncontested by-election) | Louis von Doussa (ret 4 May 1905) | Alfred von Doussa (Elected 1902, 1905, 1912) | George Riddoch (ret 28 Feb 1910) | Sir John Lancelot Stirling (re-elected 1910, 1918, 1924, 1930) |
| 27 May 1905 | Sir John William Downer (re-elected 1912) | Alfred von Doussa (Elected 1902, 1905, 1912) | George Riddoch (ret 28 Feb 1910) | Sir John Lancelot Stirling (re-elected 1910, 1918, 1924, 1930) |
| 2 April 1910 | Sir John William Downer (re-elected 1912) | Alfred von Doussa (Elected 1902, 1905, 1912) | John Cowan (re-elected 1918, 1924, 1930, 1938) | Sir John Lancelot Stirling (re-elected 1910, 1918, 1924, 1930) |
| 10 February 1912 | Sir John William Downer (re-elected 1912) | Alfred von Doussa (Elected 1902, 1905, 1912) | John Cowan (re-elected 1918, 1924, 1930, 1938) | Sir John Lancelot Stirling (re-elected 1910, 1918, 1924, 1930) |
| 16 August 1915 by-election | Joseph Botterill | Alfred von Doussa (Elected 1902, 1905, 1912) | John Cowan (re-elected 1918, 1924, 1930, 1938) | Sir John Lancelot Stirling (re-elected 1910, 1918, 1924, 1930) |
| 6 April 1918 | Joseph Botterill | Alfred von Doussa (Elected 1902, 1905, 1912) | John Cowan (re-elected 1918, 1924, 1930, 1938) | Sir John Lancelot Stirling (re-elected 1910, 1918, 1924, 1930) |
| 9 October 1920 by-election | Thomas McCallum re-elected 1921, 1927, 1933 | Alfred von Doussa (Elected 1902, 1905, 1912) | John Cowan (re-elected 1918, 1924, 1930, 1938) | Sir John Lancelot Stirling (re-elected 1910, 1918, 1924, 1930) |
| 9 and 16 April 1921 | Thomas McCallum re-elected 1921, 1927, 1933 | Robert Thomson Melrose | John Cowan (re-elected 1918, 1924, 1930, 1938) | Sir John Lancelot Stirling (re-elected 1910, 1918, 1924, 1930) |
| 5 April 1924 | Thomas McCallum re-elected 1921, 1927, 1933 | Robert Thomson Melrose | John Cowan (re-elected 1918, 1924, 1930, 1938) | Sir John Lancelot Stirling (re-elected 1910, 1918, 1924, 1930) |
| 26 March 1927 | Thomas McCallum re-elected 1921, 1927, 1933 | Harry Dove Young (re-elected 1933) | John Cowan (re-elected 1918, 1924, 1930, 1938) | Sir John Lancelot Stirling (re-elected 1910, 1918, 1924, 1930) |
| 5 April 1930 | Thomas McCallum re-elected 1921, 1927, 1933 | Harry Dove Young (re-elected 1933) | John Cowan (re-elected 1918, 1924, 1930, 1938) | Sir John Lancelot Stirling (re-elected 1910, 1918, 1924, 1930) |
| 17 June 1932 by-election | Thomas McCallum re-elected 1921, 1927, 1933 | Harry Dove Young (re-elected 1933) | John Cowan (re-elected 1918, 1924, 1930, 1938) | Reuben Cranstoun Mowbray |
| 8 April 1933 | Thomas McCallum re-elected 1921, 1927, 1933 | Harry Dove Young (re-elected 1933) | John Cowan (re-elected 1918, 1924, 1930, 1938) | Reuben Cranstoun Mowbray |
| 19 March 1938 | Thomas McCallum re-elected 1921, 1927, 1933 | Harry Dove Young (re-elected 1933) | John Cowan (re-elected 1918, 1924, 1930, 1938) | Frank Andrew Halleday |
| 18 June 1938 by-election | Edward Daniel Alexander Bagot | Harry Dove Young (re-elected 1933) | John Cowan (re-elected 1918, 1924, 1930, 1938) | Frank Andrew Halleday |
| 29 March 1941 | Norman Brookman (re-elected 1947) | John Leonard Sandoe Bice (re-elected 1947, 1953) | John Cowan (re-elected 1918, 1924, 1930, 1938) | Frank Andrew Halleday |
| 29 April 1944 | Norman Brookman (re-elected 1947) | John Leonard Sandoe Bice (re-elected 1947, 1953) | Norman Lane Jude (re-elected 1950, 1956, 1962, 1968) | Leslie Harold Densley (re-elected 1950, 1956, 1962) |
| 8 March 1947 | Norman Brookman (re-elected 1947) | John Leonard Sandoe Bice (re-elected 1947, 1953) | Norman Lane Jude (re-elected 1950, 1956, 1962, 1968) | Leslie Harold Densley (re-elected 1950, 1956, 1962) |
| 26 May 1949 by-election | John Lancelot Cowan (re-elected 1953) | John Leonard Sandoe Bice (re-elected 1947, 1953) | Norman Lane Jude (re-elected 1950, 1956, 1962, 1968) | Leslie Harold Densley (re-elected 1950, 1956, 1962) |
| 4 March 1950 | John Lancelot Cowan (re-elected 1953) | John Leonard Sandoe Bice (re-elected 1947, 1953) | Norman Lane Jude (re-elected 1950, 1956, 1962, 1968) | Leslie Harold Densley (re-elected 1950, 1956, 1962) |
| 7 March 1953 | John Lancelot Cowan (re-elected 1953) | John Leonard Sandoe Bice (re-elected 1947, 1953) | Norman Lane Jude (re-elected 1950, 1956, 1962, 1968) | Leslie Harold Densley (re-elected 1950, 1956, 1962) |
| 3 March 1956 | John Lancelot Cowan (re-elected 1953) | John Leonard Sandoe Bice (re-elected 1947, 1953) | Norman Lane Jude (re-elected 1950, 1956, 1962, 1968) | Leslie Harold Densley (re-elected 1950, 1956, 1962) |
| 7 March 1959 | Geoffrey O'Halloran Giles | Allan Charles Hookings | Norman Lane Jude (re-elected 1950, 1956, 1962, 1968) | Leslie Harold Densley (re-elected 1950, 1956, 1962) |
| 3 March 1962 | Geoffrey O'Halloran Giles | Allan Charles Hookings | Norman Lane Jude (re-elected 1950, 1956, 1962, 1968) | Leslie Harold Densley (re-elected 1950, 1956, 1962) |
| 15 December 1962 by-election | Geoffrey O'Halloran Giles | Renfrey Curgenven DeGaris (re-elected 1965,1973) | Norman Lane Jude (re-elected 1950, 1956, 1962, 1968) | Leslie Harold Densley (re-elected 1950, 1956, 1962) |
| 19 June 1964 by-election | Henry Kenneth Kemp (re-elected 1965,1973) | Renfrey Curgenven DeGaris (re-elected 1965,1973) | Norman Lane Jude (re-elected 1950, 1956, 1962, 1968) | Leslie Harold Densley (re-elected 1950, 1956, 1962) |
| 6 March 1965 | Henry Kenneth Kemp (re-elected 1965,1973) | Renfrey Curgenven DeGaris (re-elected 1965,1973) | Norman Lane Jude (re-elected 1950, 1956, 1962, 1968) | Leslie Harold Densley (re-elected 1950, 1956, 1962) |
| 2 June 1967 by-election | Henry Kenneth Kemp (re-elected 1965,1973) | Renfrey Curgenven DeGaris (re-elected 1965,1973) | Norman Lane Jude (re-elected 1950, 1956, 1962, 1968) | Victor George Springett (re-elected 1968) |
| 2 March 1968 | Henry Kenneth Kemp (re-elected 1965,1973) | Renfrey Curgenven DeGaris (re-elected 1965,1973) | Norman Lane Jude (re-elected 1950, 1956, 1962, 1968) | Victor George Springett (re-elected 1968) |
| 3 July 1971 by-election | Henry Kenneth Kemp (re-elected 1965,1973) | Renfrey Curgenven DeGaris (re-elected 1965,1973) | Martin Bruce Cameron | Victor George Springett (re-elected 1968) |
| 10 March 1973 | Henry Kenneth Kemp (re-elected 1965,1973) | Renfrey Curgenven DeGaris (re-elected 1965,1973) | Martin Bruce Cameron | Victor George Springett (re-elected 1968) |
| 11 August 1973 by-election | John Charles Burdett | Renfrey Curgenven DeGaris (re-elected 1965,1973) | Martin Bruce Cameron | Victor George Springett (re-elected 1968) |
