= John Baker (Australian politician) =

Australian politician

Lieutenant Colonel John Baker
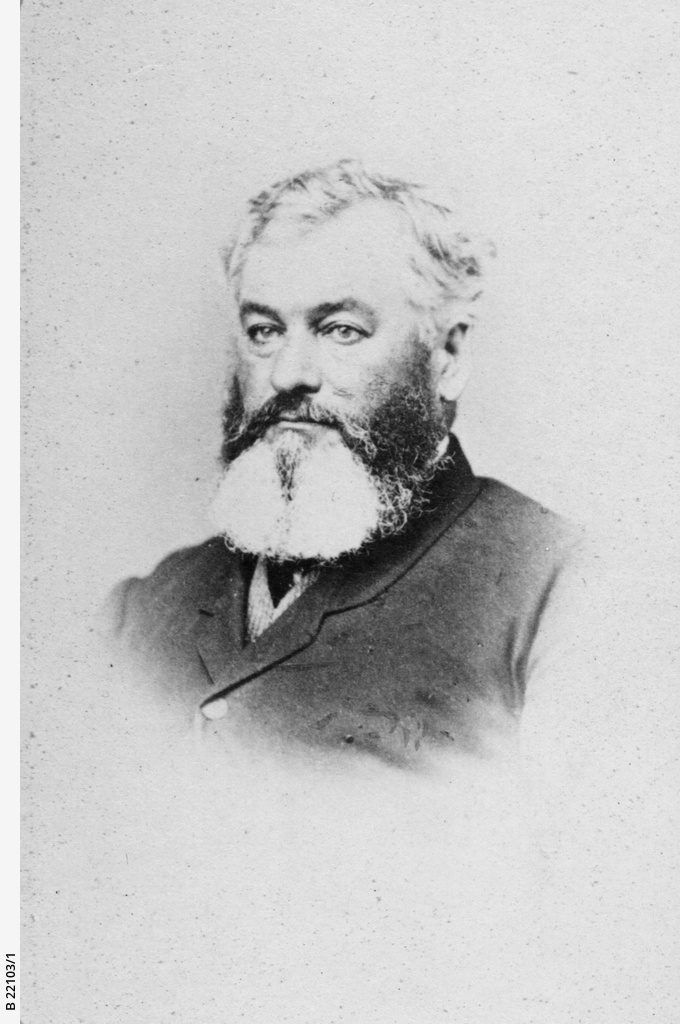
- John Baker, c. 1869

Premier of South Australia
- In office 21 August 1857 – 1 September 1857
- Monarch: Victoria
- Governor: Sir Richard MacDonnell
- Preceded by: B.T. Finniss
- Succeeded by: Robert Torrens

Member of the Legislative Council of South Australia
- In office 7 August 1863 – 18 May 1872
- In office 8 July 1851 – 27 March 1861
- Constituency: Mount Barker

Personal details
- Born: 28 December 1813 Ilminster, Somerset, England
- Died: 19 May 1872 (aged 58) Magill, South Australia
- Spouse: Isabella Allan (1838–1872)
- Children: 12

John Baker (28 December 1813 – 19 May 1872) was an early South Australian pastoralist and politician. He was the second Premier of the colony of South Australia, succeeding Boyle Travers Finniss; however, he only held office for 12 days from 21 August to 1 September 1857 before being succeeded by the third Premier of the colony, Robert Torrens.

== Early life ==
John Baker was born at Ilminster in Somerset, England, on 28 December 1813 to Richard Chaffey Baker and his wife Mary, née Anstice (c. 1885 – 24 August 1849). (Note: Baker's father died in Lopen, Somerset; his mother died at Baker's residence "Morialta") He emigrated to Van Diemen's Land in 1838, and married Isabella Allan on 7 June 1838.

== Pastoralist ==
In 1838 Baker visited the new settlement at Adelaide and in the following year returned and took up land in South Australia. In partnership with the South Australian Company he imported large numbers of sheep from Tasmania. By late 1840 he owned horses, cattle and four thousand sheep, and was a director of the Adelaide Auction Co., associated with Jacob Hagen in that and other business ventures. One of these was a whaling station at Encounter Bay that he operated between 1842 and 1846 in partnership with Hagan and John Hart.

He founded a racing stud based on Falklandina and Actaeon, the first thoroughbred mare and stallion brought into the colony. In 1850 he became a justice of the peace, a special magistrate and a director of the Savings Bank, and helped found and became first chairman of the South Australian Chamber of Commerce. Over the next decade he further developed his pastoral interests. In 1863 he bought "Terlinga", having previously sold many of his leases, and made it his head station. The severe drought of 1864-65 drastically reduced his stock, but a revaluation of his runs resulted in lower rents and he continued as a leading pastoralist. Other runs operated by Baker include "Mudlapina" and "Pernana", later known as "Angepina". In 1869 he bred a thoroughbred race horse named Don Juan, that would go on to win the 1873 Melbourne Cup.

== Political and public life ==
Baker was a member of the South Australian Legislative Council from 1851 to 1856, the first to be part elective, representing Mount Barker. When responsible government was established in 1857 he became a member of the new Legislative Council, winning the second largest vote. He served in the Council until 1861, and from 1863 until his death in 1872. He was Premier and chief secretary in the second South Australian ministry. While this lasted only 12 days, from 21 August to 1 September 1857, it ushered in an important agreement between the Council and the House of Assembly on the amendment of money bills.

Baker took part in the selection of the site of the Adelaide Botanic Gardens and was later a trustee. He was three times president of the Agricultural and Horticultural Society and a fellow of the Royal Geographical Society of London. In 1854 he helped form a volunteer company of mounted rifles, later becoming a lieutenant-colonel in the force, in which he served until it was disbanded in 1868. He also ran a racing stud.

He was for a time treasurer of Adelaide's Unitarian Christian Church, and on 23 December 1856 laid the foundation stone of the church building on Wakefield Street opposite St Francis Xavier's Cathedral.

== Family ==
John Baker (1813–1872) married Isabella Allan (24 July 1819 – 6 April 1908) on 7 June 1838 in Allanvale, Tasmania. She was a daughter of Isabella Allan (died 1871) and George Allan of "Allan Vale", Launceston, Tasmania, and later "Allan Vale", near Geelong, Victoria. Their family included:

- Richard Chaffey Baker (1841–1911) married Katherine Edith Colley (c. 1845 – 26 September 1908) in 1865, a double wedding.
- John Richard Baker (1866 – 23 December 1944) partner in legal firm Baker, McEwin, Ligertwood & Millhouse 1925–1945
- George Allan Baker (1844– )
- Mary Anstice Baker (1845– ) married Robert Dalrymple Ross ( – ) in 1865
- Isabella Morrison Baker (1847– )
- Elizabeth Anstice Baker (24 September 1849 – 16 October 1914), convert to Catholicism, intellectual and social activist
- Jessie Smythe Baker (1851– )
- John Baker (1853– )
- Mary Baker (1855– )
- Augustus Boyce Baker (1859–1868)
- Allan Selby Blake Baker (1862 – 13 February 1936) married Mary Irwin on 11 June 1888. He was Master of the Adelaide Hunt Club, died in British Columbia, where he had a cattle station near one of the Loon Lakes.

They had a home "Morialta", near Norton Summit, which served as Governor Sir William Jervois's summer residence while Marble Hill was being built. John Baker died at "Morialta"; Isabella died in London.

Mary Baker, who married Jacob Hagen, was a sister.

His brother James Baker and brother-in-law Aeneas Allan were managers of several of their pastoral properties.

== Notes ==
South Australian Legislative Council
Preceded by Thomas O'Halloran; William Scott; George Tinline	Member of the South Australian Legislative Council; 1851–1861; Served alongside: Multiple Members	Succeeded by John Barrow; William Peacock; Judah Solomon
Preceded by Thomas O'Halloran; Charles Sturt	Member of the South Australian Legislative Council; 1863–1872; Served alongside: Multiple Members	Succeeded by Walter Duffield; William Everard; Alexander Hay; Robert Tarlton
Political offices
Preceded by Boyle Finniss	Premier of South Australia; 1857	Succeeded by Robert Torrens
Preceded by Boyle Finniss	Chief Secretary of South Australia; 1857	Succeeded by Robert Torrens
