= David Charleston =

Australian politician (1848–1934)

The Honourable David Charleston
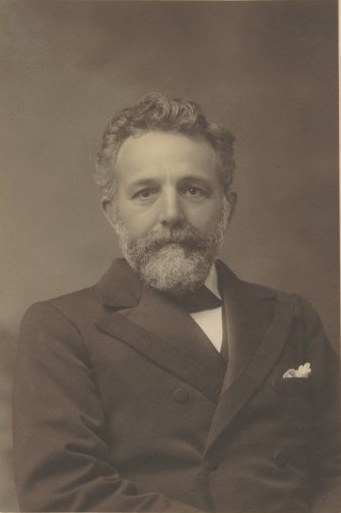

Senator for South Australia
- In office 30 March 1901 – 31 December 1903

Member of the South Australian Legislative Council for Central District
- In office 1891 – 1901

Personal details
- Born: 27 May 1848 St Erth, Cornwall, England
- Died: 30 June 1934 (aged 86) Mile End, South Australia
- Party: Labor (1891–97); Free Trade (1897–1903)
- Relations: Nellie Martel (sister)
- Occupation: Engineer

David Morley Charleston (27 May 1848 – 30 June 1934) was a Cornish-born Australian politician. Born in St Erth, Cornwall, he received only a primary education before becoming an apprentice engineer at Harvey & Co ironworks, and later an engineering unionist in the Amalgamated Society of Engineers in London. In 1874 he moved to San Francisco and worked as a marine engineer for Pacific Mail Steamship Company. Migrating to South Australia in 1884, he continued his engineering work initially on the Hackney Bridge for the Road Board then with the Adelaide Steamship Company, but resigned in 1887 after labour troubles. He subsequently became President of the United Trades and Labour Council of South Australia for a year from February 1889.

In 1891 he was elected to the South Australian Legislative Council as a Labor member, but he left the United Labor Party in 1897 and resigned his seat. He was re-elected as an independent at the resulting by-election. Leaving the Council in 1901, he was elected to the Australian Senate as a Free Trader. He was defeated in 1903, and was later General Secretary of the Farmers and Producers Political Union. Several attempts to re-enter the Senate were unsuccessful. Charleston died in 1934.

== Personal ==
Charleston married Mary Foster (née Cooke) on 24 December 1895. Mary was the daughter of William Cooke of the Britannia Iron Works, Melbourne, and a well-known singer and widow of Fanny Simonsen's pianist Charles Bunbury Foster, who may have died in Queensland in 1894, but details are elusive.

Charleston's sister was the suffragist Nellie Martel.

== See also ==
- Hundred of Charleston
