= Northern District (South Australian Legislative Council) =

Former South Australian Legislative Council district

Coordinates: 33°11′9″S 138°1′1″E

Northern District was an electoral district for the Legislative Council of South Australia from 1882 until 1975. Prior to the passing of the Constitution Act Further Amendment Act 1881, the Legislative Council was 18 members elected by people from across the entire Province. From 1975, the Council returned to being elected from the entire state (the province had become a state of Australia in 1901).

At its creation in 1882, the Northern District consisted of three electoral districts for the South Australian House of Assembly - Wallaroo, Stanley and Flinders. It covered the area of Eyre Peninsula, Yorke Peninsula, Flinders Ranges, the upper Mid North and any settlers in areas further north.

== Members ==
When created, the district was to elect six members to the Legislative Council which had been increased to 24 members, six from each of four districts. Transitional arrangements meant that members were only to be elected from the new districts as the terms of the existing members expired. From 1891, all members were elected by districts.

The Constitution Act Amendment Act 1901 reduced the size of the parliament, and Northern District then elected four members from the new enlarged Assembly districts of Stanley, Burra Burra, Flinders, and the Northern Territory. This added the Northern Territory and the lower Mid North to the Northern District.

Date of change	Member	Member	Member	Member	Member	Member
15 May 1885	Allan Campbell (Elected 1885, 1891; died 30 October 1898)	William Wadham (resigned 31 May 1888)				
6 July 1887 by-election	Allan Campbell (Elected 1885, 1891; died 30 October 1898)	William Wadham (resigned 31 May 1888)	William Copley (retired 14 April 1894)			
19 May 1888	Allan Campbell (Elected 1885, 1891; died 30 October 1898)	William Wadham (resigned 31 May 1888)	William Copley (retired 14 April 1894)	John Darling Sr. (retired 14 April 1897)	James O'Loghlin (Elected 1888, 1894; vacated 1902)	
11 July 1888 by-election	Allan Campbell (Elected 1885, 1891; died 30 October 1898)	Arthur Richman Addison (Elected 1888, 1897; vacated 1902)	William Copley (retired 14 April 1894)	John Darling Sr. (retired 14 April 1897)	James O'Loghlin (Elected 1888, 1894; vacated 1902)	
23 May 1891	Allan Campbell (Elected 1885, 1891; died 30 October 1898)	Arthur Richman Addison (Elected 1888, 1897; vacated 1902)	William Copley (retired 14 April 1894)	John Darling Sr. (retired 14 April 1897)	James O'Loghlin (Elected 1888, 1894; vacated 1902)	Ebenezer Ward (retired 14 April 1900)
1894 South Australian Legislative Council election	Allan Campbell (Elected 1885, 1891; died 30 October 1898)	Arthur Richman Addison (Elected 1888, 1897; vacated 1902)	John George Bice (Elected 1894, 1900, vacated 1902)	John Darling Sr. (retired 14 April 1897)	James O'Loghlin (Elected 1888, 1894; vacated 1902)	Ebenezer Ward (retired 14 April 1900)
22 May 1897	Allan Campbell (Elected 1885, 1891; died 30 October 1898)	Arthur Richman Addison (Elected 1888, 1897; vacated 1902)	John George Bice (Elected 1894, 1900, vacated 1902)	James Henderson Howe (vacated 1902)	James O'Loghlin (Elected 1888, 1894; vacated 1902)	Ebenezer Ward (retired 14 April 1900)
26 November 1898 by-election	Andrew Tennant (vacated 1902)	Arthur Richman Addison (Elected 1888, 1897; vacated 1902)	John George Bice (Elected 1894, 1900, vacated 1902)	James Henderson Howe (vacated 1902)	James O'Loghlin (Elected 1888, 1894; vacated 1902)	Ebenezer Ward (retired 14 April 1900)
1900 South Australian Legislative Council election	Andrew Tennant (vacated 1902)	Arthur Richman Addison (Elected 1888, 1897; vacated 1902)	John George Bice (Elected 1894, 1900, vacated 1902)	James Henderson Howe (vacated 1902)	James O'Loghlin (Elected 1888, 1894; vacated 1902)	Kossuth William Duncan (vacated 1902)

From this double dissolution election, each district only elected 4 members, for two terms of the lower house, Legislative Council elections are held at the same time as House of Assembly elections.

Date of change	Member	Member	Member	Member
1902 election	John Lewis (Elected 1902, 1905, 1912, 1921; died 25 August 1923)	John George Bice (Elected 1902, 1905, 1912, 1921; died 9 November 1923)	Arthur Richman Addison (Elected 1902, 1910; died 29 July 1915)	James Henderson Howe (Elected 1902, 1910; retired 28 February 1918)
1905 election	John Lewis (Elected 1902, 1905, 1912, 1921; died 25 August 1923)	John George Bice (Elected 1902, 1905, 1912, 1921; died 9 November 1923)	Arthur Richman Addison (Elected 1902, 1910; died 29 July 1915)	James Henderson Howe (Elected 1902, 1910; retired 28 February 1918)
1910 election	John Lewis (Elected 1902, 1905, 1912, 1921; died 25 August 1923)	John George Bice (Elected 1902, 1905, 1912, 1921; died 9 November 1923)	Arthur Richman Addison (Elected 1902, 1910; died 29 July 1915)	James Henderson Howe (Elected 1902, 1910; retired 28 February 1918)
1912 election	John Lewis (Elected 1902, 1905, 1912, 1921; died 25 August 1923)	John George Bice (Elected 1902, 1905, 1912, 1921; died 9 November 1923)	Arthur Richman Addison (Elected 1902, 1910; died 29 July 1915)	James Henderson Howe (Elected 1902, 1910; retired 28 February 1918)
1915 election does not appear to have been an LC election	John Lewis (Elected 1902, 1905, 1912, 1921; died 25 August 1923)	John George Bice (Elected 1902, 1905, 1912, 1921; died 9 November 1923)	Arthur Richman Addison (Elected 1902, 1910; died 29 July 1915)	James Henderson Howe (Elected 1902, 1910; retired 28 February 1918)
16 August 1915 by-election	John Lewis (Elected 1902, 1905, 1912, 1921; died 25 August 1923)	John George Bice (Elected 1902, 1905, 1912, 1921; died 9 November 1923)	William Morrow (Elected 1915, 1918, 1924, 1930; died 3 July 1934)	James Henderson Howe (Elected 1902, 1910; retired 28 February 1918)
6 April 1918	John Lewis (Elected 1902, 1905, 1912, 1921; died 25 August 1923)	John George Bice (Elected 1902, 1905, 1912, 1921; died 9 November 1923)	William Morrow (Elected 1915, 1918, 1924, 1930; died 3 July 1934)	William George James Mills (Elected 1918, 1924, 1927; retired 28 February 1933)
1921 election	John Lewis (Elected 1902, 1905, 1912, 1921; died 25 August 1923)	John George Bice (Elected 1902, 1905, 1912, 1921; died 9 November 1923)	William Morrow (Elected 1915, 1918, 1924, 1930; died 3 July 1934)	William George James Mills (Elected 1918, 1924, 1927; retired 28 February 1933)
1924 election	George Ritchie (Elected 1924, 1930, 1938; retired 29 February 1944)	Albert Percy Blesing (Elected 1924, 1927, 1933, 1941, 1947; died 2 March 1949)	William Morrow (Elected 1915, 1918, 1924, 1930; died 3 July 1934)	William George James Mills (Elected 1918, 1924, 1927; retired 28 February 1933)
1927 election	George Ritchie (Elected 1924, 1930, 1938; retired 29 February 1944)	Albert Percy Blesing (Elected 1924, 1927, 1933, 1941, 1947; died 2 March 1949)	William Morrow (Elected 1915, 1918, 1924, 1930; died 3 July 1934)	William George James Mills (Elected 1918, 1924, 1927; retired 28 February 1933)
1930 election	George Ritchie (Elected 1924, 1930, 1938; retired 29 February 1944)	Albert Percy Blesing (Elected 1924, 1927, 1933, 1941, 1947; died 2 March 1949)	William Morrow (Elected 1915, 1918, 1924, 1930; died 3 July 1934)	William George James Mills (Elected 1918, 1924, 1927; retired 28 February 1933)
1933 election	George Ritchie (Elected 1924, 1930, 1938; retired 29 February 1944)	Albert Percy Blesing (Elected 1924, 1927, 1933, 1941, 1947; died 2 March 1949)	William Morrow (Elected 1915, 1918, 1924, 1930; died 3 July 1934)	Hartley Gladstone Hawkins (died 9 July 1939)
20 October 1934 by-election	George Ritchie (Elected 1924, 1930, 1938; retired 29 February 1944)	Albert Percy Blesing (Elected 1924, 1927, 1933, 1941, 1947; died 2 March 1949)	Alexander Lyell McEwin (Elected 1934, 1938, 1944, 1950, 1956, 1962, 1968; retired 1975)	Hartley Gladstone Hawkins (died 9 July 1939)
1938	George Ritchie (Elected 1924, 1930, 1938; retired 29 February 1944)	Albert Percy Blesing (Elected 1924, 1927, 1933, 1941, 1947; died 2 March 1949)	Alexander Lyell McEwin (Elected 1934, 1938, 1944, 1950, 1956, 1962, 1968; retired 1975)	Hartley Gladstone Hawkins (died 9 July 1939)
2 September 1939 by-election	George Ritchie (Elected 1924, 1930, 1938; retired 29 February 1944)	Albert Percy Blesing (Elected 1924, 1927, 1933, 1941, 1947; died 2 March 1949)	Alexander Lyell McEwin (Elected 1934, 1938, 1944, 1950, 1956, 1962, 1968; retired 1975)	James Beerworth (Elected 1939, 1941; retired 28 February 1947)
1941	George Ritchie (Elected 1924, 1930, 1938; retired 29 February 1944)	Albert Percy Blesing (Elected 1924, 1927, 1933, 1941, 1947; died 2 March 1949)	Alexander Lyell McEwin (Elected 1934, 1938, 1944, 1950, 1956, 1962, 1968; retired 1975)	James Beerworth (Elected 1939, 1941; retired 28 February 1947)
1944	Ernest Harry Edmonds (Elected 1944, 1950, 1956, retired 1962)	Albert Percy Blesing (Elected 1924, 1927, 1933, 1941, 1947; died 2 March 1949)	Alexander Lyell McEwin (Elected 1934, 1938, 1944, 1950, 1956, 1962, 1968; retired 1975)	James Beerworth (Elected 1939, 1941; retired 28 February 1947)
1947	Ernest Harry Edmonds (Elected 1944, 1950, 1956, retired 1962)	Albert Percy Blesing (Elected 1924, 1927, 1933, 1941, 1947; died 2 March 1949)	Alexander Lyell McEwin (Elected 1934, 1938, 1944, 1950, 1956, 1962, 1968; retired 1975)	William Walsh Robinson (Elected 1947, 1953, 1959, retired 1965)
14 May 1949 by-election	Ernest Harry Edmonds (Elected 1944, 1950, 1956, retired 1962)	Robert Richard Wilson (Elected 1949, 1953, 1959, retired 1965)	Alexander Lyell McEwin (Elected 1934, 1938, 1944, 1950, 1956, 1962, 1968; retired 1975)	William Walsh Robinson (Elected 1947, 1953, 1959, retired 1965)
1950	Ernest Harry Edmonds (Elected 1944, 1950, 1956, retired 1962)	Robert Richard Wilson (Elected 1949, 1953, 1959, retired 1965)	Alexander Lyell McEwin (Elected 1934, 1938, 1944, 1950, 1956, 1962, 1968; retired 1975)	William Walsh Robinson (Elected 1947, 1953, 1959, retired 1965)
1953	Ernest Harry Edmonds (Elected 1944, 1950, 1956, retired 1962)	Robert Richard Wilson (Elected 1949, 1953, 1959, retired 1965)	Alexander Lyell McEwin (Elected 1934, 1938, 1944, 1950, 1956, 1962, 1968; retired 1975)	William Walsh Robinson (Elected 1947, 1953, 1959, retired 1965)
1956	Ernest Harry Edmonds (Elected 1944, 1950, 1956, retired 1962)	Robert Richard Wilson (Elected 1949, 1953, 1959, retired 1965)	Alexander Lyell McEwin (Elected 1934, 1938, 1944, 1950, 1956, 1962, 1968; retired 1975)	William Walsh Robinson (Elected 1947, 1953, 1959, retired 1965)
1959	Ernest Harry Edmonds (Elected 1944, 1950, 1956, retired 1962)	Robert Richard Wilson (Elected 1949, 1953, 1959, retired 1965)	Alexander Lyell McEwin (Elected 1934, 1938, 1944, 1950, 1956, 1962, 1968; retired 1975)	William Walsh Robinson (Elected 1947, 1953, 1959, retired 1965)
1962	Gordon James Gilfillan (Elected 1962, 1968, retired 1975)	Robert Richard Wilson (Elected 1949, 1953, 1959, retired 1965)	Alexander Lyell McEwin (Elected 1934, 1938, 1944, 1950, 1956, 1962, 1968; retired 1975)	William Walsh Robinson (Elected 1947, 1953, 1959, retired 1965)
1965	Gordon James Gilfillan (Elected 1962, 1968, retired 1975)	Charles Caleb Dudley Octoman (died 11 September 1966)	Alexander Lyell McEwin (Elected 1934, 1938, 1944, 1950, 1956, 1962, 1968; retired 1975)	Richard Alexander Geddes (Elected 1965, 1973, retired 1979)
29 October 1966 by-election	Gordon James Gilfillan (Elected 1962, 1968, retired 1975)	Arthur Mornington Whyte (Elected 1966, 1973, 1979, resigned 19 November 1985)	Alexander Lyell McEwin (Elected 1934, 1938, 1944, 1950, 1956, 1962, 1968; retired 1975)	Richard Alexander Geddes (Elected 1965, 1973, retired 1979)
1968	Gordon James Gilfillan (Elected 1962, 1968, retired 1975)	Arthur Mornington Whyte (Elected 1966, 1973, 1979, resigned 19 November 1985)	Alexander Lyell McEwin (Elected 1934, 1938, 1944, 1950, 1956, 1962, 1968; retired 1975)	Richard Alexander Geddes (Elected 1965, 1973, retired 1979)
1973	Gordon James Gilfillan (Elected 1962, 1968, retired 1975)	Arthur Mornington Whyte (Elected 1966, 1973, 1979, resigned 19 November 1985)	Alexander Lyell McEwin (Elected 1934, 1938, 1944, 1950, 1956, 1962, 1968; retired 1975)	Richard Alexander Geddes (Elected 1965, 1973, retired 1979)
