= Robert Guthrie (politician) =

Australian politician

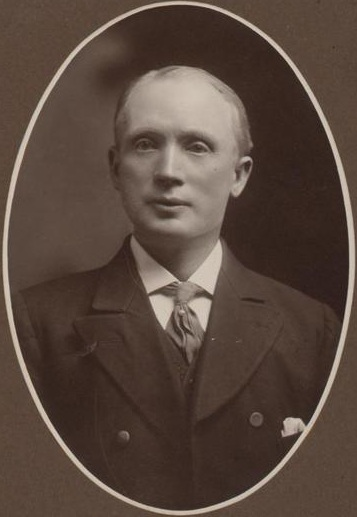

Senator for South Australia
- In office 1 January 1904 – 20 January 1921
- Succeeded by: Edward Vardon

Personal details
- Born: 17 November 1857 Partick, Scotland, United Kingdom
- Died: 20 January 1921 (aged 63) Melbourne, Victoria, Australia
- Party: Labor (1904–17); Nationalist (1917–21)
- Occupation: Seaman, unionist

Robert Storrie Guthrie (17 November 1857 – 20 January 1921) was a Scottish-born Australian politician. He was educated at Glasgow before becoming a seaman and migrating to Australia in 1887. He was South Australian Secretary and Federal President of the Seamen's Union before entering the South Australian Legislative Council as a Labor member in 1891. In 1903, he left the council to contest the Australian Senate, in which he was successful. Originally an Australian Labor Party Senator, he left the party in the wake of the 1916 split over conscription, joining the Nationalist Party.

On 19 January 1921, Guthrie was struck by a tram as he crossed the road at the corner of Collins and Swanston Streets in Melbourne. He was taken to the Royal Melbourne Hospital, where he died the next day from head injuries. Nationalist Edward Vardon was appointed to replace him.
