= North-Eastern District (South Australian Legislative Council) =

Former South Australian Legislative Council electoral district

Coordinates: 34°32′S 138°57′E

North-Eastern District was an electoral district for the Legislative Council of South Australia from 1882 until 1912. It was then renamed to Midland District and continued until 1975 when the separate districts were abolished and the state elects members to the Legislative Council as a single district since that time.

At its creation, the North-Eastern District elected six of the 24 members of the Legislative Council. Following the 1902 reduction in the size of the parliament, it elected 4 of 18 (20 after 1915) members. Its initial extent was the House of Assembly districts of Yatala, Gumeracha, Barossa, Wooroora, Light and Burra.

The Midland district included the Assembly districts of Barossa, Wooroora and Wallaroo thus including Yorke Peninsula (which had been in the Northern District) but giving up the Burra area.

== Members ==
The members who represented the North-Eastern and Midlands districts were:

Date of change	Member	Member	member	Member	Member	Member
8 May 1885	Henry Edward Bright	James Martin (re-elected 1894)				
28 June 1886	Henry Edward Bright	James Martin (re-elected 1894)	John Bosworth			
19 May 1888	Henry Edward Bright	James Martin (re-elected 1894)	John Bosworth	John Warren (re-elected 1897)	Henry Ayers	
23 May 1891	William Haslam (re-elected 1897)	James Martin (re-elected 1894)	John Bosworth	John Warren (re-elected 1897)	Henry Ayers	John James Duncan (resigned 18 Dec 1896)
19 May 1894	William Haslam (re-elected 1897)	James Martin (re-elected 1894)	William Russell	John Warren (re-elected 1897)	Martin Peter Friedrich Basedow	John James Duncan (resigned 18 Dec 1896)
6 March 1897	William Haslam (re-elected 1897)	James Martin (re-elected 1894)	William Russell	John Warren (re-elected 1897)	Martin Peter Friedrich Basedow	Charles Willcox
22 May 1897	William Haslam (re-elected 1897)	James Martin (re-elected 1894)	William Russell	John Warren (re-elected 1897)	Martin Peter Friedrich Basedow	Charles Willcox
4 June 1898	John Lewis	James Martin (re-elected 1894)	William Russell	John Warren (re-elected 1897)	Martin Peter Friedrich Basedow	Charles Willcox
31 March 1900	John Lewis	Jimmy Duncan	William Russell	John Warren (re-elected 1897)	Martin Peter Friedrich Basedow	Charles Willcox
19 May 1900	John Lewis	Jimmy Duncan	Thomas Pascoe	John Warren (re-elected 1897)	Edward Lucas	Charles Willcox

From the 1902 double dissolution election, each district only elected 4 members, for two terms of the lower house. Legislative Council elections are held at the same time as House of Assembly elections.

Date of change	Member	Member	member	Member
3 May 1902	John Warren (re-elected 1905)	Edward Lucas (re-elected 1905,1912)	Thomas Pascoe (re-elected 1910, 1918, 1921, 1927)	John James Duncan (re-elected 1910)
27 May 1905	John Warren (re-elected 1905)	Edward Lucas (re-elected 1905,1912)	Thomas Pascoe (re-elected 1910, 1918, 1921, 1927)	John James Duncan (re-elected 1910)
2 April 1910	John Warren (re-elected 1905)	Edward Lucas (re-elected 1905,1912)	Thomas Pascoe (re-elected 1910, 1918, 1921, 1927)	John James Duncan (re-elected 1910)
North-eastern renamed to Midland by Act 959 of 1908 from 1912	John Warren (re-elected 1905)	Edward Lucas (re-elected 1905,1912)	Thomas Pascoe (re-elected 1910, 1918, 1921, 1927)	John James Duncan (re-elected 1910)
10 February 1912	Walter Hannaford (re-elected 1921, 1927, 1933)	Edward Lucas (re-elected 1905,1912)	Thomas Pascoe (re-elected 1910, 1918, 1921, 1927)	John James Duncan (re-elected 1910)
15 November 1913	Walter Hannaford (re-elected 1921, 1927, 1933)	Edward Lucas (re-elected 1905,1912)	Thomas Pascoe (re-elected 1910, 1918, 1921, 1927)	David Gordon (re-elected 1918, 1924, 1930, 1938)
6 April 1918	Walter Hannaford (re-elected 1921, 1927, 1933)	Walter Gordon Duncan (re-elected 1924, 1930, 1938, 1944, 1950, 1956)	Thomas Pascoe (re-elected 1910, 1918, 1921, 1927)	David Gordon (re-elected 1918, 1924, 1930, 1938)
15 March 1921	Walter Hannaford (re-elected 1921, 1927, 1933)	Walter Gordon Duncan (re-elected 1924, 1930, 1938, 1944, 1950, 1956)	Thomas Pascoe (re-elected 1910, 1918, 1921, 1927)	David Gordon (re-elected 1918, 1924, 1930, 1938)
5 April 1924	Walter Hannaford (re-elected 1921, 1927, 1933)	Walter Gordon Duncan (re-elected 1924, 1930, 1938, 1944, 1950, 1956)	Thomas Pascoe (re-elected 1910, 1918, 1921, 1927)	David Gordon (re-elected 1918, 1924, 1930, 1938)
26 March 1927	Walter Hannaford (re-elected 1921, 1927, 1933)	Walter Gordon Duncan (re-elected 1924, 1930, 1938, 1944, 1950, 1956)	Thomas Pascoe (re-elected 1910, 1918, 1921, 1927)	David Gordon (re-elected 1918, 1924, 1930, 1938)
5 April 1930	Walter Hannaford (re-elected 1921, 1927, 1933)	Walter Gordon Duncan (re-elected 1924, 1930, 1938, 1944, 1950, 1956)	Thomas Pascoe (re-elected 1910, 1918, 1921, 1927)	David Gordon (re-elected 1918, 1924, 1930, 1938)
8 April 1933	Walter Hannaford (re-elected 1921, 1927, 1933)	Walter Gordon Duncan (re-elected 1924, 1930, 1938, 1944, 1950, 1956)	Ernest William Castine (re-elected 1941)	David Gordon (re-elected 1918, 1924, 1930, 1938)
19 March 1938	Walter Hannaford (re-elected 1921, 1927, 1933)	Walter Gordon Duncan (re-elected 1924, 1930, 1938, 1944, 1950, 1956)	Ernest William Castine (re-elected 1941)	David Gordon (re-elected 1918, 1924, 1930, 1938)
29 March 1941	Alexander John Melrose (re-elected 1947, 1953, 1959)	Walter Gordon Duncan (re-elected 1924, 1930, 1938, 1944, 1950, 1956)	Ernest William Castine (re-elected 1941)	David Gordon (re-elected 1918, 1924, 1930, 1938)
29 April 1944	Alexander John Melrose (re-elected 1947, 1953, 1959)	Walter Gordon Duncan (re-elected 1924, 1930, 1938, 1944, 1950, 1956)	Ernest William Castine (re-elected 1941)	Reginald John Rudall (re-elected 1950)
8 March 1947	Alexander John Melrose (re-elected 1947, 1953, 1959)	Walter Gordon Duncan (re-elected 1924, 1930, 1938, 1944, 1950, 1956)	Douglas Peel Gordon	Reginald John Rudall (re-elected 1950)
1 November 1948	Alexander John Melrose (re-elected 1947, 1953, 1959)	Walter Gordon Duncan (re-elected 1924, 1930, 1938, 1944, 1950, 1956)	Colin Rowe (re-elected 1953, 1959, 1965)	Reginald John Rudall (re-elected 1950)
4 March 1950	Alexander John Melrose (re-elected 1947, 1953, 1959)	Walter Gordon Duncan (re-elected 1924, 1930, 1938, 1944, 1950, 1956)	Colin Rowe (re-elected 1953, 1959, 1965)	Reginald John Rudall (re-elected 1950)
7 March 1953	Alexander John Melrose (re-elected 1947, 1953, 1959)	Walter Gordon Duncan (re-elected 1924, 1930, 1938, 1944, 1950, 1956)	Colin Rowe (re-elected 1953, 1959, 1965)	Reginald John Rudall (re-elected 1950)
26 February 1955	Alexander John Melrose (re-elected 1947, 1953, 1959)	Walter Gordon Duncan (re-elected 1924, 1930, 1938, 1944, 1950, 1956)	Colin Rowe (re-elected 1953, 1959, 1965)	Ross Story (re-elected 1956, 1962, 1968)
3 March 1956	Alexander John Melrose (re-elected 1947, 1953, 1959)	Walter Gordon Duncan (re-elected 1924, 1930, 1938, 1944, 1950, 1956)	Colin Rowe (re-elected 1953, 1959, 1965)	Ross Story (re-elected 1956, 1962, 1968)
17 February 1959	Alexander John Melrose (re-elected 1947, 1953, 1959)	Walter Gordon Duncan (re-elected 1924, 1930, 1938, 1944, 1950, 1956)	Colin Rowe (re-elected 1953, 1959, 1965)	Ross Story (re-elected 1956, 1962, 1968)
3 March 1962	Alexander John Melrose (re-elected 1947, 1953, 1959)	Maynard Boyd Dawkins (re-elected 1968)	Colin Rowe (re-elected 1953, 1959, 1965)	Ross Story (re-elected 1956, 1962, 1968)
20 October 1962	Leslie Rupert Hart (re-elected 1965)	Maynard Boyd Dawkins (re-elected 1968)	Colin Rowe (re-elected 1953, 1959, 1965)	Ross Story (re-elected 1956, 1962, 1968)
6 March 1965	Leslie Rupert Hart (re-elected 1965)	Maynard Boyd Dawkins (re-elected 1968)	Colin Rowe (re-elected 1953, 1959, 1965)	Ross Story (re-elected 1956, 1962, 1968)
2 March 1968	Leslie Rupert Hart (re-elected 1965)	Maynard Boyd Dawkins (re-elected 1968)	Colin Rowe (re-elected 1953, 1959, 1965)	Ross Story (re-elected 1956, 1962, 1968)
12 September 1970	Leslie Rupert Hart (re-elected 1965)	Maynard Boyd Dawkins (re-elected 1968)	Keith Russack	Ross Story (re-elected 1956, 1962, 1968)
10 March 1973	Brian Alfred Chatterton	Maynard Boyd Dawkins (re-elected 1968)	Cecil William Creedon	Ross Story (re-elected 1956, 1962, 1968)
