= Richard Chaffey Baker =

Australian politician (1842–1911)

The Honourable Sir Richard Chaffey Baker KCMG KC
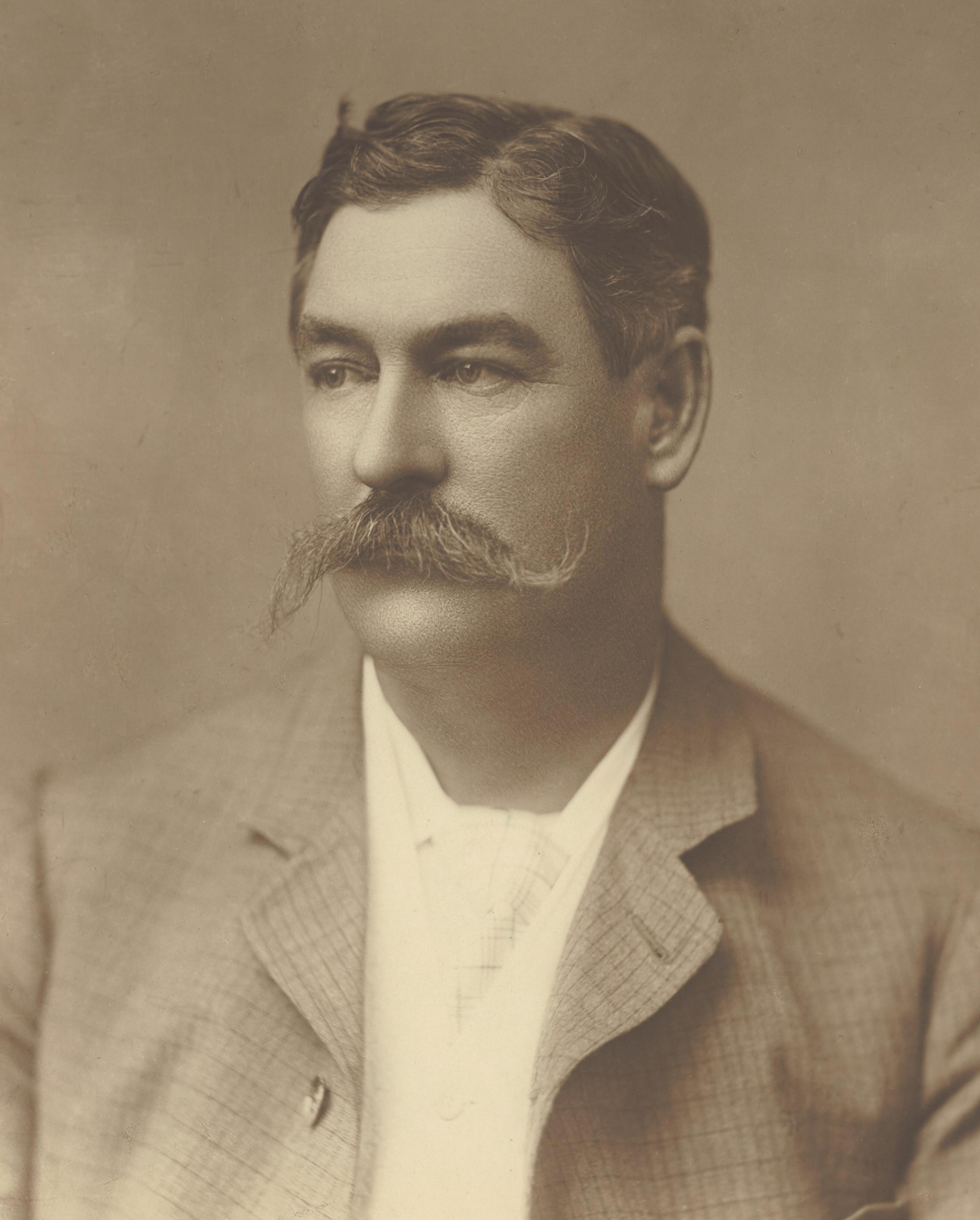

1st President of the Australian Senate
- In office 9 May 1901 – 31 December 1906
- Succeeded by: Albert Gould

Senator for South Australia
- In office 30 March 1901 – 31 December 1906

Personal details
- Born: 22 June 1842 North Adelaide, Colony of South Australia
- Died: 18 March 1911 (aged 68) Norton Summit, South Australia
- Party: National Defence League
- Spouse: Katherine Colley (m. 1865–1908)
- Relations: John Baker (father); Bessie Anstice Baker (sister)
- Education: Trinity College, Cambridge
- Occupation: Barrister

Sir Richard Chaffey Baker KCMG KC (22 June 1842 – 18 March 1911) was an Australian politician. A barrister by trade, he embarked on a successful career in South Australian colonial politics, serving as Attorney-General of South Australia from 1870 to 1871 and President of the South Australian Legislative Council from 1893 to 1901 before switching to federal politics after federation. He served as the inaugural President of the Australian Senate from 1901 to 1906. A noted federalist, he was the son of one-time Premier of South Australia John Baker.

== Early life ==
Baker was born on 22 June 1841 in North Adelaide, South Australia. He was the oldest son of twelve children – including younger sister Bessie – born to Isabella (née Allan) and John Baker, who had settled in South Australia in 1839 after marrying in Van Diemen's Land the previous year. His father was born in Somerset, England, and had a variety of business and agricultural interests. He was elected to the South Australian Legislative Council in 1851 and served briefly as premier in 1857.

Baker was sent to England to be educated, attending Eton College before going on to Trinity College, Cambridge, where he rowed for the Third Trinity Boat Club and graduated Bachelor of Arts in 1864. He was called to the bar at Lincoln's Inn in the same year and returned to Adelaide where he set up a practice with Charles Fenn. In 1873 he entered into a partnership with William Barlow. Baker's legal practice suffered as he devoted more time to politics, and his appointment as Queen's Counsel in 1900 was somewhat controversial.

== Colonial politics ==
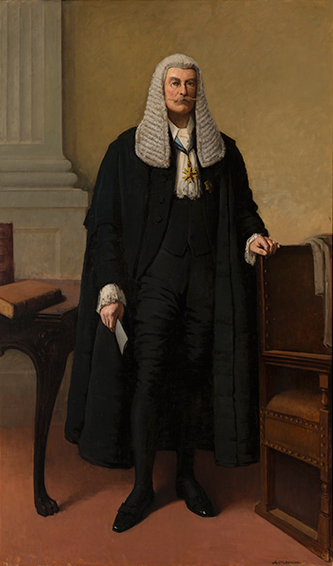
Parliament House portrait of Baker by Alexander Colquhoun, 1914

Baker began developing a successful career as a barrister, but in 1868, at the age of 26, decided to stand for the state lower house of parliament, the House of Assembly, in the seat of Barossa. The campaign was successful, as he topped the poll, and thus took one of the two Barossa seats in the House of Assembly.

Baker earned an M.A. in 1870, and was appointed as Attorney-General in the third ministry of John Hart in May 1870, but returned to the backbenches in July 1871 in order to manage the affairs of his ailing father, and did not recontest his seat at the election late that year. Two years later, Baker visited England, and on his return in early 1875, he declined an offer to serve in the cabinet of Sir Arthur Blyth. He nevertheless recontested his old seat of Barossa, but was defeated. Two years later, Baker chose to instead contest a seat in the Legislative Council, and was successful. He held his seat until federation, serving a twelve-month stint as education minister in the Colton ministry in 1884–1885, and serving as President of the Legislative Council from 1893 until 1901. He founded the National Defence League in 1891 as an immediate response to the perceived threat from the Labor Party.

=== Federation movement ===
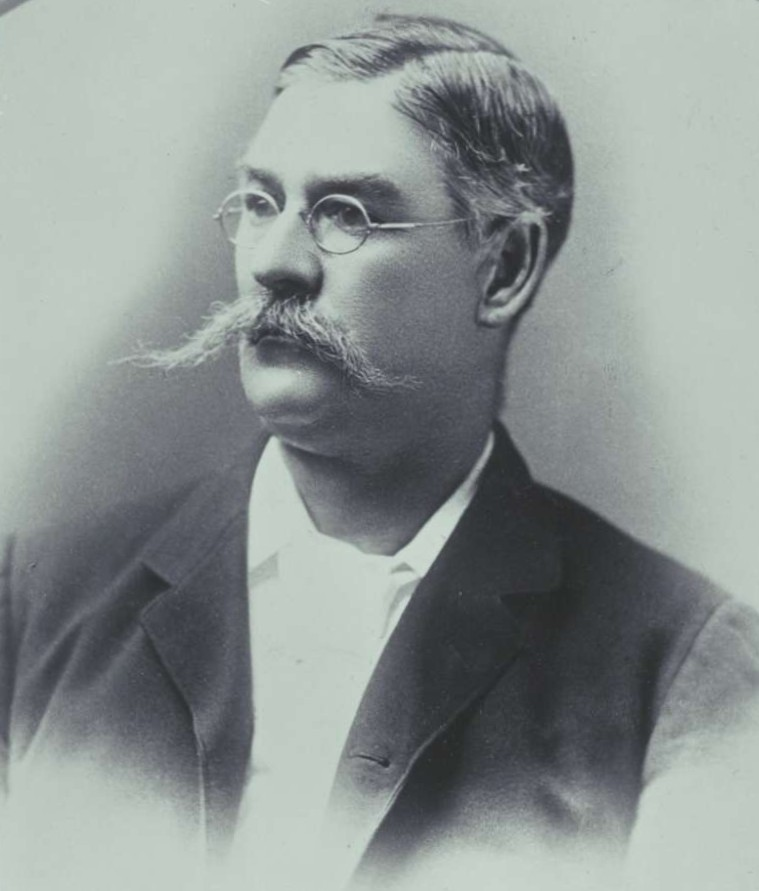
Baker, chairman of the 1897–98 Australasian Federal Convention.

Baker has been identified as one of the first to characterise the Australian federation as a crowned republic, although he did not use that term. In 1891, he argued for the adoption of a "republican system" when Australia federated, and cited pre-existing federal republics as a model for the new constitution. However, he supported the Queen as head of state and argued against the direct election of the governor-general. According to McKenna (1997), Baker "proudly proclaimed his loyalty to the Queen in the same breath as he declared himself a republican", with his conception of republican government based not on "absence of monarchy, but in the rule of law, the separation of powers, balanced government, and the sovereignty of the people".

== Federal politics ==
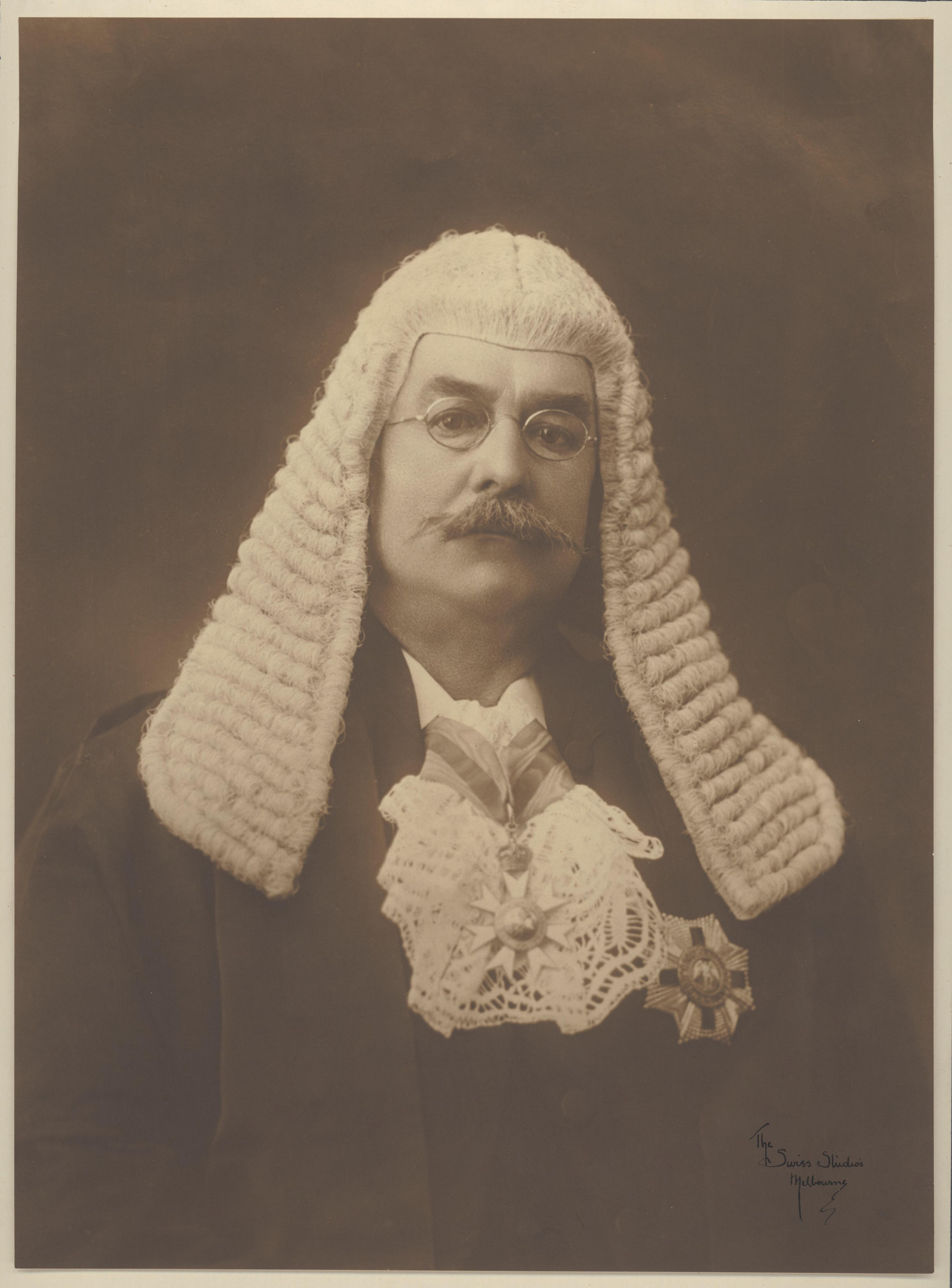
Baker as President of the Senate

Baker was elected to the Senate at the inaugural 1901 federal election. On 9 May 1901 he was elected as the inaugural President of the Senate, winning 21 votes out of 36 on the first ballot. His first major role was as chairman of the standing orders committee, which soon resolved to adopt the standing orders of the South Australian House of Assembly as an interim measure. The Senate continued to use the interim standing orders until September 1903. As president, Baker's major achievement was to establish "a procedural framework for the Senate, which allowed for flexibility and helped to ensure that the Senate's independence was maintained". He argued that its procedures should be wholly independent rather than modelled on the House of Representatives or the British House of Commons, initiating the publication of "president's rulings" as a source of precedent for his successors.

As per section 23 of the constitution, Baker exercised a full deliberative vote as president, although he "refused to take sides in the debates between free traders and protectionists". He occasionally made speeches on political matters, such as speaking against proportional representation during the debate on the Commonwealth Electoral Act 1902. He stated that it was difficult to reconcile the independence of the president with the political responsibilities of an ordinary senator. In 1903, Baker represented Australia at the Delhi Durbar where King Edward VII was crowned Emperor of India. He was re-elected as president in March 1904, following the 1903 election, and "was widely respected for his fairness, decision and ability". He retired from the Senate at the expiry of his term on 31 December 1906, citing ill health.

== Personal life ==
On 23 December 1865 he married Katherine Edith Colley (c. 1845–1908), who predeceased him, and was survived by two sons (J. R. Baker LLD and R. C. Baker) and a daughter (Miss Edith Baker). Katherine was a daughter of R. B. Colley, first mayor of Glenelg.

He was for many years chairman of the jockey club at Morphettville. He had large pastoral interests and was involved in the development of copper mining in the state. He was created a Companion of the Order of St Michael and St George (CMG) in 1886 and was knighted KCMG in 1895.

Parliament of Australia
New title	President of the Australian Senate; 1901–1906	Succeeded by Albert Gould
