= Electoral results for the district of Stanley (South Australia) =

South Australian district election results

This is a list of election results for the electoral district of Stanley in South Australian elections.

== Members for Stanley ==
Two members (1862–1902)
Member	Party	Term	Member	Party	Term
G. S. Kingston		1862–1880	George Young		1862–1865
G. S. Kingston		1862–1880	H. E. Bright		1865–1875
G. S. Kingston		1862–1880	Charles Mann		1875–1881
Alfred Catt		1881–1884	J. H. Howe		1881–1884
E. W. Hawker		1884–1889	John Miller		1884–1885
E. W. Hawker		1884–1889	John Darling Sr.		1885–1887
E. W. Hawker		1884–1889	Charles Kimber		1887–1890
P. P. Gillen		1889–1896	Charles Kimber		1887–1890
P. P. Gillen		1889–1896	John Miller		1890–1893
P. P. Gillen		1889–1896	E. W. Hawker	Defence League	1893–1896
W. P. Cummins		1896–1902	John Miller		1896–1902

Three members (1902–1915)
Member	Party	Term	Member	Party	Term	Member	Party	Term
W. P. Cummins	National League	1902–1906	Alfred Catt		1902–1904	F. W. Young	National League	1902–1905
W. P. Cummins	National League	1902–1906	Alfred Catt	Farmers and Producers	1904–1906	Clarence Goode	Labor	1905–1915
W. P. Cummins	Liberal and Democratic	1906–1907	Harry Jackson	Labor	1906–1915	Clarence Goode	Labor	1905–1915
K. W. Duncan	Farmers and Producers	1907–1910	Harry Jackson	Labor	1906–1915	Clarence Goode	Labor	1905–1915
William Cole	Labor	1910–1915	Harry Jackson	Labor	1906–1915	Clarence Goode	Labor	1905–1915

Two members (1915–1938)
Member	Party	Term	Member	Party	Term
Robert Nicholls	Liberal Union	1915–1923	Henry Barwell	Liberal Union	1915–1923
Robert Nicholls	Liberal Federation	1923–1932	Henry Barwell	Liberal Federation	1923–1925
Robert Nicholls	Liberal Federation	1923–1932	John Lyons	Liberal Federation	1925–1932
Robert Nicholls	Liberal and Country	1932–1938	John Lyons	Liberal and Country	1932–1938

Single-member (1938–1956)
Member	Party	Term
Alexander Melrose	Liberal and Country	1938–1941
Percy Quirke	Labor	1941–1948
Percy Quirke	Independent	1948–1956

== Election results ==
=== Elections in the 1950s ===
1953 South Australian state election: Stanley
Party	Candidate	Votes	%	±%
Independent	Percy Quirke	2,954	61.9	+14.7
Liberal and Country	Elliot Parker	1,817	38.1	+2.6
Total formal votes		4,771	98.0	−0.8
Informal votes		98	2.0	+0.8
Turnout		4,869	96.8	−0.1
Independent hold		Swing	+1.9	

1950 South Australian state election: Stanley
Party	Candidate	Votes	%	±%
Independent	Percy Quirke	2,335	47.2	+47.2
Liberal and Country	Alexander Knappstein	1,755	35.5	−14.4
Labor	Cyril Hasse	856	17.3	−32.8
Total formal votes		4,946	98.8	−0.1
Informal votes		60	1.2	+0.1
Turnout		5,006	96.9	+1.4
Two-candidate-preferred result
Independent	Percy Quirke	2,970	60.0	
Liberal and Country	Alexander Knappstein	1,976	40.0	
Independent gain from Labor		Swing	N/A	

=== Elections in the 1940s ===
1947 South Australian state election: Stanley
Party	Candidate	Votes	%	±%
Labor	Percy Quirke	2,444	50.1	−7.6
Liberal and Country	Gordon Bails	1,512	31.0	−11.3
Liberal and Country	Douglas Hannaford	923	18.9	+18.9
Total formal votes		4,879	98.9	+0.6
Informal votes		55	1.1	−0.6
Turnout		4,934	95.5	+4.1
Labor hold		Swing	N/A	

- Preferences were not distributed.

1944 South Australian state election: Stanley
Party	Candidate	Votes	%	±%
Labor	Percy Quirke	2,645	57.7	+4.7
Liberal and Country	Gordon Bails	1,940	42.3	−4.7
Total formal votes		4,585	98.3	−0.2
Informal votes		81	1.7	+0.2
Turnout		4,666	91.4	+20.8
Labor hold		Swing	+4.7	

1941 South Australian state election: Stanley
Party	Candidate	Votes	%	±%
Labor	Percy Quirke	1,961	53.0	+53.0
Liberal and Country	Henry Bohnsack	1,741	47.0	+11.9
Total formal votes		3,702	98.5	−0.5
Informal votes		56	1.5	+0.5
Turnout		3,758	70.6	−5.2
Labor gain from Liberal and Country		Swing	N/A	

=== Elections in the 1930s ===
1938 South Australian state election: Stanley
Party	Candidate	Votes	%	±%
Liberal and Country	Alexander Melrose	1,441	35.1	
Independent	Percy Quirke	1,344	32.7	
Independent Liberal	Samuel Dennison	1,320	32.2	
Total formal votes		4,105	99.0	
Informal votes		41	1.0	
Turnout		4,146	75.8	
Two-candidate-preferred result
Liberal and Country	Alexander Melrose	2,272	55.3	
Independent	Percy Quirke	1,833	44.7	
Liberal and Country hold		Swing		
