= Electoral results for the district of Port Pirie =

South Australian district election results

This is a list of election results for the electoral district of Port Pirie in South Australian elections.

== Members for Port Pirie ==
Two members (1915–1938)
| Member | Party | Term | Member | Party | Term |
|---|---|---|---|---|---|
| William Cole | Labor | 1915–1917 | Harry Jackson | Labor | 1915–1917 |
| William Cole | National | 1917–1918 | Harry Jackson | National | 1917–1918 |
| Lionel Hill | Labor | 1918–1931 | John Fitzgerald | Labor | 1918–1936 |
| Lionel Hill | Parliamentary Labor | 1931–1933 | John Fitzgerald | Labor | 1918–1936 |
| Andrew Lacey | Labor | 1933–1938 | John Fitzgerald | Labor | 1918–1936 |
| Andrew Lacey | Labor | 1933–1938 | William Threadgold | Labor | 1937–1938 |

Single-member (1938–1970)
| Member | Party | Term |
|---|---|---|
| Andrew Lacey | Labor | 1938–1946 |
| Charles Davis | Labor | 1946–1959 |
| Dave McKee | Labor | 1959–1970 |

== Election results ==
=== Elections in the 1960s ===
1968 South Australian state election: Port Pirie
| Party | Candidate | Votes | % | ±% |
|---|---|---|---|---|
| Labor | Dave McKee | 4,301 | 69.1 | −20.3 |
| Liberal and Country | Graham Hancock | 1,378 | 22.1 | +22.1 |
| Independent | Wesley Thomas | 547 | 8.8 | +8.8 |
| Total formal votes | | 6,226 | 97.8 | +1.0 |
| Informal votes | | 141 | 2.2 | −1.0 |
| Turnout | | 6,367 | 95.5 | −0.7 |
Two-party-preferred result
| Labor | Dave McKee | 4,574 | 73.5 | −0.5 |
| Liberal and Country | Graham Hancock | 1,652 | 26.5 | +0.5 |
| Labor hold | | Swing | −0.5 | |

1965 South Australian state election: Port Pirie
| Party | Candidate | Votes | % | ±% |
|---|---|---|---|---|
| Labor | Dave McKee | 5,468 | 89.4 | −1.4 |
| Independent | Allan Mossop | 649 | 10.6 | +10.6 |
| Total formal votes | | 6,117 | 96.8 | −0.1 |
| Informal votes | | 204 | 3.2 | +0.1 |
| Turnout | | 6,321 | 96.2 | +1.4 |
| Labor hold | | Swing | −1.4 | |

1962 South Australian state election: Port Pirie
| Party | Candidate | Votes | % | ±% |
|---|---|---|---|---|
| Labor | Dave McKee | 5,513 | 90.8 | +31.7 |
| Independent | Ralph Rinaldi | 559 | 9.2 | +9.2 |
| Total formal votes | | 6,072 | 96.9 | −1.0 |
| Informal votes | | 195 | 3.1 | +1.0 |
| Turnout | | 6,267 | 94.8 | −0.7 |
| Labor hold | | Swing | N/A | |

=== Elections in the 1950s ===
1959 South Australian state election: Port Pirie
| Party | Candidate | Votes | % | ±% |
|---|---|---|---|---|
| Labor | Dave McKee | 3,757 | 59.1 | −40.9 |
| Independent | Henry Welch | 2,315 | 36.4 | +36.4 |
| Communist | Charles McCaffrey | 283 | 4.5 | +4.5 |
| Total formal votes | | 6,355 | 97.9 | |
| Informal votes | | 139 | 2.1 | |
| Turnout | | 6,494 | 95.5 | |
| Labor hold | | Swing | N/A | |

- Preferences were not distributed.

1956 South Australian state election: Port Pirie
| Party | Candidate | Votes | % | ±% |
|---|---|---|---|---|
| Labor | Charles Davis | unopposed | | |
| Labor hold | | Swing | | |

1953 South Australian state election: Port Pirie
| Party | Candidate | Votes | % | ±% |
|---|---|---|---|---|
| Labor | Charles Davis | 5,137 | 65.8 | −3.7 |
| Independent | Arthur Pickering | 1,585 | 20.3 | +20.3 |
| Independent | Thomas Madigan | 1,089 | 13.9 | +13.9 |
| Total formal votes | | 7,811 | 95.2 | +4.3 |
| Informal votes | | 390 | 4.8 | −4.3 |
| Turnout | | 8,201 | 96.2 | +1.2 |
| Labor hold | | Swing | N/A | |

- Preferences were not distributed.

1950 South Australian state election: Port Pirie
| Party | Candidate | Votes | % | ±% |
|---|---|---|---|---|
| Labor | Charles Davis | 4,965 | 69.5 | −30.5 |
| Independent | Charles Emery | 1,155 | 16.2 | +16.2 |
| Independent | Leslie Kyte | 1,027 | 14.4 | +14.4 |
| Total formal votes | | 7,147 | 90.9 | |
| Informal votes | | 714 | 9.1 | |
| Turnout | | 7,861 | 95.0 | |
| Labor hold | | Swing | N/A | |

- Preferences were not distributed.

=== Elections in the 1940s ===
1947 South Australian state election: Port Pirie
| Party | Candidate | Votes | % | ±% |
|---|---|---|---|---|
| Labor | Charles Davis | unopposed | | |
| Labor hold | | Swing | | |

1944 South Australian state election: Port Pirie
| Party | Candidate | Votes | % | ±% |
|---|---|---|---|---|
| Labor | Andrew Lacey | unopposed | | |
| Labor hold | | Swing | | |

1941 South Australian state election: Port Pirie
| Party | Candidate | Votes | % | ±% |
|---|---|---|---|---|
| Labor | Andrew Lacey | unopposed | | |
| Labor hold | | Swing | | |

=== Elections in the 1930s ===
1938 South Australian state election: Port Pirie
| Party | Candidate | Votes | % | ±% |
|---|---|---|---|---|
| Labor | Andrew Lacey | unopposed | | |
| Labor hold | | Swing | | |
