= Members of the South Australian Legislative Council, 1915–1918 =

This is a list of members of the South Australian Legislative Council from 1915 to 1918.

Name	District	Party	Term expiry	Time in office
Arthur Richman Addison ^{[1]}	Northern	Liberal	1918	1910–1915
John George Bice	Northern	Liberal	1921	1894–1923
Joseph Botterill ^{[2]}	Southern	Liberal	1921	1915–1920
John Carr	Central No. 1	Labor	1921	1915–1929
John Herbert Cooke	Central No. 2	Liberal	1921	1915–1933
John Cowan	Southern	Liberal	1918	1910–1944
Sir John Downer ^{[2]}	Southern	Liberal	1921	1905–1915
David Gordon	Midland	Liberal	1918	1913–1944
Walter Hannaford	Midland	Liberal	1921	1912–1941
William Humphrey Harvey ^{[3]}	Central No. 2	Labor/National ^{[5]}	1918	1915–1935
James Howe	Northern	Liberal	1918	1897–1918
James Jelley	Central No. 1	Labor	1921	1912–1933
Ern Klauer ^{[3]}	Central No. 2	Labor	1918	1910–1915
John Lewis	Northern	Liberal	1921	1898–1923
Edward Lucas ^{[7]}	Midland	Liberal	1921	1900–1918
William Morrow ^{[1]}	Northern	Liberal	1918	1915–1934
Thomas Pascoe	Midland	Liberal	1918	1900–1933
Sir Lancelot Stirling	Southern	Liberal	1918	1891–1932
Alfred William Styles	Central No. 2	Labor/National ^{[5]}	1918	1910–1918
John Vaughan	Central No. 1	Labor/National ^{[5]}	1918	1912–1918
Alfred von Doussa	Southern	Liberal	1921	1901–1921
Frederick Samuel Wallis	Central No. 2	Labor	1921	1907–1921
James Phillips Wilson	Central No. 1	Labor/Independent/National ^{[4]} ^{[5]}	1918	1906–1918

^{1} Liberal MLC Arthur Richman Addison died on 29 July 1915. William Morrow was elected unopposed to the vacancy on 16 August.
^{2} Liberal MLC Sir John Downer died on 2 August 1915. Joseph Botterill was elected unopposed to the vacancy on 16 August.
^{3} Labor MLC Ern Klauer died on 6 August 1915. William Humphrey Harvey was elected unopposed to the vacancy on 20 August.
^{4} James Phillips Wilson was expelled from the Labor Party in September 1915 over a dispute about his committee memberships. He sat thereafter as an independent, but would later join the National Party after the 1917 Labor split.
^{5} In the February 1917 Labor split, the official Labor Party expelled Premier Crawford Vaughan and his supporters, including three of their MLCs, William Humphrey Harvey, Alfred William Styles and John Vaughan, over their support for conscription in World War I. The expelled MPs formed the National Labor Party in March, and were joined by ex-Labor independent Wilson; the party was renamed the National Party in June.
^{6} The United Labor Party changed their name to the Labor Party in 1917.
^{7} Liberal MLC Edward Lucas resigned on 1 February 1918 upon his appointment as Agent-General for South Australia. A by-election was not held due to the proximity of the 1918 election, at which Lucas' seat, expiring in 1921, was filled concurrently with the other class of seats.
