= Members of the South Australian Legislative Council, 1912–1915 =

This is a list of members of the South Australian Legislative Council from 1912 to 1915

It was the fourth Legislative Council to be fully determined by provisions of the (State) Constitution Act 779 of 1901, which provided for, inter alia, a reduction in the number of seats from 24 to 18, realignment of District borders to encompass Assembly electorates, six-year terms (one half of the Council retiring every three years), and elections held jointly with the House of Assembly.

The North-Eastern district was renamed "Midland" from 1912

Name	District	Party	Time in office
Arthur Richman Addison	Northern	Liberal	1888–1915
John George Bice	Northern	Liberal	1894–1923
John Cowan	Southern	Liberal	1910–1944
Sir John Downer	Southern	Liberal	1905–1915
John Duncan ^{[1]}	Midland	Liberal	1891–1896, 1900–1913
David Gordon ^{[1]}	Midland	Liberal	1913–1944
Walter Hannaford	Midland	Liberal	1912–1941
James Howe	Northern	Liberal	1897–1918
James Jelley	Central	Labor	1912–1933
Ern Klauer	Central	Labor	1910–1915
John Lewis	Northern	Liberal	1898–1923
Edward Lucas	Midland	Liberal	1900–1918
Thomas Pascoe	Midland	Liberal	1900–1933
Sir Lancelot Stirling	Southern	Liberal	1891–1932
Alfred William Styles	Central	Labor	1910–1918
John Vaughan	Central	Labor	1912–1918
Alfred von Doussa	Southern	Liberal	1901–1921
Frederick Samuel Wallis	Central	Labor	1907–1921
James Phillips Wilson	Central	Labor	1906–1918

^{1} Liberal MLC John Duncan died on 8 October 1913. Liberal candidate David Gordon won the resulting by-election on 15 November.
