= Central District No. 2 (South Australian Legislative Council) =

Former South Australian Legislative Council district

Coordinates: 34°51′50″S 138°39′35″E

Central District No. 2 was an electoral district for the South Australian Legislative Council from 1913 until 1975. It was created by the Constitution Act Further Amendment Act 1913, which divided the Central District into two districts, each to elect four members. The size of the Legislative Council was to remain at 18 until the next general election, and increase to 20 by adding a new member for each of the two new districts. From its creation until the next general election (which was held on 27 March 1915), Central District No. 2 comprised the extant Assembly electoral district of Torrens. The act also redrew the Assembly electoral districts from the next election. From then, Central District No. 2 would comprise the new Assembly districts of Sturt and East Torrens.

== Members ==
The Constitution Act Further Amendment Act provided that the six sitting members for Central District should decide amongst themselves which three represented each of the two new districts. The three who initially represented Central District No. 2 were Ern Klauer, Alfred William Styles and Frederick Samuel Wallis.

Date of change	Member	Member	member	Member
At formation (three members)	Alfred William Styles	Ern Klauer	Frederick Samuel Wallis	
12 March 1915	Alfred William Styles	Ern Klauer	Frederick Samuel Wallis	John Herbert Cooke (re-elected 1921, 1927)
20 August 1915	Alfred William Styles	William Humphrey Harvey (re-elected 1918, 1924, 1930)	Frederick Samuel Wallis	John Herbert Cooke (re-elected 1921, 1927)
6 April 1918	Henry Tassie (re-elected 1924, 1930)	William Humphrey Harvey (re-elected 1918, 1924, 1930)	Frederick Samuel Wallis	John Herbert Cooke (re-elected 1921, 1927)
9 and 16 April 1921	Henry Tassie (re-elected 1924, 1930)	William Humphrey Harvey (re-elected 1918, 1924, 1930)	George Henry Prosser (re-elected 1927)	John Herbert Cooke (re-elected 1921, 1927)
5 April 1924	Henry Tassie (re-elected 1924, 1930)	William Humphrey Harvey (re-elected 1918, 1924, 1930)	George Henry Prosser (re-elected 1927)	John Herbert Cooke (re-elected 1921, 1927)
26 March 1927	Henry Tassie (re-elected 1924, 1930)	William Humphrey Harvey (re-elected 1918, 1924, 1930)	George Henry Prosser (re-elected 1927)	John Herbert Cooke (re-elected 1921, 1927)
5 April 1930	Henry Tassie (re-elected 1924, 1930)	William Humphrey Harvey (re-elected 1918, 1924, 1930)	George Henry Prosser (re-elected 1927)	John Herbert Cooke (re-elected 1921, 1927)
8 April 1933	Henry Tassie (re-elected 1924, 1930)	William Humphrey Harvey (re-elected 1918, 1924, 1930)	Collier Robert Cudmore (re-elected 1941, 1947, 1953)	Hermann Homburg
14 December 1935	Edward Holden (re-elected 1938, 1944)	William Humphrey Harvey (re-elected 1918, 1924, 1930)	Collier Robert Cudmore (re-elected 1941, 1947, 1953)	Hermann Homburg
19 March 1938	Edward Holden (re-elected 1938, 1944)	James Wallace Sandford (re-elected 1944, 1950)	Collier Robert Cudmore (re-elected 1941, 1947, 1953)	Hermann Homburg
29 March 1941	Edward Holden (re-elected 1938, 1944)	James Wallace Sandford (re-elected 1944, 1950)	Collier Robert Cudmore (re-elected 1941, 1947, 1953)	Ernest Anthoney (re-elected 1947, 1953)
29 April 1944	Edward Holden (re-elected 1938, 1944)	James Wallace Sandford (re-elected 1944, 1950)	Collier Robert Cudmore (re-elected 1941, 1947, 1953)	Ernest Anthoney (re-elected 1947, 1953)
8 March 1947	Frank Tennyson Perry (re-elected 1950, 1956, 1962)	James Wallace Sandford (re-elected 1944, 1950)	Collier Robert Cudmore (re-elected 1941, 1947, 1953)	Ernest Anthoney (re-elected 1947, 1953)
4 March 1950	Frank Tennyson Perry (re-elected 1950, 1956, 1962)	James Wallace Sandford (re-elected 1944, 1950)	Collier Robert Cudmore (re-elected 1941, 1947, 1953)	Ernest Anthoney (re-elected 1947, 1953)
7 March 1953	Frank Tennyson Perry (re-elected 1950, 1956, 1962)	James Wallace Sandford (re-elected 1944, 1950)	Collier Robert Cudmore (re-elected 1941, 1947, 1953)	Ernest Anthoney (re-elected 1947, 1953)
3 March 1956	Frank Tennyson Perry (re-elected 1950, 1956, 1962)	Arthur Campbell Rymill (re-elected 1962, 1968)	Collier Robert Cudmore (re-elected 1941, 1947, 1953)	Ernest Anthoney (re-elected 1947, 1953)
7 March 1959	Frank Tennyson Perry (re-elected 1950, 1956, 1962)	Arthur Campbell Rymill (re-elected 1962, 1968)	Jessie Mary Cooper (re-elected 1965, 1973)	Frank Jacques Potter (re-elected 1965, 1973)
3 March 1962	Frank Tennyson Perry (re-elected 1950, 1956, 1962)	Arthur Campbell Rymill (re-elected 1962, 1968)	Jessie Mary Cooper (re-elected 1965, 1973)	Frank Jacques Potter (re-elected 1965, 1973)
6 March 1965	Frank Tennyson Perry (re-elected 1950, 1956, 1962)	Arthur Campbell Rymill (re-elected 1962, 1968)	Jessie Mary Cooper (re-elected 1965, 1973)	Frank Jacques Potter (re-elected 1965, 1973)
4 December 1965	Murray Hill (re-elected 1968)	Arthur Campbell Rymill (re-elected 1962, 1968)	Jessie Mary Cooper (re-elected 1965, 1973)	Frank Jacques Potter (re-elected 1965, 1973)
2 March 1968	Murray Hill (re-elected 1968)	Arthur Campbell Rymill (re-elected 1962, 1968)	Jessie Mary Cooper (re-elected 1965, 1973)	Frank Jacques Potter (re-elected 1965, 1973)
10 March 1973	Murray Hill (re-elected 1968)	Arthur Campbell Rymill (re-elected 1962, 1968)	Jessie Mary Cooper (re-elected 1965, 1973)	Frank Jacques Potter (re-elected 1965, 1973)
