= Jack Fitzgerald (Australian politician) =

Australian politician (1864–1936)

Jack Fitzgerald MP
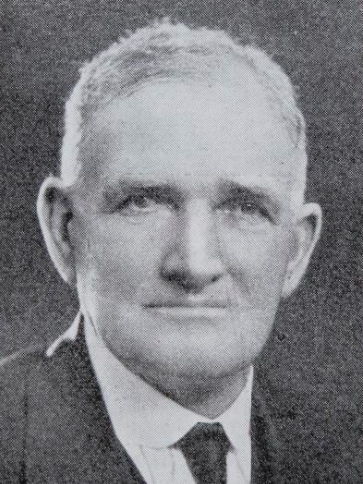
- 1936 portrait

Deputy Leader of the South Australian Labor Party
- In office 21 April 1933 – 22 June 1934
- Leader: Andrew Lacey
- Succeeded by: Robert Richards

Member of the South Australian Parliament for Port Pirie
- In office 6 April 1918 – 22 December 1936
- Preceded by: Harry Jackson
- Succeeded by: William Threadgold

Personal details
- Born: John Christopher Fitzgerald; 7 October 1864 Wallaroo, South Australia
- Died: 22 December 1936 (aged 72) Port Pirie
- Party: Labor

John Christopher Fitzgerald (7 October 1864 – 22 December 1936) was an Australian politician, who represented the Labor Party in the two-member state electoral district of Port Pirie in the South Australian House of Assembly between 1918 and his death in 1936. In his final term he was the deputy leader of the state Labor Party.

Born at Wallaroo on the Yorke Peninsula, his family moved to Port Pirie in the Mid North of South Australia when he was ten years old, and after completing his schooling, he worked as a labourer in various industries, then at the port. A short stint of prospecting at Broken Hill resulted in a significant windfall, after which Fitzgerald returned to Port Pirie and was active in the local community, particularly in sport. In 1901, Fitzgerald enlisted for service in the Second Boer War, and returned with the rank of quartermaster sergeant the following year. He returned to Port Pirie to work on the docks, and filled various leadership roles in the local labour movement, and in 1904 was elected to the town council. Unable to nominate the following year due to ill health, he continued to run unsuccessfully as a candidate in local elections, and was also an unsuccessful candidate for Labor Party preselection for the state electoral district of Stanley. In 1911, he took up farming at nearby Wirrabara.

An unsuccessful Labor candidate for Stanley in the 1915 state election, in 1918 Fitzgerald's persistence paid off when he was elected in the recently created two-member district of Port Pirie, a seat he largely held uncontested for the rest of his life. He did not join the Parliamentary Labor Party after it split from the ALP following the passing of the Premiers' Plan in 1931, but advocated for unity. He built on his state-level political success at the local level, being elected mayor of Port Pirie in 1922, 1923, 1925, 1926 and 1927, and following this with two terms as an alderman between 1932 and his death. Upon his death, tributes flowed from many in the Port Pirie community, and he was described by an opposition parliamentarian as "one of the really honourable men in public life".

== Early life and career ==
John Christopher Fitzgerald – known as Jack – was born at Wallaroo, South Australia, on 7 October 1864, and moved to Port Pirie with his family at age ten. He had three brothers and two sisters. His father Patrick owned two horses and worked as a linesman in Port Pirie. Jack's family brought two cows with them from Wallaroo, and Jack became the first milk vendor in Port Pirie. He inconsistently attended Mr. Inglis' private school until the Pirie School opened, after which he attended there. After leaving school, Jack worked with his father on the Port Broughton to Mundoora tram line. He worked helping his father on a contract ballasting between Port Pirie and Warnertown, and clearing farming blocks his father had bought near Beetaloo and Jamestown. The latter involved very hard labour clearing Mallee scrub. Jack then carted pipes to the Nelshaby Reservoir that fed Port Pirie's water supply. At fourteen years of age Fitzgerald began playing football for Port Pirie, a sporting pursuit he continued for many years, featuring as a "great ruckman" in the early 1890s. According to a 1936 interview with The Recorder newspaper in Port Pirie, Fitzgerald's first "real job" was working at Dunn's flour mill in Port Pirie. He was a powerfully built man, who once used one hand to lift two 56 lb (25 kg) weights above his head to win a wager.

While still in his youth, Fitzgerald went to Broken Hill, New South Wales, to prospect, and partnering with Duncan McCulloch, established the Britannia-Scotia mine there. In 1885, Fitzgerald transported the first load of horn silver ore from Broken Hill to Port Pirie, containing about 300 oz (8.5 kg) to the 1 long ton (1.0 t). The ore was shipped to Germany, and Fitzgerald and McCulloch split a cheque for £1,000 (British pounds) (about $230,000 Australian dollars in 2025).

Fitzgerald continued to work the mine for a time, but he was forced to close it due to rising water levels. He bought early shares in the Broken Hill Proprietary Company Limited with his proceeds, but sold out before the company's boom as his parents needed money. He returned to Port Pirie in 1886, where he married Margaret Hannan, his sister-in-law. Fitzgerald began farming in the district, and also worked at the lead smelters in Port Pirie for several years. He then began work at the Port Pirie wharves. The hours of work were long, with Fitzgerald later recalling that he once went to work on a Tuesday afternoon to discharge coal from ships at the wharves, and returned home on the following Saturday to sleep.

Fitzgerald's sporting interests extended beyond football to rowing and athletics. Along with the notable local all-round athlete and footballer Tom Hannan, who was also his wife's brother, Fitzgerald was a member of Port Pirie's championship coxed four crew, which won a £60 cash prize (about $13,500 Australian dollars in 2025) in a 3 mi (4.8 km) race at the Port Pirie Regatta in 1891. Fitzgerald coached Hannan, later recalling that he and Hannan would go for a three-mile run before rowing for the same distance, and Fitzgerald would often run the 4 mi (6.4 km) back to his home afterwards. He and Hannan would also juggle using 56 lb weights. As he had in his younger days, Fitzgerald got into the occasional fight, but claimed he would avoid them if possible.

== Second Boer War ==
On 16 January 1901, Fitzgerald volunteered for service in the Second Boer War which had broken out in 1899 between the British Empire and the Dutch-speaking Boer republics over British influence in Southern Africa. Enlisting as a private, Fitzgerald served with the Fifth (Imperial) Contingent, which was established by the South Australian government on 10 January 1901. The contingent, consisting of two and a half squadrons of mounted infantry, sailed from Port Adelaide on 9 February 1901. At embarkation, Fitzgerald held the rank of sergeant. Aboard the transport Ormazan, they stopped at Albany, Western Australia, and Cape Town, South Africa, before disembarking at Port Elizabeth on 23 March. They rode to the Kroonstad district where they joined a column commanded by British Lieutenant Colonel Beauvoir De Lisle. In early May the contingent was joined by the Sixth (Imperial) Contingent from South Australia, and formed into a single regiment. Under De Lisle's command, the South Australians did outstanding work fighting the Boers in the north eastern corner of the Orange River Colony. This included capturing several Boer convoys with large quantities of supplies, fighting off concerted Boer counter-attacks, and capturing dozens of prisoners. De Lisle described an attack carried out by the South Australians at Grootvlei on 2 August as "very dashing", and "worthy of the best traditions of Australian troops in the war".

The regiment left Bloemfontein in August and rode along the border with Basutoland, capturing more Boers and also the supplies of the Boer Ficksburg Commando. They spent the next two months patrolling the south eastern part of the Orange River Colony, but then returned north. In late October they rode 75 mi (121 km) in 22 hours to relieve the remains of a British flying column rearguard after the disastrous Battle of Bakenlaagte in the eastern Transvaal in October. In February 1902, the British tactics changed from patrolling in columns to advancing en masse and pushing the Boers towards a series of blockhouses sited along the railway lines. In a series of drives, hundreds of Boers were captured. On 18 March, Fitzgerald and his comrades received orders to return to South Australia, as their period of service was ending. Having never spent more than three consecutive days in one place, they had ridden more than 3,800 mi (6,100 km). Both contingents embarked at Cape Town on 27 March aboard the transport SS Montrose and sailed to Durban, South Africa, where they transferred to the transport SS Manchester Merchant. They departed from there on 5 April, and sailed via Albany, arriving back at Port Adelaide on 27 April. During his service in South Africa Fitzgerald was promoted to quartermaster-sergeant. Of 21 officers and 295 other ranks in the contingent, one officer and twenty other ranks were killed or died during their service in the war. On his discharge on 5 May, he received a £15 gratuity (about $3,250 in Australian dollars in 2025), his conduct was described as "excellent", and he also received the Queen's South Africa Medal with clasps "Transvaal", "South Africa 1901" and "South Africa 1902".

Upon their return to Port Pirie, Fitzgerald and other local members of the Fifth (Imperial) Contingent were greeted by the mayor and a huge crowd at the railway station. Fitzgerald spoke in response, receiving loud applause for his comments thanking those who had met the train, and expressed his and his comrades‘ condolences to the family of one of the Port Pirie men from the contingent who had been killed. After his return, Fitzgerald had some involvement in the local volunteer unit, the Port Pirie Mounted Rifles. In August 1902 he participated in a shooting match, and in September he was a member of the winning team in a military riding contest at the Port Pirie Show which including jumping hurdles.

== Port Pirie councillor and union leader ==
Following his return from the war, Fitzgerald worked on the wharves at Port Pirie. In the December 1904 Port Pirie municipal elections, Fitzgerald successfully ran for a councillor position representing the West Ward of the Corporate Town of Port Pirie, defeating the re-contesting incumbent, Richard Gilbert Symons, by 312 votes to 226, and achieving what was reported as a record turnout of voters in the ward. He had been nominated by the local branch of the Amalgamated Workers' Association (AWA) to run as the United Labor Party (ULP) candidate. In February 1905, Fitzgerald was elected as vice-president of the local branch of the ULP, and 1905 was also the president of the local branch of the AWA, which represented wharf labourers among others. In November 1905, he became a member of the Port Pirie Hospital Board. Poor health meant that he did not contest the 1905 municipal election.

In 1906, he was elected as vice-president of the ULP electorate committee for the electoral district of Stanley. He was also an Amalgamated Waterside Union delegate to the annual ULP conference in September 1906. In the same month he put his name forward for ULP candidate preselection for Stanley in case the state parliament was dissolved over a question regarding the franchise, but despite the high hopes of the AWA, he was resoundingly defeated by Harry Jackson. He ran for North Ward in the municipal election in December of that year, and gained more votes than had ever been received by a Labor candidate in that ward but was narrowly defeated by William Morrow.

In March 1907, Fitzgerald's name was put forward for preselection as the ULP candidate for a by-election to fill the vacancy in Stanley caused by the death of William Patrick Cummins, but he declined the nomination. When a casual vacancy came up for the municipal ward of Solomontown in the same month, Fitzgerald was a candidate but retired from the contest when it became obvious he would be defeated. In 1907 he was the president of the Port Pirie Literary and Debating Society. Fitzgerald ran again for West Ward in the 1907 municipal elections, but was again defeated, this time by Henry Charles Warren. In 1908, Fitzgerald was described as a "livery stable proprietor", and was the marshal-in-charge of the Eight Hours' Day march in Port Pirie. Undeterred by his lack of electoral success, Fitzgerald was a candidate for mayor in 1908, but was defeated by Montague Lewis Warren. After not contesting the 1909 council election, Fitzgerald again ran unsuccessfully for mayor against Morrow in 1910.

== Member for Port Pirie ==
In 1911 Fitzgerald was allotted a section of 40 acres (16 ha) of land for farming within the Hundred of Appila near Wirrabara, which is about 40 kilometres (25 mi) north east of Port Pirie. No longer a resident of the town, he did not contest the 1911 Port Pirie municipal elections. In 1914 Fitzgerald was approached by the Bakers' Union in Port Pirie, urging him to contest the two-seat district of Stanley for the ULP in the upcoming March 1915 state election. Despite a ULP victory at state level, Fitzgerald was unable to overcome the conservative Liberal Union candidates Henry Barwell and Robert Nicholls, and only garnered 24 per cent of the vote. In 1917 the ULP split over the question of conscription for service in the First World War, with former ULP and now National Labor parliamentarians joining the Liberal Union as a junior party in a coalition government from August 1917 until the April 1918 state election. In the meantime, the ULP changed its name to become the state branch of the Australian Labor Party (ALP).

Fitzgerald contested the 6 April 1918 election as an ALP candidate for the two-member electoral district of Port Pirie, which had been created after the 1915 election. This time Fitzgerald succeeded, receiving 32.4 per cent of the vote and being elected just behind fellow ALP candidate and future premier Lionel Hill. Despite their personal success, the split in the labour movement meant the ALP remained in opposition. Hill and Fitzgerald defeated the previous members for Port Pirie, William Cole and Harry Jackson, who had been elected as ULP members in 1915 but had defected to the National Labor Party during the 1917 conscription split. At the 1921 state election Fitzgerald again ran alongside Hill, and they were both re-elected, with Fitzgerald running second with 39.4 per cent of the vote. Their only opponent was an independent candidate. The coalition between National Labor and the Liberal Union had collapsed in 1920, and National Labour contested the election as the Progressive Country Party.

Fitzgerald and Hill won uncontested in the 1924, in which the ALP under the leadership of John Gunn defeated the conservative Liberal Federation, a merger between the Liberal Union and the former National Labor/Progressive Country Party. In the March 1927 state election Fitzgerald and Hill again won uncontested, but the ALP was defeated by a coalition of the Liberal Federation and the Country Party. In the April 1930 state election the two men were again unopposed, and the ALP formed the government with Hill as premier.

With the advent of the Great Depression in Australia, Hill met with other state premiers in June 1931 and they agreed on the Premiers' Plan of sweeping austerity measures and increased taxation. When the plan was put to a vote in the state parliament, twenty-three of the ALP's thirty members in the House of Assembly voted for it, along with two of four Legislative Council (upper house) members. Fitzgerald was one of the ALP members who voted against the legislation to implement the plan. This internal ALP disagreement was part of the split of 1931. In South Australia, the August 1931 state ALP conference expelled all of the members who had voted for the plan, including Hill and his entire cabinet. After the expelled members failed in their appeal to the ALP federal executive, they formed the Parliamentary Labor Party (PLP), and remained in government with the support of the Liberal Federation until 1932 and then the Liberal and Country League (LCL) until the April 1933 state election. Fitzgerald remained a member of the ALP during this period, although he did advocate on behalf of the PLP members at ALP state council.

Fitzgerald again won uncontested in the 1933 election alongside his new running mate Andrew Lacey, and the PLP lost government to the LCL. On 21 April 1933, Fitzgerald was elected as the deputy leader of the state branch of the ALP, with Lacey elected as leader. At 70 years of age, and as the longest serving member of the House of Assembly, Fitzgerald also became father of the house. In June 1934, a successful unity conference was held and the PLP members were readmitted to ALP membership.

== Mayor of Port Pirie ==
Soon after achieving political success at the state level, Fitzgerald also returned to council, serving as mayor of Port Pirie in 1922–23 when he won 52 per cent of the vote, succeeding James Firmin Jenkins, and again in 1923–24 when he received 62 per cent of the vote. Fitzgerald did not contest the mayoralty in 1924–25, and instead ran as a councillor for South Ward but was soundly defeated. He successfully ran for mayor in 1925–1926, receiving 58 per cent of the vote, succeeding James Sim Geddes. He was again successful in 1926–27, when he received 61 per cent of the vote. He again ran for mayor in 1927–28, and received 57 per cent of the vote. He did not recontest the mayoralty in 1928, and was succeeded by Carl August Degenhardt. He ran for mayor again in 1930 but was defeated, gaining only 46 per cent of the vote, and again 1931, when his share of the vote reduced to 40 per cent. The following year, Fitzgerald ran for one of four alderman positions, and topped the poll in an overwhelming Labor victory and stunning reversal of the previous year's council election. After council terms were extended by legislation in 1934, Fitzgerald's initial two-year term was due to end at the 1935 election, but he ran for a vacant alderman position and was elected unopposed.

== Death and legacy ==
Fitzgerald died in Port Pirie on 22 December 1936, aged 72, while still serving as both state member of parliament and local alderman, and was buried at Port Pirie Cemetery, after a funeral at which many tributes were made. A by-election in the district of Port Pirie was held on 3 March 1937 to replace Fitzgerald, and the ALP candidate, William Threadgold, was elected unopposed. Fitzgerald was replaced as deputy state Labor leader by Robert Richards.

Several prominent members of the Port Pirie community contacted the local newspaper to express their regret on the day of Fitzgerald's death, including the mayor, aldermen and councillors, religious leaders and his fellow Second Boer War veterans, and their remarks were published in the newspaper the following day alongside those of a fellow parliamentarian from the opposing LCL, Hartley Gladstone Hawkins, who described Fitzgerald as "one of the really honourable men in public life".

== Footnotes ==
Civic offices
Preceded by J. F. Jenkins	Mayor of Port Pirie; 1922–1924	Succeeded by J. S. Geddes
Preceded by J. S. Geddes	Mayor of Port Pirie; 1925–1928	Succeeded by C. A. Degenhardt
Parliament of South Australia
Preceded by Harry Jackson	Member for Port Pirie; 1918–1936; Served alongside: Lionel Hill, Andrew Lacey	Succeeded by William Threadgold
