= William Morrow (South Australian politician) =

Australian politician (1872–1934)

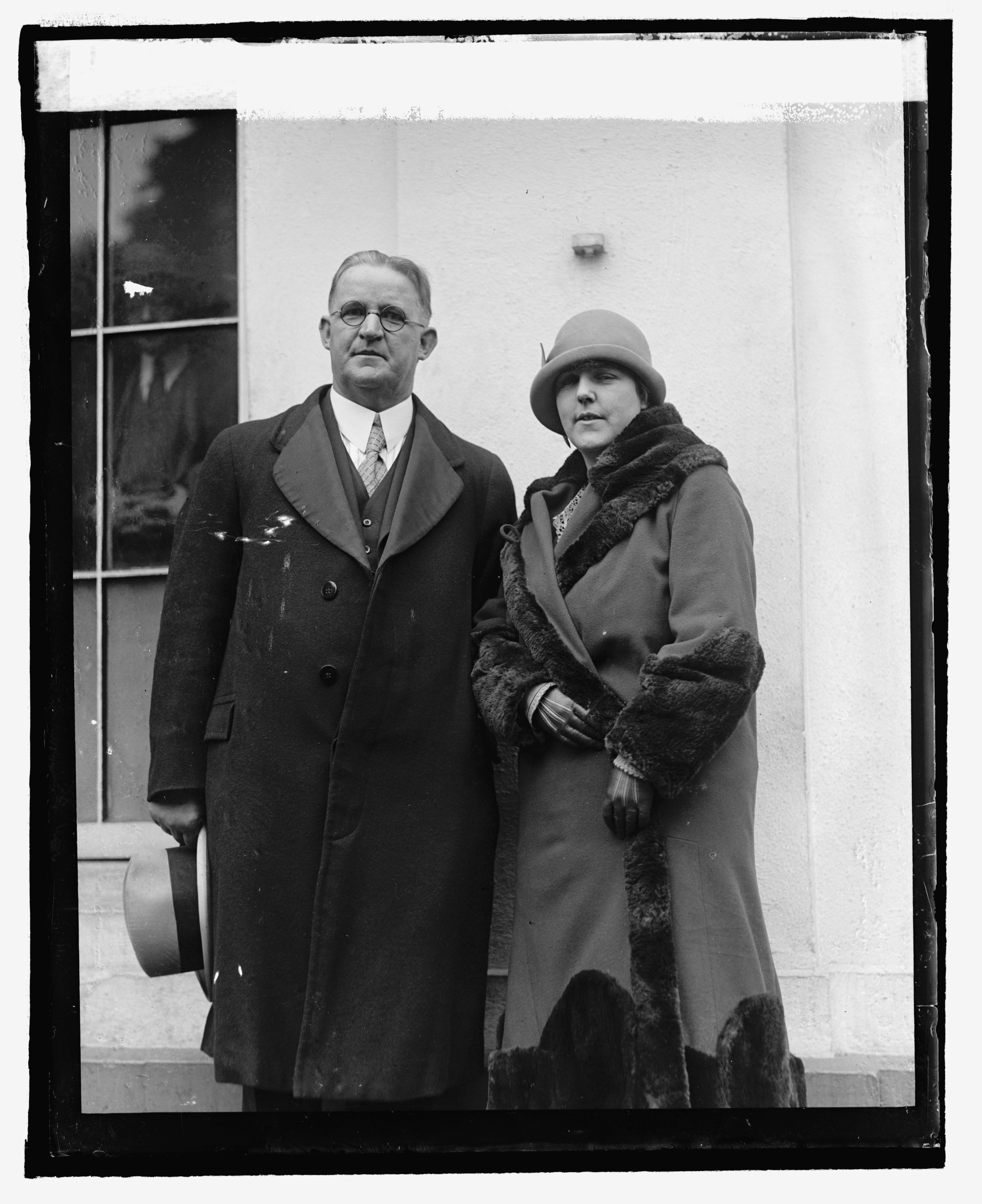

Member of the South Australian Legislative Council
- In office 1915–1934

Personal details
- Born: 15 September 1872 Bairnsdale, Victoria, Australia
- Died: 3 July 1934 (aged 61)
- Party: Liberal Union; Liberal Federation; Liberal and Country League

William Morrow (15 September 1872 – 3 July 1934) was an Australian politician. He was a member of the South Australian Legislative Council from 1915 to 1934, representing three successive conservative parties, the Liberal Union, Liberal Federation and Liberal and Country League.

== Background ==
William Morrow was born in Bairnsdale, Victoria in 1872, and had early experience as a "printer's devil" and machine operator. He moved to Queensland, where he learned the craft of a tailor, then moved to Port Pirie, South Australia, in 1891. Entering into partnership as tailors and outfitters on Alexander Street with William J. Paull, whom he bought out 12 months later. In 1899, he built new premises at the corner of Ellen and David streets, where the Commonwealth Bank and other businesses were later situated. He sold his business to H. W. "Bert" Overland and left Port Pirie in 1915.

== Politics ==
Morrow was elected councillor for North Ward of the Corporate Town of Port Pirie in 1904, and he was appointed mayor in December 1909, M. L. Warren succeeding him as councillor. Port Pirie experienced considerable progress during his two years in the mayoral chair, but his skills as chairman tested regularly, as the parties were neatly balanced and he was continually having to exercise his casting vote.

He stood for the Assembly seat of Stanley (which then included Port Pirie) at the election of February 1912. Three members were required, and his two fellow Liberal candidates were Henry Barwell and Elliot McDonald; with Harry Jackson, Clarence Goode and William Cole standing for Labor. The election was fiercely fought, and the results were close: Jackson, 6,106; Goode, 6,092; Cole, 5,811; McDonald, 5,708; Barwell, 5,647; Morrow, 5,613. One of the candidates (McDonald) suggested that inefficient scrutiny and vote counting had helped ensure Labor's victory.

In 1915, Morrow was elected unopposed as one of the members of the Northern district in the Legislative Council. He was instrumental in the rise to power of Sir Henry Barwell, but was chagrined when, on a visit to London, that same gentleman, then Agent-General, gave him the cold shoulder.

== Other interests ==
William Morrow was probably the most prominent layman of the South Australian Church of Christ, of which was a member for 35 years. He was president of both the Federal and State conferences, and was vice-president of the world conference of the Churches of Christ, while for many years he was chairman of the Federal foreign mission board and chairman of the denomination's girls' college. He took many trips overseas both for pleasure and on church business, his first visit to the Old Country and America being made in 1905, accompanied by Mr. W. Cottle.

== Family ==
He married Melinda J. Bunney (died 1909) of Port Pirie in 1895. In 1921, he married Iris Victoria Shepherd of Adelaide, who survived him. Children by his first wife were Mrs. D. E. Edwards of Naracoorte and Reginald R. Morrow of Adelaide, and William S. Morrow by the second. His last residence was at 28 Victoria avenue, Dulwich.

Civic offices
Preceded by M. L. Warren	Mayor of Port Pirie; 1910–1911	Succeeded by H. C. Alford
South Australian Legislative Council
Preceded by Arthur Addison	Member for Northern District; 1915–1934; Served alongside: Bice, Blesing, Howe, Lewis, Mills, Ritchie	Succeeded by Lyell McEwin
