= Clarence Goode =

Australian politician

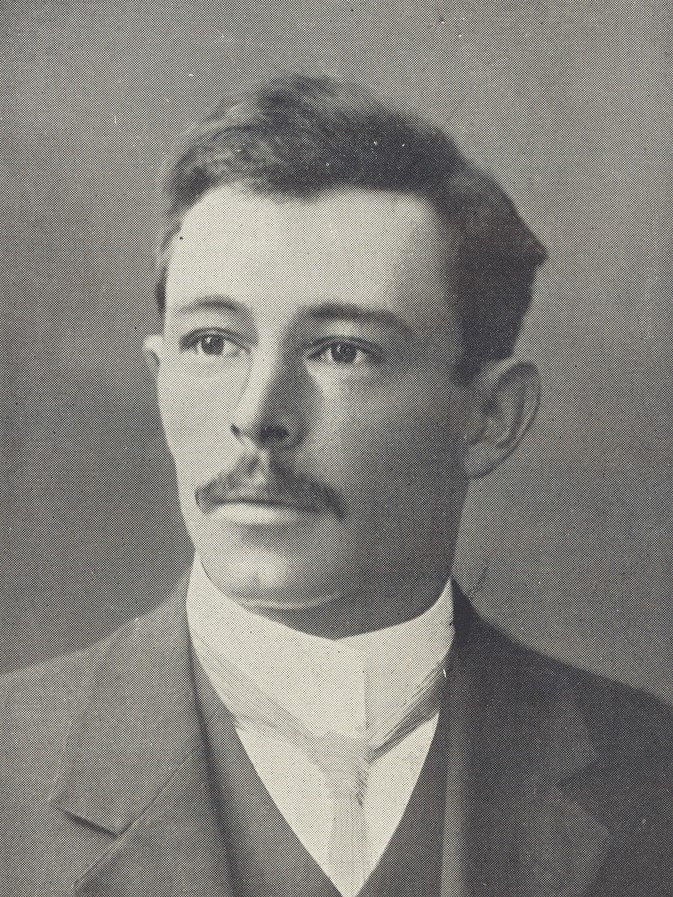

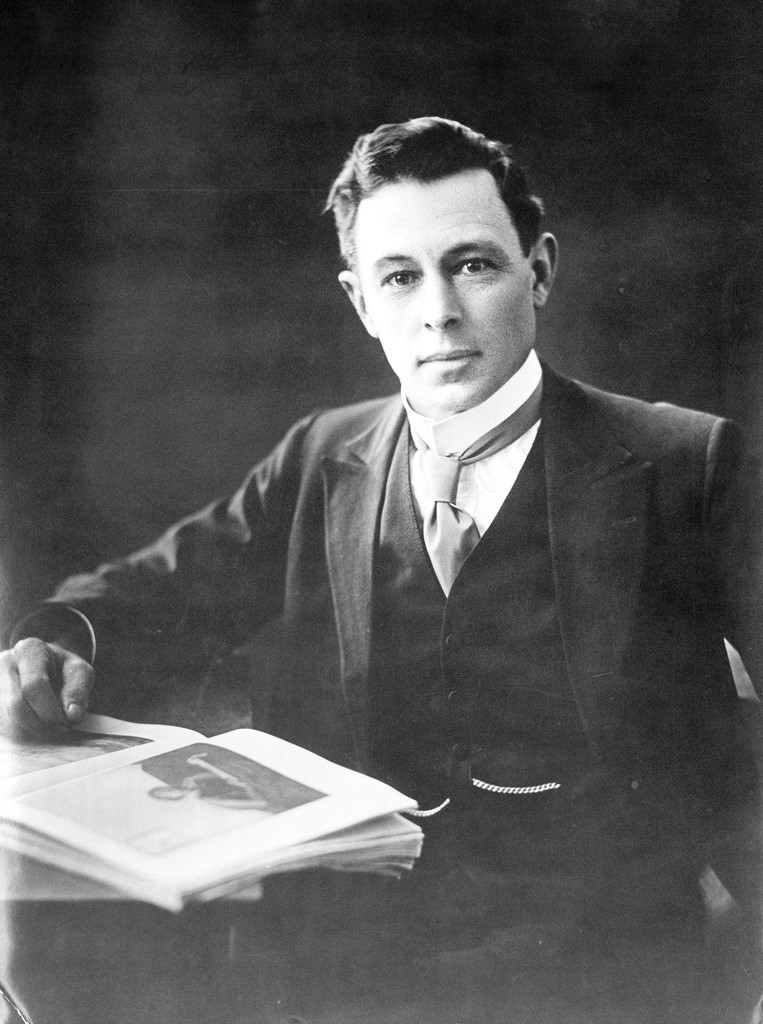

Clarence Goode (17 August 1875 – 30 April 1969) was a farmer and politician in South Australia. Descendants pronounce the family name to rhyme with "wood".

== History ==
Clarence was born at Canowie Station the son of Thomas Goode. He was educated privately and at the Canowie Public School, then at Frederick Caterer's Glenelg Grammar School. He was for many years occupied in farming and grazing (at Laura then with Albert Powell at Booyoolie estate near Gladstone), and was elected Councillor for the Corporate Town of Gladstone in December 1902, and was returned unopposed two years later. He was for some time Chairman of the Gladstone branch of the Agricultural Bureau. At the 1905 election he was returned to the Assembly at the head of the poll for Stanley for the United Labor Party with colleagues Harry Jackson and William Cole, and was re-elected at the 1906, 1910, 1912 and 1915 elections, with colleague Peter Reidy. Goode joined the National Party in 1917 but left in 1918, he later clarified that he had only resigned from the parliamentary National Party. Goode opted to retire to give Reidy a clear run rather than recontest as an independent. He served as Commissioner of Crown Lands and Minister of Agriculture in the Crawford Vaughan Labor government from 3 April 1915 to 14 July 1917 in what was criticised as the "Family Ministry" (Attorney-General John Howard Vaughan being the Premier's brother and Clarence his brother-in-law). Goode was one of the Vaughan Government ministers whom A. T. Saunders singled out for complicity in shady land deals, notably the purchase, from colleagues, of land at inflated prices to be passed on in 200-acre lots to First AIF soldiers ("soldier-settlers").

Goode claimed to have been largely instrumental in establishing the wartime wheat scheme, which saved the farmers of Australia at that time from financial ruin. That, and initiation of the Australian Shipping Board, brought him into close association for nearly two years with some of the most able businessmen in Australia. In 1918 he left politics, and was not a member of any political party for more than 18 years.

Goode was appointed general manager of the British Australian Cotton-growing Association, a position he relinquished in November 1923 to take up cotton growing at Miles, Queensland, in part on the recommendation of one of his brothers who had moved to that State. His experience was disappointing however, and he returned penniless to South Australia ten years later, residing in a rented house at 301 Military Road, Henley Beach. Work was scarce and he was reduced to working as a cleaner at Centennial Park Cemetery.

In 1935, in the depths of the Great Depression, Goode stood as Independent candidate for the Central District No. 2 in a legislative council by-election. Some of the policies he advocated were:— Placing all able-bodied men in useful work at full rates or pay and more liberal pensions for those unable to work and the widowed and fatherless. Proportional representation to give substantial minorities representation in Parliament. He supported "the people's verdict on six o'clock closing of hotel bars." He advocated radical alterations to the system by constitutional methods, quoting Henry George's remark that a country could not go on permitting men to vote and forcing them to tramp, nor educating boys and girls and refusing them the right to earn an honest living. E. W. Holden won the seat; Goode came a distant third.

Goode subsequently found employment with A. M. Bickford and Sons. He never lost his interest in public affairs, and was a frequent contributor to the "Letters to the Editor" in The Advertiser.

== Family ==
He married Helen Ethel Miriam "Ethel" Marston ( – 8 March 1904) on 17 August 1900. They had a son on 20 May 1901 at Mt. Herbert, Gladstone, before Ethel died of tuberculosis. He married again, to Ethel's sister Hilda Anna Margaret Marston. They had a son Ray on 14 July 1909, a daughter on 14 March 1912 at Unley, another daughter on 9 December 1920 at Parkside.

Goode died on 30 April 1969. His last residences were 301 Military road, Henley Beach, then 1 Murray Avenue, Koongarra Park.

Political offices
Preceded by Richard Butler	Commissioner of Crown Lands and Immigration; 1915–1917	Succeeded by George Ritchie
Preceded by Thomas Pascoe	Minister for Agriculture; 1915–1917	Succeeded by George Ritchie
Parliament of South Australia
Preceded by Frederick William Young	Member for Stanley; 1905–1915; Served alongside: Catt, Cole, Cummins, Duncan, Jackson	Succeeded by Henry Barwell; Robert Nicholls
New seat	Member for Victoria; 1915–1918; Served alongside: Peter Reidy	Succeeded by Vernon Petherick
