= Peter Paul Gillen =

Australian politician

Peter Paul Gillen (7 July 1858 – 22 September 1896) was a storekeeper and politician and an activist for Aboriginal rights within Australia in the colonial days of South Australia. He studied, recorded and documented many ancient Aboriginal ceremonies for educational purposes and was respected by the Aboriginal communities of Australia. He was also Commissioner of Crown Lands from 1892 to 1896 when he died in office.

Gillen was born at Golden Grove, South Australia, the second son of Thomas Gillen ( – ) and his wife Bridget née McCan ( – ); they moved to Clare around 1862. He was educated at the Grammar School, Clare, run by L. W. Stanton (c. 1844–1925), later Assistant Inspector-General of Schools, and Robert Graham. He started working at Clare for Andrew Clarke in his store, later run by J. B. Carr, and subsequently founded the storekeeping business of Gillen & Graham, which became P. & P. P. Gillen with his uncle Philip Gillen ( – 23 July 1908), later carried on solely by him.

In 1889 he was appointed Auditor to the Corporation of Clare. and in 1886 he was elected a Councillor. He took a lively interest in his district, and retained his popularity throughout his business and political career. He was a prominent member of the Australian Natives Association. He was a Director of several Western Australian mining Companies and. A member of the Catholic Church, he was a Director of the Southern Cross newspaper with the Hon. James O'Loghlin, and like him a supporter of the Irish National League.

He was elected by the electorate of Stanley to the South Australian House of Assembly to fill the vacancy left by the resignation of Edward William Hawker, and served from June 1889 to September 1896, when he died. His colleagues were Charles Kimber, followed by John Miller then Hawker, who had been studying mineralogy in England. He has been reported as one of the first three members elected after the passing of the Payment of Members Act. He was returned by a large majority at the general election in the following year. One of the first debates in which he made his presence was Sir John Downer's Divorce Bill, to which he had a strong opposition. He was regarded as a fluent debater, though at times rather excitable, with a reputation for thoroughness and honesty. In 1892 he was appointed Commissioner of Crown Lands in the short-lived Holder cabinet, the youngest minister to that time, and reappointed to that role in the Kingston cabinet the following year. His administration of the Land Acts was marked by conspicuous ability, but his name was principally associated with the Village Settlements scheme of 1894.

He collapsed and died of a heart attack during a Cabinet meeting. He was buried at Sevenhills on 22 September 1896

== Family ==
Gillen married Mary Gertrude Cousins (c. 1860 – 22 January 1929) of Clare on 24 May 1881. Their family included

- eldest Peter Gillen (c. 1844 – )

He had two brothers: Francis James Gillen S.M. (1855–1912), Stationmaster of Alice Springs, a noted ethnologist and explorer, and Thomas Philip Gillen (1868–1941), who operated a store in Clare with his uncle, Philip Gillen. He also had two sisters — a Miss Gillen, of Clare, and Mary Jane Gillen ( – 25 October 1948), who married James Patrick Butler (c. 1861–1936), a mounted constable who was stationed for some time at Happy Valley.

== See also ==
- Hundred of Gillen

== Sources ==
- Van Den Hoorn, Rob (1983). "Gillen, Peter Paul (1858–1896)". Australian Dictionary of Biography. National Centre of Biography, Australian National University. ISBN 978-0-522-84459-7. ISSN 1833-7538. OCLC 70677943.
