= Kossuth William Duncan =

Australian politician

Kossuth William Duncan (29 July 1857 – 30 June 1919) was a South Australian miller and politician. He was a member of the South Australian Legislative Council for Northern District from 1900 to 1902 and a member of the South Australian House of Assembly for Stanley from 1907 to 1910. He was later mayor of the Corporate Town of Laura from 1913 to 1914.

== History ==
Kossuth W. Duncan was born in Hindmarsh, the second son of R. B. Duncan who arrived in South Australia aboard the Fitzjames in 1855. As a youth be started work for the flour milling company of Magarey & Co. then, for 20 years, with the Adelaide Milling Company. For a long time he was manager for that firm at Port Pirie, and a member of the Port Pirie Council. He was two years in Port Augusta. He served two years in the Legislative Council as member for the Northern District, and as a member of the House of Assembly for the District of Stanley. Around 1902 he moved to Laura, and for a number of years with Joseph King of Georgetown, as King & Duncan, ran the Laura flour mill. In 1911 he was elected, unopposed, to the Corporate Town of Laura, representing North Ward, and was Mayor in 1913-14. They later lived in Dulwich Avenue, Dulwich, South Australia.

== Other interests ==
He was an active member of the Church of Christ, and from 1914 a trustee of the State Bank.

== Family ==
He married Mary Ann Turton on 12 November 1879; their children included K. R. Duncan, Mrs L. C. Walter of Stone Hut, Mrs H. R. Hammill of Laura, and Mrs J. Weston of Glenside.

South Australian Legislative Council
Preceded by Ebenezer Ward	Member for Northern District; 1900–1902; Served alongside: Addison, Howe, Tennant, Bice	Succeeded by John Lewis
South Australian House of Assembly
Preceded by William Patrick Cummins	Member for Stanley; 1907–1910; Served alongside: Harry Jackson, Clarence Goode	Succeeded by William Cole
Civic offices
Preceded by J. F. Roennfeldt	Mayor of Laura; 1913–1914	Succeeded by H. G. Rowland
