= District Council of Pirie =

Former local government area of South Australia

Coordinates: 33°11′09″S 138°01′01″E

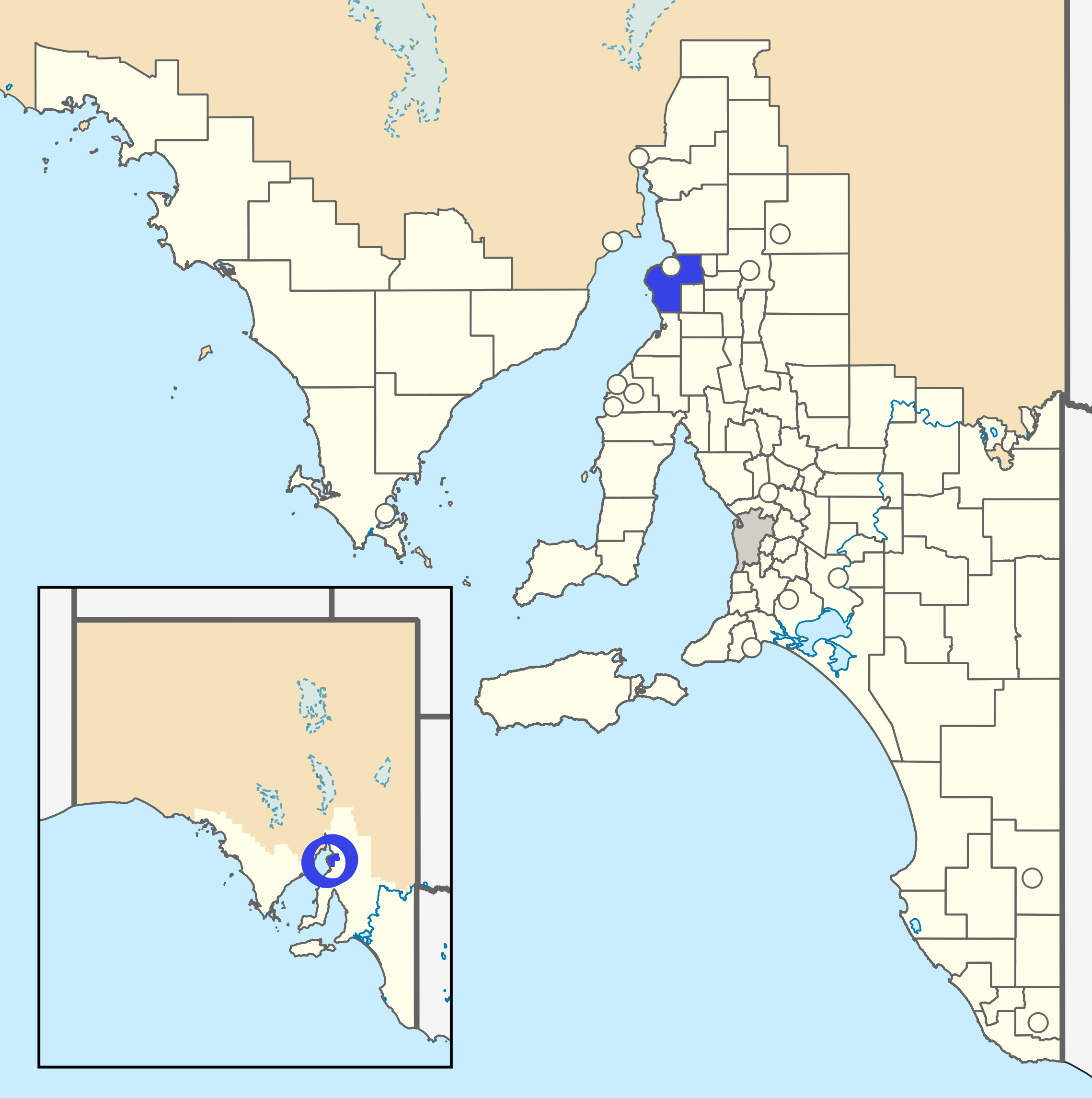
The District Council of Pirie (blue) as it was in 1970, prior to merging with the City of Port Pirie (marked by a circle)

The District Council of Pirie was a local government area in South Australia from 1892 to 1996. It surrounded, but did not include, the city of Port Pirie, which had its own municipal government as the City of Port Pirie.

The District Council was proclaimed on 16 June 1892, when the portion of the Hundred of Pirie not included in the Corporate Town (later City) of Port Pirie, the Hundred of Wandearah and the northern portions of the Hundreds of Napperby and Howe was excised from the District Council of Crystal Brook and formed into its own municipality. The council decided to purchase land for a council chambers in David Street, Port Pirie at its second meeting in August, with the 25 ft by 17 ft wood and iron building open by October of that year. The council was divided into three wards in 1897 (Pirie, Wandearah and Napperby), each electing two councillors. It was to have only two clerks in its first fifty years: Edwin Ebenezer Davis until his 1928 death, followed by Edwin Rule Glasson.

The inaugural boundaries were similarly described in 1936, when the council was reported to control a total area of 248,000 acres. In that year, it had a population of 2,100, with 616 ratepayers, electing councillors from three wards. In February 1936, a replacement council office was built at a cost of £400 after the first offices were reported to have "almost collapsed". It was reported on the council's golden jubilee in 1942 that it had spent £150,000 on main roads over the course of its history.

The council ceased to exist in July 1996, when it merged into the City of Port Pirie. The merged municipality subsequently amalgamated with the District Council of Crystal Brook-Redhill to form the Port Pirie Regional Council in March 1997.

== Chairmen ==
- E. H. Eagle (1892–1903)
- W. S. Fidge (1903–1909)
- W. Smith (1909–1911)
- A. J. Dennis (1911–1913)
- T. Johns (1913–1914)
- G. Ferme (1914–1918)
- D. L. McEwen (1918–1919)
- A. A. Button (1919–1929)
- Edwin Boucher Welch (1929–1937)
- Andrew Martin Lawrie (1937–1939)
- Harold Fulton (Rhen) Welch (1939–1946)
- David Charles (Paddy) Ferme (1946–1953)
- Henry Boucher (Harry) Welch (1953–1955)
- Angus Vivian Bain (1955–1963)
- David Charles (Paddy) Ferme (1963–1978)
- Victor Albert Hannan (1978-?)
