= John George Bice =

Australian politician (1853–1923)

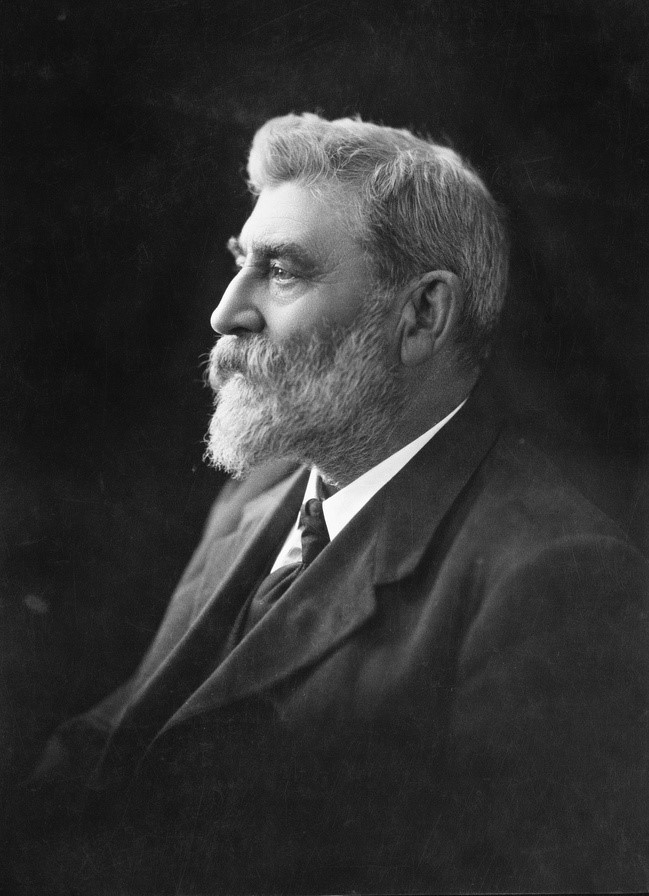
John George Bice c. 1919

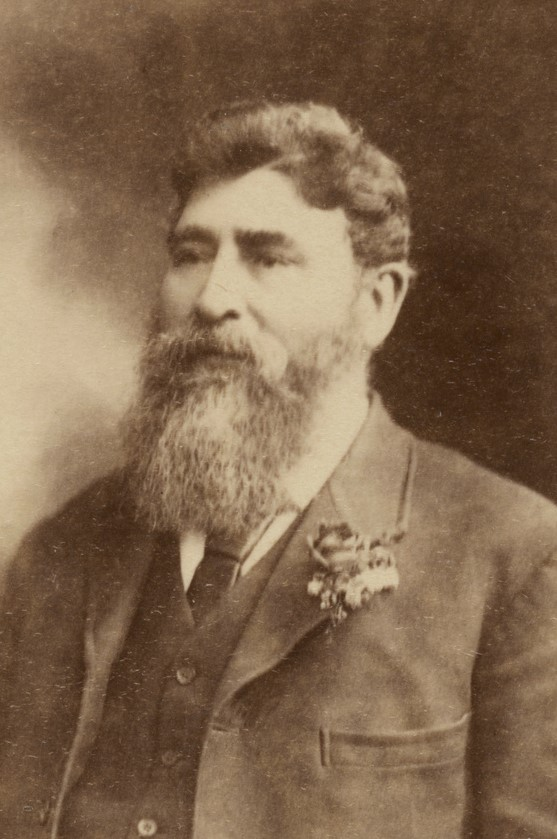
John George Bice c. 1902

Sir John George Bice KCMG (24 June 1853 – 9 November 1923) was a blacksmith and politician in the colony and State of South Australia.

== History ==
Bice was born in Callington, Cornwall, the son of Samuel Sandoe Bice (died 1903), a mining captain who was brought out to South Australia in 1864 to work for the Wallaroo and Moonta Mining Company, and for whom he worked for more than 50 years.

Young John began his working life in the Moonta mines, improving his education at night school. He was soon indentured as a blacksmith's apprentice, and qualified as a tradesman. In 1876 he took over a machinist's business at Wilmington (then called "Beautiful Valley") owned by the Trewenack brothers of Port Augusta. In 1880 he and W. H. Trewenack took over John Trewenack's blacksmith and wheelwright's business in Port Augusta and prospered.

== Politics ==
Bice was for eight years a member of the Corporate Town of Port Augusta council, and was mayor from 1888 to 1889. In 1894 he was elected to represent the Northern District in the Legislative Council. In 1897 he was appointed to the Pastoral Commission, and in 1908 joined the Price-Peake administration as Minister for the Northern Territory and Minister of Water Supply. He held those portfolios until 30 December, when after the death of Tom Price he became Chief Secretary and Minister of Industry in the first Peake Administration. He held that office until 3 June 1910. Mr. Peake again returned to power on 17 February 1912, and Bice was Chief Secretary for the term of that Ministry, which lasted until 3 April 1915, when Vaughan Government came to power. On 14 July 1917, when Peake again assumed office, Bice was given the portfolios of Commissioner of Public Works, Minister of Mines, and Minister of Marine. He also took up the post of Chief Secretary. From 1920 he was Chief Secretary and Minister of Marine; his Ministerial career extended over a longer period than almost any other Minister.

He was made KCMG in 1923.

== Other interests ==
He was on the board of governors of the Botanic Garden from 1896 and on the council of the School of Mines and Industries from 1898.

He was a bibliophile, bookbinder, and fisherman. His favorite South Australian spots were Port Noarlunga and Kangaroo Island.

== Family ==
He married Elizabeth Jane Trewenack in 1875. They had a home "Norleybank" at Beaumont, then moved to 37 Bishop's Place Kensington. Her parents were lost in the sinking of the steamship Gambier on 23 August 1891.

He died of double pneumonia at a private hospital in Adelaide. He had been a pipe smoker for 50 years. He had two daughters and a son, who survived him, John Leonard Sandoe Bice, who served on the Legislative Council from 1941 to 1959. His other son, Frederick William Bice, was a metallurgist who was accidentally killed 16 July 1906 at the Blinman Mines, SA, where he was employed as an assayer. Frederick's daughter (that is John George Bice's granddaughter), Doreen Bice, executed the fine oil painting of the Rapid held by the South Australian Maritime Museum after a watercolor sketch by William Light.

Civic offices
| Preceded by David Drysdale | Mayor of Port Augusta; 1887–1889 | Succeeded by C. E. Robertson |
South Australian Legislative Council
| Preceded by William Copley | Member for Northern District; 1894–1923; Served alongside: Darling Sr., Campbell, Ward, Tennant, Duncan, Addison, Howe, Morrow, Lewis | Succeeded by Percy Blesing; William George Mills |
Political offices
| Preceded by Frederick Samuel Wallis | Chief Secretary; 1909 – 1910 | Succeeded by Frederick Samuel Wallis |
| Preceded by Frederick Samuel Wallis | Chief Secretary; 1912 – 1915 | Succeeded by Alfred William Styles |
| Preceded by Harry Jackson | Commissioner of Public Works; 1917 – 1919 | Succeeded by George Ritchie |
| Preceded by Archibald Peake | Chief Secretary; 1919 – 1923 | Succeeded by Thomas Pascoe |
