= Von Doussa =

Von Doussa is a surname. Notable people with the surname include:

- Alfred von Doussa (1848–1926), Australian businessman and politician
- John von Doussa (born 1940), Australian judge and public servant
- Louis von Doussa (1850–1932), Australian lawyer and politician
