= Threadgold =

Threadgold is an occupational surname of English origin. Notable people with the surname include:

- Harry Threadgold (1924–1996), English footballer
- Mark Threadgold (born 1977), Australian painter
- William Threadgold (1885–1946), Australian politician
- Stuart Threadgold (born 1971), Australian architect

== See also ==
- Thredgold
