= Corporate Town of Laura =

Local government area in South Australia

Coordinates: 33°11′S 138°18′E

The Corporate Town of Laura was a local government area in South Australia, centred on the town of Laura. It was proclaimed on 22 June 1882, separating the township of Laura itself from the surrounding District Council of Booyoolie. It held its first meeting at the Laura Hotel on 24 June. One of their first acts was to undertake a program of plantings in streets and local parks. The council acquired the Laura Institute in 1887; from then onwards, the building served as the Laura Town Hall. The former council chambers was subsequently let as a dwelling and then to the R.S.S.I.L.A. In 1910, the council's responsibilities included maintenance of roads, kerbing and paving, sanitary inspection, street lighting, maintenance of the town hall and sports oval pavilion and local parklands. It ceased to exist on 30 April 1932, when it amalgamated with the Booyoolie council to form the new District Council of Laura.

== Mayors of Laura ==
- S. N. Walter (1882–1883)
- F. T. Sabine (1883–1884)
- J. C. Kaufmann (1884–1887)
- W. Wilson (1887–1889)
- I. Taylor (1889–1892)
- George Isaac Bills (1892–1895)
- J. T. Close (1895–1896)
- J. Spicer (1897–1900)
- I. Taylor (1900–1901)
- G. I. Bills (1903–1904)
- William Cole (1904–1910)
- J. F. Roennfeldt (1910–1913)
- Kossuth William Duncan (1913–1914)
- H. G. Rowland (1914–1916)
- W. Bills (1916–1917)
- C. Felstead (1917–1920)
- F. L. Bundey (1920–1923)
- J. Watt (1923–1925)
- J. L. Kennedy (1930–1932)
