= Thredgold =

Thredgold is a surname of early medieval English origin. Derived from the Middle English word "threden", it is an occupational nickname for an embroiderer, specifically one who embroidered fine clothes with gold thread.

Notable people with the surname include:

- Chris Thredgold (born 1971), Australian footballer
- Gavin Thredgold (born 1961), Australian rowing coxswain and coach

Thredgold is a very rare surname not many people have. Thredgold surnames have been mainly found in Australia and England. Australia is estimated to have about 105 people with the surname Thredgold.

== See also ==
- Threadgold
