= William Bowman (miller) =

Australian pastoralist (ca. 1811 – 1894)

William Bowman (c. 1811 – 29 May 1894) was an Australian pioneer farmer, grazier, flour miller and merchant on the Finniss River near Middleton, South Australia.

== History ==
William and Alexander were sons of Archibald Bowman and Anne Murdoch Bowman (ca.1781 – 9 January 1866) of Cawder Mill, near Glasgow, Scotland.

William Bowman arrived in South Australia in 1839, and began farming with Thomas Hogarth at Black Forest. He was an early adopter of the Ridley reaper, and spent much time and money in perfecting the reaper-winnower. He joined the rush to the Victorian gold diggings, and returned to develop the "View Bank" farming and grazing property on the River Finniss, near Middleton.He sold "View Bank" to W. S. Rogers around 1878. He was proprietor of the Middleton flour mills, which he operated in partnership with Arthur Richman Addison for many years. He carried on a large business as a wheat buyer and chaff merchant, but with the decline of the river trade, the business became unprofitable, and the mill was sold in 1886 when he was forced to declare Bankruptcy. He then retired to Mount Barker. He was for a time Justice of the Peace. He was a supporter of the Mount Barker Show Society, and frequently acted as a judge at the Mount Barker Agricultural Show. He was a member of the board of management of the Mount Barber Presbyterian Church. He died after a short illness. "View Bank" was later taken over by Charles Henry Dunn (1859–1936).

== Family ==
William was married and had nine children:

- eldest daughter Helen (died 6 May 1920) married Charles William (Wilson?) Colman (ca.1841 – 14 May 1927) on 27 February 1867, lived at Port Elliot
- second daughter Annie Murdoch married George Septimus Read (ca.1832 – 22 August 1900) on 3 May 1878, lived at Victor Harbor
- third daughter Elizabeth (died 12 January 1889) married Arthur Richman Addison on 12 May 1870
- fourth daughter Jessie married William George Percy Joyner ( ) on 6 August 1877
- fifth daughter Agnes Bowman (ca.1852 – 26 November 1886) married Louis von Doussa on 16 April 1874
- eldest son Archibald (9 July 1854 – 25 April 1867)
- sixth daughter Belle (ca.1855 – 29 November 1892) married William Hogarth, son of Thomas Hogarth MLC on 28 April 1881. He was manager of Momba station, NSW.
- son James "Jim" Bowman (12 January 1858 – 1925) married Agnes Love Johnston (ca.1860 – 8 October 1896) on 24 November 1887; they lived at "Beefacres". His wife was daughter of Andrew Galbraith Johnston of Oakbank; died after taking poison. He was overseer of Momba station in 1889.
- seventh daughter Jane Smart Bowman (ca.1859 – 27 October 1863) died of scarlatina

His brother Alexander Bowman JP. (ca.1818 – 23 July 1896) married Hellen Smart (ca.1836 – 3 December 1859; died of TB) on 15 September 1857. He married again, to Margaret Knight (ca.1829 – 6 December 1918) of Strathalbyn on 30 March 1865. He was a partner in Middleton mill, retired to "Cawder", Port Elliot.

Both brothers were buried in the Port Elliot cemetery. There is no clear family relationship between William and Alexander Bowman and the extensive family of the Bowman Brothers in the Mid-North of South Australia.
