= 1912 South Australian state election =

- 10 February 1912

All 40 seats in the South Australian House of Assembly 21 seats were needed for a majority
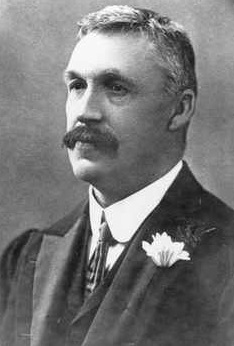

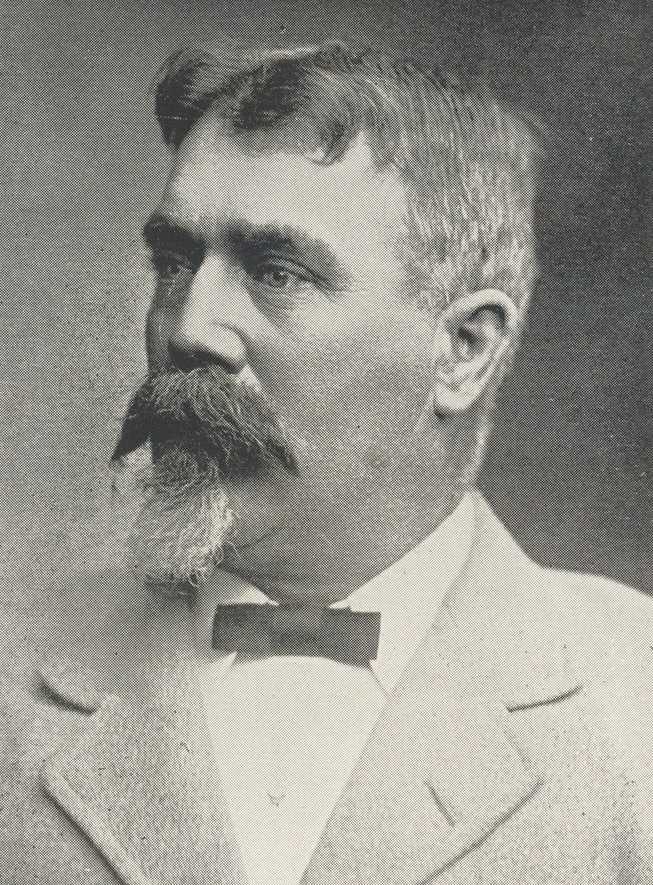
	First party	Second party
Leader	Archibald Peake	John Verran
Party	Liberal Union	Labor
Leader since	5 June 1909	5 June 1909
Leader's seat	Victoria and Albert	Wallaroo
Last election	20 seats	22 seats
Seats won	24 seats	16 seats
Seat change	▲4	▼6
Percentage	51.41%	46.77%
Swing	▲1.83	▼2.32
- Results by electoral district for the House of Assembly
Premier before election
John Verran
Labor
Elected Premier
Archibald Peake
Liberal Union

State elections were held in South Australia on 10 February 1912. All 40 seats in the South Australian House of Assembly were up for election. The incumbent United Labor Party government led by Premier of South Australia John Verran was defeated by the opposition Liberal Union led by Leader of the Opposition Archibald Peake. Each of the 13 districts elected multiple members, with voters casting multiple votes.

House of Assembly (FPTP) — Turnout 71.9% (Non-CV) — Informal 1.4%
Party	Votes	%	Swing	Seats	Change
Liberal Union	278,277	51.41	+1.83	24	+4
United Labor Party	253,163	46.77	-2.32	16	-6
Independent	9,817	1.81	+0.49	0	0
Total	541,257			40	-2
Liberal Union	Win			24	+4
United Labor Party				16	-6

== See also ==
- Members of the South Australian House of Assembly, 1912-1915
- Members of the South Australian Legislative Council, 1912–1915
