= George Young (Australian politician) =

Australian politician

Member of the South Australian House of Assembly for Stanley
- In office November 1862 – February 1865

Personal details
- Born: c. 1822
- Died: 29 April 1869
- Occupation: Businessman; politician

George Young (c. 1822 – 29 April 1869) was a businessman and politician in the colony of South Australia.

== History ==
In 1845, George Young and William Younghusband founded a woolbroking and shipping business "William Younghusband, jun. & Co.", with offices in Gilbert Street, Adelaide. The company was wound up in 1867.

George Young emigrated to South Australia on the Theresa, arriving on 3 May 1847 with his brothers, among them Gavin David Young ( – 28 February 1881), and together took up land at Mintaro. He and Gavin have been described as surveyors and land agents.

He may have been a member of the Loyal Wallaroo Lodge of Oddfellows.

He was living at Watervale in 1857, was appointed J.P. in July 1858, and was an active member of the Northern Agricultural Society. By 1867 he was living in Torrens Park. He was a director of the Wallaroo mines. He may have been Chairman of the South Australian Insurance Company and a director of the South Australian Gas Company.

He represented the seat of Stanley in the South Australian House of Assembly from November 1862 to February 1865 as the associate of G. S. Kingston. He declined nomination for the succeeding parliament on account of ill health, and died in Parkside after some years as a virtual invalid.
