= Electoral district of Port Pirie =

Former electoral district in South Australia

Coordinates: 33°11′9″S 138°1′1″E

Port Pirie South Australia—House of Assembly
- State: South Australia
- Created: 1915
- Abolished: 1970
- Namesake: Port Pirie, South Australia
- Demographic: Rural

Port Pirie was an electoral district of the House of Assembly in the Australian state of South Australia from 1915 to 1970.

Port Pirie was abolished after a boundary redistribution in 1970 when the Electoral district of Pirie was created. The last member for Port Pirie, David McKee transferred to Pirie.

The town of Port Pirie is currently located in the seat of Stuart.

== Members ==
Two members (1915–1938)
Member	Party	Term	Member	Party	Term
William Cole	Labor	1915–1917	Harry Jackson	Labor	1915–1917
William Cole	National	1917–1918	Harry Jackson	National	1917–1918
Lionel Hill	Labor	1918–1931	John Fitzgerald	Labor	1918–1936
Lionel Hill	Parliamentary Labor	1931–1933	John Fitzgerald	Labor	1918–1936
Andrew Lacey	Labor	1933–1938	John Fitzgerald	Labor	1918–1936
Andrew Lacey	Labor	1933–1938	William Threadgold	Labor	1937–1938

Single-member (1938–1970)
Member	Party	Term
Andrew Lacey	Labor	1938–1946
Charles Davis	Labor	1946–1959
Dave McKee	Labor	1959–1970
