= Louis von Doussa =

Australian lawyer and politician

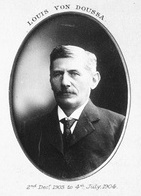

Member of South Australian House of Assembly for Mount Barker
- In office 1889 – 1902 Serving with Charles Dumas
- Preceded by: Albert Henry Landseer
- Succeeded by: Seat abolished

Member of South Australian Legislative Council for the Southern District
- In office 1903 – 1905 Serving with: George Riddoch; Lancelot Stirling; Alfred von Doussa
- Preceded by: John Hannah Gordon
- Succeeded by: John Downer

Attorney-General of South Australia
- In office 2 December 1903 – 4 July 1904
- Premier: John Jenkins
- Preceded by: John Hannah Gordon
- Succeeded by: Robert Homburg

Minister for Education
- In office 2 December 1903 – 4 July 1904
- Premier: John Jenkins
- Preceded by: John Hannah Gordon
- Succeeded by: Robert Homburg

Personal details
- Born: Charles Louis von Doussa; 17 May 1850 Hahndorf
- Died: 27 May 1932 (aged 82)
- Resting place: Mount Barker
- Spouses: Agnes Bowman (m. 1874; died 1886) Ruby Louisa Farrar, née Smythe (m. 1905; died 1920)
- Relations: Alfred von Doussa (brother); William Bowman (father-in-law)
- Parents: Alfred von Doussa (father); Anna Dorothea von Doussa, née Schach (mother)
- Occupation: lawyer

Charles Louis von Doussa (better known as Louis von Doussa; 17 May 1850 – 27 May 1932) was an Australian lawyer and politician. He was a member of the South Australian House of Assembly for Mount Barker from 1889 to 1902 and a member of the South Australian Legislative Council for the Southern District from 1903 to 1905. He was Attorney-General of South Australia and Minister for Education in the Jenkins government from 1903 to 1904.

== History ==
Von Doussa was born in Hahndorf the second son of Emil Louis Alfred von Doussa (ca.1809 – 17 December 1882), an officer of the Prussian army, who emigrated to South Australia in 1846 with his wife Anna Dorothea von Doussa, née Schach. (ca.1811 – 17 March 1881) He was educated at Hahndorf College and afterwards tutored privately by George R. Irvine, formerly a master at St Peter's College. On 11 June 1866 he was articled to J. J. Bonnar of Strathalbyn, and admitted to the bar in 1871. He began practice at Mount Barker in 1872.

== Politics ==
Von Doussa represented the House of Assembly electoral district of Mount Barker from 1899 to 1902, then was defeated by a narrow majority when the Mount Barker, Noarlunga and Encounter Bay districts were merged into the electoral district of Alexandra. In December 1903 he was elected unopposed to the seat in the Legislative Council vacated when John Hannah Gordon was elevated to the bench of the Supreme Court of South Australia. He was appointed Attorney-General of South Australia and Minister of Education in the Jenkins Ministry, but relinquished both in 1904 when his health suffered. He retired from politics in 1905.

== Law ==
In his 60 years as a lawyer, Von Doussa practised in the High Court, and in every jurisdiction of the Supreme and lower courts of the State. T. S. O'Halloran KC., William Edward Pyne, and S. B. von Doussa served their articles with him. He was appointed a Special Magistrate in 1927.

== Other interests ==
He followed cricket avidly, and watched every Test Match played in Adelaide. In his older years, Lawn Bowls was his chief sporting activity. He was president, then Patron, of the Mount Barker Bowling Club, and represented South Australia in Interstate matches. He was Patron of the Mount Barker Agricultural Society and Cricket Club. He was lay reader and churchwarden at the (Anglican) Christ Church, Mount Barker, and Church advocate in the Diocese of Adelaide from 1895 to 1916. He was a foundation member of the Mount Barker Institute. He was a close friend of Sir Lancelot Stirling.

== Family ==
Alfred von Doussa (ca.1848 – 1 August 1926), businessman and politician, was a brother.

Louis von Doussa married Agnes Bowman (ca.1852 – 26 November 1886), daughter of William Bowman, on 16 April 1874; they had seven children, of which only four survived childhood. Agnes did not survive the eighth delivery. He married again on 17 March 1905, to Ruby Louisa Farrar, née Smythe (died 24 January 1920).

- Francis Alfred "Frank" von Doussa (5 February 1875 – 31 October 1928) was manager of the Strathalbyn branch of Elder, Smith & Co
- Stanley Bowman von Doussa (12 September 1877 – 13 November 1952) was a solicitor in Mannum for many years.
- Ethel May von Doussa (10 January 1879 – ?)
- Olive von Doussa (31 October 1882 – ?)

His grandson William Louis von Doussa also qualified as a lawyer.
