= City of Port Pirie =

Former local government area of South Australia

Coordinates: 33°11′09″S 138°01′01″E

Seat of the former City of Port Pirie in South Australia

The City of Port Pirie was a local government area in South Australia from 1876 to 1997, centred on the city of Port Pirie.

It was proclaimed on 28 September 1876 as the Corporate Town of Port Pirie, nearly four years after the town was surveyed. It consisted of two wards (North and South) at its creation, each electing two councillors. It subsequently expanded to four wards: North, South, West and Solomontown. It occupied a room in the Institute building in its early decades as a combined office and council chamber.

The council purchased the buildings of the Institute Committee in 1932, and after substantial renovations, reopened the former institute as the new Port Pirie Town Hall and Municipal Offices. A new building next door was built for the Institute Library next door. Both developments had been funded from the profits of the council's electric works. It also owned a camping ground at Mount Ferguson, following the gift of a former Broken Hill Associated Smelters Camp with funding to resite it to the new location, although this had been leased out by the 1930s. It became the City of Port Pirie with the proclamation of city status on 26 February 1953, becoming the first provincial city in South Australia.

In July 1996, it absorbed the District Council of Pirie, which had surrounded but been separate from the City. The merged municipality subsequently amalgamated with the District Council of Crystal Brook-Redhill to form the Port Pirie Regional Council in March 1997.

== Mayors of Port Pirie ==
- Henry Warren (1876–1879)
- William Wood (1880–1881)
- William Goode (1882–1883)
- J. L. Coombe (1883–1884)
- Fred Grey (1885)
- J. C. Harris (1886)
- T. Magor (1887)
- J. Gordon (1888)
- T. C. Simpson (1888–1890)
- A. A. Pearce (1891–1892)
- Charles Geddes (1893–1894)
- J. C. Haslam (1895–1897)
- G. F. Claridge (1898–1899)
- L. J. Wilcher (1900–1901)
- Fred Grey (1902–1903)
- L. J. Wilcher (1904)
- M. L. Warren (1905)
- M. C. Copinger (1906–1907)
- M. L. Warren (1908–1909)
- William Morrow (1910–1911)
- H. C. Alford (1912–1913)
- C. A. Degenhardt (1913–1914)
- J. S. Geddes (1915–1916)
- A. B. Forgan (1916–1919)
- M. F. Goode (1919)
- J. S. Geddes (1919–1920)
- J. F. Jenkins (1921)
- John Fitzgerald (1922–1923)
- J. S. Geddes (1924)
- John Fitzgerald (1925–1927)
- C. A. Degenhardt (1928–1929)
- Mervyn Merritt Bath Middleton (1930–1931)
- William Threadgold (1932–1946)
- Mervyn Merritt Bath Middleton (1946–1949)
- Charles Davis (1949–1957)
- Henry Boucher (Harry) Welch (1957–1971)
- Ted Connelly (1971–1975)
- John Nykiel (1975–1979)
- William Gordon (Bill) Jones (1979–1989)
- Denis Olley Crisp (1989–1995)
- Kenneth Francis Madigan (1995–1997)
