= District Council of Crystal Brook-Redhill =

Former local government area of South Australia

Coordinates: 33°21′0″S 138°12′0″E

Seat of the former District Council of Crystal Brook-Redhill in South Australia

The District Council of Crystal Brook-Redhill was a local government area in South Australia.

It came into existence on 1 July 1988, as a result of the merger of the District Council of Crystal Brook and District Council of Redhill at the instigation of the two councils. It followed an earlier unsuccessful proposal that would have also involved the District Council of Georgetown joining the merger. The new council had twelve members, representing the seven wards of the two former councils: Town Ward (4 members), Koolunga Ward (2 members), Redhill Ward (2 members), Broughton Extension Ward, East Ward, Napperby Ward and West Wards (1 member each). As of 1995, the district council operated from chambers located in Crystal Brook. It ceased operation on 17 March 1997, when it amalgamated with the City of Port Pirie to form the Port Pirie Regional Council.

Former state MP Ivan Venning was a Crystal Brook-Redhill councillor at its inception.
