= Charles Davis (Australian politician) =

Australian politician

Charles Leonard Davis
- Constituency: Port Pirie

Member of South Australian House of Assembly
- In office 1947–1959
- Preceded by: Andrew Lacey
- Succeeded by: Dave McKee

Mayor of Port Pirie
- In office 1949–1957

Personal details
- Born: 14 February 1884
- Died: 27 January 1959 (aged 74)
- Party: Labor Party
- Occupation: Politician

Charles Leonard Davis (14 February 1884 – 27 January 1959) was an Australian politician. He was the Labor member for Port Pirie in the South Australian House of Assembly from 1947 to 1959.

He had previously been the mayor of the City of Port Pirie from 1949 to 1957.

Parliament of South Australia
Preceded by Andrew Lacey	Member for Port Pirie; 1946–1959	Succeeded by Dave McKee
