= Andrew Lacey =

Australian politician

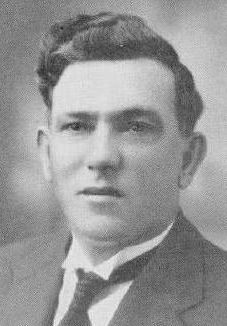
- Andrew Lacey in 1922

Leader of the Opposition in South Australia
- In office 22 April 1933 – 1 April 1938
- Preceded by: Richard Butler
- Succeeded by: Robert Richards

Deputy Leader of the South Australian Labor Party
- In office 1 April 1938 – 4 September 1946
- Leader: Robert Richards
- Preceded by: Robert Richards
- Succeeded by: Mick O'Halloran

Leader of the South Australian Labor Party
- In office 22 April 1933 – 1 April 1938
- Deputy: John Fitzgerald; Robert Richards
- Preceded by: Edgar Dawes
- Succeeded by: Robert Richards

Member of the Australian Parliament for Grey
- In office 16 December 1922 – 19 December 1931
- Preceded by: Alexander Poynton
- Succeeded by: Philip McBride

Personal details
- Born: 19 October 1887 Terowie, South Australia
- Died: 24 August 1946 (aged 58)
- Party: Australian Labor Party (SA)
- Spouse: Helene Clara Welke
- Occupation: Smelter

Andrew William Lacey (19 October 1887 – 24 August 1946) was the 22nd Leader of the Opposition in the Parliament of South Australia from 1933 to 1938, representing the South Australian Branch of the Australian Labor Party. Lacey was previously the Labor member for the seat of Grey in the Australian House of Representatives from 1922 to 1931.

== Early life ==
Of Irish Protestant heritage, Lacey was born in Terowie, South Australia to labourer George Lacey and his wife Mary Ellen, attended the local public school and became one of the area's leading sprinters before commencing work in the Port Pirie smelters.

== Politics ==
Following his marriage to Helene Clara Welke on 13 October 1908, Lacey became increasingly involved in the trade union movement and was employed as the Australian Workers' Union organiser at the smelter from 1916 to 1922. His high profile in the smelters led to his election to Port Pirie Municipal Council in 1920, a position he held until 1922 when he successfully stood as the Labor candidate for the Federal Division of Grey against the incumbent Alexander Poynton, a former Labor member who left the party over conscription in World War I.

As a member of the opposition, Lacey was appointed in 1924 to the select committee investigating the operation of the Navigation Act, and served as a member of the Public Works Committee from 1925. Following the ALP victory at the 1929 election, Lacey was made Chair of the Public Works Committee.

Lacey was unlucky enough to be in government when the Great Depression affected Australia. He was swept out in Labor's heavy defeat at the 1931 election, but remained involved in politics, being re-elected to Port Pirie Municipal Council in 1932 and elected to the South Australian House of Assembly Electoral district of Port Pirie at the 1933 state election.

At this time, the Labor Party was split into three factions; Official Labor, Premiers' Plan Labor and Lang Labor, who all had different plans on combating the Depression. Lacey was leader of Official Labor, the largest Labor faction following the election, and became Leader of the Opposition.

As leader, Lacey advocated nationalising the banks and greater support for the unemployed. Regarded as "an affable people's man", he also played a leading role in reuniting the three factions in 1934 and remained Labor leader until 1938 when he stepped aside to become deputy leader under Robert Richards.

== Death ==
Lacey died of heart disease in 1946. Survived by his wife, two sons and a daughter, Lacey was buried in Centennial Park Cemetery in Adelaide.

Parliament of Australia
Preceded by Alexander Poynton	Member for Grey; 1922–1931	Succeeded by Philip McBride
South Australian House of Assembly
Preceded by Lionel Hill	Member for Port Pirie; 1933–1946; Served alongside: Fitzgerald, Threadgold	Succeeded by Charles Davis
Political offices
Preceded by Richard Layton Butler	Leader of the Opposition of South Australia; 1933–1938	Succeeded by Robert Richards
Party political offices
Preceded by Edgar Dawes	Leader of the Australian Labor Party (South Australian Branch); 1933–1938	Succeeded by Robert Richards
