= Edward William Hawker =

Australian politician

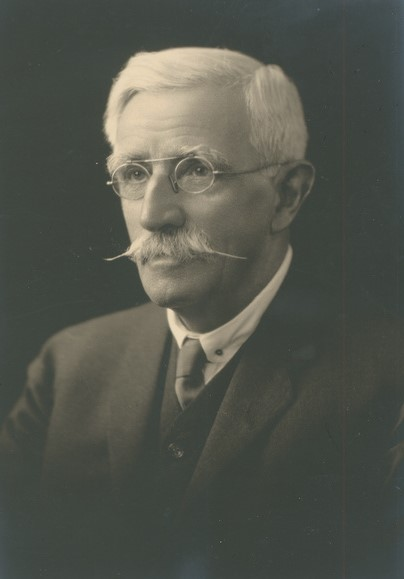

Edward William Hawker (14 January 1850 – 20 September 1940) was a politician in colonial South Australia.

Edward Hawker was the eldest son of George Charles Hawker (1818–1895), MHA for Victoria 1858–1865, 1875–1883, and was born at Bungaree, near Clare, in the hut built by the three Hawker brothers, George, Charles and James, who founded the station. He was educated at St Peter's College, and took his M.L. and M.A. degrees at Cambridge University. He returned to South Australia in 1875 and was admitted to the South Australian Bar in April 1879. He joined in partnership with W. H. Bundey and C. J. Dashwood as "Bundey, Dashwood & Hawker" from 1879 to 1883, then practised alone until 1888.

In 1884 he was elected to the South Australian House of Assembly, representing the electorate of Stanley from April 1884 to May 1889. This was the first time father and son had sat in the House concurrently. He resigned to study mining and metallurgy in Europe. He returned to South Australia in 1892 and was again elected MHA for Stanley, sitting from April 1893 to April 1896. He was for some time lecturer at the School of Mines, then retired to East Bungaree. where he devoted his time to pastoral matters.

== Family ==
Edward married Mary Letitia Stawell (1870 – 3 November 1938), daughter of Sir William Stawell KCMG, on 14 May 1890. Their children included:

- Frances Melian Hawker (12 February 1891 – 7 October 1986) married Richard Blackwood Officer (6 September 1881 – 15 April 1930) on 16 November 1915.
- George Stanley Hawker MC. (7 May 1894 – 17 February 1979) He was MHA for Burra 1947–1956
- Catherine Mary Hawker (5 November 1897 – January 1990) married Richard E. Travers (19 February 1901 – 28 January 1942) on 10 October 1928
- Patience Constance Joan Hawker (28 March 1900 – 9 August 1995) married (Charles) Roy Howard (17 November 1891 – 17 August 1935) on 19 September 1928. She was co-founder of Stawell School near the summit of Mount Lofty. He was a grandson of W. R. Cave.
- William Edward Hawker (31 January 1906– 21 April 1973) married Mary Elizabeth Shipster (12 February 1913-) on 6 December 1939.
