= William Threadgold =

Australian politician

William Herbert Threadgold (c. 1885 - 3 September 1946) was an Australian politician who represented the South Australian House of Assembly multi-member seat of Port Pirie from 1937 to 1938 for the Labor Party.

Civic offices
Preceded by M. M. B. Middleton	Mayor of Port Pirie; 1932–1946	Succeeded by M. M. B. Middleton
Parliament of South Australia
Preceded by John Fitzgerald	Member for Port Pirie; 1937–1938; Served alongside: Andrew Lacey	Succeeded by Andrew Lacey (as single-member seat)
