= Electoral district of Stanley (South Australia) =

Former South Australian state electoral district

Coordinates: 33°11′9″S 138°1′1″E

Stanley South Australia—House of Assembly
- State: South Australia
- Created: 1862
- Abolished: 1956
- Demographic: Rural

Stanley was an electoral district of the House of Assembly in the Australian state of South Australia.

== First incarnation ==
The first incarnation of the electoral district of Stanley was created in 1851 to elect a single member to the unicameral South Australian Legislative Council. The seat was abolished in 1857, with William Younghusband having been the sole member for the duration.

Created by the state's Legislative Council Act of 1851, the extent was formally defined as the entirety of the cadastral County of Gawler (excluding the township of Gawler) and County of Stanley as well as a huge swathe of sparsely settled land to the north, but excluding all of the Eyre and Yorke Peninsulas.

== Second incarnation ==
The second incarnation of the electorate was created by the Electoral Act (No. 20) of the South Australian parliament in 1861 but it was not until the state election of 1862 election that candidates were first elected to represent Stanley. The extent was formally defined as the entirety of the cadastral counties of Gawler and Stanley, the latter being the source of the district name. Thus, at its creation, the electorate stretched from Gulf St Vincent and the Hummocks on the west from Port Gawler up to Redhill, spanning the Adelaide Plains and Mid North to the cadastral counties boundary line in the east – roughly a line passing from Gawler through Stockport and Mintaro to Booborowie.

In the ten years from 1862, the chief polling place was listed as Clare, with subsidiary polling places at Auburn, Mudla Wirra (Gawler), and Baker's Springs (Rhynie).

The Electoral Districts Act (No. 27) in 1872 dramatically changed the boundaries of the district, with the new electoral district of Wooroora being created largely by the excision of Stanley's southernmost half, and the new north western borders for Stanley being significantly extended to include Port Pirie and Port Broughton.

Townships served by the seat of Stanley from 1875 included Port Pirie, Crystal Brook, Clare, Snowtown and Port Broughton.

== Members ==
Two members (1862–1902)
Member	Party	Term	Member	Party	Term
G. S. Kingston		1862–1880	George Young		1862–1865
G. S. Kingston		1862–1880	H. E. Bright		1865–1875
G. S. Kingston		1862–1880	Charles Mann		1875–1881
Alfred Catt		1881–1884	J. H. Howe		1881–1884
E. W. Hawker		1884–1889	John Miller		1884–1885
E. W. Hawker		1884–1889	John Darling Sr.		1885–1887
E. W. Hawker		1884–1889	Charles Kimber		1887–1890
P. P. Gillen		1889–1896	Charles Kimber		1887–1890
P. P. Gillen		1889–1896	John Miller		1890–1893
P. P. Gillen		1889–1896	E. W. Hawker	Defence League	1893–1896
W. P. Cummins		1896–1902	John Miller		1896–1902

Three members (1902–1915)
Member	Party	Term	Member	Party	Term	Member	Party	Term
W. P. Cummins	National League	1902–1906	Alfred Catt		1902–1904	F. W. Young	National League	1902–1905
W. P. Cummins	National League	1902–1906	Alfred Catt	Farmers and Producers	1904–1906	Clarence Goode	Labor	1905–1915
W. P. Cummins	Liberal and Democratic	1906–1907	Harry Jackson	Labor	1906–1915	Clarence Goode	Labor	1905–1915
K. W. Duncan	Farmers and Producers	1907–1910	Harry Jackson	Labor	1906–1915	Clarence Goode	Labor	1905–1915
William Cole	Labor	1910–1915	Harry Jackson	Labor	1906–1915	Clarence Goode	Labor	1905–1915

Two members (1915–1938)
Member	Party	Term	Member	Party	Term
Robert Nicholls	Liberal Union	1915–1923	Henry Barwell	Liberal Union	1915–1923
Robert Nicholls	Liberal Federation	1923–1932	Henry Barwell	Liberal Federation	1923–1925
Robert Nicholls	Liberal Federation	1923–1932	John Lyons	Liberal Federation	1925–1932
Robert Nicholls	Liberal and Country	1932–1938	John Lyons	Liberal and Country	1932–1938

Single-member (1938–1956)
Member	Party	Term
Alexander Melrose	Liberal and Country	1938–1941
Percy Quirke	Labor	1941–1948
Percy Quirke	Independent	1948–1956
