= John Miller (South Australian politician) =

Australian politician (1840–1919)

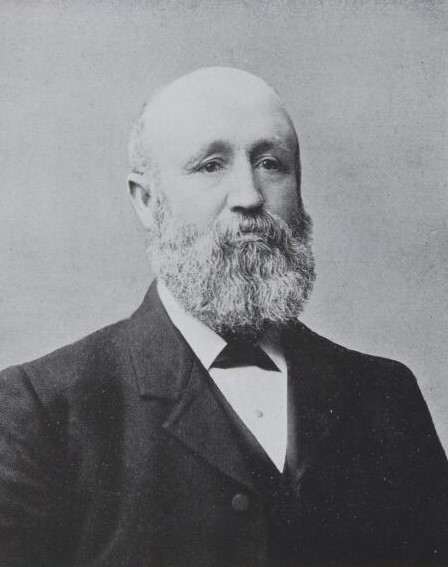

John Miller (12 July 1840 – 22 September 1919) was an Australian politician who represented the South Australian House of Assembly multi-member seat of Stanley from 1884 to 1885, 1890 to 1893 and 1896 to 1902.

Miller was born in Hindmarsh. He was engaged in farming and grazing in the Hundred of Crystal Brook from 1873. He was a member of the Crystal Brook School Board of Advice and a longtime member of the Farmers' Association, serving as president for three years. In 1882 he stood, unsuccessfully, for a seat on the Legislative Council, then stood successfully for Stanley in 1884, but retired a year later for a seat on the Pastoral Board.

He was president of the Advisory Board of Agriculture from 1905 to 1907.
