= Charles Kimber =

Australian politician

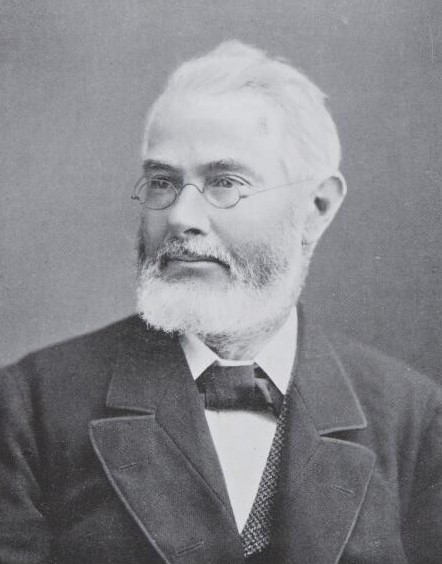

Charles Kimber (15 January 1826 – 29 August 1913) was an orchardist, flour miller and politician in colonial South Australia.

Charles was born in Newbury, Berkshire, and arrived in South Australia on the John Woodhall on 5 January 1849. He began as a storekeeper in Burra, then on Yorke Peninsula, and also tried farming in the vicinity of Mintaro. He moved to the Clare district, planting currant vines, which became a sizeable industry. In 1864 he took over Frederick Hannaford's flour mill in Clare, where the Town Hall was later built. In 1877 he leased it to Alfred Palmer and moved to Kadina to run that mill, returning to Clare in 1881 to run the mill in partnership with his sons Henry and Richard. later largely destroyed by fire. and Riverton, later run by his son, Charles Kimber Jr.

He was at one time Chairman of the Clare District Council, Mayor of Clare, a member of the North Midland Road Board, a member of the Education Board of Advice, and a member of the Clare Licensing Bench.

He was elected to the South Australian House of Assembly seat of Stanley, which he held from April 1887 to April 1890.

He suffered a great deal of pain in his later years, and strangled himself with the string from his pyjamas to end the agony. The corner, J. Bentley, deemed an inquest unnecessary.

== Family ==
Charles Kimber (1826–1913) married Maria Nankervis (c. 1834 – 17 September 1925) on 16 September 1852; their home was "Woodleigh", Clare. Among their children were:

- John Kimber (1854 – 31 October 1893) married (cousin?) Fanny Maria Nankervis (15 July 1854 – 20 November 1941) on 10 June 1878
- Charles Kimber Jr. (2 August 1855 – ) married (cousin?) Mary Jane Bentley (12 December 1856 – 8 March 1896) on 31 October 1878
- Henry Kimber (20 July 1857 – 1943) married Ellen Phillips (1860– ) on 13 October 1880
- Richard Kimber (3 August 1859 – 1947) married Emma Treloar (22 March 1860 – 9 March 1948) on 3 November 1881. His son Arthur Woodleigh Kimber, was a prominent lacrosse player and manager with the Commercial Bank of Australia
- William Kimber (8 April 1863 – 1927) married Flora Eugenia Seppelt (8 October 1874 – 1957) on 8 October 1895. She was a daughter of winemaker Benno Seppelt (1845–1931).
- Maddern Kimber (25 May 1865 – 30 May 1932) married Fanny Johns (c. 1872 – 24 March 1939) on 16 January 1895. He was an orchardist, of "Chatswood", Clare.
- Rosetta Jane "Rose" Kimber (15 August 1867 – 8 June 1935) married William Russell Evans ( – 4 June 1905) on 4 July 1891, lived in Emerald, then Albert Park, Victoria. He was manager of the Bay Excursion Company.

- Evan Charles Russell "Dick" Evans (c. December 1895 – 18 September 1918), was killed in action during World War I.

- Alfred Ernest Kimber (8 August 1869 – 15 July 1958) married Catherine Edith Smith ( – 15 December 1947)
- Edith Maria Kimber (11 November 1871 – ) married Alfred Thomas Roberts (1867–1928) on 19 April 1900, lived in Clare, then Ballidu, Western Australia
- Alice Ruth Kimber (10 January 1874 – ) married Frederick William Wheatley (6 June 1871 – c. 22 March 1928) on 28 June 1896
- James Woodleigh Kimber (21 December 1875 – ) married Edith Maud Lee (1881– ) on 29 May 1907
