= Alfred William Styles =

Australian politician

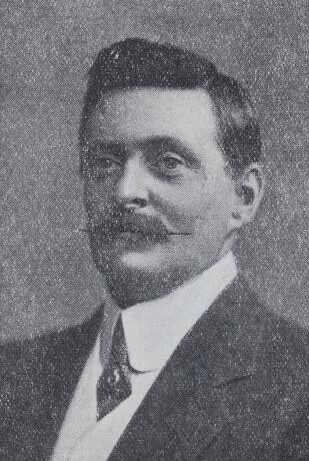

Alfred William Styles (29 November 1873 – 8 January 1926) was an accountant, trade unionist and politician in South Australia.

== History ==
Styles was born in Richmond, Surrey, England, and was a student at the local grammar school, then left for South Australia with his parents, arriving in February, 1882. After an education at the Norwood and Sturt Street State Schools, he was invited by Walter Birks, of Charles Birks & Co., to work for that firm. With Theo. Godlee as a mentor, he rapidly climbed the ladder from office boy to ledger-keeper and assistant cashier. After seven years with that firm he left to take up religious and philanthropic work. He joined the Rev. A. W. Wellington's team of willing workers in feeding and clothing the unemployed during the severe winter of 1892 in a time of economic Depression. He proved so effective that the Rev. Wellington recommended him to the Primitive Methodist Conference of 1894 for theological training for the Methodist ministry. During his training at Way College he had the benefit of private tuition with elocutionist Edward Reeves, and A. Walmsley as singing coach. He was thus well prepared for the annual elocution contest in the Yatala district, and won the first prize trophy in 1895. After four years' probationary work, Styles resigned his position with the church and returned to business life in the bookkeeping department of John Martin's, where both employers and employees were in favour of regulated business hours — "early closing". Styles became a member of the Early Closing Association in July 1900, a member of the board in March 1901, and on 17 June was appointed secretary. He was a hard worker, and devoted all his spare time to association work. The success the campaign, which resulted in shops closing 1 p.m. on Saturdays, instead of 11 p.m. as previously, was largely due to his efforts. He was also a member of the Australasian Federated Butchers Employes' Association, (or Meat Employes' Association), for many years its president, and ten years its secretary, only relinquishing the position in 1915.

== Politics ==
Styles took an active interest in municipal affairs in Thebarton, and was in 1910 the mayor of the town. He was the first mayor to preside over a council which used land value assessment for rating purposes. Styles had been for twenty years a member of trade organisations, and for ten years actively involved with the Labor Party, and after at least one unsuccessful attempts (he had in 1909 contested the Central district vacancy created when A. A. Kirkpatrick was appointed Agent-General in London) entered Parliament as a member of the Legislative Council in 1910, being elected with J. P. Wilson and E. L. W. Klauer for the Central district. He was almost immediately appointed leader of the Labor Opposition in the legislative council, and performed those duties until the Labor Party was returned to power in 1915. For that election the Central district had been split, and Styles was returned with E. L. W. Klauer for Central District No. 2. Labor had a substantial majority in the Assembly, so Crawford Vaughan became premier and Styles was appointed chief secretary in the Vaughan Ministry on 3 April 1915.

He held that position until 14 July 1917, when A. H. Peake was able to form a Liberal Administration by exploiting the breakup of the Labor Party over the conscription issue. Styles was one of those in favor of conscription who broke away to form the Nationalist Party, following Billy Hughes's injunction "Follow me" (and abandon the Labor anti-conscriptionists). A Nationalist-Liberal coalition government was formed in August 1917, and R. P. Blundell, A. W. Styles, and Harry Jackson accepted Ministerial positions as a reward for their cooperation, Styles being appointed Minister of Education, succeeding Sir David Gordon. Styles resigned early in 1918 after Commissioner Webb's Lands Enquiry found he had profited from shady land deals; he contested the Central District seat as an independent against Theodore Bruce, but was unsuccessful. Styles complained that he had been shabbily treated by his party, which failed to support him, and stated that he had not purchased any land except with the full consent of the Cabinet.

== Other interests ==
In his younger days Styles was a fine athlete. He was a foundation members of the West Park Bowling Club, and president for several years before being elected a life member. He was an active Freemason, and during the war was active in patriotic movements. In his later years he operated the Ideal Picture Theatre at Unley, and at the time of his death was a member of the Public Service.

== Family ==
He died after a year suffering ill-health, leaving a widow and a family of eight children (six sons and two daughters), the eldest being only 19 years of age. Their home was "Surreyville", Hughes Street, Mile End.

He had three brothers: Harry, George, and Will Styles, all living in Adelaide.
