= William Cole (Australian politician) =

Australian politician

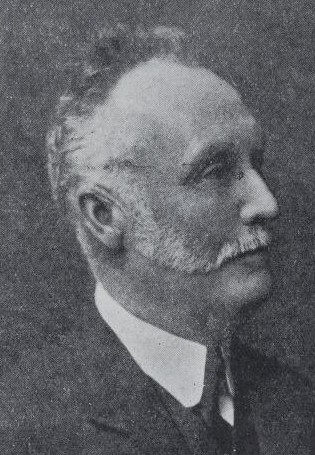

William James Cooper Cole (14 October 1858 – 13 March 1938) was an Australian politician. He was a member of the South Australian House of Assembly from 1910 to 1918, representing the multi-member seats of Stanley (1910–1915) and Port Pirie (1915–1918). He was a member of the United Labor Party until 1917, when he left to join the National Party in the 1917 Labor split.

Cole was born at Williamstown in the Barossa Valley, and was privately educated in Kapunda. He undertook his apprenticeship with the Kapunda Herald (alongside future parliamentary colleague William David Ponder) and The Register newspapers, before working as a printer in Adelaide. He was subsequently editor and proprietor of the Laura Standard for eighteen years from 1896. During his editorship of the Laura Standard, it became the first publication to publish verse by C. J. Dennis. Cole was Mayor of the Corporate Town of Laura from 1904 to 1910. He was also heavily involved in the Methodist church, serving as a lay preacher for 62 years and holding all possible offices in the church.

He was elected to the House of Assembly for the United Labor Party at the 1910 election, representing the electorate of Stanley. Following an electoral redistribution, he was elected unopposed in 1915 for the new seat of Port Pirie. He left the Labor Party for the new National Party in the 1917 Labor split over conscription. He was defeated by a Labor candidate when he ran for re-election at the 1918 election.

After leaving politics, he managed Ponders Advertising Agency in Adelaide until August 1937, when he retired due to failing health.

He was twice married: in 1887 to Alice Johnson (died 1914) and in 1920 to Eva A. Langsford.

Civic offices
Preceded by G. I. Bills	Mayor of Laura; 1904–1910	Succeeded by J. F. Roennfeldt
Parliament of South Australia
Preceded by Kossuth William Duncan	Member for Stanley; 1910–1915; Served alongside: Harry Jackson, Clarence Goode	Succeeded by Henry Barwell; Robert Nicholls
New district	Member for Port Pirie; 1915–1918; Served alongside: Harry Jackson	Succeeded by Lionel Hill; John Fitzgerald
