= William Younghusband =

Australian politician

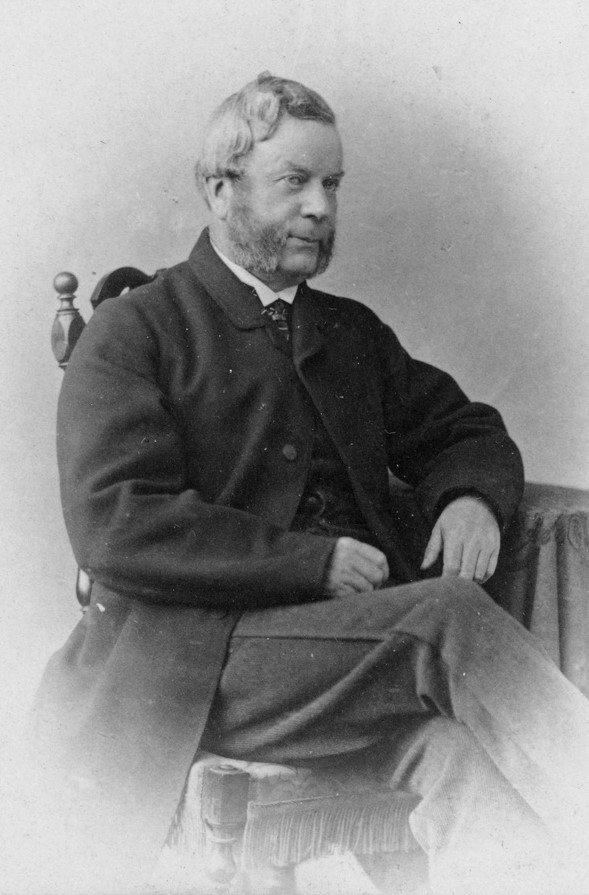
- Born: c. 1814; Whitehaven, Cumberland, England
- Died: 5 May 1863 (aged 49); Rome, Lazio, Italy
- Occupations: Businessman; Politician
- Known for: Murray River Steamboat Navigation Company; Bank of Australasia; Seat on the South Australian Legislative Council
- Spouse: Louisa Cecilia Thomas
- Children: Sarah Younghusband (1837–1885), Louisa Younghusband (1845–82 ), Younghusband (1852 male twins died 1 and 2 days old), Eliza Younghusband (1840–1877) and Amelia Cavanagh (1855–1929)

William Younghusband (1819 – 5 May 1863), sometimes known as "William Younghusband junior", was a businessman and politician in the colony of South Australia; one of the promoters of the Murray River Steam Navigation Company, which enabled Captain Cadell in 1853 to win the £4000 bonus offered by the Government of South Australia for the initiation of steam communication on the Murray.

== Business ==
In 1845, he and George Young founded a woolbroking and shipping business "William Younghusband, jun. & Co.", with offices in Gilbert Street, Adelaide. The company was wound up in 1867.

== Political career ==
Having represented Stanley in the mixed South Australian Legislative Council for five years prior to the inauguration of responsible government in 1856, he was elected to the new Legislative Council, and was Chief Secretary in the Hanson Government from September 1857 to May 1860. This being the first stable administration formed subsequent to the disappearance of the old officials from public life, it fell to Mr. Younghusband to organise the various Government departments inaugurated under the new régime. This he did with consummate ability, and for many years the public business of the colony was transacted on the lines he laid down. Mr. Younghusband was a director of the Bank of Australasia, and retired from the Legislative Council by rotation in Feb. 1861. He died at Rome on 5 May 1863.

== Legacy ==
Younghusband Peninsula and the small town Younghusband on the River Murray are named after him.

Parliament of South Australia
Preceded by Thomas O'Halloran; Charles Sturt; Henry Young	Member of the South Australian Legislative Council; 1851 – 1861; Served alongside: Multiple Members	Succeeded by John Barrow; William Peacock; Judah Solomon
Political offices
Preceded by Robert Torrens	Chief Secretary of South Australia; 1857 – 1860	Succeeded by George Waterhouse
