= Thomas Pascoe (politician) =

Australian farmer and politician

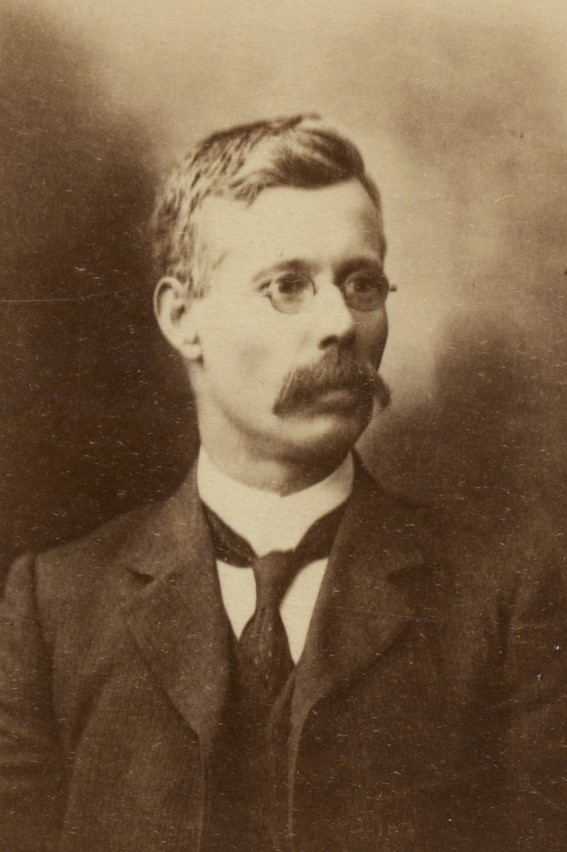

Member of the South Australian Legislative Council
- In office 19 May 1900 – 28 February 1933
- Constituency: North-Eastern District (to 1908); Midland District (from 1908)

Personal details
- Born: 23 June 1859
- Died: 23 February 1939 (aged 79)
- Party: Liberal Union (1910-1923); Liberal Federation (1923-1932); Liberal and Country League (1932-1933)

Thomas Pascoe (23 June 1859 – 23 February 1939) was a wheat grower and politician in South Australia. He was a member of the South Australian Legislative Council from 1900 to 1933, representing the North-Eastern District and its successor the Midland District. He was a minister in the governments of Archibald Peake and Henry Barwell, holding responsibilities for agriculture, education and mining, and eventually being promoted to Chief Secretary in the last months of the Barwell government.

== History ==
Pascoe was born at White Hut (part of the locality of Stanley Flat since 2001), near Clare, the second son of Thomas Pascoe, Sr. (1836 – 1 March 1918) and his wife Fanny Pascoe, née Roach. His father, who arrived in South Australia on the Abberton from Crowan, Cornwall in 1848 with his parents and siblings, worked at the Burra mines, married at Penwortham in 1852, made several valuable finds at the Forest Creek gold diggings and established Angle Farm at White Hut and another at Terowie.

Thomas Pascoe, Jr., who may have been educated at Stanley Grammar School, Watervale, and took over management of the Terowie farm (his brother Paul Roach Pascoe ran the White Hut farm) and became a considerable authority on wheat growing. He spent a couple of years farming and mining in Western Australia, but otherwise his whole life was spent in South Australia.

In retirement he lived at 101 First Avenue, Joslin.

== Politics ==
He served on the District Council of Terowie before being elected to the Legislative Council by the electors of the North-East (later Midland) district for the Liberal Party. He retained the seat unopposed for 32 years.

He held several Ministerial positions, and for a short time was Acting Premier when Sir Henry Barwell visited Melbourne in 1923. When the Peake-Butler Ministry was formed in December, 1909, Pascoe was made Minister of Agriculture, and in the Liberal Government of 1912 he held the portfolio of Minister of Agriculture and Irrigation. He was Minister of Irrigation and Minister of Mines. In 1923 he was appointed Commissioner of Public Works, and on the death of Sir John George Bice acted as Chief Secretary under Sir Henry Barwell.

He travelled to every State in the Commonwealth exchanging knowledge regarding the cultivation of wheat, and attended many conferences called by Ministers of Agriculture in the various State Governments.

== Family ==
Paul Roach Pascoe (died 16 September 1944), Francis Pascoe (1856–1935), Sydney journalist, and John Pascoe, Melbourne journalist, were brothers.

He married Florence Eliza Rayner (died 4 October 1953) of Canowie on 28 July 1886. Among their children were:

- A son M. Pascoe, ran Booyoolie Station, Gladstone
- A daughter married Norman D. Richardson of Strathalbyn

== See also ==
- Hundred of Pascoe

Political offices
Preceded by William Hague	Commissioner of Public Works; 1922 – 1923	Succeeded by George Jenkins
