= William Patrick Cummins =

Australian politician

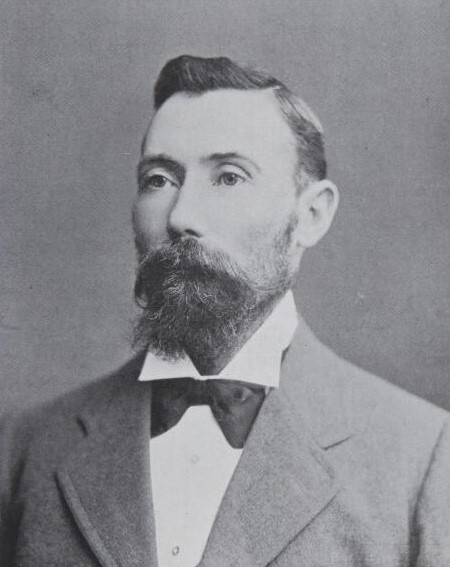
William Patrick Cummins

William Patrick Cummins (12 April 1855 – 9 March 1907) was an Australian politician who represented the South Australian House of Assembly multi-member seat of Stanley from 1896 to 1907, representing the Australasian National League from 1902 to 1906, then the Liberal and Democratic Union from 1906 to 1907.
