= Ern Klauer =

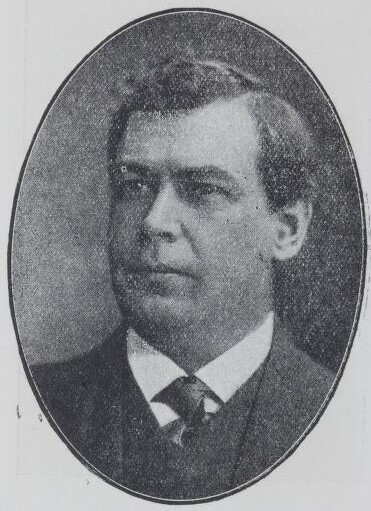

Ernest Leopold William Klauer (1870 – 6 August 1915) was an engineer, trade unionist and politician in South Australia.

== History ==
Ernest Klauer was born in Adelaide in 1870; his father, (Friedrich Wilhelm) August Klauer, born in Aschersleben, Germany and naturalized as a British subject in South Australia in 1874, was the proprietor of the White Hart Hotel in Hindley Street. Ernest was educated at the Grote Street Public School, then at an early age served an apprenticeship as fitter and turner at the Islington Railway Workshops of the South Australian Railways, and remained in the Government service for more than 22 years.

At an early age he took an active interest in the trade union movement, and became a prominent member of the Railway Association. In 1897 he was elected chairman of their Adelaide branch, and was instrumental in the formation of the Chemical Fertilisers Union, and became their president in 1911. He helped form the Australasian Society of Engineers in South Australia, and from a very small base built it up into a strong and vibrant organisation, and was elected its president in 1909. Two years later he took over the secretarial work, and held that office until ill-health forced him to retire. He was elected president of their Federal body in 1913. In 1912 he was elected president of the Musicians' Union, which also advanced strongly under his guidance. He was also a prominent worker for the Labor Party, and was its vice-president in 1909 and 1910, carrying out his duties with conspicuous ability. At the following annual State Labor Conference he was elected president by a large majority. In the following year he won a Central district seat on the Legislative Council for the Labor Party, and was returned to that in January 1912. Klauer had a great knowledge of factors affecting the liquor trade, and he took up the cudgels on its behalf. He was a member of the Wharfs Commission, and also of the Break-of-gauge Commission. He was a member of the Electoral Commission, and though seriously indisposed, he attended the early meetings and was anxious to perform his duties as a member of that committee, but was beaten by the illness that killed him.

He was noted for his oratory skills. An obituary in the Daily Herald called him "forceful and convincing as a speaker" and noted he was "well respected" by members of both the Liberal and Labor parties.

== Other interests ==
He was involved in municipal affairs, and for four years served as councillor and two years as alderman for the Thebarton Council.

He was a strong oarsman, and a member of the champion "four" of the Commercial Rowing Club for two years, and in the champion "eight" of that club for a similar period. He was powerful swimmer, particularly in breast stroke.

== Family ==
He married Christabelle Keys, lived at "Reualk", Clifford Street, Torrensville. They had one child, Lyle Stanley Durrant "Stan" Klauer (born c. January 1896), who was killed in action in France on 4 September 1918."enlistment form: Lyle Stanley Durrant Klauer". National Archives of Australia. 21 July 1915.
