= Frederick Samuel Wallis =

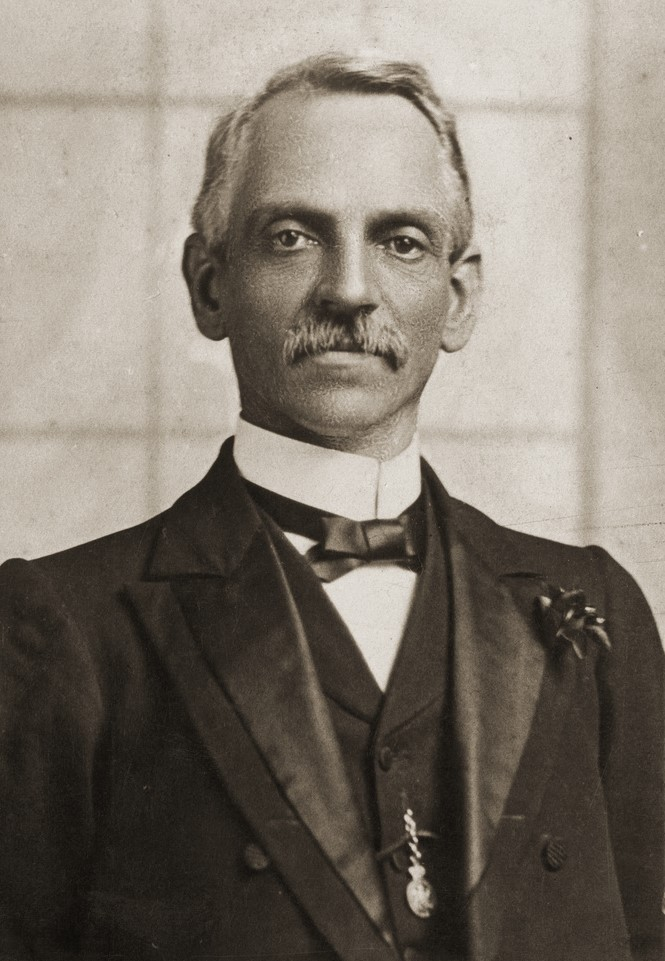

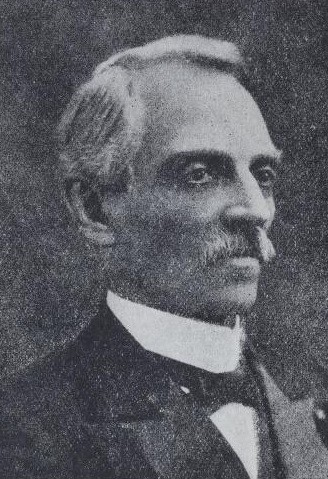

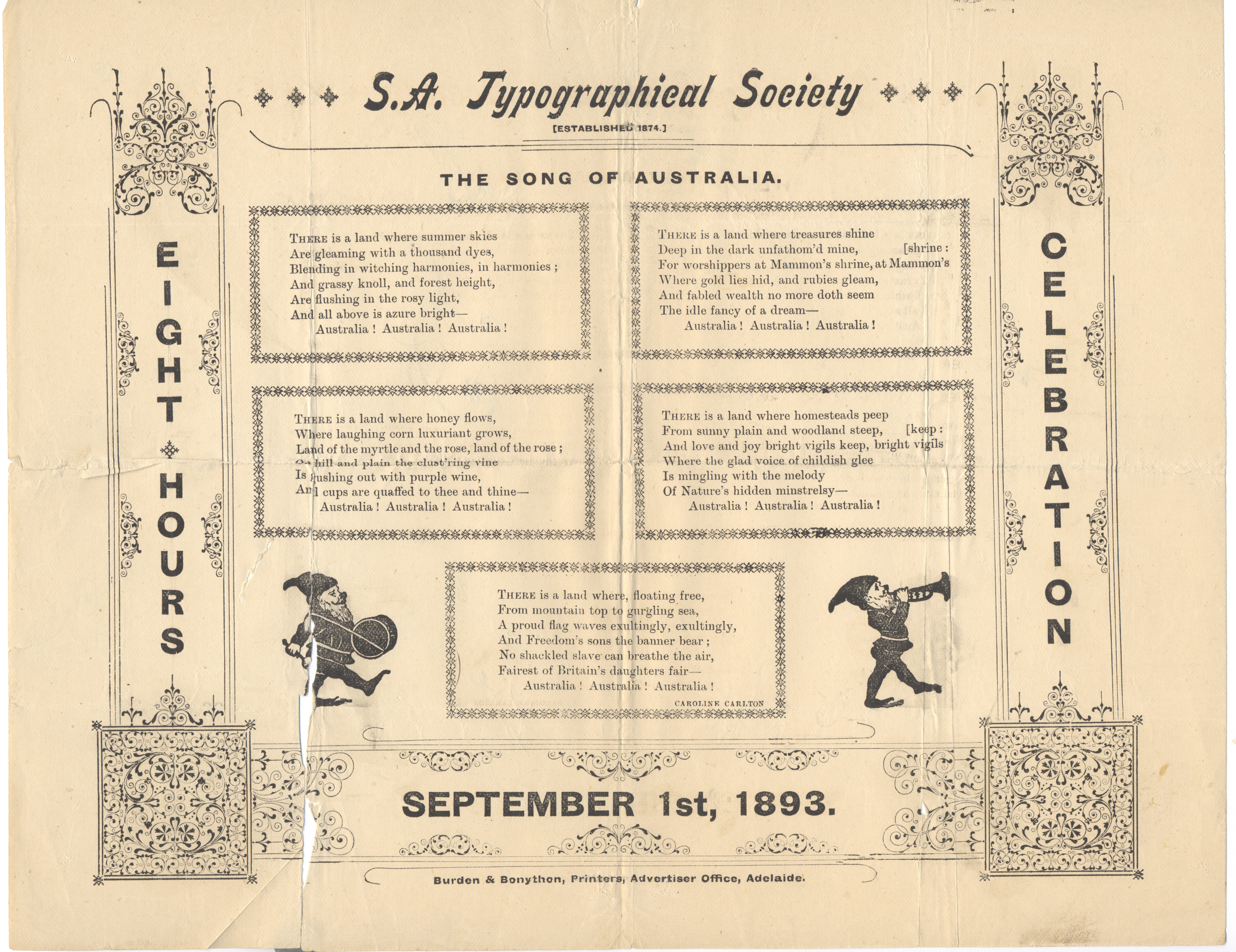
S.A. Typographical Society Eight Hour Celebration Ephemera of Caroline Carlton's The Australia Song September 1st 1893.

Frederick Samuel Wallis (22 November 1857 – 13 November 1939) was a trade unionist and politician in the state of South Australia.

== History ==
Wallis was born at Macclesfield, a son of Richard Wallis (1826 – 21 December 1897), who was for some time connected with H. B. Hanton's jam-making business at Fullarton (later taken over by D. & J. Fowler to become the Lion Preserving Company), Kensington, and the East End Markets. In 1863 his parents moved to Norwood, and Frederick began his schooling under James Cowell, later under Thomas Caterer. (Kent Town in 1883, Victoria street, Goodwood West in 1897).

== Employment and union activity ==
He began his apprenticeship in the printing trade in 1872, and on completing his indentures joined the South Australian Register as a compositor, simultaneously becoming a member of the Typographical Society (later S.A. Branch of the Printing Industry Employes' Union of Australia).

He was elected father of the Register "chapel" (workplace union branch) in 1884, and left the compositor's frame to take up the position of reader and in the same year was elected president of the Typographical Society.

In 1886, he represented the Typographical Society at the Fourth Intercolonial Trade Union Congress, held at Adelaide. He was, with Andrew Kirkpatrick, a delegate to the second triennial meeting of the Australasian Typographical Union, held in Melbourne. In 1887 he was elected Secretary of the Society, an office he retained for 22 years. His employment with the Register was abruptly terminated in 1888 for his part in a printers' strike. He had recently become a delegate to the Trades and Labour Council and in 1891, as an executive officer of his Society, took part in forming the Legislative Council Elections Committee, which developed into the United Labor Party. In 1892 he represented the printing trade employees before the Shops and Factories Commission and was one of his Society's delegates to the fourth triennial meeting of the Australasian Typographical Union, which was held in Adelaide. He became President of the Trades and Labor Council in 1896, its trustee on the Trades Hall, chairman of the managing committee, and editor of the Trades Hall Review. He became secretary of the Trades and Labor Council in 1897 on the death of John McPherson and held that office for 12 years. For part of the nineties he was employed at The Advertiser. He was involved in the Society's production Centenary History of South Australia.

== Parliament ==
In 1907 he was elected to the Legislative Council on the franchise question and two years later succeeded Kirkpatrick, who had been appointed Agent-General, as Chief Secretary and Minister of Industry in the Price-Peake administration, which came to an end with the death of the Premier of South Australia two months later. Labor won the 1910 election and John Verran became Premier, Wallis was again appointed Chief Secretary. After the dissolution in 1912, Wallis retained his seat on the Legislative Council, leading the Opposition until July 1913.

In the 1917 Labor split, he dissented from the official Labor line on conscription, but adamantly refused to join the rebel National Party. He was nonetheless expelled from the Labor Party in September 1918, for what he blamed on his refusal to sign a particular pledge, but was also attributed to his public opposition to Labor demands around conscription. He served out his term as an independent and ran for re-election in 1921 as an "old-style Labor" candidate, but was soundly defeated. In 1926, he was ruled to be ineligible to be a delegate of the Labor Party and removed as a trustee of Trades Hall as a result of his 1921 campaign.

From 1915 to 1921, he was Parliamentary representative on the Council of the University of Adelaide. He also held office on two Royal Commissions and several Select Committees,

He never lost his interest in politics. He was a frequent visitor to the parliamentary library, and until four days before his death, a regular "listener" in the Assembly gallery; he was there on the historic day 9 November 1939 when for the first time in 41 years the House had to rise because a quorum could not be obtained. Upon his death, he was accorded a state funeral.

== Other interests ==
For more than 20 years he assisted in the administration of soldiers relief funds.

In 1885 he took part in the formation of the South Australian branch of the Geographical Society. He and Sir Langdon Bonython (died October 1939) were its last two surviving foundation members.

In 1878, Mr. Wallis became a valued member of the Unitarian Church in Wakefield Street.

For some years Mr. Wallis was a member of the Hospital Board under the chairmanship of W. G. Coombs. He was chairman of the committee of the Mayor's Patriotic Fund in 1913. When the South Australian Soldiers' Fund was formed, Mr. Wallis was placed on it and held various important positions ! for the 23 years of the funds' existence. Mr. Wallis was also associated with other patriotic organisations during the war. He was a member of the council of the Boy Scouts' Association and of the board of management of the Royal Institution for the Blind, vice-president of the League of Empire, member of the Poetry Society and the Shakespeare Society, and a life member of the Dual Club. He was a Justice of the Peace for 35 years.

He was a lifelong abstainer, a non-smoker and was unmarried. He was accorded a State funeral by the Premier, Thomas Playford.

== Family ==
Wallis never married. His brothers and sisters included:

- Arthur Bernard Wallis, of Meekatharra, Western Australia
- Martha Elizabeth Wallis married Frederick Archer Box on 26 March 1883
- (Edith) Ellen "Nellie" Wallis married Alexander Swann on 23 March 1899; lived at 17 Myall Avenue, Kensington Gardens
- Alice Mary Wallis married Frederick Archer Box on 30 October 1897; lived at North Unley
