= Arthur Addison =

Australian politician

The Honourable Arthur Addison
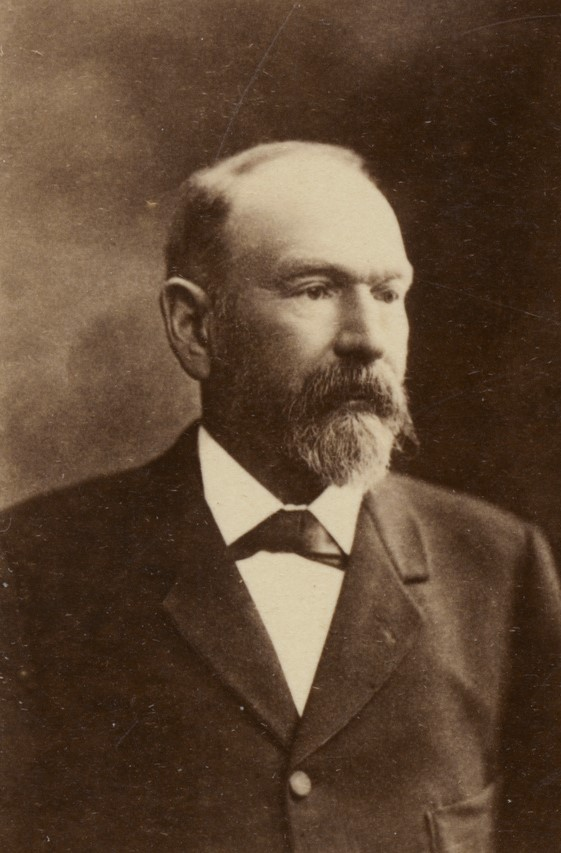

Member of the South Australian Parliament for Northern District
- In office 11 Jul 1888 – 29 Jul 1915

Minister without Portfolio
- In office 5 Jun 1909 – 22 Dec 1909

Personal details
- Born: 17 May 1842 Adelaide, South Australia
- Died: 29 July 1915 (aged 73) Orroroo, South Australia
- Profession: Bank Manager & Milliner
- Website: SA Parliament Biography

Arthur Richman Addison (17 May 1842 – 29 July 1915) was an Australian politician who served as the Chairman of the Encounter Bay District Council and later as a Member of the South Australian Legislative Council from 1888 until his death in 1915.

== Early life and career ==
Addison was born in Adelaide on 17 May 1842. His parents, Thomas Plummer Addison and Eliza, arrived in South Australia aboard the Pestonjee Bomanjee, during October 1838. Thomas served for many years as deputy collector of Customs of South Australia.

He was educated at St Peter's College, and on leaving found employment with Younghusband and Cadell's River Murray Navigation Company. After three years he worked for the National Bank, then four years with the Bank of South Australia, mostly at the bank's Port Elliot branch.

He next went into business with William Bowman, setting up a flour milling business at Middleton, which proved highly profitable. He later settled in Orroroo, where, in partnership with Edward Trussell, he founded another milling business with which he was associated for the remainder of his life.

== Politics ==
While at Port Elliot, Addison was involved with the district council, and served as chairman for much of that time. He succeeded Thomas Playford as chairman of the district councils of South Australia. He was the inaugural chairman of the District Council of Orroroo from 1888 to 1890. He then entered South Australian politics, serving as a member of the South Australian Legislative Council for the Northern District from 1888 to 1915. For six months in 1909 he was a minister without portfolio. In 1903 he was offered the post of Chief Secretary in the Kingston government, but declined the honor.

== Other interests ==
He was an active member of the Church of England, and at Orroroo conducted a great number of services as lay reader.

He was a great sportsman, and a member of Tattersall's Club. He owned a number of thoroughbred horses, one in particular, Vistula, which won the ARC Grand National Hurdles in 1891 and the Great Eastern Steeplechase at Oakbank in 1892. He took a great interest in the Volunteer Militia, and rose to the rank of Captain with the Orroroo Volunteer Force, and later captained the Orroroo Defence Rifle Club, and won many trophies for marksmanship.

== Family ==
He was twice married. His first wife, Elizabeth Bowman (c. 1849 – 12 January 1889), was a daughter of his partner William Bowman. They married on 12 May 1870 and had nine children. Arthur married again in 1893, to Adelaide Williams.

A son, Walter Colman Addison (died 18 July 1951), was a champion target rifle shooter, winning the King's Prize at Bisley in 1907. He married Gertrude Madeleine Woods (19 Oct 1872 – ), daughter of E. J. Woods, on 8 May 1900. Their son Gerald Bowman Addison (died 1994) was also a noted marksman.

Harold Mayo Addison (c. 1847 – 14 June 1941), first chairman of trustees of the Savings Bank of South Australia, was a brother. He married Meta Louise Nixon, née Pelzer, (his second wife, died 8 January 1934) on 1 March 1904 after considerable publicity, she having been the subject of attempted murder by her first husband.
