= Harry Jackson (politician) =

Australian politician

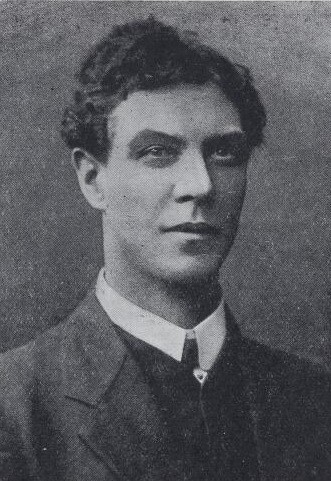

7th Speaker of the South Australian House of Assembly
- In office 17 November 1911 – 5 April 1918
- Preceded by: Jenkin Coles
- Succeeded by: Laurence O'Loughlin

Personal details
- Born: Henry John Jackson; 23 July 1873 Croydon, London; United Kingdom
- Died: 1 July 1951 Royal Adelaide Hospital, Adelaide; South Australia
- Party: United Labor Party (1906-1915); National Party (from 1917)
- Website: Former Member Page

Harry Jackson (born Henry John Jackson 23 July 1873 – 1 July 1951) was an Australian politician who represented the South Australian House of Assembly seats of Stanley from 1906 to 1915 and Port Pirie from 1915 to 1918. He represented the United Labor Party until the 1917 Labor split, when he was expelled and joined the splinter National Party. He served as Speaker of the South Australian House of Assembly from 1911 to 1912.

Jackson was born at Croydon in England, and migrated to Australia in 1893. Prior to entering politics, he worked in the smelters at Port Pirie. He was involved a number of labour organisations at Port Pirie, was a member of the local hospital committee, and served on the Corporate Town of Port Pirie council for two years.

He was elected to the House of Assembly for the United Labor Party at the 1906 state election, following an unsuccessful candidacy in 1905. He became chairman of committees following the 1910 election. On 17 November 1911, he replaced conservative Jenkin Coles as Speaker of the House; he would hold the role until the defeat of the Verran Labor government at the 1912 election. He was re-elected in the Stanley electorate in 1910 and 1912, and after an electoral redistribution in 1915 shifted, unopposed, to the electorate of Port Pirie.

Labor returned to government under Crawford Vaughan in 1915, and Jackson was appointed Commissioner for Public Works in the Vaughan ministry. Along with the rest of the Cabinet, Jackson left the Labor Party for the new National Party in the 1917 Labor split over conscription. The ministry initially continued in minority government, but was ousted by the opposition Liberal Union in July. The National Party became the junior coalition partner in the new Liberal ministry under Archibald Peake, and Jackson was appointed Commissioner of Crown Lands and Immigration. However, he was defeated by a Labor candidate at the 1918 election.

After leaving politics, he was manager of the coal gantries at Port Pirie. He was subsequently chairman of the South Australian Fire Brigade Board for twenty years, and was chairman of the Tattersalls Club from 1940, holding both roles until his death.

Jackson died in the Royal Adelaide Hospital in 1951 at the age of 74; his family declined a state funeral, and he was buried at Centennial Park Cemetery. Upon his death, the Tattersalls Club renamed their main horse race the "Harry Jackson Handicap" in his honour. He was survived by his wife, one son, and a granddaughter; a second son had died in an accident at the age of 11.

Political offices
Preceded by George Ritchie	Commissioner of Public Works; 1915 – 1917	Succeeded by John Bice
South Australian House of Assembly
Preceded by Jenkin Coles	Speaker of the South Australian House of Assembly; 1911–1912	Succeeded by Laurence O'Loughlin
