= Electoral results for the district of Newcastle (South Australia) =

South Australian district election results

This is a list of election results for the electoral district of Newcastle in South Australian elections.

== Members for Newcastle ==
First incarnation (1884–1902)
Member	Party	Term	Member	Party	Term
Thomas Burgoyne		1884–1902	Patrick Coglin		1884–1887
Thomas Burgoyne		1884–1902	Thomas Playford		1887–1890
Thomas Burgoyne		1884–1902	Joseph Hancock		1890–1893
Thomas Burgoyne		1884–1902	Richard Foster		1893–1902

Second incarnation (1915–1938)
Member	Party	Term	Member	Party	Term
Andrew Kirkpatrick	Labor	1915–1918	Thomas Butterfield	Labor	1915–1917
Andrew Kirkpatrick	Labor	1915–1918	Edward Twopeny	Liberal Union	1917–1918
William Harvey	Labor	1918–1931	Thomas Butterfield	Labor	1918–1931
William Harvey	Parliamentary Labor	1931–1933	Thomas Butterfield	Parliamentary Labor	1931–1933
James Beerworth	Labor	1933–1938	Lindsay Riches	Labor	1933–1938

Single-member (1938–1956)
Member	Party	Term
George Jenkins	Liberal and Country	1938–1956

== Election results ==
=== Elections in the 1950s ===
1953 South Australian state election: Newcastle
Party	Candidate	Votes	%	±%
Liberal and Country	George Jenkins	2,275	63.7	−7.6
Labor	Gerald Travers	1,298	36.3	+7.6
Total formal votes		3,573	97.4	−1.5
Informal votes		96	2.6	+1.5
Turnout		3,669	92.0	+5.9
Liberal and Country hold		Swing	−7.6	

1950 South Australian state election: Newcastle
Party	Candidate	Votes	%	±%
Liberal and Country	George Jenkins	2,601	71.3	−28.7
Labor	Leonard Pilton	1,048	28.7	+28.7
Total formal votes		3,649	98.9	
Informal votes		40	1.1	
Turnout		3,689	86.1	
Liberal and Country hold		Swing	N/A	

=== Elections in the 1940s ===
1947 South Australian state election: Newcastle
Party	Candidate	Votes	%	±%
Liberal and Country	George Jenkins	unopposed		
Liberal and Country hold		Swing		

1944 South Australian state election: Newcastle
Party	Candidate	Votes	%	±%
Liberal and Country	George Jenkins	2,229	60.0	−40.0
Labor	Jock Pick	1,486	40.0	+40.0
Total formal votes		3,715	97.8	
Informal votes		84	2.2	
Turnout		3,799	83.3	
Liberal and Country hold		Swing	N/A	

1941 South Australian state election: Newcastle
Party	Candidate	Votes	%	±%
Liberal and Country	George Jenkins	unopposed		
Liberal and Country hold		Swing		

=== Elections in the 1930s ===
1938 South Australian state election: Newcastle
Party	Candidate	Votes	%	±%
Liberal and Country	George Jenkins	2,060	67.5	
Labor	James Marner	993	32.5	
Total formal votes		3,053	97.8	
Informal votes		68	2.2	
Turnout		3,121	64.7	
Liberal and Country hold		Swing		
