= Lindsay Riches =

Australian politician (1904–1972)

Lindsay Gordon Riches, CMG (18 February 1904 – 7 June 1972) was a South Australian politician. He was a Labor Party member of the South Australian House of Assembly from 1933 to 1970, representing the electorates of Newcastle (1933-1938) and Stuart (1938-1970). He was Speaker of the South Australian House of Assembly from 1965 to 1968 under Frank Walsh and Don Dunstan. He was also a long-time mayor of the City of Port Augusta from 1936 to 1970, with Port Augusta gaining city status during his tenure.

He was born at Mundalla, near Tatiara, and was educated at Bordertown Public School. He worked as a compositor for the Border Chronicle newspaper at Bordertown for seven years after leaving school, working for former state Labor MP Donald Campbell. He moved to Port Augusta to work for the Transcontinental in 1924, and took over the operation of that newspaper in 1927, serving as editor.

== Honours ==
He was appointed CMG on 1 January 1967 and C.St.J. on 8 January 1970.

Parliament of South Australia
Preceded by Thomas Butterfield; William Harvey	Member for Newcastle; 1933–1938; Served alongside: James Beerworth	Succeeded by George Jenkins (as single-member seat)
New district	Member for Stuart; 1938–1970	Succeeded by Gavin Keneally
Preceded by Tom Stott	Speaker of the South Australian House of Assembly; 1965–1968	Succeeded by Tom Stott
Civic offices
Preceded by James Beerworth	Mayor of Port Augusta; 1936–1970	Succeeded by W. I. C. Howard
