= Custon Conservation Park =

Conservation park in South Australia

- IUCN category III (natural monument or feature)
- Location within South Australia
- Location: South Australia
- Nearest city: Wolseley
- Coordinates: 36.4408°S 140.9268°E
- Area: 64 ha (160 acres)
- Established: 8 March 2007
- Governing body: Department for Environment and Water

Custon Conservation Park is a protected area in the Australian state of South Australia located in the state's Limestone Coast in the gazetted locality of Custon about 8 kilometres (5.0 mi) south of the town centre in Wolseley and about 20 kilometres (12 mi) south of the municipal seat of Bordertown.

The conservation park occupies land in the Section 903 and Allotment 2 in Deposited Plan 36724 of the cadastral unit of the Hundred of Tatiara. It is bounded by Bangham Road on its western side and by Pier Point Road on its northern side.

The land originally gained protected area status in 2007, when crown land in section 903 was gazetted as the Custon Conservation Park and was enlarged in 2016 by the addition of Crown land in the Allotment 2 in Deposited Plan 36724.

The conservation park contains an “ecological community” consisting of “a grassy woodland” of grey box which is listed as "Endangered" under the state's National Parks and Wildlife Act 1972 with buloke being a "co-dominant tree species”. As of 2014, the Government of South Australia has been using fire as “part of an integrated management strategy to maintain the Grey-box Grassy Woodland association”.

The conservation park is classified as an IUCN Category III protected area.
