= District Council of Wirrega =

Former local government in South Australia

Coordinates: 36°18′41″S 140°46′25″E

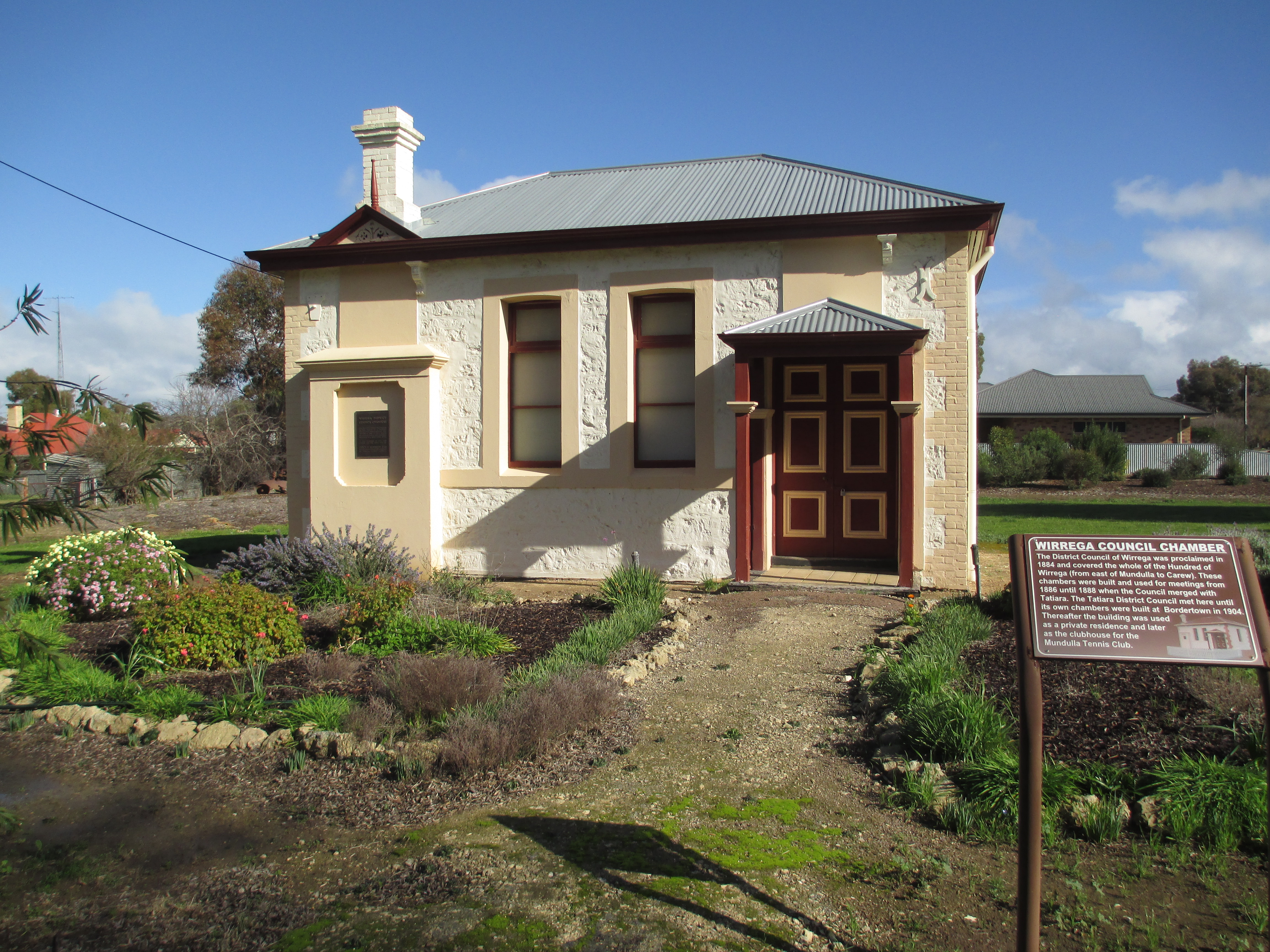
Former Wirrega council chambers photographed 2016

The District Council of Wirrega was a short-lived local government area in South Australia in existence from 1884 to 1888.

The introduction of local government to the Mallee region in the 1870s had been the subject of significant local conflict among the residents of the Hundreds of Wirrega and Tatiara, which would be described in 1880 as "at present...the only agricultural settlements in the South Australian mallee country". Some residents of both the Hundred of Wirrega and the Hundred of Tatiara had petitioned for their own District Councils in 1875, while others had protested against the creation of a council at all, stating that the area was "too small and scattered". Another local group, among them local MP Friedrich Krichauff, argued that a united District Council should be created to cover both hundreds, as they were too small to sustain their own and a larger municipality would be cheaper. The advocates of the united council were successful, and the District Council of Tatiara was created in 1876.

In 1884, there was a renewed push for a separate council at Wirrega, with residents citing the state of local roads and the administration of vermin destruction laws among their reasons for wishing to secede. Unlike in 1875, the renewed push met with success, and the District Council of Wirrega was proclaimed on 31 July 1884. The boundaries of the new municipality were stated to comprise "the whole of the Hundred of Wirrega, bounded as follows; commencing at the north-west corner of the Hundred of Tatiara; thence west by the production of the north boundary of said hundred for 16 miles 1,655 links; thence true south to the north boundary of County MacDonnell, thence east along said boundary to the south-west corner of the Hundred of Tatiara, and north along the west boundary of said hundred to the point of commencement." A site for a council chamber in Mundulla was proclaimed in 1885, and the Wirrega Council Chambers opened on 1 June 1886.

The separate Wirrega municipality was to be short-lived. In 1887, local government in South Australia underwent a major consolidation, which became the District Councils Act 1887. The District Council of Wirrega was merged back into the District Council of Tatiara, which also underwent a further expansion into surrounding lands. Two local state MPs, Andrew Dods Handyside and Beaumont Arnold Moulden, opposed the merger, suggesting instead that portions of surrounding townships be merged into Wirrega, and that recent improvements in the district would be lost if "the district were to lose its individuality". Moulden and Handyside were unsuccessful, and Wirrega was merged into the District Council of Tatiara when the Act was gazetted on 5 January 1888. The former municipality became the Mundulla and Buckingham wards of the Tatiara council.

The former council chambers were used by the District Council of Tatiara from 1888 until 1904, when the municipality built new chambers at Bordertown. After the council moved to Bordertown, the building was used for many years by the Mundulla Tennis Club. It was restored in 1973, and now houses historic local photographs. A commemorative council meeting was held in the building in 1986, and it was listed on the South Australian Heritage Register on 21 October 1993.

In 1916, a number of Tatiara councillors proposed the secession of Wirrega to form a new District Council of Wirrega, consisting of the Hundreds of Wirrega, Parsons and Pflaum. They claimed the larger council was unwieldy and that road grants were not properly proportioned among the wards, and presented a petition of ratepayers in support. While the Commissioner of Crown Lands at the time stated that he would give their request "favourable consideration", it was not recreated.

== Chairmen ==
- John Kennedy (1884–1885)
- Rice Hood (1885–1887)
- E. J. Barrett (1887)
- John Kennedy (1887–1888)
