= Pine Hill Soak Conservation Park =

Protected area in South Australia

- IUCN category III (natural monument or feature)
- Location within South Australia
- Location: South Australia
- Nearest city: Bordertown
- Coordinates: 36.5442°S 140.8924°E
- Area: 51 ha (130 acres)
- Established: 17 September 1987
- Visitors: ‘low’ (in 1992)
- Governing body: Department for Environment and Water

Pine Hill Soak Conservation Park is a protected area in the Australian state of South Australia located in the state's Limestone Coast in the gazetted locality of Bangham about 30 kilometres (19 mi) south of the town centre in Bordertown.

The conservation park occupies land in section 67 of the cadastral unit of the Hundred of Geegeela on the eastern side of Frances Road. It is bounded by McCarthy Road to the north and by a vehicle track to its east and south boundaries. Land adjoining its south-west boundary is gazetted as a recreation reserve and contains a hall called the Bangham Hall and some tennis courts. Its name is derived from a soak known as Pine Hill Soak which is located near the conservation park's southern boundary.

The conservation park was proclaimed on 17 September 1987. As of 2012, access to the conservation park for the purpose of petroleum exploration under the Petroleum and Geothermal Energy Act 2000 was not permitted.

In 1992, the conservation park was described as follows. The land contains a field of "relict sand dunes and associated swale depressions". The former landform supported a brown stringybark "open forest" with desert banksia being the "dominant shrub species" while the latter landform supported a "woodland of river red gum … and South Australian blue gum … with an open understorey of grasses, sedges and herbs". The conservation park contains native pine which is "an occurrence close to the southern limit of this species' distribution" and which was considered as "suitable habitat" for the red-tailed black cockatoo - a species considered to be "threatened" at the time and which is "dependent on brown stringybark for food and nesting resources". Further, visitation to the conservation park was described as "low".

The conservation park is classified as an IUCN Category III protected area.

== See also ==
- Protected areas of South Australia
