= Bangham =

Bangham may refer to:

== People ==
- Alec Bangham, a British biophysicist
- Edward Bangham, a British politician - refer List of MPs elected in the British general election, 1710

== Places ==
- Bangham, Tennessee, an unincorporated community in the United States
- Bangham, South Australia, a locality in South Australia
  - Bangham Conservation Park, a protected area in South Australia
  - Bangham Railway Station, a former railway station located in Bangham, South Australia

== Other ==
- Bangham Whistle - a type of Steam whistle also known as a Helmholtz whistle.
