= Geegeela Conservation Park =

Protected area in South Australia

- IUCN category III (natural monument or feature)
- Location within South Australia
- Location: South Australia
- Nearest city: Frances
- Coordinates: 36°38′01″S 140°51′12″E
- Area: 8.58 km^{2} (3.31 sq mi)
- Established: 21 July 2005
- Visitors: ‘few visitors’ (in 2005)
- Governing body: Department for Environment and Water
- Website: Official website

Geegeela Conservation Park is a protected area in the Australian state of South Australia located in the state's south-east in the gazetted locality of Bangham about 277 kilometres (172 mi) north-west of the state capital of Adelaide and about 12 kilometres (7.5 mi) north-west of the town centre in Frances.

The conservation park occupies land in sections 22 and 25 of the cadastral unit of the Hundred of Geegeela which is located to the west of the Bordertown-Frances Road. The land was purchased with assistance of the Australian Government's Natural Heritage Trust and was proclaimed on 21 July 2005 as a conservation park under the National Parks and Wildlife Act 1972. The name which was approved by the Surveyor General of South Australia in 2003 is derived from both the Hundred of Geegeela and “Geegeela Old Station” which is the name of the original homestead. As of 2018, it covered an area of 8.58 square kilometres (3.31 sq mi).

Land occupied by the conservation park was previously used both for agricultural and conservation purposes. During the 1960, an area of about 200 hectares (490 acres) in the conservation park's south-western corner was cleared and established as a pasture of native grasses which was grazed "for a number of years". About 1970, cultivation of an area of about 70 hectares (170 acres) was attempted "reputedly with limited success". Agricultural activity ceased with the cleared land being allowed to regenerate. The land subsequently acquired status in 1986 as a “private Heritage Agreement area” under then Native Vegetation Management Act 1985. In the early 1990s, the land changed ownership with the incoming owners deciding to retain it as a "private conservation area". A parcel of land consisting of land now in the conservation park and some land to the immediate west was proclaimed as a “sanctuary” under the National Parks and Wildlife Act 1972 on 20 August 1992, thereby renewing a status that existed briefly during the early 1970s.

In 2005, vegetation within the conservation park was observed as consisting principally of desert banksia heath, blue gum/pink gum open woodlands, and open woodlands and wetlands of brown stringybark with ‘’small patches of woodland dominated by’’ rough-barked manna gum, river red gum and buloke.

In 2005, fauna observed within the conservation park was reported as including five mammal species and 90 native avifauna species all with "state conservation significance". One species, the south-eastern red-tailed black cockatoo, is also listed under the Environment Protection and Biodiversity Conservation Act 1999 as a nationally endangered species.

In 2005, the level of visitation was described as follows - "few visitors come to the park at present." At the time, no facilities had been provided for visitors.

The conservation park is classified as an IUCN Category III protected area.

== See also ==
- Protected areas of South Australia
