= Wolseley Common Conservation Park =

Protected area in South Australia

- IUCN category III (natural monument or feature)
- Location within South Australia
- Location: South Australia
- Nearest city: Wolseley
- Coordinates: 36°22′05″S 140°54′02″E
- Area: 24 ha (59 acres)
- Established: 29 November 2001
- Visitors: “receives few visitors” (in 2006)
- Governing body: Department for Environment and Water

Wolseley Common Conservation Park is a protected area located in the Australian state of South Australia in the locality of Wolseley about 260 kilometres (160 mi) south-east of the state capital of Adelaide, about 13 kilometres (8.1 mi) south-east of the town of Bordertown and immediately adjoining the south-west side of the town of Wolseley.

The conservation park consists of the following crown land in the cadastral unit of the Hundred of Tatiara which previously was the “former parklands and closed road reserves on the western and southern sides” of the town of Wolseley - Allotment 100 of DP 53044, Allotment 1 of DP 55986, Allotments 50, 51 and 52 of DP 28840, Pieces 20 and 21 of FP 218022, and Section 1013. It is divided into two parts by the alignment of West Terrace and its continuation as Teatrick Road to the south-west.

It came into existence on 29 November 2001 by proclamation under the National Parks and Wildlife Act 1972 to protect both “the nationally threatened Buloke Woodland” which is “one of the last remaining in South Australia” and the “plant and fauna species of conservation significance” located within its boundaries. As of 2016, it covered an area of 24 hectares (59 acres).

The land within the conservation park was part of the parklands around the town of Wolseley (then known as Tatiara) proclaimed on 8 May 1884. The parklands had a history of being used for “depasturing animals, firewood gathering and rubbish dumping”. During World War 2, part of the land in the western parkland was cleared to create a “sports oval” with a cycling and running track on its perimeter. By the 1960s, the land now under protection “was reported to have been reduced to bare ground with only a few scattered Buloke trees…” However, the decline of Wolseley as a railway town reduced the above-mentioned impacts on the land with the subsequent regeneration of the native vegetation.

In 2006, the conservation park was described as follows:

1. It has an “intact remnant of Buloke (Allocasuarina luehmannii) Low Woodland” with an understorey which “retains a high diversity of native grasses, sedges and herbaceous species” and was considered to be “the best example of a remaining pure Buloke Low Woodland ecosystem on gilgai soil in South Australia”.
2. It had “at least 68 native plant species” of which eleven species were listed as threatened under the National Parks and Wildlife Act 1972.
3. It had “at least 30 bird species” including the following seven species having “a conservation rating within the South East region” - yellow thornbill (Acanthiza nana modesta), white-winged chough (Corcorax melanorhamphos whitaea), red-capped robin (Petroica goodenovii), collared sparrowhawk (Accipiter cirrhocephalus), sulphur-crested cockatoo (Cacatua galerita) and long-billed corella (Cacatua tenuirostris).
4. It had six reptile species including the olive snake-lizard (Delma inornata) which is listed as rare in South Australia.
5. The only native mammal recorded to date is the fat-tailed dunnart (Sminthopsis crassicaudata).

As of 2006, visitation was limited to "casual" use by low residents.

The conservation park is classified as an IUCN Category III protected area.

== See also ==
- Protected areas of South Australia
