= The Border Chronicle =

Weekly newspaper in Bordertown, South Australia

- Type: Weekly newspaper
- Owner: Australian Community Media
- Founded: June 1908
- Language: English
- City: Bordertown, South Australia
- Website: borderchronicle.com.au

The Border Chronicle is a weekly newspaper published in Bordertown, South Australia from June 1908 to the present day. Its head office is in Smith Street, Naracoorte.

== History ==
The paper's founder was Leslie Duncan. The first issue of The Border Chronicle (subtitled: "The only newspaper printed in the huge Tatiara District") was Saturday 13 June 1908. It described itself as "A Journal devoted to the News of the district. the various markets, and condensed reports of State, Inter-State and World's News". It was published in broadsheet style, in a press at the rear of Bordertown's first institute building on Woolshed Street.

Donald Campbell became the sole proprietor in 1931. In 1939, the paper moved to 74 DeCourcey Street in Bordertown, and in 1950 it was bought by Roy Poulton and Ross Warne. The business continued as Neil Poulton took over, with the Poulton family involved in running the business for nearly 80 years.

Alongside many other rural publications in Australia, the newspaper was a member of Fairfax Media Limited (after being purchased in 2010). The newspaper's first building, at DeCourcey Street, was auctioned in November 2017, after Fairfax scaled back newspaper operations and closed the Chronicle's commercial printing business and office.

The former office was used as a rental for a year. In August 2018, a fire broke out at the former office. After further investigation, cannabis and other drug paraphernalia were found at the site. It is unknown if anyone was caught or charged.

It was later sold to Rural Press, previously owned by Fairfax Media, and then transitioned to an Australian media company trading as Australian Community Media. In 2023, the Border Chronicle along with other ACM newspapers were purchased by Star News Group and operate under SA Today Pty Ltd.

In October 2025, the former, burnt office had been sold for $35,000 (AUD).

== Distribution ==
The Border Chronicle is published every Wednesday, and serves the Tatiara District, which includes major towns such as Bordertown, Keith, Mundulla, Padthaway, and Wolseley. Its circulation also includes Tintinara, Coonalpyn and across the state border to Kaniva in Victoria. It has an estimated weekly readership of 5,300. Like other SA Today publications, the newspaper is also available online.

== Digitisation ==
The National Library of Australia has digitised photographic copies of early issues of The Border Chronicle from Vol 1, No.1 of 13 June 1908 to Vol. 43 No. 2,184 of 21 December 1950, which may be accessed via Trove.
