= Members of the South Australian Legislative Council, 1938–1941 =

This is a list of members of the South Australian Legislative Council from 1938 to 1941.

Name	District	Party	Term expiry	Time in office
Joseph Anderson	Central No. 1	Independent	1944	1931–1944
Alec Bagot ^{[1]}	Southern	Independent	1941	1938–1941
James Beerworth ^{[2]}	Northern	Labor	1941	1939–1947
Percy Blesing	Northern	LCL	1941	1924–1949
Ernest William Castine	Midland	LCL	1941	1933–1947
Frank Condon	Central No. 1	Labor	1944	1928–1961
John Cowan	Southern	LCL	1944	1910–1944
Collier Cudmore	Central No. 2	LCL	1941	1933–1959
Walter Gordon Duncan	Midland	LCL	1944	1918–1962
Sir David Gordon	Midland	LCL	1944	1913–1944
Frank Halleday	Southern	Independent	1944	1938–1943
Walter Hannaford	Midland	LCL	1941	1912–1941
Hartley Gladstone Hawkins ^{[2]}	Northern	LCL	1941	1933–1939
Sir Edward Holden	Central No. 2	LCL	1944	1935–1947
Hermann Homburg	Central No. 2	LCL	1941	1933–1941
Thomas McCallum ^{[1]}	Southern	LCL	1941	1920–1938
Lyell McEwin	Northern	LCL	1944	1934–1975
Oscar Oates	Central No. 1	Labor	1941	1933–1951
Sir George Ritchie	Northern	LCL	1944	1924–1944
Sir James Wallace Sandford	Central No. 2	LCL	1944	1938–1956
Stanley Whitford	Central No. 1	Independent	1941	1929–1941
Harry Dove Young	Southern	LCL	1941	1927–1941

^{1} LCL MLC Thomas McCallum died on 20 April 1938. Independent candidate Alec Bagot won the resulting by-election on 18 June.
^{2} LCL MLC Hartley Gladstone Hawkins died on 9 July 1939. Labor candidate James Beerworth won the resulting by-election on 2 September.
