= Custon, South Australia =

Custon South Australia
- Coordinates: 36.43753974°S 140.92105556°E
- Population: 20 (2016 census)
- Established: 8 December 1881 (town); 16 March 2000 (locality)
- Abolished: 1 July 1993 (town)
- Postcode(s): 5270
- Time zone: ACST (UTC+9:30)
  - Summer (DST): ACST (UTC+10:30)
- Location: 267 km (166 mi) south-east of Adelaide; 19 km (12 mi) south of Bordertown
- LGA(s): Tatiara District Council
- Region: Limestone Coast
- County: Buckingham
- State electorate(s): MacKillop
- Federal division(s): Barker
Mean max temp	Mean min temp	Annual rainfall
21.5 °C; 71 °F	8.6 °C; 47 °F	453.8 mm 17.9 in
Localities around Custon:
Wolseley	Wolseley	Serviceton
Pooginagoric	Custon	Serviceton
Bangham	Bangham	Serviceton
- Footnotes: Coordinates; Locations; Climatic data Adjoining Localities

Custon is a locality in the Australian state of South Australia located in the state's south-east within the Limestone Coast region about 267 kilometres (166 miles) south east of the state capital of Adelaide, about 19.5 kilometres (12.1 miles) south-east of the municipal seat of Bordertown and adjoining the border with the State of Victoria.

Custon began as a government town which was surveyed in September 1881 and was proclaimed on 8 December 1881. It was named after the Reverend Percy Cust who married Lucy Caroline Jervois, the second daughter of William Jervois, the then Governor of South Australia. In 1961, a portion of the government town was ceased and was subsequently declared as ceasing to exist in 1993. In 2000, boundaries were declared for the locality which includes the extent of the ceased government town and which was given the “long established name.”

The Mount Gambier railway line which closed on 12 April 1995 passes through the locality from north to south with the former railway station with the name of Custon being located to the immediate south in the locality of Wolseley.

The majority land use within the locality is primary production. The locality includes land proclaimed for conservation purposes as the Custon Conservation Park.

The 2016 Australian census which was conducted in August 2016 reports that Custon had a population of 20 people.

Custon is located within the federal division of Barker, the state electoral district of MacKillop and the local government area of the Tatiara District Council.
