= Frances, South Australia =

Frances South Australia
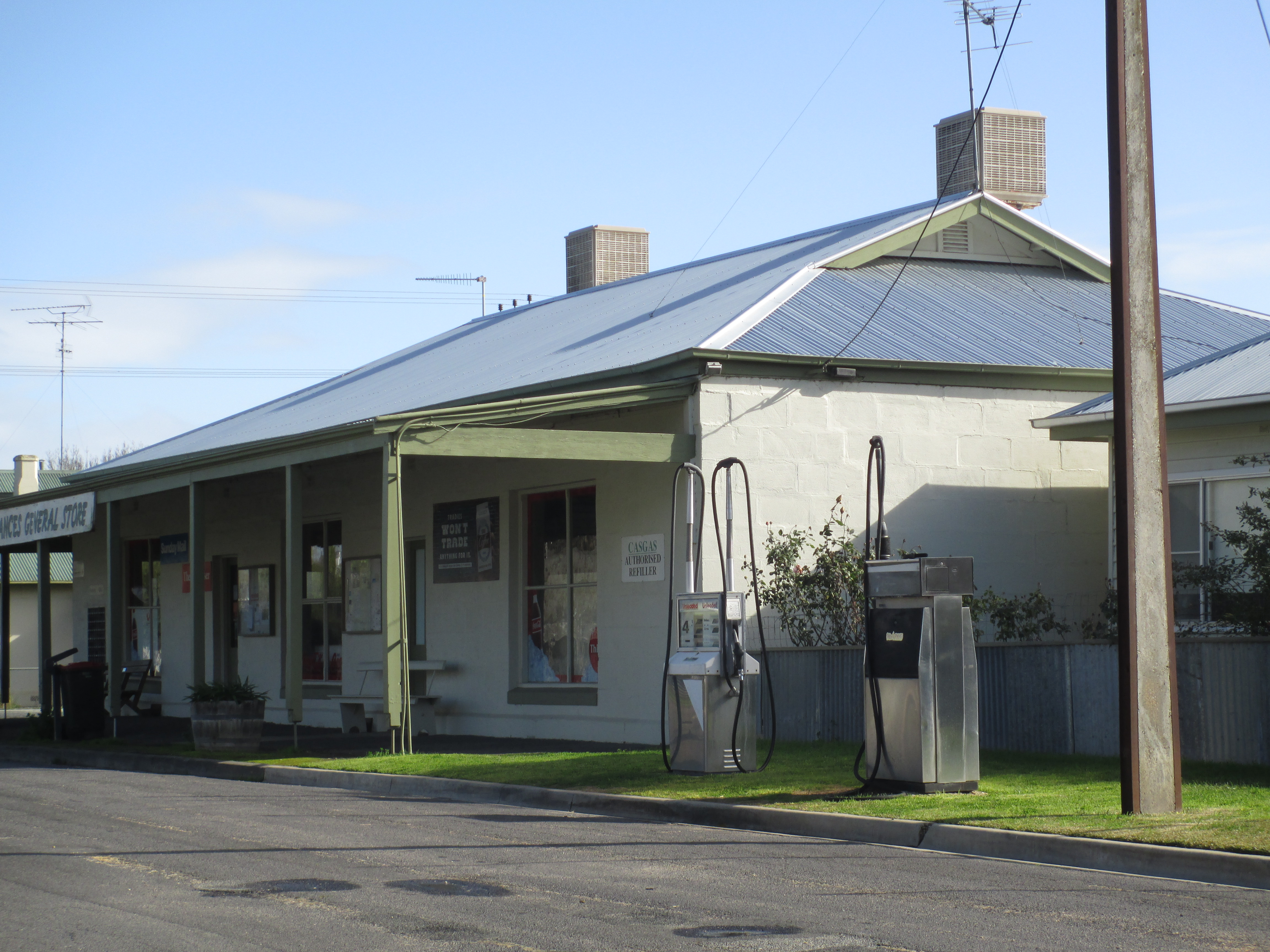
- Frances General Store, 2016

- Coordinates: 36°42′47″S 140°57′18″E
- Population: 92 (SAL 2021)
- Established: 1871 (town); 12 April 2001 (locality)
- Postcode(s): 5262
- Time zone: ACST (UTC+9:30)
  - Summer (DST): ACST (UTC+10:30)
- Location: 291 km (181 mi) SE of Adelaide; 32 km (20 mi) NE of Naracoorte
- LGA(s): Naracoorte Lucindale Council
- Region: Limestone Coast
- County: MacDonnell
- State electorate(s): MacKillop
- Federal division(s): Barker
Localities around Frances:
Western Flat	Bangham	Neuarpurr
The Gap	Frances	Neuarpurr
The Gap	Binnum	Neuarpurr
- Footnotes: Locations; Adjoining localities

Frances is a town in the Australian state of South Australia located about 291 kilometres (181 mi) south-east of the state capital, Adelaide and about 40 kilometres (25 mi) north-east of the municipal seat of Naracoorte in the state's Limestone Coast region and adjoining the border with the State of Victoria.

Frances began as a government town first surveyed in July 1871 and then resurveyed in January. Its name is reported as being derived from the name of the wife of "Mr Henry Jones of Binnum Station." Boundaries of the locality were created in April 2001.

For much of its history, Frances was a railway town on the Mount Gambier railway line, which runs from Wolseley in the north to Mount Gambier in the south. A State Road, Frances Road, runs from Bordertown through Frances to Hynam. Despite the closure of the railway on 12 April 1995, Frances continues to be a receiving point for grain, with several silos. It set a record for the most grain received at Frances in the season on 10 January 2017, by which time it had received over 43,000 tonnes (42,000 long tons; 47,000 short tons). It also set a new record for the most grain received in a single day at the site.

Every February from 2000 to 2019, Frances hosted the Frances Folk Gathering, a weekend-long folk music festival, with the whole town given over to music and visitors.

Frances is located within the federal division of Barker, the state electoral district of MacKillop and the local government area of the Naracoorte Lucindale Council.
