= Western Flat, South Australia =

Western Flat South Australia
- Coordinates: 36°31′17″S 140°44′46″E
- Population: 121 (2016 census)
- Established: 16 March 2000
- Postcode(s): 5268
- Time zone: ACST (UTC+9:30)
  - Summer (DST): ACST (UTC+10:30)
- Location: 264 km (164 mi) SE of Adelaide; 22 km (14 mi) S of Bordertown
- LGA(s): Tatiara District Council
- Region: Limestone Coast
- County: MacDonnell
- State electorate(s): MacKillop
- Federal division(s): Barker
Mean max temp	Mean min temp	Annual rainfall
21.5 °C; 71 °F	8.6 °C; 47 °F	453.8 mm 17.9 in
Suburbs around Western Flat:
Mundulla West	Mundulla West; Mundulla; Bordertown South; Pooginagoric	Pooginagoric
Mundulla West; Padthaway	Western Flat	Pooginagoric; Bangham
Padthaway	The Gap	Frances
- Footnotes: Locations; Adjoining localities

Western Flat is a locality in the Australian state of South Australia located in the state's south-east within the Limestone Coast region about 264 kilometres (164 mi) south east of the state capital of Adelaide and about 22 kilometres (14 mi) south of the municipal seat of Bordertown.

Boundaries for the locality were created on 16 March 2000 for the “long established name.” Its name is ultimately derived from the ‘Western Flat Run’ pastoral lease which was established in 1868 by T. Brown.

The land use in the locality is ‘primary production’.

The 2016 Australian census which was conducted in August 2016 reports that Western Flat had a population of 121 people.

Western Flat is located within the federal division of Barker, the state electoral district of MacKillop and the local government area of the Tatiara District Council.
