= James Beerworth =

Australian politician

James Michael Beerworth (22 April 1884 – 11 March 1959) was a South Australian Labor Party politician.

== History ==
Beerworth was the third son of William Carl Beerworth (ca.1848 – 10 May 1913) and his wife Mary Beerworth, née McInerney (20 October 1844 – 15 July 1921), later of Kooringa. They had a farm some 20 miles (32 km) north of Carrieton, in the Hundred of Boolcunda.

Beerworth joined the South Australian Police force in 1911, serving until 1925, when bought the Pastoral Hotel in Port Augusta in 1925.

He was elected unopposed to the Corporate Town of Port Augusta West council in 1926 for the Ebenezer ward, and continued on that council, serving as mayor from 1928 to 1930. It was amalgamated into the Corporate Town of Port Augusta in 1932, and Beerworth was elected the first mayor of the enlarged Port Augusta municipality, retaining that position until 1935, when he was succeeded by Lindsay Riches. Beerworth stood unsuccessfully as an Australian Labor Party candidate for a Northern district seat on the South Australian Legislative Council in 1930, then in 1933 was elected to the seat of Newcastle in the House of Assembly. At the following election, in 1938, he and Charles Leonard Davis were Labor candidates for the Northern district seat on the Legislative Council, but were beaten by Liberal and Country League (LCL) candidates Lyell McEwin and George Ritchie. Another seat in the same district became vacant when H. G. Hawkins died in 1939, and Beerworth won the resulting by-election. He held the seat until 1947, when he stood for re-election but was defeated.

Longtime residents of Port Augusta, the Beerworths left for Adelaide in 1950.

== Family ==
James' brother, Fred Beerworth, was a federal Senator for South Australia from 1946 to 1951.

Beerworth married Jean Murphy, of 'The Pines,' Bendleby on 11 August 1915. Their only daughter Moryah married Jack Curtis Fullerton of Port Augusta sometime around 1940.

Civic offices
Preceded by L. M. Sanderson	Mayor of Port Augusta West; 1927–1930	Succeeded by T. C. Chinnery
Preceded by K. H. Hunter	Mayor of Port Augusta; 1932–1936	Succeeded by Lindsay Riches
South Australian House of Assembly
Preceded by Thomas Butterfield; William Harvey	Member for Newcastle; 1933–1938; Served alongside: Lindsay Riches	Succeeded by George Jenkins (as single-member seat)
South Australian Legislative Council
Preceded by Hartley Gladstone Hawkins	Member for Northern District; 1939–1947	Succeeded by William Walsh Robinson
