= Patrick Boyce Coglin =

Australian politician and businessman

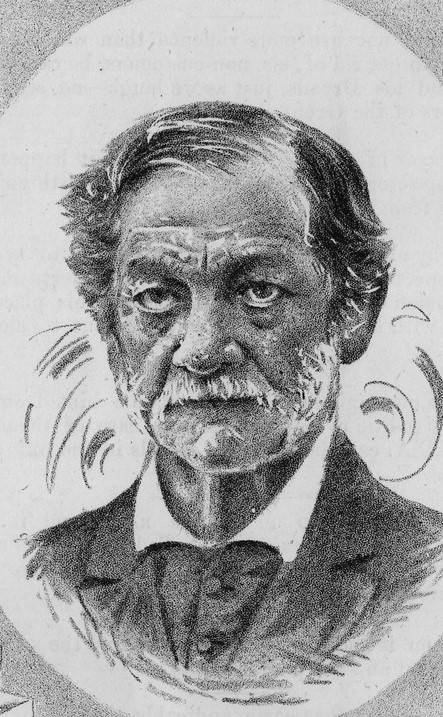

Member of the South Australian House of Assembly for Port Adelaide
- In office 1860–1864

Member of the South Australian House of Assembly for Light
- In office 1865–1868

Member of the South Australian House of Assembly for West Adelaide
- In office 1871–1874

Member of the South Australian House of Assembly for Flinders
- In office 1875–1881, 1883–1884

Member of the South Australian House of Assembly for Newcastle
- In office 1884–1887

Personal details
- Born: 15 January 1815 Ballynote, Ireland
- Died: 22 July 1892 (aged 77)

Patrick Boyce Coglin (15 January 1815 – 22 July 1892) was a businessman and politician in the early days of South Australia.

Coglin was born at Ballynote, in County Sligo in Ireland. His uncle, Dr. Boyce, of Tullamore, county Roscommon, was a noted horse breeder. In 1831 he, his parents, brothers and sisters sailed for Tasmania in the Lindsay, captain Fenton, arriving in Hobart on 24 June. After completing his education in Hobart he was articled to Mr. Biggins, a prominent architect and builder. In 1836 or 1837 he left the Lady Liverpool for South Australia, where he married Mrs. Frances Gerrard, the mother of William Gerrard of Yolo Station at Rapid Bay. Shortly after his arrival he purchased from Charles Beaumont Howard, the Colonial Chaplain, land in Hindley Street and opened a timber-yard, which developed into a flourishing business, bringing in Tasmanian timber, and when the Burra mines were opened up he purchased the site upon which the Napoleon and Royal Exchange Hotels later stood, to cope with the expanded business. He built the first Napoleon Hotel, and was its landlord for many years. He purchased more land about the corner of Waymouth and King William Streets, which he later sold at a great profit. He invested in pastoral properties, in which he was equally successful.

About 1877 he purchased a section of land adjoining Brompton and laid it out as a township, giving it the name of Brompton Park, where resided until his death. Coglin Street is a major thoroughfare in this area.

== Politics ==
In 1860 Coglin was elected to the South Australian House of Assembly for the district of Port Adelaide. This Parliament lasted from 1860 to 1862, and in 1863 he was returned for the same constituency, for which he sat until 1864. At the general election of 1865 he was elected for the district of Light, which he represented until 1868, when the fourth Parliament was dissolved. He remained out of the House for three years, but in 1871 he was elected for West Adelaide. Three years later he again retired from politics, reappearing in 1875 as member for Flinders, holding his seat for seven years, being re-elected in 1875 and 1878. In 1881 and 1882 he was once more out of the House, but was returned in 1883 and he sat until 1884. At the general election of that year he was returned with Thomas Burgoyne for the newly constituted district of Newcastle, but since 1887, when he had to give place to the Hon. T. Playford, who had been beaten at East Torrens, he did not occupy a seat in the House. At the general election of 1890 he stood for West Adelaide, but was defeated, and was also unsuccessful at the South Australian Legislative Council elections in 1891. At one time he took considerable interest in municipal matters and was elected mayor of Hindmarsh in December, 1888, remaining in office for one year.

Dubbed "Polysyllabic Coglin" for his love and frequent use of long and obscure words, his "absolute fearlessness in denouncing friend and foe alike", his wit and good humour, hard work and dedication endeared him to his constituents. Unostentatiously benevolent, he was held in high regard by Catholic and Protestant alike

== Other interests ==
He took a keen interest in thoroughbred racing, and it was owing to his exertions that the original grandstand was erected on the Old Adelaide Racecourse, and a lease of the course was obtained from the City Corporation. For some years he had a large stud at Smithfield, which was broken up a few years before his death, the horses being disposed of in Melbourne in 1884.

He was for many years a prominent Freemason, but in 1892 renounced all such associations in order to comply with what were then requirements of the Roman Catholic Church, into which he had been baptised and confirmed.

He died after several months of ill health and was buried with his mother, who was interred in 1877 in the family vault in the Catholic section of the West Terrace Cemetery. His wife died on 17 October 1883, at the age of 76, and was interred in an elaborate mausoleum in the West Terrace Cemetery. They had no surviving children.
