= Bordertown South, South Australia =

Bordertown South South Australia
- Coordinates: 36°26′08″S 140°44′12″E
- Population: 44 (2016 census)
- Established: 16 March 2000
- Postcode(s): 5268
- Time zone: ACST (UTC+9:30)
  - Summer (DST): ACST (UTC+10:30)
- Location: 255 km (158 mi) E of Adelaide; 14 km (9 mi) N of Bordertown
- LGA(s): Tatiara District Council
- Region: Limestone Coast
- County: Buckingham; MacDonnell
- State electorate(s): MacKillop
- Federal division(s): Barker
Mean max temp	Mean min temp	Annual rainfall
21.5 °C; 71 °F	8.6 °C; 47 °F	453.8 mm 17.9 in
Suburbs around Bordertown South:
Mundulla	Bordertown	Bordertown
Mundulla	Bordertown South	Pooginagoric
Western Flat	Western Flat	Western Flat
- Footnotes: Locations; Adjoining localities

Bordertown South is a locality in the Australian state of South Australia located in the state's south-east within the Limestone Coast region about 255 kilometres (158 mi) east of the state capital of Adelaide and about 14 kilometres (8.7 mi) south of the municipal seat of Bordertown.

Boundaries for the locality were created on 16 March 2000 for the “local name.”

Land use within Bordertown South is “primary production”.

The 2016 Australian census which was conducted in August 2016 reports that Bordertown South had 44 people living within its boundaries.

Bordertown South is located within the federal division of Barker, the state electoral district of MacKillop and the local government area of the Tatiara District Council.
