= Clayton Farm Heritage Museum =

Coordinates: 36.3316°S 140.7587°E

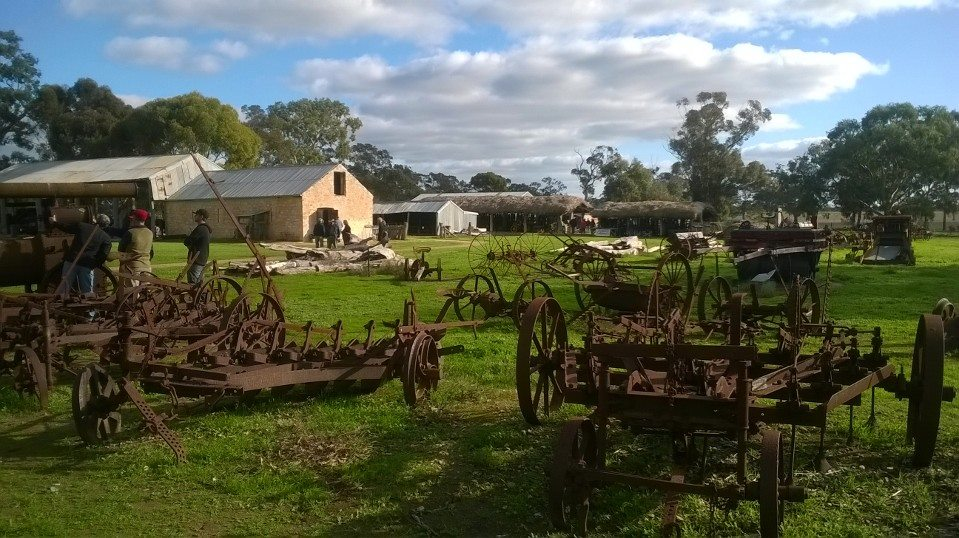
- A view of old farming equipment at Clayton Farm Heritage Museum.

- Location within South Australia
- Established: 1885
- Location: Bordertown, South Australia
- Type: Farm museum

An old wagon situated at the museum.

Clayton Farm Heritage Museum is the former home of the Wiese family located off Naracoorte Road on the outskirts of Bordertown, South Australia. It consists of a group of historical thatched buildings and sheds, including the largest thatched structure in the Southern Hemisphere. The historic farm homestead dates back to 1885 with a woolshed dating back to 1901. Volunteers have spent over 20 years restoring the homestead, stocking it with a substantial collection of restored historical farm machinery and stationary engines.

The Wiese family occupied Clayton Farm until 1981, when Jeff Wiese reached an agreement with the Bordertown and District Agricultural Museum to lease an area of 3.48 hectares of land containing an outstanding collection of historic buildings. In February 2004, a fire swept through the museum and destroyed several sheds and some machinery. It was feared the museum would be closed but rebuilding has begun.

The farm was listed on the South Australian Heritage Register on 20 November 1986.
