= Corporate Town of Port Augusta West =

- Local government area
- Coordinates: 32°29′03″S 137°45′30″E
- Country: Australia
- State: South Australia
- Established: 1887
- Abolished: 1932

Area
  - Total: 8.5 km^{2} (3.3 sq mi)

Population
  - Total: 384 (1921)
  - Density: 45.2/km^{2} (117.0/sq mi)

The Corporate Town of Port Augusta West was a local government area in South Australia centred on the suburb of Port Augusta West. It was gazetted on 6 October 1887. They met in council chambers in Loudon Road, which ceased to be used by its successor council upon its amalgamation, but remained in use by the community until their demolition in the 1940s, at which time the building was described as "definitely unsafe". It was not uncommon for positions to be elected unopposed or without any nominations at all; in the election of November 1903, no one nominated for either mayor or councillor.

In 1923, the council controlled an area of 2,100 acres (8.5 km^{2}), with a capital value of £59,710. It had a population of 384 at the 1921 census, residing in 90 dwellings. On 28 April 1932, along with the Corporate Town of Davenport and part of the District Council of Woolundunga, it merged into the existing Corporate Town of Port Augusta, predecessor of the current City of Port Augusta. Its second-last mayor, James Beerworth, would go on to serve as the first mayor of the amalgamated council, and subsequently serve in both houses of the Parliament of South Australia.

== Mayors ==
- Norman Alexander Richardson (1896–1898)
- John Harris (1898)
- H. M. Sparkman (1898–1900)
- Edward Geering (1900–1903)
- Alexander Bothwell (1904)
- Edward Bowden Francis (1912)
- Michael John Cleary (1920–1921)
- Lyal Vance Herbert Dighton (1921)
- Thomas Charles Chinnery (1921–1924)
- Lindsay Mallett Sanderson (1924–1927)
- James Beerworth (1927–1930)
- Thomas Charles Chinnery (1930–1932)

== See also ==
- Local Government Areas (Re-arrangement) Acts 1929 and 1931
