= Bangham Conservation Park =

Protected area in South Australia

- IUCN category III (natural monument or feature)
- Location within South Australia
- Location: South Australia
- Nearest city: Naracoorte
- Coordinates: 36°36′11″S 140°55′51″E
- Area: 8.69 km^{2} (3.36 sq mi)
- Established: 22 November 1973
- Visitors: 'low level' (in 1992)
- Governing body: Department for Environment and Water

Bangham Conservation Park is a protected area in the Australian state of South Australia located in the state's Limestone Coast in the gazetted locality of Bangham about 45 kilometres (28 mi) north-east of the town centre in Naracoorte.

In the mid-1930s Professor Cleland called on the South Australian government to declare the Bangham forest a nature reserve, as an example of fast-disappearing southern Murray woodland, and home of South Australia's last indigenous koalas.

The conservation park occupies land in section 4 and Allotment 1 of Deposited Plan 78796 in the cadastral unit of the Hundred of Geegeela which is bounded by the Bordertown-Frances Road on its western side, a road on its southern side and the Bordertown – Naracoorte railway line on its eastern side. As of 1992, access tracks had been constructed along the northern and eastern boundaries of section 4 while an easement for an electricity transmission line passed through the western side of the conservation park.

The land originally gained protected area status in 1973, when section 4 was gazetted as the Bangham Conservation Park. In 2010, additional land consisting of Allotment 1 of Deposited Plan 78796 was added to the north side of the conservation park.

The land was offered in 1971 to the government of South Australia for conservation purposes. At the time, it consisted of 6.76 square kilometres (2.61 sq mi) of "native scrub" and 1.25 square kilometres (0.48 sq mi) of "cleared land" with the majority of the latter occupying its south-east corner. A subsequent study revealed that the land was used by red-tailed black cockatoos which at the time had "limited distribution" in South Australia and which made the land "particularly suitable for conservation purposes".

In 1992, the conservation park was described as follows:

(It) is characterised by an undulating plain of Tertiary sand with local ferruginous cappings overlain by easterly trending dunes and sheets of aeolian sand. Occasional sinkholes and small depressions are caused by solution of the underlying limestone. Soils … are generally bleached, deep acid sands with a yellow-grey B horizon.

As of 1982, vegetation within the conservation park consisted of the following three major plant associations - an "open forest - woodland" of South Australian blue gum, river red gum in "areas subject to inundation" and an "open forest - low open forest" of brown stringybark.

As of 1992, visitation to the conservation park was described as "low level of mainly local use with occasional visits from further afield by field naturalists and bird observers" and that no facilities had been provided for visitors.

The conservation park is classified as an IUCN Category III protected area.

== See also ==
- Protected areas of South Australia
