= Corporate Town of Davenport =

- Local government area
- Coordinates: 32°29′48″S 137°46′09″E
- Country: Australia
- State: South Australia
- Established: 1887
- Abolished: 1932

Population
  - Total: 1,128 (1923)

The Corporate Town of Davenport was a local government area in South Australia that existed from 1887 to 1932 on land now located within the suburb of Port Augusta.

A proposal to create a new local government area consisting of suburbs "annexed to the existing Corporation of Port Augusta" was discussed by residents interested in "the subject of local self-government" as recently as February 1887. On 1 March 1887, a meeting at the Pastoral Hotel agreed boundaries for a new corporation to be called Davenport which was to consist of three wards named First, Second and Third and signed a petition arguing for the creation of the new corporation. The corporation was gazetted by the Government of South Australia on 25 August 1887.

It was separate from the adjacent District Council of Davenport, which was renamed Woolundunga in 1893 to avoid confusion between the two.

In 1923, it had a reported population of 1,128, residing in 239 dwellings, with the municipality having a capital value of £126,600. As recently as 1931, it operated from offices located in Stirling Road which is now located in the suburb of Port Augusta.

On 28 April 1932 it merged into the existing Corporate Town of Port Augusta, along with the Corporate Town of Port Augusta West and part of the District Council of Woolundunga.

== Mayors ==
- D. J. Brown (1887–1889)
- J. E. Leckey (1890–1892)
- D. J. Brown (1893–1895)
- T. Hunter (1895)
- J. N. Conway (1908)
- A. G. Pappin (1910)
- R. Mullen (1915)
- Nicholas Mulhall (1920–1921)
- Sidney James Rowland Bidgood (1921–1922)
- Emmanuel James Holder (1922–1923)
- Herbert Richard Holds (1923–1932)

== See also ==
- Local Government Areas (Re-arrangement) Acts 1929 and 1931
