= Andrew Kirkpatrick (politician) =

Australian politician

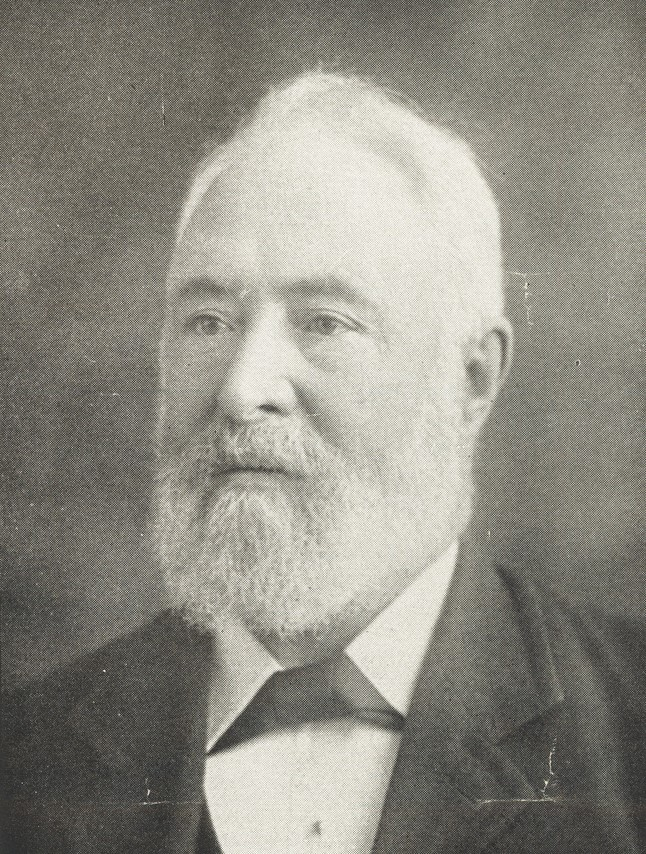

Leader of the Opposition in South Australia
- In office 1917 – 15 February 1918
- Preceded by: Crawford Vaughan
- Succeeded by: John Gunn

Leader of the South Australian Labor Party
- In office 6 March 1917 – 15 February 1918
- Preceded by: Crawford Vaughan
- Succeeded by: John Gunn

Personal details
- Born: 4 January 1848
- Died: 19 August 1928
- Party: Australian Labor Party (SA)

The Hon Andrew Alexander Kirkpatrick (4 January 1848 – 19 August 1928) was an Australian politician, representing the South Australian Branch of the Australian Labor Party. He was a member of the South Australian Legislative Council from 1891 to 1897 and 1900 to 1909, a member of the South Australian House of Assembly from 1915 to 1918, and again a member of the Legislative Council from 1918 to 1928. He was the state Agent General in London from 1909 to 1914. Kirkpatrick was state Labor leader from 1917 to 1918, when the party split nationally over Billy Hughes' stance on conscription.

== Early life ==
Kirkpatrick was born in 1848 and started working at the age of nine. He arrived in South Australia in 1860, went to night school, and apprenticed in the printing trade. He worked at The Advertiser and the Government Printing Office before founding his own printing firm. He served as the first president of the National Liberal Reform League in 1883, assisted in forming the United Trades and Labour Council of South Australia in 1884, and served on its parliamentary committee selecting candidates to support prior to the formation of the Labor Party.

== Parliament ==
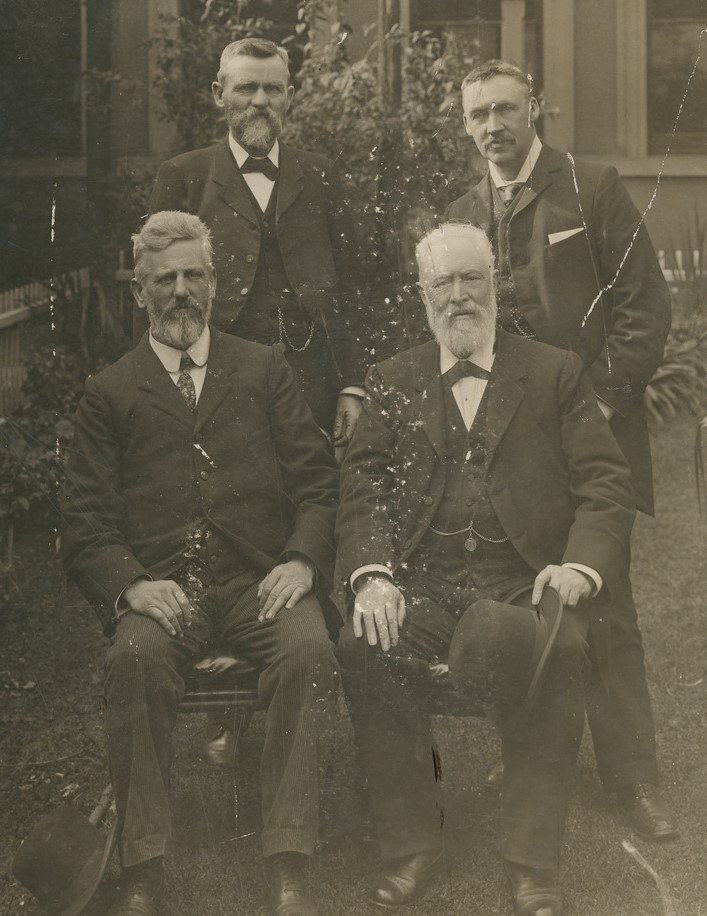
Price Ministry, c. 1905

In 1891, along with David Charleston and Robert Guthrie, he became one of the first Labor members of the Legislative Council, defeating Alexander Hay for his Southern District seat. He was defeated in 1897, but re-elected for the Central District in 1900. He served as Chief Secretary and Minister for Industry in the Price government from 1905 until 1909, when he was appointed the state's Agent-General in London. He was the first Agent General for South Australia to come from the Labor Party.

Kirkpatrick returned to South Australia in 1914, and was elected to the House of Assembly seat of Newcastle at the 1915 election. He was state leader of the Labor Party from 1917 to 1918 following the 1917 Labor split, and succeeded Crawford Vaughan as Leader of the Opposition when Vaughan's splinter National Party went into coalition with the conservative Liberal Union. While Kirkpatrick was the parliamentary leader, the United Labor Party became the Australian Labor Party (South Australian branch) on 14 September 1917. He returned to the Legislative Council at the 1918 state election representing Central District No. 1, and served as Minister for Mines, Minister for Marine, Minister for Immigration and Minister for Local Government in the Gunn and first Hill governments. He died in office in 1928 and was accorded a state funeral.

== Honours ==
Kirkpatrick is honoured on the Jubilee 150 Walkway as a printer and union leader.

Political offices
Preceded by Crawford Vaughan	Leader of the Opposition of South Australia; 1917 – 1918	Succeeded by John Gunn
South Australian House of Assembly
New district	Member for Newcastle; 1915 – 1918; Served alongside: Thomas Butterfield, Edward Twopeny	Succeeded by William Harvey
Party political offices
Preceded by Crawford Vaughan	Leader of the Australian Labor Party (South Australian Branch); 1917 – 1918	Succeeded by John Gunn
Diplomatic posts
Preceded by John Jenkins	Agent-General for South Australia; 1909–1914	Succeeded by Frederick William Young
