= Tatiara District Council =

Coordinates: 36°18′41″S 140°46′25″E

- Local government area
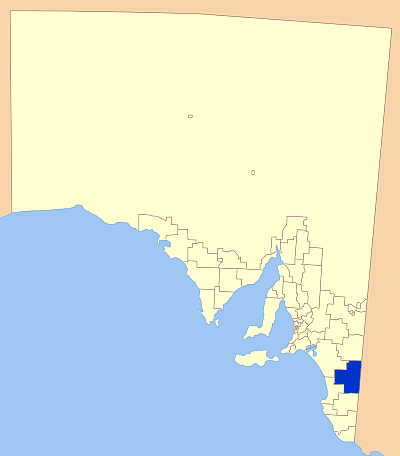
- Location of Tatiara District Council in blue

- Interactive map of Tatiara District Council
- Country: Australia
- State: South Australia
- Region: Limestone Coast
- Established: 29 June 1876
- Council seat: Bordertown

Government
  - Mayor: Liz Goossens
  - State electorate: MacKillop
  - Federal division: Barker

Area
  - Total: 6,476 km^{2} (2,500 sq mi)

Population
  - Total: 6,891 (LGA 2021)
  - Density: 1.06/km^{2} (2.7/sq mi)
- Website: Tatiara District Council
LGAs around Tatiara District Council
| The Coorong District Council | Southern Mallee District Council |
| | Tatiara District Council | West Wimmera (Vic) |
| Kingston District Council | Naracoorte Lucindale Council |

Tatiara District Council is a local government area located in south-eastern South Australia. The name Tatiara is said to mean "the good country", a phrase which dates back to the area's first inhabitants, the Bodaruwitj people. It is one of the largest local government areas in South Australia at 6,476 km^{2} (2,500 sq mi). The district's economy is based primarily on agriculture, with cereal crops such as wheat, barley and oats and with livestock such as sheep, cattle and pigs prominent.

== History ==
The Tatiara country was opened up by European settlers in the 1840s for grazing purposes, with the township of Bordertown established in 1852, slowly expanding as more graziers moved to the area.

After significant growth in the area, the District Council of Tatiara was formed in 1876 as constituting the whole of the Hundred of Tatiara.

In 1884, a neighbouring council was established, the District Council of Wirrega; however this was short-lived, and in 1888 it was amalgamated into the Tatiara District Council.

In the years following, a number of new towns including Keith and Padthaway were established, and grew to their current sizes.

== Geography ==
It includes the towns and localities of Bangham, Bordertown, Bordertown South, Brimbago, Buckingham, Cannawigara, Carew, Custon, Keith, Kongal, Laffer, Lowan Vale, Makin, McCallum, Mount Charles, Mundulla, Mundulla West, Shaugh, Swede Flat, Padthaway, Petherick, Pine Hill, Pooginagoric, Senior, Sherwood, Western Flat, Willalooka, Wirrega and Wolseley, and part of Ngarkat.

== Facilities ==
The district has most of the usual facilities including a range of facilities for tourists and travellers. Accommodation is available in the major towns in the form of hotels and caravan parks with a variety of shops such as supermarkets, bakeries and roadhouses for supplies.

The district possesses a range of sporting facilities including a golf course, basketball and tennis courts and a football and cricket oval, with clubs established for those sports. Health facilities include a hospital and dentist, with the area also having a primary and high school.

== Councillors ==
| Ward | Councillor | Notes |
|---|---|---|
| Mayor | Liz Goossens | |
| Elected Members | Linda Andersen | |
| Elected Members | Trevor Butler | |
| Elected Members | Miles Hannemann | |
| Elected Members | Deb Downing | |
| Elected Members | Richard Halliday | |
| Elected Members | Clarry Martin | |
| Elected Members | Cathy Langley | |
| Elected Members | Lynton Mackenzie | |
| Elected Members | Natalie Moore | |

== See also ==
- List of parks and gardens in rural South Australia
