= Electoral district of Newcastle (South Australia) =

Former state electoral district in South Australia

Coordinates: 32°06′57″S 138°22′28″E

Newcastle South Australia—House of Assembly
- State: South Australia
- Dates current: 1884–1902, 1915–1956
- Demographic: Rural

Newcastle was an electoral district of the House of Assembly in the Australian state of South Australia from 1884 to 1902 and again from 1915 to 1956.

The Newcastle electorate was based in the southern Flinders Ranges. In 1938, the polling places were Beltana, Blinman, Copley, Lynhurst Siding, Parachilna, Wooltana, Belton, Carrieton, Eurelia, Johnburgh, Yanyarrie, Cradock, Hawker, Hookina, Mernmerna, Warcowie, Farina, Marree, Oodnadatta, Bangor, Booleroo Centre, Melrose, Murray Town, Terka, Willowie, Wilmington, Black Rock, Morchard, Orroroo, Pekina, Walloway, Yatina, Boolcunda East, Bruce, Gordon, Hammond, Moockra, Wilson, Wyacca.

== Members ==
First incarnation (1884–1902)
Member	Party	Term	Member	Party	Term
Thomas Burgoyne		1884–1902	Patrick Coglin		1884–1887
Thomas Burgoyne		1884–1902	Thomas Playford		1887–1890
Thomas Burgoyne		1884–1902	Joseph Hancock		1890–1893
Thomas Burgoyne		1884–1902	Richard Foster		1893–1902

Second incarnation (1915–1938)
Member	Party	Term	Member	Party	Term
Andrew Kirkpatrick	Labor	1915–1918	Thomas Butterfield	Labor	1915–1917
Andrew Kirkpatrick	Labor	1915–1918	Edward Twopeny	Liberal Union	1917–1918
William Harvey	Labor	1918–1931	Thomas Butterfield	Labor	1918–1931
William Harvey	Parliamentary Labor	1931–1933	Thomas Butterfield	Parliamentary Labor	1931–1933
James Beerworth	Labor	1933–1938	Lindsay Riches	Labor	1933–1938

Single-member (1938–1956)
Member	Party	Term
George Jenkins	Liberal and Country	1938–1956
