= Bangham, South Australia =

Bangham South Australia
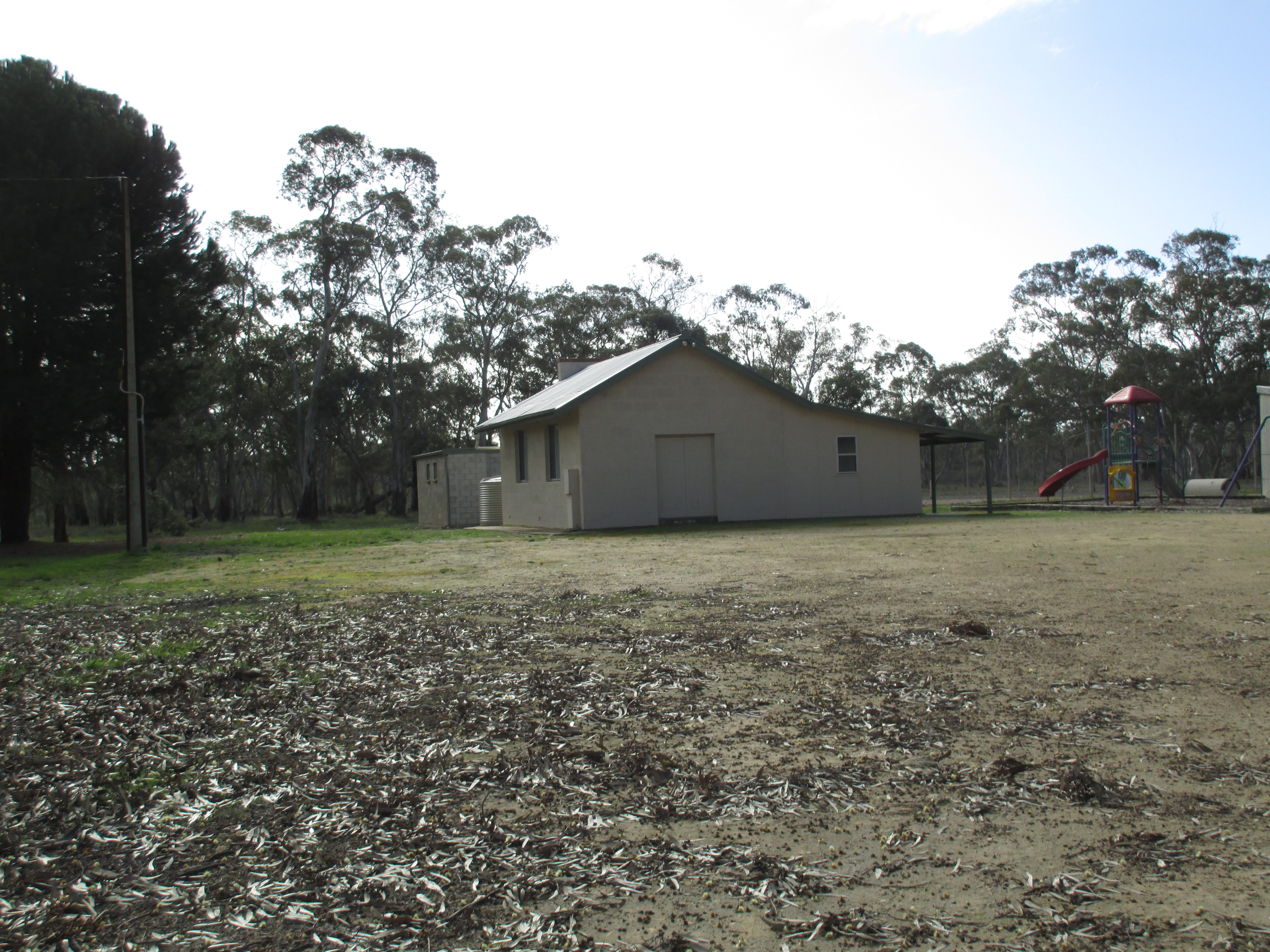
- Bangham hall is the size of a small house

- Coordinates: 36°33′51″S 140°56′13″E
- Population: 65 (2016 census)
- Established: 16 March 2000
- Postcode(s): 5268
- Elevation: 105 m (344 ft)
- Time zone: ACST (UTC+9:30)
  - Summer (DST): ACST (UTC+10:30)
- Location: 279 km (173 mi) south-east of Adelaide; 31.5 km (20 mi) south-east of Bordertown
- LGA(s): Tatiara District Council
- Region: Limestone Coast
- County: MacDonnell
- State electorate(s): MacKillop
- Federal division(s): Barker
Mean max temp	Mean min temp	Annual rainfall
21.5 °C; 71 °F	8.6 °C; 47 °F	453.8 mm 17.9 in
Localities around Bangham:
Western Flat	Pooginagoric; Custon	Serviceton
Western Flat	Bangham	Serviceton; Neuarpurr
The Gap	Frances	Neuarpurr
- Footnotes: Locations; Adjoining Localities

Bangham is a locality in the Australian state of South Australia located in the state's south-east within the Limestone Coast region about 279 kilometres (173 miles) south east of the state capital of Adelaide, about 31.5 kilometres (19.6 miles) south-east of the municipal seat of Bordertown and adjoining the border with the State of Victoria.

Boundaries were created in March 2000 for the “long established name” which is derived from existing geographical features such as the Bangham Railway Station. The name is ultimately derived from Edward Bangham who “held adjacent land under occupation licence in the 1840s.”

The Frances Road which is a road maintained by the Government of South Australia, passes through the locality from Bordertown in the north to Frances in the south. The Mount Gambier railway line which has been closed since 12 April 1995, passes from north to south through the locality on its east side. Infrastructure exists for two railway stations - one named Bangham in the locality’s centre and the other named Geegeela in the locality’s north.

The majority land use within the locality is primary production. Three areas of land have been proclaimed for conservation purposes as the Bangham Conservation Park, the Geegeela Conservation Park and the Pine Hill Soak Conservation Park.

The 2016 Australian census which was conducted in August 2016 reports that Bangham had a population of 65 people.

Bangham is located within the federal division of Barker, the state electoral district of MacKillop and the local government area of the Tatiara District Council.
