= Hartley Gladstone Hawkins =

Hartley Gladstone Hawkins (5 May 1877 – 9 July 1939) was a pastoralist and politician in South Australia.

== History ==
Hawkins was born at Warnertown, South Australia, the youngest son of William Clement Hawkins (c. 1844 – 7 June 1893) and his wife Miriam Jane Hawkins, née Tucker, of "Willow Lodge", Napperby. His father died when he was 16 years old, and he had to take much of the responsibility for running two farms totalling more than 1,700 acres (690 ha) in the Napperby region. He gained experience working in a Port Adelaide wool store, then a year with a livestock firm, and a year at an Adelaide hardware firm.

== Politics ==
Hawkins was involved in the early days of the Farmers' Union, as a shareholder and member of the Port Pirie and Warnertown committees. He was elected to the directorate of the Union in 1912, which he retained for 25 years, and became chairman in 1922, a position he held until his death. He travelled extensively, learning about dairying practices in New Zealand, marketing in England, farming in the United States and Canada and wheat marketing in the Baltic.

He was elected for the Liberal and Country League to the Legislative Council for the Northern district in 1933, and died shortly before the expiration of his term. The vacant seat was won by James Beerworth.

== Other interests ==
Hawkins was federal and state director of the Co-operative Insurance Co. of Aust., Ltd., and federal director of the Producers and Citizens Co-op. Assurance Co., Ltd. He was also on the directorate of the S.A. Co-op. Wheat Pools Ltd., Cresco Fertilizers Ltd. (S.A.) and the Renovial Rubber Co., Ltd.

He was a supporter of the Methodist Church, an ex officio member of the Methodist Conference and Methodist Church executive committee. He was on the Prince Alfred College committee, the Memorial Hospital committee, the Committee for Scriptural Instruction in State schools, the Wesley College Council, the board of the Epworth Book Depot, the superintendent of the Spicer Memorial Sunday school, and a member and trustee of the Australian Chapman-Alexander Bible Institute.

== Family ==
He married Bertha Elizabeth Sandow (10 February 1882 – 1962) of Trelawney, Mintaro on 3 August 1905; they had no children. He died at the Memorial Hospital after a long illness.
