= Mundulla =

- Town
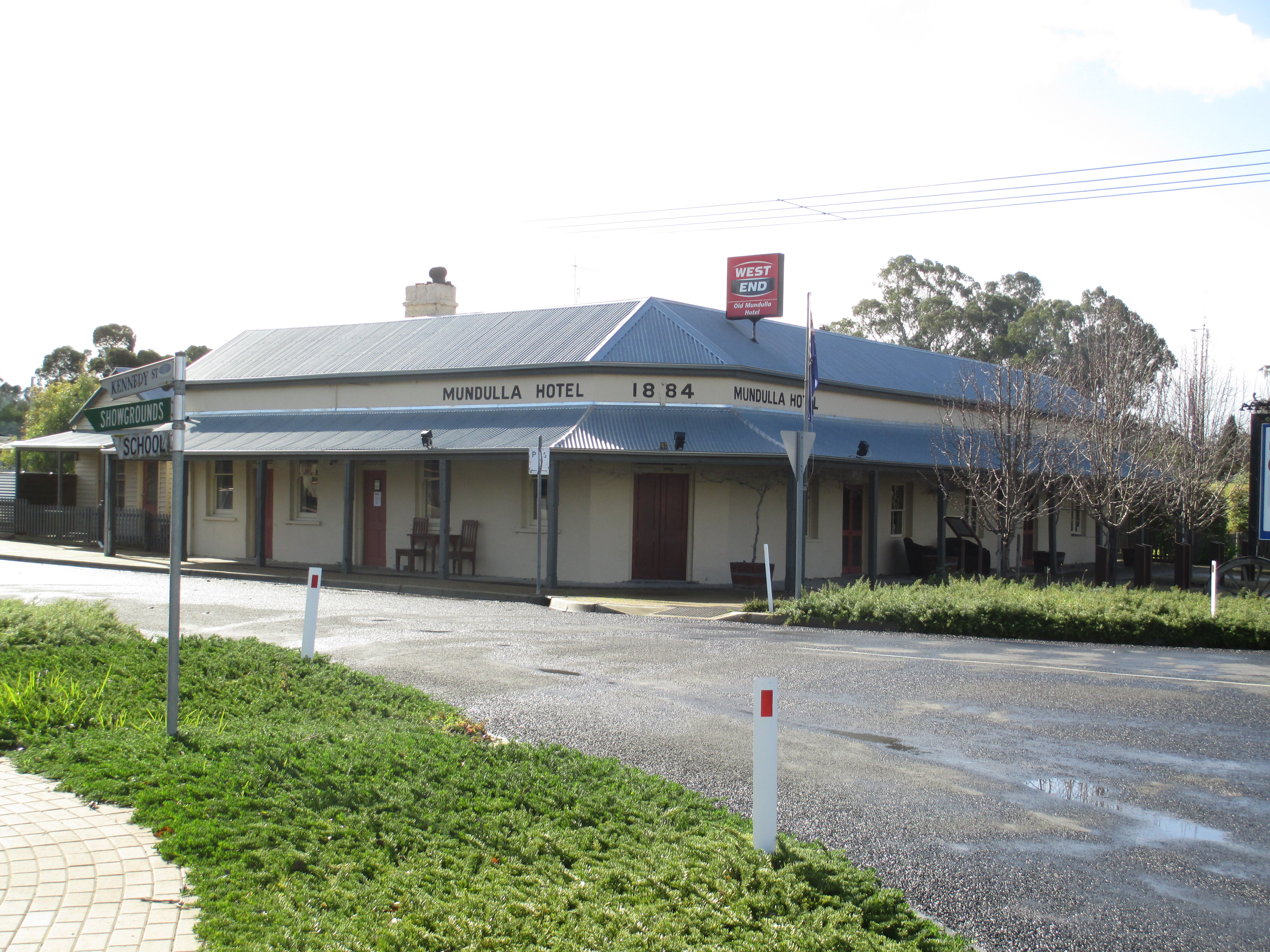
- Mundulla Hotel

- Coordinates: 36°21′42″S 140°41′29″E
- Country: Australia
- State: South Australia
- Region: Limestone Coast
- LGA: Tatiara District Council
- Location: 278 km (173 mi) SE of Adelaide; 10 km (6.2 mi) SW of Bordertown; 182 km (113 mi) N of Mount Gambier
- Established: 3 April 1873 (town); 16 March 2000 (locality)

Government
  - State electorate: MacKillop
  - Federal division: Barker

Population
  - Totals: 436 (state suburb) (2016 census); 315 (urban centre) (2016 census)
- Time zone: UTC+9:30 (ACST)
  - Summer (DST): UTC+10:30 (ACST)
- Postcode: 5270
- County: Buckingham
- Mean max temp: 21.5 °C (70.7 °F)
- Mean min temp: 8.6 °C (47.5 °F)
- Annual rainfall: 453.8 mm (17.87 in)
Localities around Mundulla
Cannawigara	Cannawigara	Bordertown
Buckingham; Mundulla West	Mundulla	Bordertown; Bordertown South
Western Flat	Western Flat	Western Flat

Mundulla is a town and a locality in south eastern South Australia. The town is located in the local government area of Tatiara District Council about 278 kilometres (173 mi) south east of the state capital of Adelaide.

The name of the town is derived from the Aboriginal word mantala meaning "place of thunder", referring to a rumbling sound made when trampling on the earth. The Council enquired about the spelling in 1965 and the Postmaster General proposed to change it to Mundalla in 1972, but this was not approved by the Geographical Names Board.

At the 2016 census, the locality had a population of 436 of which 314 lived in its town centre.

The Mundulla school opened in 1878. An Australian rules football club, Mundulla Football Club, compete in the Kowree Naracoorte Tatiara Football League.

In 2016 Mundulla was the subject of an episode of Back Roads.

== Heritage listings ==
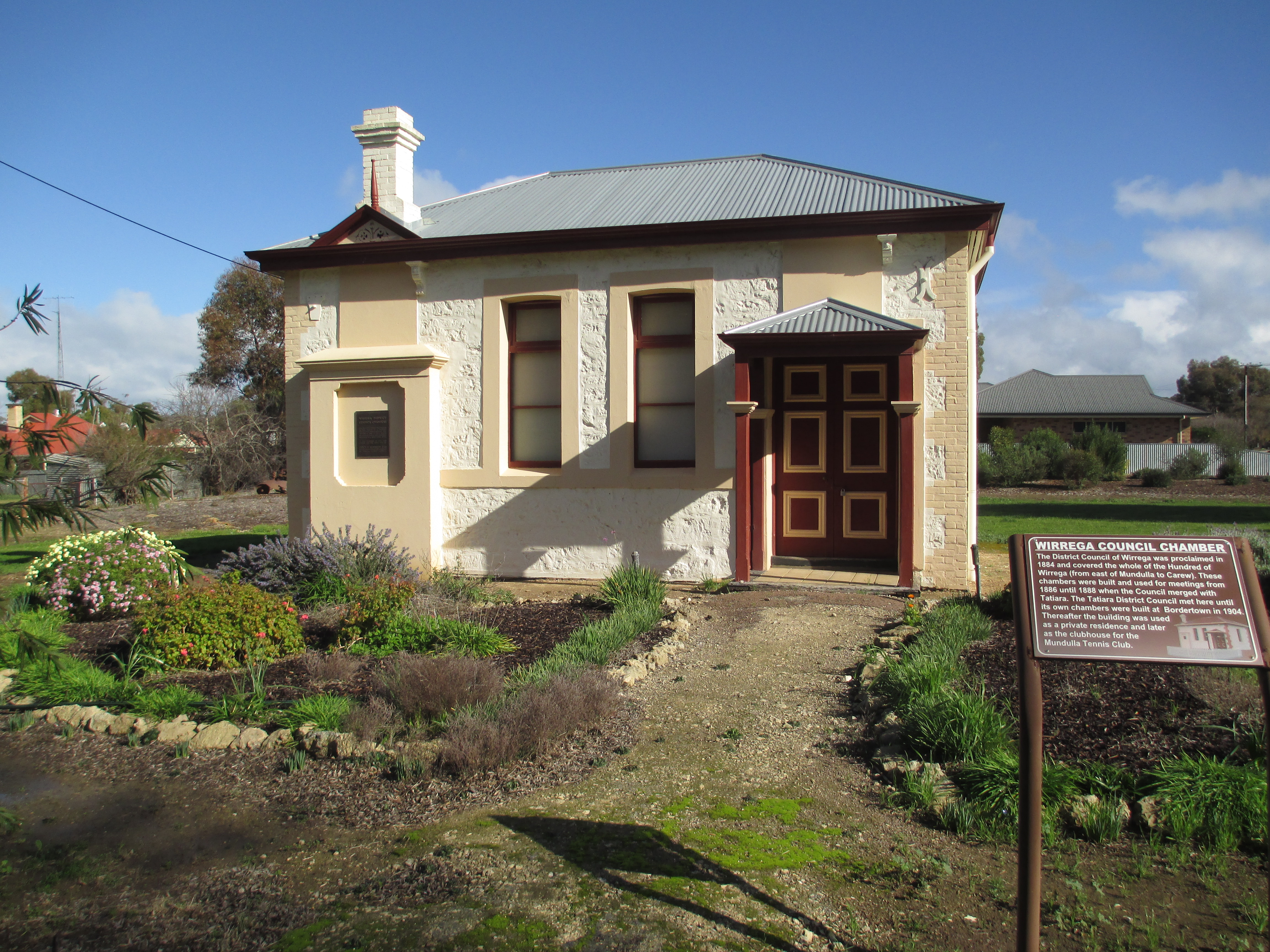
Former Wirrega council chambers photographed 2016

Mundulla has a number of heritage-listed sites, including:

- Lot 30 Jewell Street: Wirrega Council Chambers
- 22 Nalang Road: Old Mundulla Hotel

== Mundulla Yellows ==
Mundulla Yellows is a disease fatal to (especially) eucalypts, characterised by all leaves on a limb turning yellow then dying. It was first observed in this area in the 1970s, and has since been observed in every other State including Tasmania. Of unknown cause/s, it has several peculiar attributes: slow irreversible progression towards death and presence of unaffected trees among the dead and dying.
