= Thomas Burgoyne (Australian politician) =

Australian politician

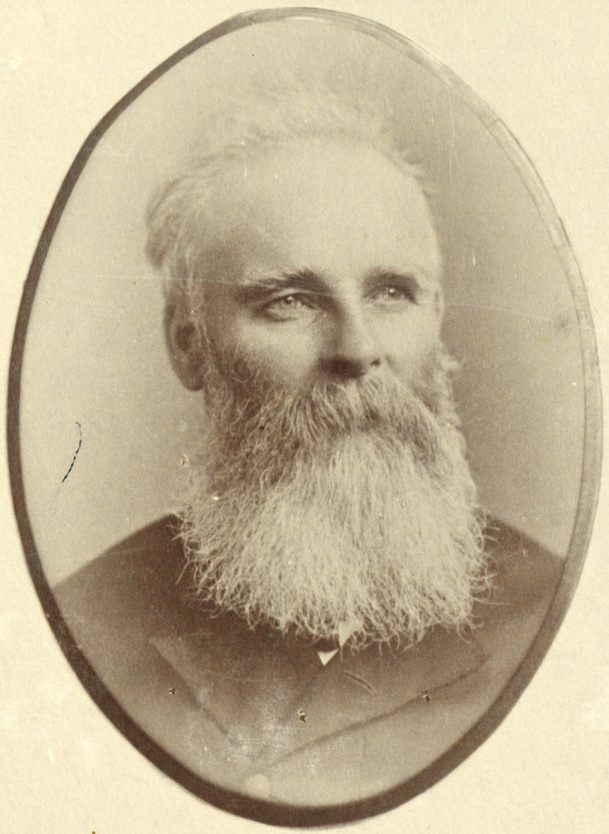

Thomas Burgoyne (10 June 1827 – 23 March 1920) was a builder and politician in the early days of the colony of South Australia.

== History ==
Burgoyne was born at Goab Farm (now, "The Gobe"), in the parish of Glaestrae (now, Gladestry), Radnorshire, Wales. He emigrated to South Australia, arriving on the Royal Sovereign in 1849. He set up business as a builder in Grote Street, but in 1852 joined the gold rush to Victoria. He returned around 1856 and moved to Port Augusta, which was then being settled by pastoralists. He soon had a thriving business as architect, surveyor, and builder, employing around a hundred workers. He erected the first permanent building in the township as well as numerous head stations, woolsheds and the like. In 1868 he became a surveyor for the Northern Road Board, and in 1875 was appointed town clerk of the Corporate Town of Port Augusta, a position he held until 1879. He founded the Port Augusta Dispatch and edited that paper for three years. He was elected councillor and in 1881 was elected mayor of Port Augusta.

He was a member of the South Australian House of Assembly from 1884 to 1915, representing Newcastle until 1902 and Flinders thereafter. In 1887 he was a member of the Railway Commission and the Defence Select Committee; he was Commissioner of Crown Lands and Immigration (1889–1890), Commissioner of Public Works in 1890, and Minister of Agriculture and Education for seven days in 1899. He had a reputation in Parliament as a logical, sound and persuasive debater, with great faith in the future of South Australia. He retired to his home at George Street Norwood, later moved to 83 Fullarton Road, Fullarton.

== Family ==
His first marriage was to Jane Lewis (c. 1827) in England, on 19 August 1848, which resulted in eleven children and ended in divorce in 1871.

- Twin sons, William and Arthur Burgoyne (c. 1849–1849) were born aboard Royal Sovereign.
- Mary Jane Burgoyne (1850–1854).
- Emma Burgoyne (1852 – 19 April 1884) married James Loudon, of Booboorowie, on 6 February 1883.
- Frederick Lewis Burgoyne (1853–1854) married Ellen Gardiner on 15 September 1883
- William Ferrier Burgoyne (1855–1858).
- Frederick George Burgoyne (1856–1890).
- Mary Elizabeth Burgoyne (1857–1857).
- Florence Jane Burgoyne (1858) married James Fabian Phillips on 3 July 1880.
- Frank Herbert Lewis Burgoyne (1860– ) married Ellen Gardiner ( –1929) in 1883
- Thomas Harold Burgoyne (1862–1862).

He married again, to Julia Frances Cotter (c. 1847 – 20 September 1909) on 30 September 1871. They had four sons:

- George Cotter Thomas Burgoyne (25 February 1875 – 1901)
- Geoffrey Lauderdale Burgoyne (30 April 1877 – ), editor of the Adelaide Daily Herald, The West Australian, then in 1924 the founding editor of the Hobart News, daughter publication of the Adelaide News. He married Aimee Louise Oldham in 1908

- Pauline Burgoyne (1909– )
- Gordon Geoffrey Burgoyne (1911 – 11 May 1992) Gordon was also a journalist
- Dudley Burgoyne, also a journalist

- Alfred William Burgoyne M.M. (3 June 1879 – 7 May 1918) died of wounds received in action.
- Hugh Vivian Burgoyne (12 April 1887 – 1966)

Political offices
Preceded by James Howe	Commissioner of Public Works; 1890	Succeeded by William Rounsevell
