= William Harvey (Australian politician) =

Australian politician

William Smith Harvey
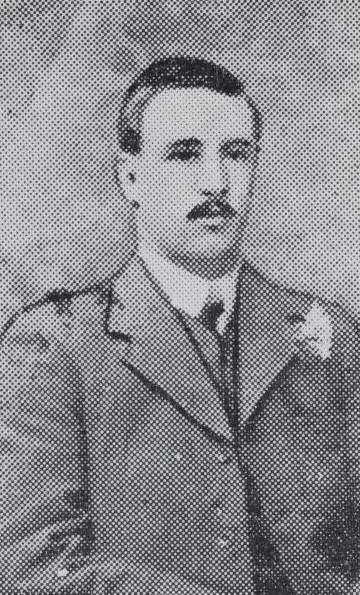

Member of the South Australian House of Assembly
- In office 1918–1933
- Constituency: Newcastle

Personal details
- Born: December 3, 1882 Newcastle, New South Wales, Australia
- Died: March 15, 1954 (aged 71)
- Occupation: Politician

William Smith Harvey (3 December 1882 – 15 March 1954) was an Australian politician. He who represented the South Australian House of Assembly multi-member seat of Newcastle from 1918 to 1933. He was a Labor member until the 1932 Labor split, when he was among the MPs to sit as part of the Parliamentary Labor Party, but lost his seat at the 1933 election.

== Biography ==
Harvey was born in Newcastle, New South Wales, the son of a blacksmith. He went to Western Australia at the age of thirteen and worked in the Kalgoorlie gold mines. He came to South Australia in 1910, where he became an organiser for the United Labourers Union and the Australian Workers' Union and worked on the Trans-Australian Railway. He was also the president of the Port Augusta branch of the Labor Party and the party's Newcastle electorate committee.

He was elected to the House of Assembly at the 1918 election for the Newcastle district, located in the southern Flinders Ranges. He had lost a by-election for the same seat in a 1917 by-election. In 1930, Lionel Hill attempted to appoint Harvey as an assistant minister pending a bill that would allow him to enlarge the size of his ministry, but the bill was blocked in the Legislative Council, forcing Harvey to resign. At that time, he had been working on addressing the needs of the unemployed camped along the Torrens River, resulting in several hundred of them being accommodated in the Jubilee Exhibition Building.

== Political career ==
In August 1931, he broke with the Labor Party as part of the 1931 Labor split over the Premiers' Plan. Although there was dispute over whether he personally had been expelled as he had been absent during the Premiers' Plan vote, he sat with the renegade Parliamentary Labor Party, consisting of the expelled Cabinet, and served as Acting Government Whip in the aftermath. In December, he was one of three PLP MPs to offer to assist federal Labor in the 1931 federal election campaign; however, official Labor threatened Andrew Lacey with retribution if he shared a platform with Harvey. In April 1932, he proposed a unity conference in conjunction with the federal Labor Party, but was rebuffed by the PLP caucus. In August, along with Thomas Butterfield, he publicly condemned the PLP's coalition with their previous opponents the Liberal Federation. However, he remained loyal to the PLP, and became secretary of their election organising committee. He was one of many MPs from the three Labor factions defeated at the 1933 election.

== Later life and legacy ==
Harvey returned to working as a labourer after his election defeat, and in 1941 was working as a munition worker at TJ Richards & Sons. He unsuccessfully contested a seat in the Legislative Council at the 1941 election. Harvey remained involved in the Australian Workers' Union after his electoral defeat, holding every electoral office except secretary. He was reported to be state returning officer of the union in 1952. He lived at Camden Park for many years. He died in an Adelaide private hospital in 1954.

Harvey's family life was marred by tragedy: he was reported to have had four sets of twins in six years, all of whom died, and a 12-year-old son, Ronald, died of tetanus in 1935. He was reported to have had five surviving children in 1941.
