= Hundred of Tatiara =

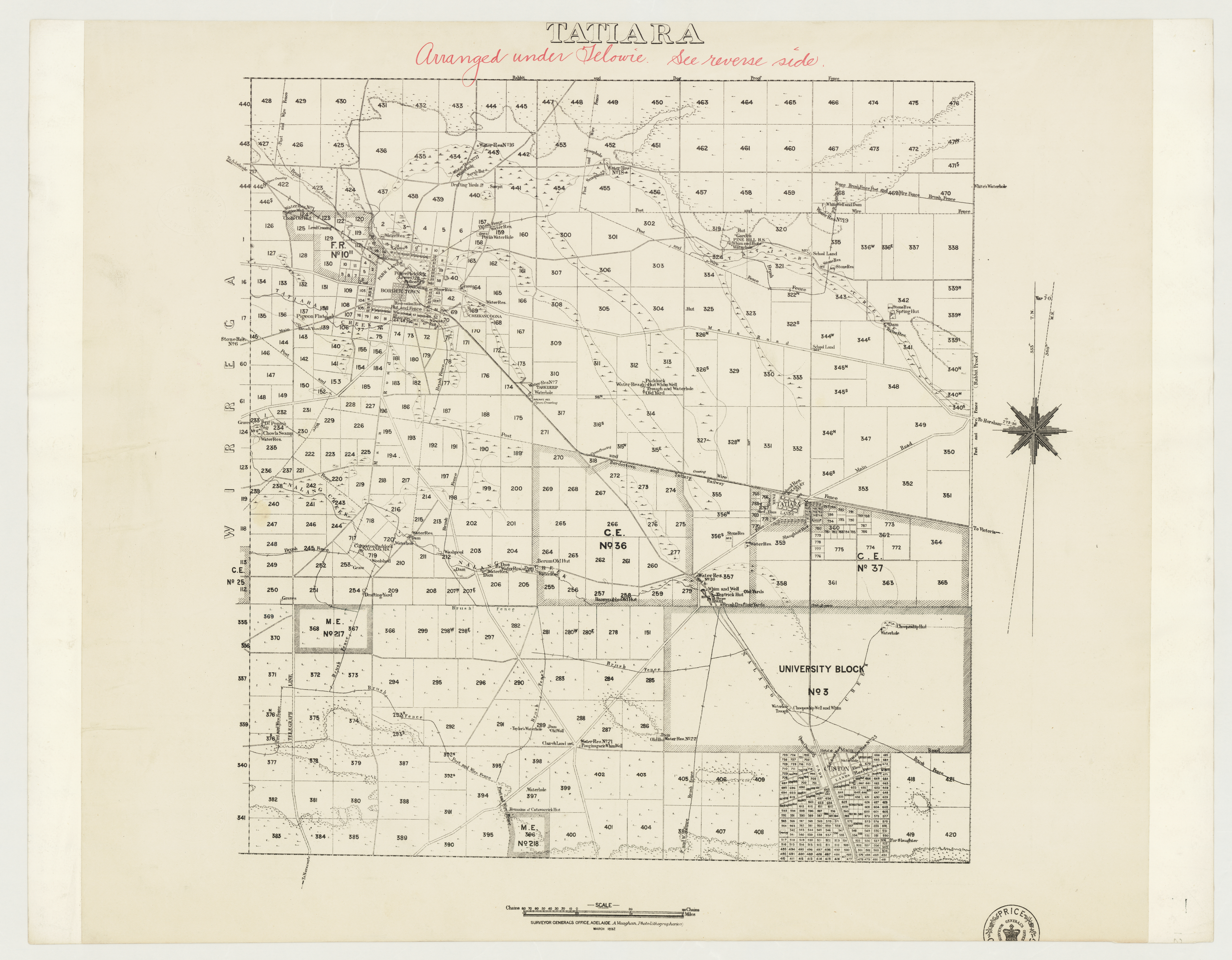
File:Hundred of Tatiara, 1892

The Hundred of Tatiara is a Hundred of the County of Buckingham centered on Bordertown, and Wolseley, South Australia.
