= George Jenkins (Australian politician) =

Australian politician

Sir George Frederick Jenkins KBE (24 June 1878 – 25 July 1957) was an Australian politician. He was a Liberal and Country League member of the South Australian House of Assembly, representing Burra Burra from 1918 to 1924, 1927 to 1930 and 1933 to 1938, and Newcastle from 1938 to 1956. He served as Minister for Agriculture and Town Planning (1922–23), Minister for Local Government and Marine (1923–24, 1927–30), Minister for Railways (1930), and Minister for Agriculture and Forests (1944–54).

Political offices
Preceded by Thomas Pascoe	Commissioner of Public Works; 1923 – 1924	Succeeded by Lionel Hill
