= Thomas Butterfield =

Australian politician

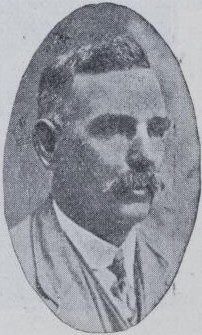

Thomas Butterfield (c. 1871 – 13 October 1943) was an Australian politician and minister in the South Australian Parliament.

== Political career ==
In 1910/11 Butterfield was a councillor for the Tumby Bay ward in the Tumby Bay Council and was made a Justice of the Peace.

Butterfield was elected to the state seat of Newcastle in the South Australian House of Assembly on 27 March 1915 and held the seat until resigning on 21 March 1917. He was re-elected to Newcastle on 6 April 1918 and held the seat until 7 April 1933.

Butterfield was Commissioner of Crown Lands, Minister of Afforestation and Minister of Agriculture in the Gunn Government from 16 April 1924. In September 1925 he opened the Department of Agriculture's Pavilion at the Wayville show grounds when His Excellency the Governor General (Lord Forster). In the Premier's speech Mr. Gunn said:

The provision of that building was due to the Minister of Agriculture (Hon. T. Butterfield), who had insisted that the best structure possible in the financial circumstances should be provided.

In the State election held on 10 February 1912, Thomas Butterfield was given Labor Party endorsement for the three Member House of Assembly District of Flinders, but he and his colleague, one of the sitting members were defeated.

Thomas Butterfield was appointed organizer for the United Labor Party in 1915.

In the 1915 election he was endorsed for the two-Member electorate of Newcastle and both he and his running mate, Andrew Kirkpatrick were elected.

In the 1916 Party plebiscite for the endorsement of three candidates for the Senate, a record 10,321 ballot papers were returned resulting in the election of Frank Lundie (A.W.U. Secretary) Thomas was second with 4,540 votes and Lionel Hill, who later became Premier, was third with 4,276 votes.

Thomas resigned his seat in the house of Assembly on 21 March 1917, to contest that year's Senate election, but was badly beaten by the team led by the former Labor Senator E.J.Guthrie, who was expelled for his support for conscription and then ran as a Nationalist. Guthrie polled 106,408 votes to the 79,541 votes polled by Thomas who topped Labor's Senate vote.

In the by-election held on 12 May 1917, caused by his resignation from Newcastle to contest the Senate election, the vacancy went to the Anti-Labor Candidate, Edward Twopeny.

Thomas was re-elected for Newcastle in the elections held in 1918, 1921, 1924, 1927 and 1930, but he and his running mate William Harvey, lost their seats in the 1933 election to Jim Beerworth and Lindsay Riches. He had joined the Premiers' Planners led by Lionel Hill and was expelled from the party in August 1931. He and the others who were expelled had formed a breakaway Party that they called the P.L.P. (Parliamentary Labor Party).

In 1922 Thomas, while still a member of the House of Assembly, contested the plebiscite for the Federal House of Representatives seat of Grey, which finally went to Andrew Lacey, who succeeded in defeating the sitting member, Alexander Poynton who had held the seat from 1903 until 1917.

In 1924 Thomas attempted to make a deal with the Leader of the Country Party, Malcolm McIntosh, under which the A.L.P. would give the Country Party a clear run for the Northern District of the South Australian Legislative Council in return for a written undertaking that the Country Party support the Labor Party against the Liberal Party in Parliament. The proposal was rejected.

== Post-political life ==
The highlight of his career was being sworn in as Commissioner of Crown Lands, Minister of Agriculture and Minister of Afforestation. (Gunn Government 1924) He was responsible for the re-organization of the instructorship of the branch of the Agriculture Department, establishment of the Dairy Dept. and the augment of the plantation of 3,000 acres (12 km^{2}) of pines a year, that has continued from that time.

Thomas was a pioneer farmer in the Wudinna area, he purchased sections 6 and 8 in the hundred of Wudinna (near Kyancutta) it is not clear if the family actually lived at Wudinna, but it is safe to say that the eldest children Honora and T. Harris were sent to Wudinna to get the farm set up and ready for the rest of the family. The Wudinna block was sold to the Spiers family in 1918.

In 1921 when Thomas and the family went to live at Johnberg on a grazing property that was purchased. T. Harris did not go with the family; he went to Yardea working as a station hand. Honora (Nora) married Michael Meers at Orroroo. George Polden first built the home on the property in 1879. It was a three-room stone hut, and later a fine three-room house was built in front of the original building. The name "BUTTERFIELDS" stuck with the home and in the 1970s Jeremy Browne restored the house to its original condition, he worked at weekends from Adelaide and in 1979 a plaque was unveiled for the Butterfield home centenary, Jack Butterfield attended. Thomas did not do too well out of grazing and in 1924 the property was sold back to the Luckraft's who still own it.

After Johnberg a home was bought at Athelstone and a farm in the Mallee with son Jack running it. After four years Thomas retired to the city home and Jack was forced off the land losing everything in 1938.
