= Wolseley, South Australia =

Wolseley
- Town
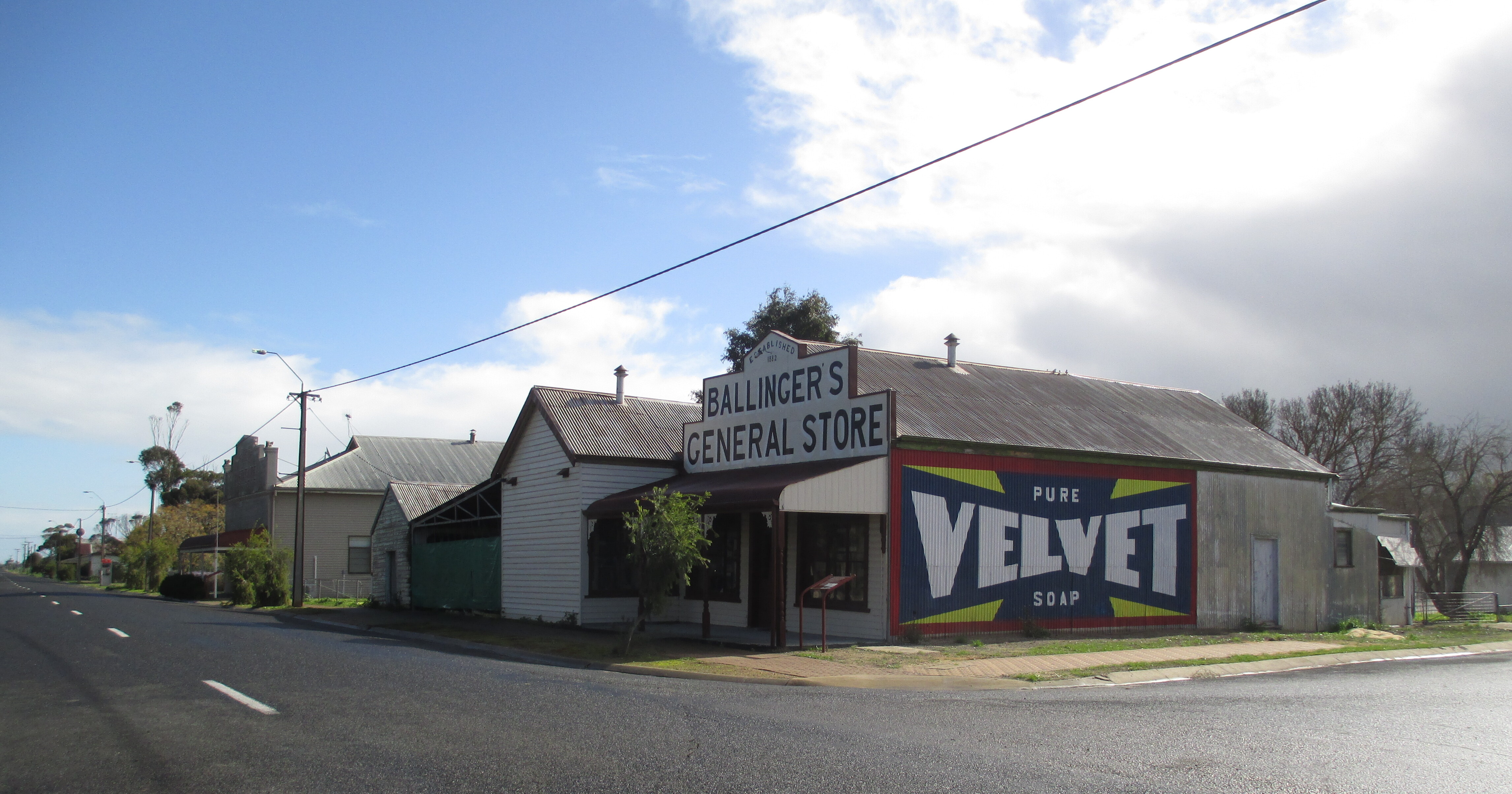
- Wolseley historic shop with restored advertising sign on the side

- Coordinates: 36°22′11″S 140°54′15″E
- Country: Australia
- State: South Australia
- Region: Limestone Coast
- LGA: Tatiara District Council
- Location: 289 km (180 mi) South East of Adelaide via; 17 km (11 mi) ESE of Bordertown
- Established: 8 May 1884 (town); 16 March 2000 (locality)

Government
  - State electorate: MacKillop
  - Federal division: Barker
- Elevation: 110 m (360 ft)

Population
  - Total: 180 (2016 census)
- Time zone: UTC+9:30 (ACST)
  - Summer (DST): UTC+10:30 (ACST)
- Postcode: 5269
- County: Buckingham
- Mean max temp: 21.5 °C (70.7 °F)
- Mean min temp: 8.6 °C (47.5 °F)
- Annual rainfall: 463 mm (18.2 in)
Localities around Wolseley
Pine Hill	Pine Hill
Bordertown; Pooginagoric	Wolseley	Serviceton
Pooginagoric	Pooginagoric; Custon

Wolseley (formerly Tatiara) is a small South Australian town near the Victorian border. It is five kilometres south of the Dukes Highway and 13 kilometres east of Bordertown. It was first proclaimed a town in 1884.

The 2016 Australian census which was conducted in August 2016 reports that Wolseley had a population of 180 people.

== History ==
The town was surveyed in 1884, and initially named Tatiara, which was described as an "Aboriginal word from the Jackegilbrab Tribe which HC Talbot states is divided into six clans (Kooinkill, Wirriga, Chala, Camiaguigara, Niall & Nunkoora)". The railway station was named after Lord Wolseley, who was the Commander-in-Chief of the British Army. The name of the town was changed to match the name of the station on 20 February 1941.

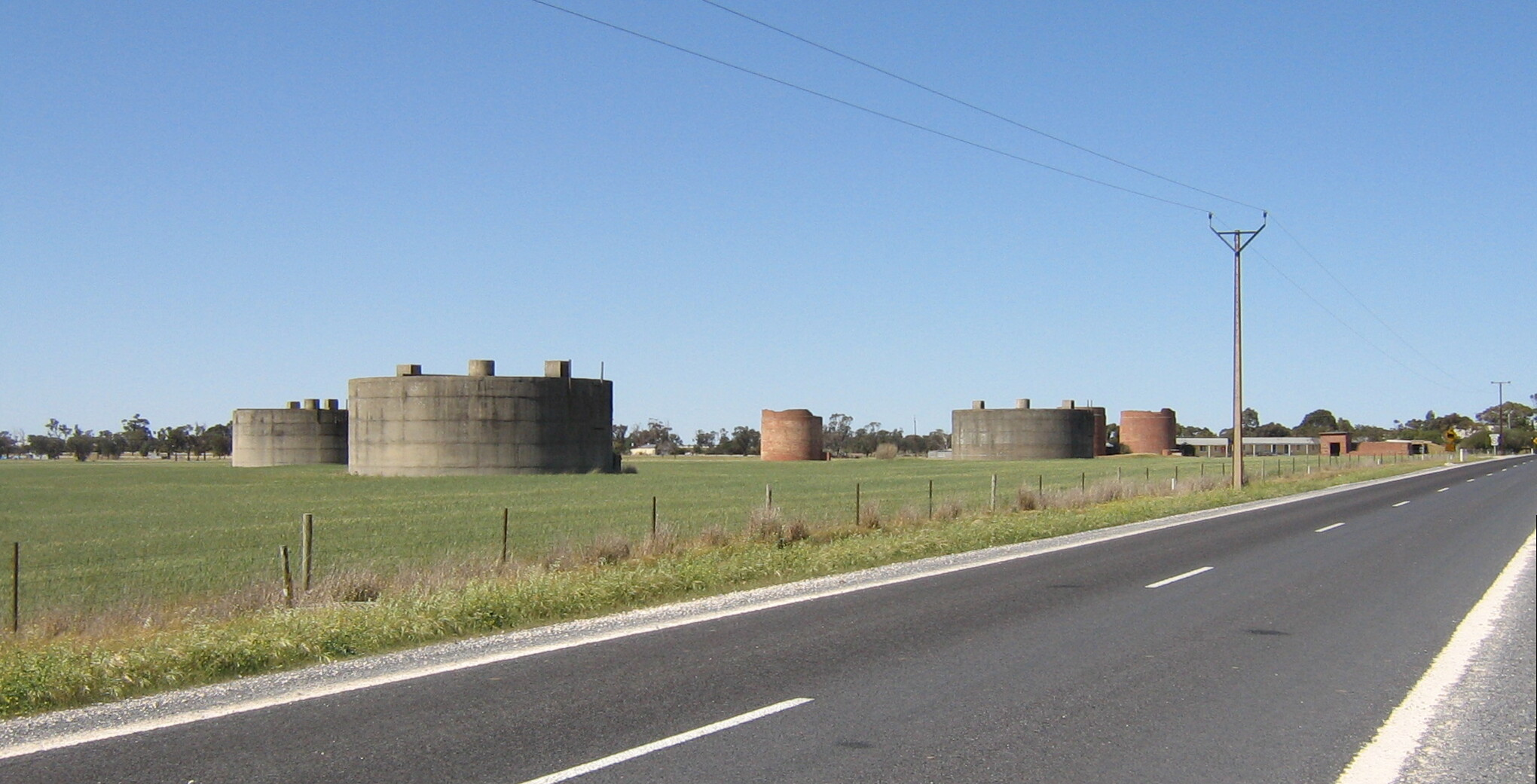
World War II fuel tanks of No. 12 Inland Aircraft Fuel Depot

Early in World War II, RAAF No. 12 Inland Aircraft Fuel Depot was established at Wolseley, with an initial capacity of 1.27 megalitres (280,000 imp gal; 340,000 US gal) in three tanks camouflaged to look like farm buildings. The depot started operations in 1942 and three additional tanks were added later. It was disbanded on 14 June 1944. It is listed on the South Australian Heritage Register as the Wolseley Inland Aircraft Fuel Depot.

== Railway ==
The Adelaide–Wolseley railway was opened from Adelaide east to Wolseley railway station in the early 1880s built to 1,600 mm (5 ft 3 in) broad gauge. The Serviceton railway line from Melbourne reached Serviceton in Victoria in 1886, and the three miles from Wolseley to Serviceton was completed by the South Australian Railways in 1887, completing a broad gauge rail link between Adelaide and Melbourne. Around the same time, the Mount Gambier railway line 1,067 mm (3 ft 6 in) narrow gauge railway extended to Wolseley station from the south, creating a break-of-gauge rail junction.

By May 1883, rail construction had not yet been completed, but trains were able to operate regularly from Bordertown on the Adelaide line and from Custon on the Mount Gambier line, continuing through Naracoorte to Kingston SE.

In 1881, the Government of South Australia authorised the construction of a 3 ft 6 in (1,067 mm) railway from "University Block No. 3" near the southern border of the Hundred of Tatiara to Border Town. It had previously authorised the construction from Naracoorte to that point in 1879.

In the 1950s the break-of-gauge was abolished by the conversion of the Mount Gambier line to broad gauge. The line to Mount Gambier has been out of use since the conversion of the Adelaide – Melbourne line to 1,435 mm (4 ft 8 1/2 in) standard gauge on 12 April 1995, pending possible conversion to standard gauge. If it is converted, it will become the first railway line in Australia to have ever been converted to all 3 gauges.

=== Railway containers ===
In 1936, to help overcome some of the inconveniences of the break of gauge, containers were introduced to allow though shipment of goods without the need for transshipment.

== Governance ==
Wolseley is located in the federal division of Barker, the state electoral district of MacKillop and the local government area of Tatiara District Council.

== See also ==
- Wolseley Common Conservation Park
