= Bordertown, South Australia =

Town in Australia

Bordertown
- Town
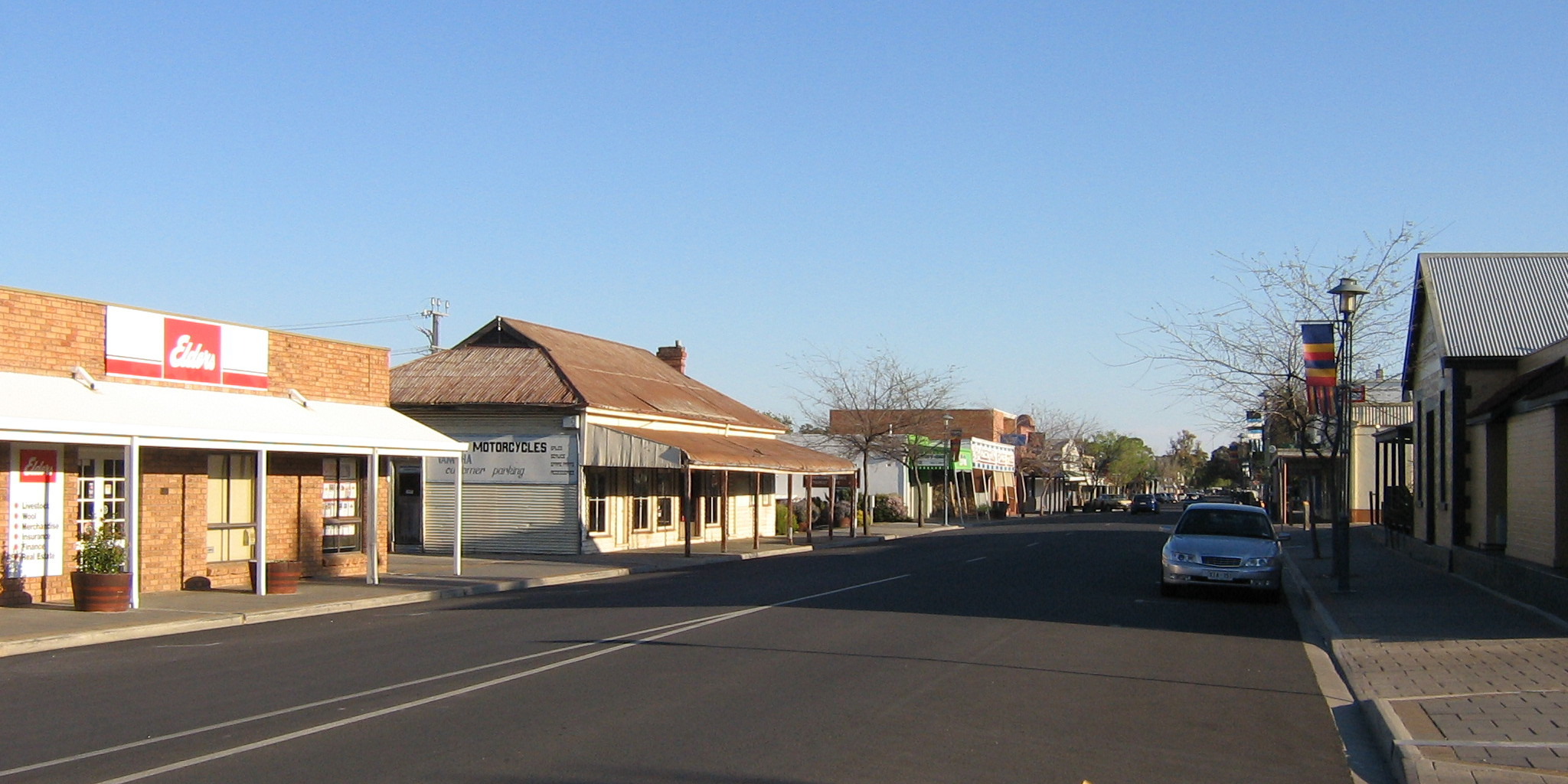
- Main street in Bordertown, 2006

- Coordinates: 36°18′42″S 140°46′13″E
- Country: Australia
- State: South Australia
- Region: Limestone Coast
- LGA: Tatiara District Council
- Location: 250 km (160 mi) SE of Adelaide; 457 km (284 mi) NW of Melbourne
- Established: 1852 (town); 16 March 2000 (locality)

Government
  - State electorate: MacKillop
  - Federal division: Barker
- Elevation: 82 m (269 ft)

Population
  - Total: 3,095 (2021 census)
- Time zone: UTC+9:30 (ACST)
  - Summer (DST): UTC+10:30 (ACST)
- Postcode: 5268
- County: Buckingham
- Mean max temp: 22.3 °C (72.1 °F)
- Mean min temp: 9.1 °C (48.4 °F)
- Annual rainfall: 460.7 mm (18.14 in)
Localities around Bordertown
Cannawigara	Senior	Senior
Cannawigara; Mundulla	Bordertown	Pine Hill; Wolseley
Mundulla	Bordertown South; Pooginagoric	Pooginagoric
- Locations; Adjoining localities

Bordertown, formerly Border Town, is a town and locality in the Australian state of South Australia, located in the state's east near the state border with Victoria, and about 250 kilometres (160 mi) east of the state capital of Adelaide. It is where the Dukes Highway, and the railway line between Adelaide and Melbourne, the capital of Victoria, cross Tatiara Creek.

Bordertown is the commercial and administrative centre of the Tatiara District Council. Tatiara is the local Indigenous word for "Good Country".

== History ==
Bordertown was established in 1852 when a direct route across the Ninety Mile Desert was being planned for gold escorts from the Victorian goldfields to Adelaide. Police Inspector Alexander Tolmer was instructed to create a town as close as practical to the border. Tolmer was upset when the town was not named after him, but that was made up for by naming several sites around Bordertown after him, such as Tolmer Park and Tolmer Takeaway. Land was first offered for sale in the new government town on 28 August 1852.

It was officially known as Border Town until 5 April 1979 when its name was changed to Bordertown.

Boundaries for the locality were created on 16 March 2000 and give the long established name and include the Government Town of Bordertown.

Bordertown is also the birthplace of former Prime Minister of Australia, Bob Hawke.

== Governance ==
Bordertown is located in the state electoral district of MacKillop, the federal Division of Barker, the local government area of the Tatiara District Council and the South Australian government region of the Limestone Coast.

== Landmarks ==
Bordertown is home to the historic Clayton Farm Heritage Museum. It is also famous for its white Kangaroos which have been bred for zoos and animal shelters around Australia. The lightning clock on the main street marks the site of the first electricity source.

=== Heritage listings ===
Bordertown has a number of heritage-listed sites, including:

- Clayton Farm Road: Clayton Farm Complex
- Hay Avenue: Bordertown railway station
- Woolshed Street: Bordertown Institute

== Economy ==
The district's economy is based primarily on agriculture, with cereal crops and livestock farming. The largest single employer is the JBS meatworks abattoir which processes up to 8000 animals per day and employs around 470 people. Almost two-thirds of the employees are migrants to Australia, including refugees and skilled migrants on 457 visas, from a total of at least 23 different home culture groups.

== Media ==
=== Newspapers ===
Bordertown's major newspaper, The Border Chronicle, is a local publication that was first printed on 13 June 1908. The newspaper's first building, at DeCourcey Street, was auctioned in November 2017, after Fairfax Media scaled back newspaper operations and closed the Chronicle's commercial printing business and office.

Prior to this, the other historical newspaper in the town was the Tatiara Mail which was founded in 1880 by Melbourne Mott (whose father owned The Hamilton Spectator in Victoria) and Michael Murphy. In 1888, the press moved to Nhill and was eventually sold to EJ Stephens of the Nhill Free Press, with the title evolving over time:

- Tatiara Mail and West Wimmera Advertiser (28 August 1880 – 30 March 1888)
- Nhill and Tatiara Mail and West Wimmera Advertiser (7 April 1888 – 2 February 1895)
- Nhill Mail (6 February 1895 – 29 December 1900) – before being absorbed into the Nhill Free Press (1882–1982) in Victoria

A later publication was the Tatiara and Lawloit News (13 June 1908 – 15 June 1912). It was printed in Naracoorte, and was eventually absorbed by the Narracoorte Herald.

=== Television ===
- The Australian Broadcasting Corporation (ABC) – ABC TV, ABC TV Plus, ABC Me, ABC News (digital channels)
- The Special Broadcasting Service (SBS) – SBS, SBS Viceland, SBS Food, NITV, SBS WorldWatch, SBS World Movies (digital channels)
- WIN Television (7, 7two, 7mate, 9, 9Gem, 9Go!, 10, 10 Comedy, 10 Drama) as SES-8, SDS, MGS– SES-8 relays the programming from Seven Network (Seven SA, 7two, 7mate), SDS relays the programming from Nine Network (Nine SA, 9Gem, 9Go!) & MGS relays the programming from Network 10 (10, 10 Comedy, 10 Drama).
- Foxtel – Subscription Television service Foxtel is also available via satellite.

WIN Television broadcasts Nine Network programming, Channel Seven broadcasts Seven Network programming & Channel Ten broadcasts Network 10 programming. The programming schedules for these channels is the same as Channel Nine, Channel Seven and Channel Ten in Adelaide, with local commercials inserted and some variations for coverage of Australian Football League or National Rugby League matches, state and national news and current affairs programs, some lifestyle and light entertainment shows and infomercials.

=== Radio ===
Community

- Connect FM (formerly 5TCB FM) (106.1 FM)
- Vision Christian Radio (88.0 FM)

Connect FM, formerly known as 5TCB FM is the local community station, broadcasting local programs, presented by radio announcers. The station is skewed towards the younger and older demographics and plays a lot of music. All programs are locally produced apart from the regular programming the station takes flagship music program Melomania, as well as hourly local, world, state and national news bulletins, Matty's Hot 30 Countdown, Essential 80's Show and The Hype. The community station officially became a fully licensed station on 17 March in 1986.

== Transport ==
Bordertown is on the Dukes Highway and the Melbourne–Adelaide railway, the main routes by road and rail between Adelaide and Melbourne. There are several bus services daily towards each of Adelaide, Melbourne, and Mount Gambier. The Overland train stops twice a week each way and is the only passenger train that still serves Bordertown after Australian National ceased country passenger rail services in South Australia in the 1980s. Most rail traffic is freight passing through, although the local grain silos are also served by rail. In 2012, the crossing loop at Bordertown railway station was lengthened to 1,500 metres (4,900 ft).

== See also ==
- Bordertown High School
