= Electoral results for the district of Murray (South Australia) =

South Australian district election results

This is a list of election results for the electoral district of Murray in South Australian elections.

== Members for Murray ==
First incarnation (1902–1938, 3 members)
Member	Party	Term	Member	Party	Term	Member	Party	Term
Walter Duncan	National League	1902–1906	Friedrich Pflaum		1902–1905	Robert Homburg	National League	1902–1905
Walter Duncan	National League	1902–1906	Friedrich Pflaum	National League	1905–1910	William Jamieson	National League	1905–1906
Hermann Homburg	National League	1906–1910	Friedrich Pflaum	National League	1905–1910	William Jamieson	Liberal and Democratic	1906–1910
Hermann Homburg	Liberal Union	1910–1915	Friedrich Pflaum	Liberal Union	1910–1915	William Jamieson	Liberal Union	1910–1912
Hermann Homburg	Liberal Union	1910–1915	Friedrich Pflaum	Liberal Union	1910–1915	Harry Young	Liberal Union	1912–1923
George Dunn	Labor	1915–1917	Maurice Parish	Labor	1915–1917	Harry Young	Liberal Union	1912–1923
George Dunn	National	1917–1918	Maurice Parish	National	1917–1918	Harry Young	Liberal Union	1912–1923
George Dunn	National	1917–1918	Maurice Parish	Independent	1918–1918	Harry Young	Liberal Union	1912–1923
Sid O'Flaherty	Labor	1918–1921	Herbert Parsons	Liberal Union	1918–1921	Harry Young	Liberal Union	1912–1923
John Godfree	Liberal Union	1921–1923	John Randell	Liberal Union	1921–1923	Harry Young	Liberal Union	1912–1923
John Godfree	Liberal Federation	1923–1924	John Randell	Liberal Federation	1923–1924	Harry Young	Liberal Federation	1923–1927
Clement Collins	Labor	1924–1933	Frank Staniford	Labor	1924–1927	Harry Young	Liberal Federation	1923–1927
Clement Collins	Labor	1924–1933	Ernest Hannaford	Liberal Federation	1927–1930	Hermann Homburg	Liberal Federation	1927–1930
Clement Collins	Labor	1924–1933	Frank Staniford	Labor	1930–1931	Robert Hunter	Labor	1930–1931
Clement Collins	Parliamentary Labor	1931–1933	Frank Staniford	Parliamentary Labor	1931–1933	Robert Hunter	Parliamentary Labor	1931–1933
George Morphett	Liberal and Country	1933–1938	Thomas Playford IV	Liberal and Country	1933–1938	Howard Shannon	Liberal and Country	1933–1938
Second incarnation (1938–1977)
Member	Party	Term						
Richard McKenzie	Independent	1938–1943						
Richard McKenzie	Labor	1943–1953						
Hector White	Liberal and Country	1953–1956						
Gabe Bywaters	Labor	1956–1968						
Ivon Wardle	Liberal and Country	1968–1974						
Ivon Wardle	Liberal	1974–1977						
David Wotton	Liberal	1977–1985						

== Election results ==
=== Elections in the 1980s ===
1982 South Australian state election: Murray
Party	Candidate	Votes	%	±%
Liberal	David Wotton	9,959	58.5	−4.3
Labor	Geoffrey McCulloch	6,326	37.1	+5.4
Democrats	Gerhard Weissmann	743	4.4	−1.1
Total formal votes		17,028	94.5	−1.7
Informal votes		988	5.5	+1.7
Turnout		18,016	94.3	+0.8
Two-party-preferred result
Liberal	David Wotton	10,327	60.6	−5.3
Labor	Geoffrey McCulloch	6,701	39.4	+5.3
Liberal hold		Swing	−5.3	

=== Elections in the 1970s ===
1979 South Australian state election: Murray
Party	Candidate	Votes	%	±%
Liberal	David Wotton	10,180	62.8	+30.8
Labor	Jack Pitcher	5,137	31.7	−4.2
Democrats	Gerhard Weissmann	900	5.5	+5.5
Total formal votes		16,217	96.2	−1.9
Informal votes		634	3.8	+1.9
Turnout		16,851	93.5	−0.4
Two-party-preferred result
Liberal	David Wotton	10,693	65.9	+5.9
Labor	Jack Pitcher	5,524	34.1	−5.9
Liberal hold		Swing	+5.9	

1977 South Australian state election: Murray
Party	Candidate	Votes	%	±%
Labor	Douglas Gerrie	5,734	35.9	+1.8
Liberal	David Wotton	5,121	32.0	−20.2
Independent Liberal	Ivon Wardle	4,886	30.6	+30.6
Independent	Maurice Thiele	243	1.5	+1.5
Total formal votes		15,984	98.1	
Informal votes		305	1.9	
Turnout		16,289	93.9	
Two-party-preferred result
Liberal	David Wotton	9,595	60.0	−3.0
Labor	Douglas Gerrie	6,389	40.0	+3.0
Liberal hold		Swing	−3.0	

1975 South Australian state election: Murray
Party	Candidate	Votes	%	±%
Liberal	Ivon Wardle	6,078	54.4	−2.9
Labor	Harold McLaren	4,110	36.8	−5.9
Liberal Movement	Darian Monjean	647	5.8	+5.8
Independent	John Potts	197	1.8	+1.8
National	Beryl Moreton	137	1.2	+1.2
Total formal votes		11,169	96.9	−0.7
Informal votes		361	3.1	+0.7
Turnout		11,530	95.0	−0.9
Two-party-preferred result
Liberal	Ivon Wardle	6,925	62.0	+4.7
Labor	Harold McLaren	4,244	38.0	−4.7
Liberal hold		Swing	+4.7	

1973 South Australian state election: Murray
Party	Candidate	Votes	%	±%
Liberal and Country	Ivon Wardle	5,929	57.3	+7.2
Labor	Harold McLaren	4,421	42.7	−4.2
Total formal votes		10,350	97.6	−1.0
Informal votes		253	2.4	+1.0
Turnout		10,603	95.9	−0.7
Liberal and Country hold		Swing	+5.1	

1970 South Australian state election: Murray
Party	Candidate	Votes	%	±%
Liberal and Country	Ivon Wardle	4,916	50.1	
Labor	Gabe Bywaters	4,601	46.9	
Democratic Labor	Terence Critchley	174	1.8	
Independent	Clarence Tucker	119	1.2	
Total formal votes		9,810	98.6	
Informal votes		143	1.4	
Turnout		9,953	96.6	
Two-party-preferred result
Liberal and Country	Ivon Wardle	5,124	52.2	
Labor	Gabe Bywaters	4,686	47.8	
Liberal and Country hold		Swing		

=== Elections in the 1960s ===
1968 South Australian state election: Murray
Party	Candidate	Votes	%	±%
Labor	Gabe Bywaters	4,051	49.0	−18.1
Liberal and Country	Ivon Wardle	4,044	48.9	+16.0
Democratic Labor	Terence Critchley	178	2.1	+2.1
Total formal votes		8,273	98.3	+0.2
Informal votes		142	1.7	−0.2
Turnout		8,415	96.4	+0.1
Two-party-preferred result
Liberal and Country	Ivon Wardle	4,157	50.2	+17.3
Labor	Gabe Bywaters	4,116	49.8	−17.3
Liberal and Country gain from Labor		Swing	+17.3	

1965 South Australian state election: Murray
Party	Candidate	Votes	%	±%
Labor	Gabe Bywaters	5,144	67.1	−3.5
Liberal and Country	Eric Doecke	2,522	32.9	+3.5
Total formal votes		7,666	98.1	−0.3
Informal votes		152	1.9	+0.3
Turnout		7,818	96.3	0.0
Labor hold		Swing	−3.5	

1962 South Australian state election: Murray
Party	Candidate	Votes	%	±%
Labor	Gabe Bywaters	5,263	70.6	+5.8
Liberal and Country	Clement Wilkin	2,192	29.4	−3.9
Total formal votes		7,455	98.4	−0.2
Informal votes		122	1.6	+0.2
Turnout		7,577	96.3	0.0
Labor hold		Swing	+5.5	

=== Elections in the 1950s ===
1959 South Australian state election: Murray
Party	Candidate	Votes	%	±%
Labor	Gabe Bywaters	4,576	64.8	+13.4
Liberal and Country	Arnold Royal	2,353	33.3	−15.3
Democratic Labor	Susan Critchley	130	1.8	+1.8
Total formal votes		7,059	98.6	+0.1
Informal votes		101	1.4	−0.1
Turnout		7,160	96.3	+0.2
Two-party-preferred result
Labor	Gabe Bywaters		65.1	+13.7
Liberal and Country	Arnold Royal		34.9	−13.7
Labor hold		Swing	+13.7	

- Two party preferred vote was estimated.

1956 South Australian state election: Murray
Party	Candidate	Votes	%	±%
Labor	Gabe Bywaters	3,533	51.4	
Liberal and Country	Hector White	3,340	48.6	
Total formal votes		6,873	98.5	
Informal votes		104	1.5	
Turnout		6,977	96.1	
Labor gain from Liberal and Country		Swing		

1953 South Australian state election: Murray
Party	Candidate	Votes	%	±%
Liberal and Country	Hector White	3,026	45.1	−4.1
Labor	Robert Moroney	2,220	33.1	−17.7
Independent	Lawrence McKenzie	773	11.5	+11.5
Independent	Albert Denman	685	10.2	+10.2
Total formal votes		6,704	97.2	−1.1
Informal votes		194	2.8	+1.1
Turnout		6,898	96.8	+1.4
Two-party-preferred result
Liberal and Country	Hector White	3,385	50.5	+1.3
Labor	Robert Moroney	3,319	49.5	−1.3
Liberal and Country gain from Labor		Swing	+1.3	

1950 South Australian state election: Murray
Party	Candidate	Votes	%	±%
Labor	Richard McKenzie	3,247	50.8	−4.6
Liberal and Country	Hector White	3,143	49.2	+4.6
Total formal votes		6,390	98.3	−0.2
Informal votes		108	1.7	+0.2
Turnout		6,498	95.4	−0.5
Labor hold		Swing	−4.6	

=== Elections in the 1940s ===
1947 South Australian state election: Murray
Party	Candidate	Votes	%	±%
Labor	Richard McKenzie	3,386	55.4	−1.8
Liberal and Country	Maurice Parish	2,731	44.6	+7.4
Total formal votes		6,117	98.5	+1.1
Informal votes		92	1.5	−1.1
Turnout		6,209	95.9	+5.4
Labor hold		Swing	N/A	

1944 South Australian state election: Murray
Party	Candidate	Votes	%	±%
Labor	Richard McKenzie	3,177	57.2	+41.1
Liberal and Country	John Cowan	2,068	37.2	+7.9
Independent	James Venning	308	5.6	+5.6
Total formal votes		5,553	97.4	−1.2
Informal votes		146	2.6	+1.2
Turnout		5,699	90.5	+25.9
Labor gain from Independent Labor		Swing	N/A	

1941 South Australian state election: Murray
Party	Candidate	Votes	%	±%
Independent Labor	Richard McKenzie	2,187	54.6	+20.5
Liberal and Country	George Morphett	1,173	29.3	−3.7
Labor	Clement Collins	647	16.1	+2.8
Total formal votes		4,007	98.6	+0.2
Informal votes		57	1.4	−0.2
Turnout		4,064	64.6	−5.1
Independent hold		Swing	N/A	

- Preferences were not distributed.

=== Elections in the 1930s ===
1938 South Australian state election: Murray
Party	Candidate	Votes	%	±%
Independent Labor	Richard McKenzie	1,494	34.1	
Liberal and Country	George Morphett	1,445	33.0	
Independent	P H Suter	858	19.6	
Labor	John Cassidy	583	13.3	
Total formal votes		4,380	98.4	
Informal votes		72	1.6	
Turnout		4,452	69.7	
Two-candidate-preferred result
Independent	Richard McKenzie	2,434	55.6	
Liberal and Country	George Morphett	1,946	44.4	
Independent gain from Liberal and Country		Swing		
