= Results of the 1930 South Australian state election (House of Assembly) =

South Australian state election, 5 April 1930 House of Assembly << 1927–1933 >>
Enrolled voters	325,244				
Votes cast	222,819		Turnout	71.36%	–6.07%
Informal votes	12,715		Informal	5.71%	
Summary of votes by party
Party	Primary votes	%	Swing	Seats	Change
Labor	102,194	48.64%	+0.65%	30	+ 14
Liberal Federation	74,930	35.66%	–4.34%	13	– 10
Country	14,555	6.93%	+1.43%	2	– 3
Single Tax League	2,777	1.32%	+1.32%	1	+ 1
Communist	696	0.33%	+0.33%	0	± 0
Independent	14,952	7.11%	+0.57%	0	± 0
Total	210,104			46	

This is a list of House of Assembly results for the 1930 South Australian state election. Each district elected multiple members.

== Results by electoral district ==
=== Adelaide ===
1930 South Australian state election: Adelaide
Party	Candidate	Votes	%	±%
Labor	Bill Denny (elected)	5,761	81.7	
Labor	Bert Edwards (elected)	317	4.5	
Labor	Herbert George (elected)	241	3.4	
Independent Labor	Alfred Wilson	401	5.7	
Communist	James Cullen	336	4.8	
Total formal votes		7,056	92.2	
Informal votes		597	7.8	
Turnout		7,653	58.9	
Party total votes
Labor		6,319	89.6	
Independent Labor	Alfred Wilson	401	5.7	
Communist		336	4.8	

=== Albert ===
1930 South Australian state election: Albert
Party	Candidate	Votes	%	±%
Liberal Federation	Malcolm McIntosh (elected)	3,613	36.7	
Liberal Federation	Frederick McMillan (elected)	256	2.6	
Labor	Henry Dalziel	3,303	33.5	
Labor	Richard McKenzie	416	4.2	
Country	Arthur Petch	1,799	18.3	
Country	Ernest Rowe	461	4.7	
Total formal votes		9,848	94.1	
Informal votes		612	5.9	
Turnout		10,460	74.0	
Party total votes
Liberal Federation		3,869	39.3	
Labor		3,719	37.8	
Country		2,260	22.9	

=== Alexandra ===
1930 South Australian state election: Alexandra
Party	Candidate	Votes	%	±%
Liberal Federation	Percy Heggaton (elected)	3,209	42.3	
Liberal Federation	Herbert Hudd (elected)	946	12.5	
Liberal Federation	George Laffer (elected)	635	8.4	
Country	Frederick Ayers	1,936	25.5	
Country	William Scarborough	508	6.7	
Country	Lindsay Yelland	352	4.6	
Total formal votes		7,586	91.5	
Informal votes		706	8.5	
Turnout		8,292	61.4	
Party total votes
Liberal Federation		4,790	63.1	
Country		2,796	36.9	

=== Barossa ===
1930 South Australian state election: Barossa
Party	Candidate	Votes	%	±%
Labor	George Cooke (elected)	4,114	43.0	
Labor	Thomas Edwards (elected)	235	2.5	
Labor	Leonard Hopkins (elected)	116	1.2	
Liberal Federation	Henry Crosby	3,276	34.2	
Liberal Federation	Herbert Lyons	299	3.1	
Independent	Herbert Basedow	1,383	14.5	
People	Richard Thompson	80	0.8	
People	Horace Barnes	66	0.7	
Total formal votes		9,569	93.5	
Informal votes		666	6.5	
Turnout		10,235	78.5	
Party total votes
Labor		4,465	46.7	
Liberal Federation		3,575	37.4	
Independent	Herbert Basedow	1,383	14.5	
People		146	1.5	

=== Burra Burra ===
1930 South Australian state election: Burra Burra
Party	Candidate	Votes	%	±%
Labor	Jack Critchley (elected)	3,983	41.0	
Labor	Sydney McHugh (elected)	990	10.2	
Labor	Even George (elected)	144	1.5	
Liberal Federation	George Jenkins	3,604	37.1	
Liberal Federation	Reginald Carter	575	5.9	
Liberal Federation	Philip McBride	413	4.3	
Total formal votes		9,709	93.8	
Informal votes		636	6.2	
Turnout		10,345	78.3	
Party total votes
Labor		5,117	52.7	
Liberal Federation		4,592	47.3	

=== East Torrens ===
1930 South Australian state election: East Torrens
Party	Candidate	Votes	%	±%
Labor	Beasley Kearney (elected)	11,240	44.8	
Labor	Frank Nieass (elected)	864	3.5	
Labor	Arthur McArthur (elected)	460	1.8	
Liberal Federation	Frederick Coneybeer	10,426	41.6	
Liberal Federation	Walter Hamilton	1,538	6.1	
Liberal Federation	Albert Sutton	541	2.2	
Total formal votes		25,069	94.7	
Informal votes		1,389	5.3	
Turnout		26,458	69.9	
Party total votes
Labor		12,564	50.1	
Liberal Federation		12,505	49.9	

=== Flinders ===
1930 South Australian state election: Flinders
Party	Candidate	Votes	%	±%
Single Tax League	Edward Craigie (elected)	2,777	34.0	
Liberal Federation	James Moseley (elected)	1,927	23.6	
Liberal Federation	Alfred Barns	518	6.4	
Labor	Myles Cronin	1,014	12.4	
Labor	David Whait	340	4.2	
Country	Edwin Barraud	511	6.3	
Country	Albert Wishart	311	3.8	
Independent Labor	John O'Connor	763	9.4	
Total formal votes		8,161	95.6	
Informal votes		377	4.4	
Turnout		8,538	70.6	
Party total votes
Single Tax League		2,777	34.0	
Liberal Federation		2,445	30.0	
Labor		1,354	16.6	
Country		822	10.1	
Independent Labor	John O'Connor	763	9.4	

=== Murray ===
1930 South Australian state election: Murray
Party	Candidate	Votes	%	±%
Liberal Federation	Hermann Homburg	2,436	26.8	
Liberal Federation	Ernest Hannaford	1,061	11.7	
Liberal Federation	George Morphett	1,027	11.3	
Labor	Clement Collins (elected)	3,622	29.8	
Labor	Frank Staniford (elected)	613	6.7	
Labor	Robert Hunter (elected)	81	0.9	
Independent	Raphael Cilento	264	2.9	
Total formal votes		9,104	91.4	
Informal votes		857	8.6	
Turnout		9,961	75.3	
Party total votes
Liberal Federation		4,524	49.7	
Labor		4,316	47.4	
Independent	Raphael Cilento	264	2.9	

=== Newcastle ===
1930 South Australian state election: Newcastle
Party	Candidate	Votes	%	±%
Labor	Thomas Butterfield (elected)	unopposed		
Labor	William Harvey (elected)	unopposed		

=== North Adelaide ===
1930 South Australian state election: North Adelaide
Party	Candidate	Votes	%	±%
Labor	Frederick Birrell (elected)	6,953	45.9	
Labor	Walter Warne (elected)	977	6.5	
Liberal Federation	Shirley Jeffries	5,955	39.3	
Liberal Federation	Victor Newland	1,265	8.4	
Total formal votes		15,150	97.0	
Informal votes		465	3.0	
Turnout		15,615	72.4	
Party total votes
Labor		7,930	52.4	
Liberal Federation		7,220	47.6	

=== Port Adelaide ===
1930 South Australian state election: Port Adelaide
Party	Candidate	Votes	%	±%
Labor	John Jonas (elected)	13,460	68.5	
Labor	Albert Thompson (elected)	2,073	10.5	
Independent Labor	Harold Butler	3,544	18.0	
Independent Labor	Joshua Pedlar	588	3.0	
Total formal votes		19,665	95.0	
Informal votes		1,024	5.0	
Turnout		20,689	70.8	
Party total votes
Labor		15,533	79.0	
Independent Labor		4,132	21.0	

=== Port Pirie ===
1930 South Australian state election: Port Pirie
Party	Candidate	Votes	%	±%
Labor	Lionel Hill (elected)	unopposed		
Labor	John Fitzgerald (elected)	unopposed		

=== Stanley ===
1930 South Australian state election: Stanley
Party	Candidate	Votes	%	±%
Liberal Federation	John Lyons (elected)	2,802	43.1	
Liberal Federation	Robert Nicholls (elected)	914	14.1	
Country	Oliver Badman	2,512	38.6	
Country	Henry Sargent	273	4.2	
Total formal votes		6,501	94.9	
Informal votes		346	5.1	
Turnout		6,847	73.7	
Party total votes
Liberal Federation		3,716	57.2	
Country		2,785	42.8	

=== Sturt ===
1930 South Australian state election: Sturt
Party	Candidate	Votes	%	±%
Labor	Bob Dale (elected)	16,116	47.1	
Labor	Thomas Grealy	1,218	3.6	
Labor	Edgar Dawes (elected)	511	1.5	
Liberal Federation	Ernest Anthoney (elected)	13,034	38.1	
Liberal Federation	Herbert Richards	1,413	4.1	
Liberal Federation	Edward Vardon	646	1.9	
Women's Non-Party	Leonora Polkinghorne	1,255	3.7	
Total formal votes		34,193	93.4	
Informal votes		2,423	6.6	
Turnout		36,616	69.5	
Party total votes
Labor		17,845	52.2	
Liberal Federation		15,093	44.1	
Women's Non-Party	Leonora Polkinghorne	1,255	3.7	

=== Victoria ===
1930 South Australian state election: Victoria
Party	Candidate	Votes	%	±%
Liberal Federation	Peter Reidy (elected)	4,217	41.2	
Liberal Federation	Vernon Petherick	1,066	10.4	
Labor	Eric Shepherd (elected)	4,614	45.1	
Labor	Francis Young	329	3.2	
Total formal votes		10,226	94.3	
Informal votes		612	5.7	
Turnout		10,838	94.5	
Party total votes
Liberal Federation		5,283	51.7	
Labor		4,913	48.3	

=== Wallaroo ===
1930 South Australian state election: Wallaroo
Party	Candidate	Votes	%	±%
Labor	John Pedler (elected)	2,263	50.1	
Labor	Robert Richards (elected)	423	9.4	
Independent	Frank Filmer	1,039	23.0	
Independent	Richard Kitto	551	12.2	
Independent	William Price	238	5.3	
Total formal votes		4,514	96.1	
Informal votes		183	3.9	
Turnout		4,697	83.7	
Party total votes
Labor		2,686	59.5	
Independent	Frank Filmer	1,039	23.0	
Independent	Richard Kitto	551	12.2	
Independent	William Price	238	5.3	

=== West Torrens ===
1930 South Australian state election: West Torrens
Party	Candidate	Votes	%	±%
Labor	Alfred Blackwell (elected)	14,311	69.7	
Labor	John McInnes (elected)	1,092	5.3	
Independent Labor	Clive Caldicott	3,638	17.7	
Independent Labor	Louis Crosby	1,142	5.6	
Communist	Thomas McGillick	360	1.8	
Total formal votes		20,543	94.8	
Informal votes		1,131	5.2	
Turnout		21,674	65.3	
Party total votes
Labor		15,403	75.0	
Independent Labor		4,780	23.3	
Communist		360	1.8	

=== Wooroora ===
1930 South Australian state election: Wooroora
Party	Candidate	Votes	%	±%
Country	Archie Cameron (elected)	3,970	48.8	
Country	Brian Richardson	106	1.3	
Country	Samuel Dennison (elected)	95	1.2	
Liberal Federation	Richard Butler (elected)	3,714	45.6	
Liberal Federation	Friedrich Heinrich	143	1.8	
Liberal Federation	William Marshman	114	1.4	
Total formal votes		8,142	95.0	
Informal votes		429	5.0	
Turnout		8,571	81.2	
Party total votes
Country		4,171	51.2	
Liberal Federation		3,971	48.8	

=== Yorke Peninsula ===
1930 South Australian state election: Yorke Peninsula
Party	Candidate	Votes	%	±%
Liberal Federation	Edward Giles (elected)	1,987	39.2	
Liberal Federation	Baden Pattinson (elected)	1,360	26.8	
Country	Joseph Honner	1,509	29.8	
Country	Stepney Pontifex	212	4.2	
Total formal votes		5,068	95.1	
Informal votes		262	4.9	
Turnout		5,330	73.5	
Party total votes
Liberal Federation		3,347	66.0	
Country		1,721	34.0	

== See also ==
- Candidates of the 1930 South Australian state election
- Members of the South Australian House of Assembly, 1930–1933
