= Attorney General Homburg =

Attorney General Homburg may refer to:

- Hermann Homburg (1874–1964), Attorney-General of South Australia
- Robert Homburg (1848–1912), Attorney-General of South Australia
