= Electoral results for the district of Heysen =

South Australian district election results

This is a list of electoral results for the Electoral district of Heysen in South Australian state elections.

== Members for Heysen ==
First incarnation (1970–1977)
| Member | Party | Term |
|---|---|---|
| William McAnaney | Liberal and Country | 1970–1974 |
| William McAnaney | Liberal | 1974–1975 |
| David Wotton | Liberal | 1975–1977 |
Second incarnation (1985–present)
| Member | Party | Term |
| David Wotton | Liberal | 1985–2002 |
| Isobel Redmond | Liberal | 2002–2018 |
| Josh Teague | Liberal | 2018–present |

== Election results ==
=== Elections in the 2020s ===
==== 2026 ====
2026 South Australian state election: Heysen
| Party | Candidate | Votes | % | ±% |
|---|---|---|---|---|
| Liberal | Josh Teague | 8,697 | 32.6 | −9.4 |
| Labor | Marisa Bell | 6,472 | 24.2 | −1.3 |
| Greens | Genevieve Dawson-Scott | 5,838 | 21.9 | +2.3 |
| One Nation | Tom Kovac | 4,313 | 16.2 | +11.5 |
| Animal Justice | Gregory Davis | 477 | 1.8 | +1.8 |
| Independent | Andrew Granger | 454 | 1.7 | +1.7 |
| Family First | Chris Baker | 285 | 1.1 | −2.8 |
| Australian Family | Craig Wilson | 90 | 0.3 | +0.3 |
| Fair Go | Tonya Scott | 78 | 0.3 | +0.3 |
| Total formal votes | | 26,704 | 96.1 | −1.9 |
| Informal votes | | 1,095 | 3.9 | +1.9 |
| Turnout | | 27,799 | 92.5 | −1.0 |
Two-party-preferred result
| Liberal | Josh Teague | 13,531 | 50.6 | −1.3 |
| Labor | Marisa Bell | 13,184 | 49.4 | +1.3 |
| Liberal hold | | Swing | −1.3 | |

==== 2022 ====
2022 South Australian state election: Heysen
| Party | Candidate | Votes | % | ±% |
|---|---|---|---|---|
| Liberal | Josh Teague | 10,336 | 43.3 | +3.0 |
| Labor | Rowan Voogt | 6,410 | 26.9 | +8.0 |
| Greens | Lynton Vonow | 4,937 | 20.7 | +8.7 |
| One Nation | Alexander Allwood | 1,159 | 4.9 | +4.9 |
| Family First | Belinda Nikitins | 1,008 | 4.2 | +4.2 |
| Total formal votes | | 23,850 | 98.0 | |
| Informal votes | | 494 | 2.0 | |
| Turnout | | 24,344 | 93.5 | |
Two-party-preferred result
| Liberal | Josh Teague | 12,377 | 51.9 | −5.7 |
| Labor | Rowan Voogt | 11,473 | 48.1 | +5.7 |
| Liberal hold | | Swing | −5.7 | |

Distribution of preferences: Heysen
| Party | Candidate | Votes | Round 1 | | Round 2 | | Round 3 | |
| Party | Candidate | Votes | Dist. | Total | Dist. | Total | Dist. | Total |
|---|---|---|---|---|---|---|---|---|
| Quota (50% + 1) | | 11,926 | | | | | | |
| Liberal | Josh Teague | 10,336 | +249 | 10,585 | +663 | 11,248 | +1,129 | 12,377 |
| Labor | Rowan Voogt | 6,410 | +121 | 6,531 | +535 | 7,066 | +4,407 | 11,473 |
| Greens | Lynton Vonow | 4,937 | +185 | 5,122 | +414 | 5,536 | Excluded | |
| One Nation | Alexander Allwood | 1,159 | +453 | 1,612 | Excluded | | | |
| Family First | Belinda Nikitins | 1,008 | Excluded | | | | | |

=== Elections in the 2010s ===
==== 2018 ====
2018 South Australian state election: Heysen
| Party | Candidate | Votes | % | ±% |
|---|---|---|---|---|
| Liberal | Josh Teague | 9,227 | 40.7 | −13.4 |
| SA Best | John Illingworth | 5,514 | 24.3 | +24.3 |
| Labor | Tony Webb | 4,123 | 18.2 | −2.1 |
| Greens | Lynton Vonow | 2,557 | 11.3 | −8.3 |
| Conservatives | Lynette Stevenson | 785 | 3.5 | +3.0 |
| Dignity | Andrew Ey | 467 | 2.1 | −2.7 |
| Total formal votes | | 22,673 | 96.7 | −0.6 |
| Informal votes | | 767 | 3.3 | +0.6 |
| Turnout | | 23,440 | 93.7 | +2.0 |
Two-party-preferred result
| Liberal | Josh Teague | 13,259 | 58.5 | −3.8 |
| Labor | Tony Webb | 9,414 | 41.5 | +3.8 |
Two-candidate-preferred result
| Liberal | Josh Teague | 11,749 | 51.8 | −10.4 |
| SA Best | John Illingworth | 10,924 | 48.2 | +48.2 |
| Liberal hold | | | | |

2014 South Australian state election: Heysen
| Party | Candidate | Votes | % | ±% |
|---|---|---|---|---|
| Liberal | Isobel Redmond | 12,768 | 55.5 | −2.4 |
| Greens | Lynton Vonow | 4,527 | 19.7 | +2.7 |
| Labor | Paul Yiallouros | 4,527 | 19.7 | −0.1 |
| Dignity for Disability | Amy Park | 1,192 | 5.2 | +5.2 |
| Total formal votes | | 23,014 | 97.3 | −0.1 |
| Informal votes | | 630 | 2.7 | +0.1 |
| Turnout | | 23,644 | 93.1 | −0.7 |
Two-party-preferred result
| Liberal | Isobel Redmond | 14,619 | 63.5 | −3.0 |
| Labor | Paul Yiallouros | 8,395 | 36.5 | +3.0 |
Two-candidate-preferred result
| Liberal | Isobel Redmond | 14,040 | 61.0 | −5.5 |
| Greens | Lynton Vonow | 8,974 | 39.0 | +39.0 |
| Liberal hold | | Swing | N/A | |

2010 South Australian state election: Heysen
| Party | Candidate | Votes | % | ±% |
|---|---|---|---|---|
| Liberal | Isobel Redmond | 12,519 | 58.0 | +13.7 |
| Labor | Stephanie Gheller | 4,278 | 19.8 | −6.9 |
| Greens | Lynton Vonow | 3,662 | 17.0 | +0.3 |
| Family First | John Day | 728 | 3.4 | −3.1 |
| Democrats | Andrew Castrique | 416 | 1.9 | −3.1 |
| Total formal votes | | 21,603 | 97.2 | |
| Informal votes | | 568 | 2.8 | |
| Turnout | | 22,171 | 93.8 | |
Two-party-preferred result
| Liberal | Isobel Redmond | 14,368 | 66.5 | +11.6 |
| Labor | Stephanie Gheller | 7,235 | 33.5 | −11.6 |
| Liberal hold | | Swing | +11.6 | |

=== Elections in the 2000s ===
2006 South Australian state election: Heysen
| Party | Candidate | Votes | % | ±% |
|---|---|---|---|---|
| Liberal | Isobel Redmond | 8,683 | 43.9 | −2.1 |
| Labor | Andrew Christie | 5,553 | 28.1 | +9.8 |
| Greens | John Gitsham | 3,508 | 17.7 | +8.9 |
| Democrats | Rosemary Drabsch | 1,044 | 5.3 | −11.0 |
| Family First | Peter Robins | 996 | 5.0 | +1.5 |
| Total formal votes | | 19,784 | 97.3 | −0.1 |
| Informal votes | | 539 | 2.7 | +0.1 |
| Turnout | | 20,323 | 92.8 | −1.3 |
Two-party-preferred result
| Liberal | Isobel Redmond | 10,491 | 53.0 | −1.0 |
| Labor | Andrew Christie | 9,293 | 47.0 | +47.0 |
| Liberal hold | | Swing | N/A | |

2002 South Australian state election: Heysen
| Party | Candidate | Votes | % | ±% |
|---|---|---|---|---|
| Liberal | Isobel Redmond | 9,222 | 46.0 | −3.8 |
| Labor | Jeremy Makin | 3,662 | 18.3 | −2.3 |
| Democrats | Ted Dexter | 3,266 | 16.3 | −12.6 |
| Greens | Dave Clark | 1,760 | 8.8 | +8.8 |
| Independent | John Norris | 736 | 3.7 | +3.7 |
| Family First | Sally McPherson | 703 | 3.5 | +3.5 |
| SA First | Steve Hall | 375 | 1.9 | +1.9 |
| One Nation | Lance Iles | 276 | 1.4 | +1.4 |
| Independent | Howie Coombe | 53 | 0.3 | +0.3 |
| Total formal votes | | 20,053 | 97.4 | |
| Informal votes | | 536 | 2.6 | |
| Turnout | | 20,589 | 94.1 | |
Two-party-preferred result
| Liberal | Isobel Redmond | | 59.6 | −2.5 |
| Labor | Jeremy Makin | | 40.4 | +2.5 |
Two-candidate-preferred result
| Liberal | Isobel Redmond | 10,825 | 54.0 | +2.1 |
| Democrats | Ted Dexter | 9,228 | 46.0 | −2.1 |
| Liberal hold | | Swing | +2.1 | |

=== Elections in the 1990s ===
1997 South Australian state election: Heysen
| Party | Candidate | Votes | % | ±% |
|---|---|---|---|---|
| Liberal | David Wotton | 9,723 | 50.4 | −15.3 |
| Democrats | Susan Scrymgour | 5,643 | 29.2 | +17.9 |
| Labor | Tom Kenyon | 3,938 | 20.4 | +4.9 |
| Total formal votes | | 19,304 | 96.8 | −1.3 |
| Informal votes | | 632 | 3.2 | +1.3 |
| Turnout | | 19,936 | 92.1 | |
Two-party-preferred result
| Liberal | David Wotton | 11,997 | 62.1 | −12.3 |
| Labor | Tom Kenyon | 7,307 | 37.9 | +12.3 |
Two-candidate-preferred result
| Liberal | David Wotton | 10,051 | 52.1 | −22.4 |
| Democrats | Susan Scrymgour | 9,253 | 47.9 | +47.9 |
| Liberal hold | | Swing | N/A | |

1993 South Australian state election: Heysen
| Party | Candidate | Votes | % | ±% |
|---|---|---|---|---|
| Liberal | David Wotton | 12,753 | 65.6 | +10.8 |
| Labor | David Cornish | 3,003 | 15.5 | −10.8 |
| Democrats | John Tons | 2,199 | 11.3 | −6.7 |
| Greens | Mnemosyne Giles | 1,092 | 5.6 | +5.6 |
| Natural Law | Pamela Chipperfield | 384 | 2.0 | +2.0 |
| Total formal votes | | 19,431 | 98.2 | −0.7 |
| Informal votes | | 364 | 1.8 | +0.7 |
| Turnout | | 19,795 | 93.7 | |
Two-party-preferred result
| Liberal | David Wotton | 14,475 | 74.5 | +10.5 |
| Labor | David Cornish | 4,956 | 25.5 | −10.5 |
| Liberal hold | | Swing | +10.5 | |

=== Elections in the 1980s ===
1989 South Australian state election: Heysen
| Party | Candidate | Votes | % | ±% |
|---|---|---|---|---|
| Liberal | David Wotton | 11,162 | 57.0 | +2.6 |
| Labor | Jillian Bromley | 5,131 | 26.2 | −11.3 |
| Democrats | Merilyn Pedrick | 3,299 | 16.8 | +10.5 |
| Total formal votes | | 19,592 | 98.1 | +0.7 |
| Informal votes | | 369 | 1.9 | −0.7 |
| Turnout | | 19,961 | 94.3 | +1.2 |
Two-party-preferred result
| Liberal | David Wotton | 12,749 | 65.1 | +6.3 |
| Labor | Jillian Bromley | 6,843 | 34.9 | −6.3 |
| Liberal hold | | Swing | +6.3 | |

1985 South Australian state election: Heysen
| Party | Candidate | Votes | % | ±% |
|---|---|---|---|---|
| Liberal | David Wotton | 9,418 | 54.4 | −2.6 |
| Labor | Elizabeth Harvey | 6,497 | 37.5 | +4.5 |
| Democrats | Merilyn Pedrick | 1,095 | 6.3 | −3.7 |
| National | Douglas Lindley | 304 | 1.8 | +1.8 |
| Total formal votes | | 17,314 | 97.4 | |
| Informal votes | | 460 | 2.6 | |
| Turnout | | 17,774 | 93.1 | |
Two-party-preferred result
| Liberal | David Wotton | 10,175 | 58.8 | −3.2 |
| Labor | Elizabeth Harvey | 7,139 | 41.2 | +3.2 |
| Liberal hold | | Swing | −3.2 | |

=== Elections in the 1970s ===
1975 South Australian state election: Heysen
| Party | Candidate | Votes | % | ±% |
|---|---|---|---|---|
| Liberal | David Wotton | 5,588 | 47.5 | −25.5 |
| Liberal Movement | Terence McAnaney | 3,124 | 26.6 | +26.6 |
| Labor | Myles McCallum | 2,690 | 22.9 | −4.1 |
| Australia | Howard Houck | 357 | 3.0 | +3.0 |
| Total formal votes | | 11,759 | 97.2 | +3.7 |
| Informal votes | | 333 | 2.8 | −3.7 |
| Turnout | | 12,092 | 93.5 | −0.8 |
Two-candidate-preferred result
| Liberal | David Wotton | 7,626 | 64.8 | −8.2 |
| Liberal Movement | Terence McAnaney | 4,133 | 35.2 | +35.2 |
| Liberal hold | | Swing | N/A | |

1973 South Australian state election: Heysen
| Party | Candidate | Votes | % | ±% |
|---|---|---|---|---|
| Liberal and Country | William McAnaney | 7,327 | 73.0 | +5.4 |
| Labor | Howard Houck | 2,708 | 27.0 | −5.4 |
| Total formal votes | | 10,035 | 93.5 | −4.2 |
| Informal votes | | 694 | 6.5 | +4.2 |
| Turnout | | 10,729 | 94.3 | −1.2 |
| Liberal and Country hold | | Swing | +5.4 | |

1970 South Australian state election: Heysen
| Party | Candidate | Votes | % | ±% |
|---|---|---|---|---|
| Liberal and Country | William McAnaney | 6,589 | 67.6 | |
| Labor | Charles Greeneklee | 3,165 | 32.4 | |
| Total formal votes | | 9,754 | 97.7 | |
| Informal votes | | 226 | 2.3 | |
| Turnout | | 9,980 | 95.5 | |
| Liberal and Country hold | | Swing | | |
