= William Frederick Stock =

Australian politician (1847–1913)

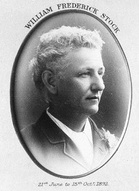
- W.F. Stock in 1892

Attorney-General of South Australia
- In office 21 June 1892 – 15 October 1892
- Premier: Frederick Holder
- Preceded by: Robert Homburg
- Succeeded by: Robert Homburg

Member of the South Australian House of Assembly for Electoral district of Sturt
- In office 2 April 1887 – 14 April 1893 Serving with John Jenkins

Personal details
- Born: 28 July 1847 Clifton St Andrew, Gloucestershire, England
- Died: 23 November 1913 (aged 66) North Adelaide, South Australia
- Spouses: Clara Graham (m. 1870; died 1888) Mary Haigh (née Spicer) (m. 1909)
- Children: 3 daughters

William Frederick Stock, M.P., (28 July 1847 – 23 November 1913) was a South Australian lawyer and politician, briefly Attorney-General of South Australia in 1892.

== History ==
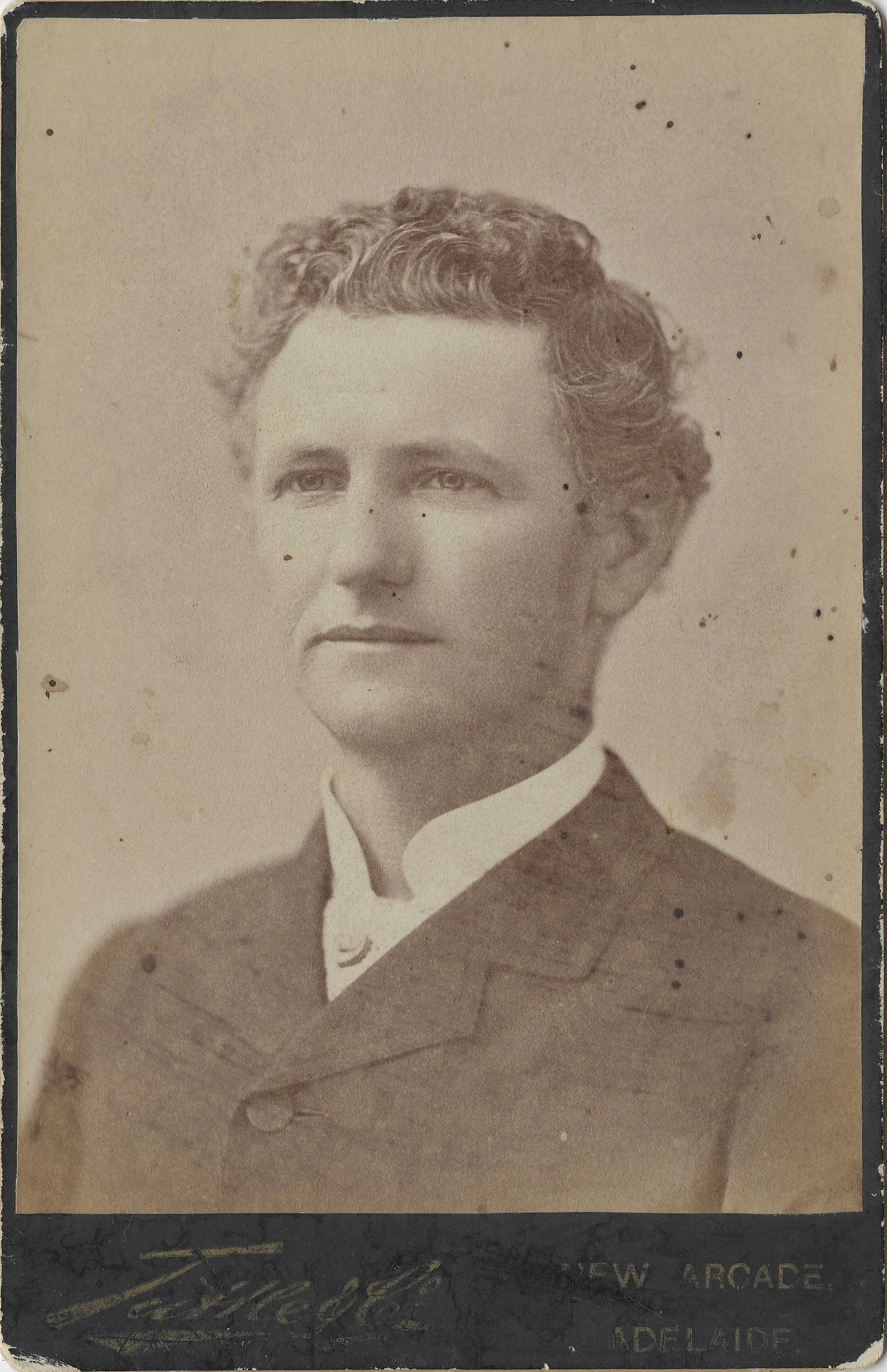
A Cabinet Card portrait of William Frederick Stock, photographed by Tuttle & Co. at the New Arcade, Adelaide, circa 1885–1889.

Stock was born in Clifton St Andrew, Gloucestershire, England, a son of Robert Stock and Caroline Stock, née Holland, and christened there on 3 September 1847. Stock was one of five children who with their widowed mother sailed to South Australia aboard Statesman, arriving in February 1850. He was educated at Adelaide Educational Institution and St Peter's College, Adelaide, and in England. He was admitted to the South Australian Bar in June 1871, and was three times Mayor of Glenelg in the late 1870s. He was President of the Railway Employees' Association. In 1886 he entered into a limited form of partnership with his nephew Sydney Talbot Smith as Stock & Talbot Smith.

In 1887 he was elected to the seat of Sturt in the South Australian House of Assembly. In June 1892, on the accession to power of the Holder Ministry, Stock was appointed Attorney-General.

On 23 November 1913, Stock died at a private hospital in North Adelaide after a long illness.

== Family ==
William Frederick Stock (c. August 1847 – 23 November 1913) married Clara Graham (1 June 1846 – 1 February 1888) on 16 April 1870; their children were:

- Kathleen Clara Stock (26 January 1871 – 1944), married Francis James Roche on 14 November 1891 in Shanghai, and died in Auckland, New Zealand
- Stella Denison Stock (12 November 1872 – 29 November 1950), married D'Arcy Talbot Bruce on 22 February 1894 in Surbiton, England (div.1902); married George Henry Priest Shanks in 1902 in Kensington, England; and died in Torquay, England
- Vivien Grace Stock (7 March 1875 – 13 September 1966), married William Steele (1872 - 1952) on 11 Sep 1897, and died in Goodwood, SA

William Frederick Stock was twice related by marriage to Edwin Thomas Smith, who married his sister, Florence Stock (c. 1837 – 12 February 1862), on 25 June 1857; and then through Smith's second marriage to Elizabeth Spicer (31 May 1846 – 6 June 1911), when Stock married Elizabeth's sister Mary Haigh (née Spicer, ~1853 – 30 August 1917) on 12 May 1909. Elizabeth and Mary were both daughters of early colonist Edward Spicer.

=== Tregenna ===
William Frederick Stock's mansion "Tregenna" on North East Road, Collinswood, set on 4.5 acres (1.8 ha) and attributed to architect Edward Davies, was built in 1899-1900. Following Stock's death in 1913, his widow Mary Stock continued to reside there. During World War I she was a prominent worker for the Cheer-Up Society, and used the grounds of "Tregenna" to hold events such as gymkhanas and fetes for the Red Cross, as well as for growing vegetables and fruit to supply Cheer-up Hut events for thousands of soldiers.

"Tregenna" was put up for sale in June 1917, but after Mary Stock's death in August 1917, her daughter from her previous marriage, Alice Hill (née Haigh, 1875 – 28 January 1929) continued to live there with her own family until her own death. Alice's daughter May Hill (1 May 1909 – ) continued living on the property, holding gymkhanas for the Adelaide Horse Riding Club and other charitable events into the early 1950s.

The property was sold to the Australian Broadcasting Commission in 1957 and new buildings in the grounds were constructed for use as studios and broadcasting facilities for the ABS-2 television service for SA, which commenced in 1960. By 1969 other existing ABC facilities in Hindmarsh Square and Norwood were considered inadequate, and the decision was made to consolidate all services at Collinswood. The "Tregenna" mansion was demolished in 1970, and replaced by an 8-storey brutalist building, opened in 1974. The "Tregenna" name has been commemorated by the naming of the "Tregenna café" within the complex.

Political offices
Preceded by Robert Homburg	Attorney-General of South Australia; 1892	Succeeded by Robert Homburg
Parliament of South Australia
Preceded by Samuel Dening Glyde	Member for Sturt; 1887–1893; Served alongside: John Jenkins	Succeeded by Thomas Price
