= ABS (TV station) =

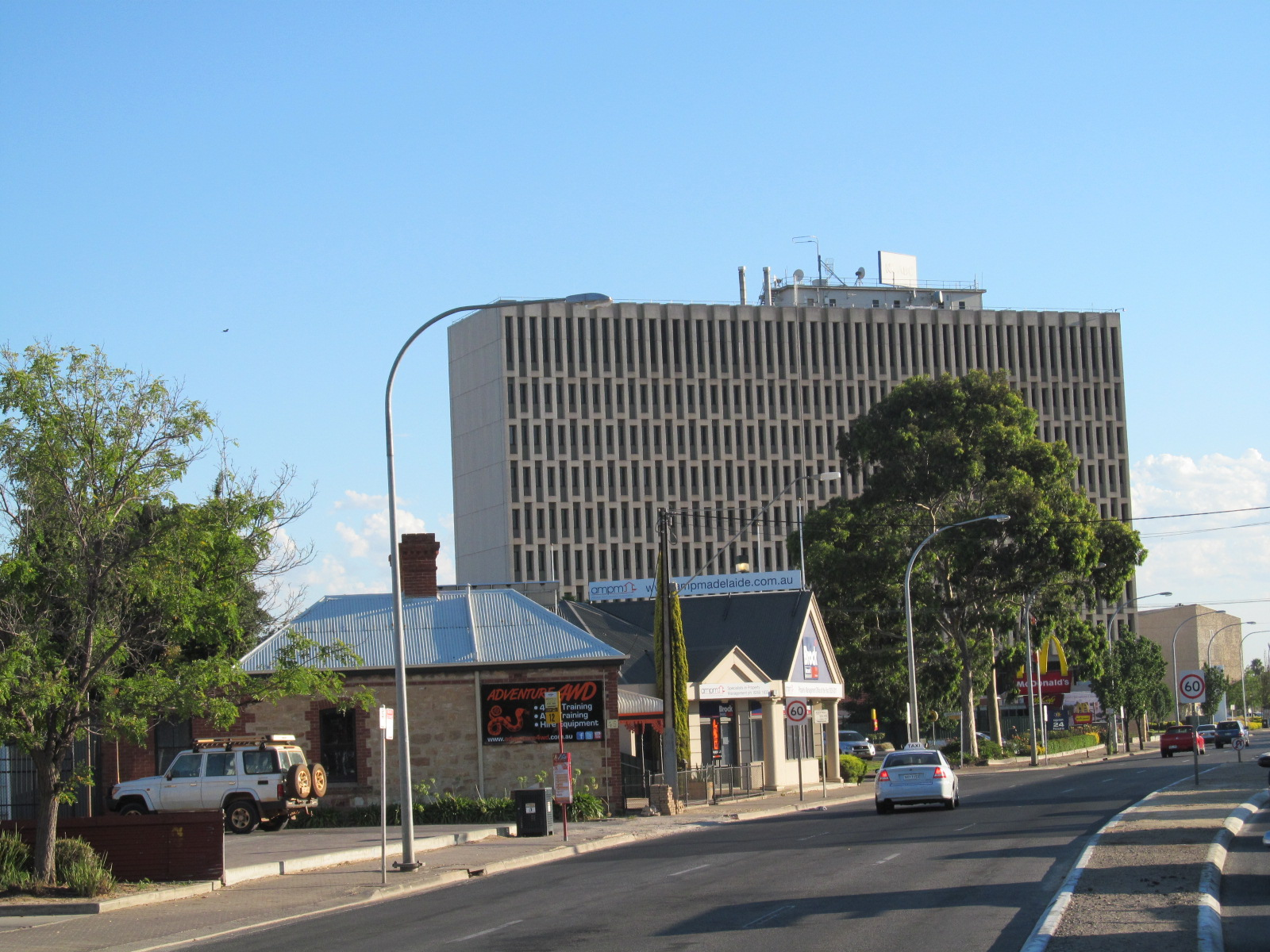
- Adelaide, South Australia; Australia
- Channels: Digital: 12 (VHF); Virtual: 2

Programming
- Language: English
- Affiliations: ABC Television

Ownership
- Owner: Australian Broadcasting Corporation

History
- First air date: 11 March 1960
- Former channel number: Analog: 2 (VHF) (1960–2013)
- Call sign meaning: ABC/South Australia

Technical information
- Licensing authority: Australian Communications & Media Authority
- ERP: 50 kW
- HAAT: 517 m
- Transmitter coordinates: 34°58′44″S 138°42′31″E

ABC Television in South Australia comprises national and local programming on the ABC television network in South Australia, headquartered in Adelaide. ABS or ABS-2 was the historic call sign and name of the Australian Broadcasting Corporation's television station in Adelaide, with the "S" standing for South Australia.

== History ==
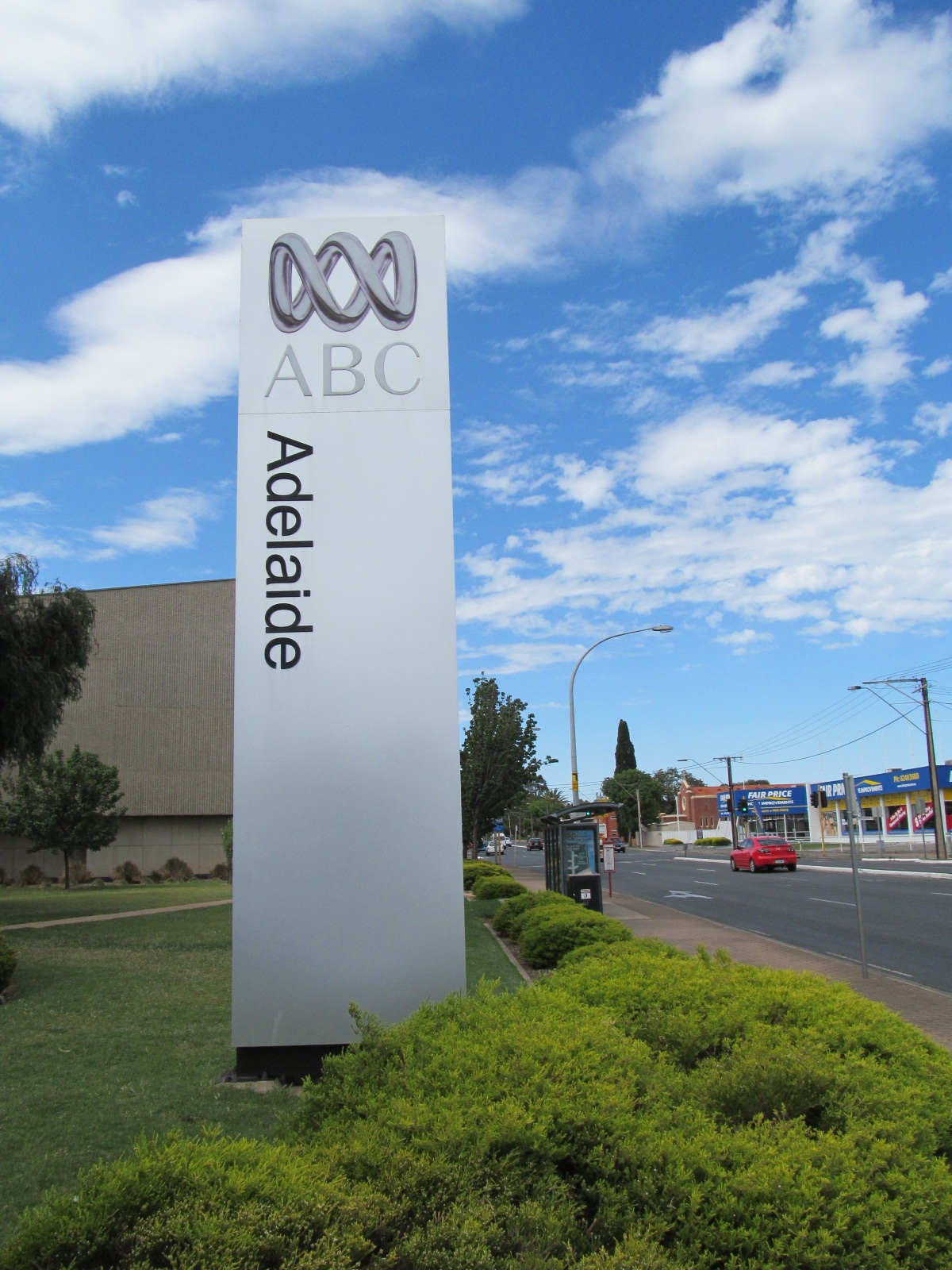
ABC Collinswood building sign

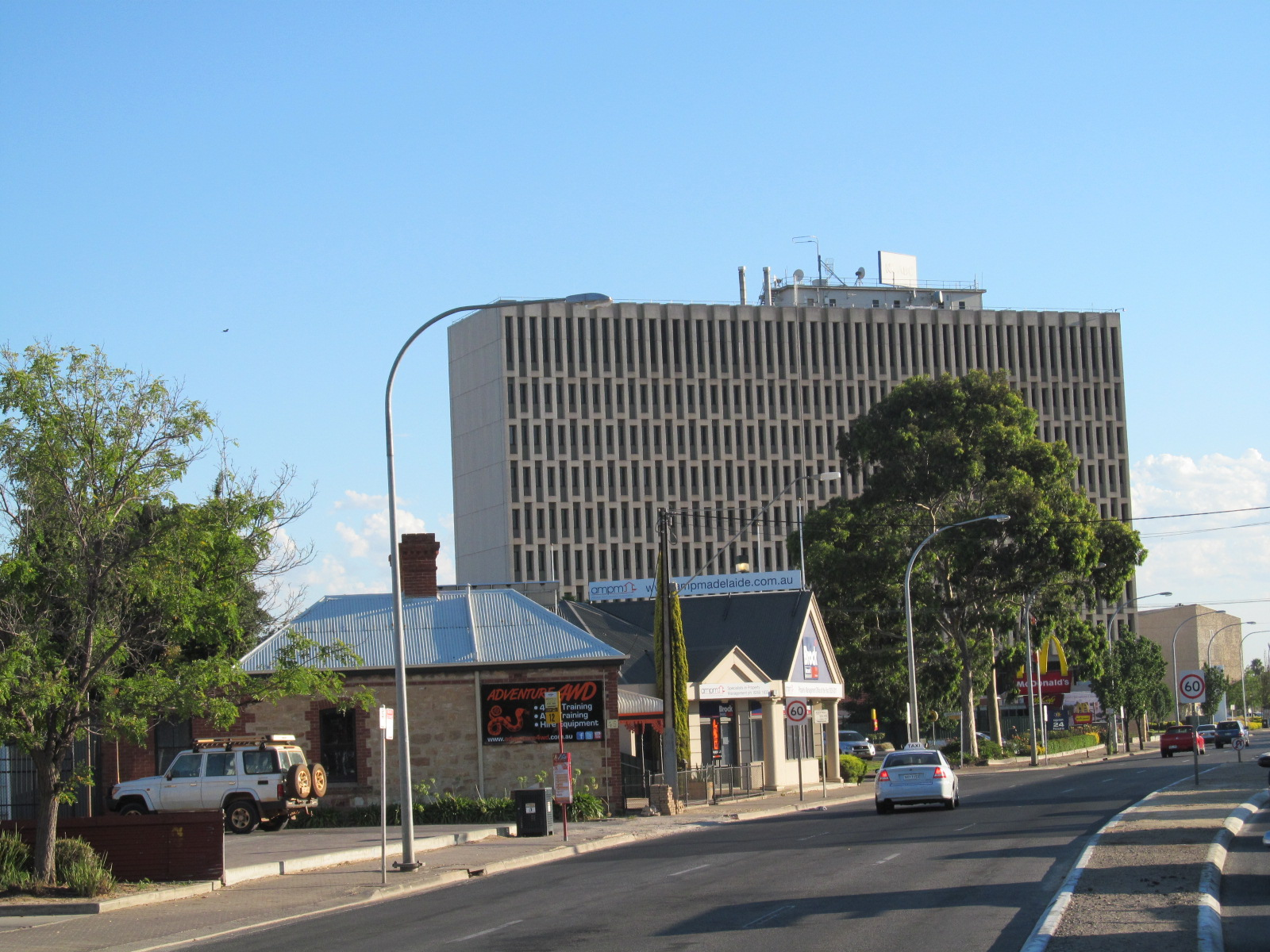
ABC Collinswood building

ABS began broadcasting on 11 March 1960 from studios at the historic Tregenna mansion in the suburb of Collinswood. The station's transmitter is located at Mount Lofty and is augmented by a series of relay transmitters throughout the state.

ABS commenced digital television transmission in January 2001, broadcasting on VHF Channel 12 while maintaining analogue transmission on VHF Channel 2. The analogue signal for ABS was shut off at 9 am on Tuesday, 2 April 2013, making Adelaide the first state capital to make the permanent switch, with Canberra being the first city to do so in 2012.

In November 2014, current managing director Mark Scott announced at a meeting held at ABC's Ultimo headquarters in Sydney that a major restructuring would occur due to a cut of over A$254 million from the ABC budget. In an email to staff, Scott said:

[We will] close our Adelaide television production studio and wind down remaining television production in smaller states. The economics of the television sector make it difficult to maintain small-scale operations. It is more economically efficient to base production (outside news and current affairs) in Sydney and Melbourne. TV aims to work with the independent sector on programming that better reflects local diversity. To demonstrate accountability, the ABC will deliver detailed annual reports on local production, including dollars invested and programs made.

In February 2025, it was announced that the Collinswood building was reaching the end of its suitability. Following a feasibility study, the ABC announced plans to move operations from Collinswood to a new arts precinct on the site of the old Adelaide Central bus station in Franklin Street, Adelaide by 2031.

=== Programs produced in the Adelaide studios ===
The following programs were produced in the Adelaide studios of ABC Television:

- Couch Potato
- Talking Heads
- Behind the News
- Poh's Kitchen
- News on 3

== ABC Television in South Australia today ==
As of 2021, there are a large number of transmitters broadcasting several ABC channels.

=== Local programming ===
Only the local edition of ABC News continues to be broadcast from Adelaide. Jessica Harmsen presents ABC News South Australia from Monday to Thursday, and Richard Davies or Candice Prosser from Friday to Sunday. The weeknight bulletins also incorporate a national finance segment presented by David Chau in Sydney. Weekend bulletins feature local sport bulletins presented by Neil Cross.

== Relay stations ==
The following stations relayed ABS throughout South Australia:

Call	Region served	City	Channels (Analog/ digital)	First air date	3rd letter's meaning	ERP (Analog/ digital)	HAAT (Analog/ digital)^{1}	Transmitter coordinates	Transmitter location
ABCS	Ceduna	Ceduna	9 (VHF)^{2} 39 (UHF)	16 July 1973	Ceduna	1.6 kW	92 m	32°8′20″S 133°47′22″E	Kongwirra Hill
ABGS	South East South Australia	Mount Gambier	1 (VHF)^{3} 39 (UHF)	3 December 1965	Mount Gambier	210 kW; 225 kW	276 m 379 m	37°36′8″S 140°28′58″E	Mount Burr
ABLCS	Leigh Creek	Leigh Creek	9 (VHF); 8 (VHF)	28 April 1977	Leigh Creek	0.032 kW; 0.01 kW	3 m 3 m	30°35′59″S 138°24′13″E	Leigh Creek
ABNS	Spencer Gulf North	Port Pirie	1 (VHF)^{3} 38 (UHF)	10 April 1965	Spencer Gulf North	200 kW; 240 kW	576 m 627 m	33°6′14″S 138°9′51″E	The Bluff
ABRS	Riverland	Renmark/Loxton	3 (VHF)^{3} 39 (UHF)	20 January 1971	Riverland	240 kW; 240 kW	166 m 180 m	34°27′52″S 140°32′1″E	Loxton
ABWS	Woomera	Woomera	7 (VHF); NA	30 November 1973	Woomera	0.02 kW	48 m	31°11′31″S 136°48′53″E	Woomera

Notes:

- 1. HAAT estimated from http://www.itu.int/SRTM3/ using EHAAT.
- 2. ABCS was on VHF channel 7 from its 1973 sign-on until sometime in the 1980s.
- 3. Analogue transmissions ceased as of 15 December 2010 as part of the national shutdown of analogue television.
