= Isobel Redmond =

Australian politician (born 1953)

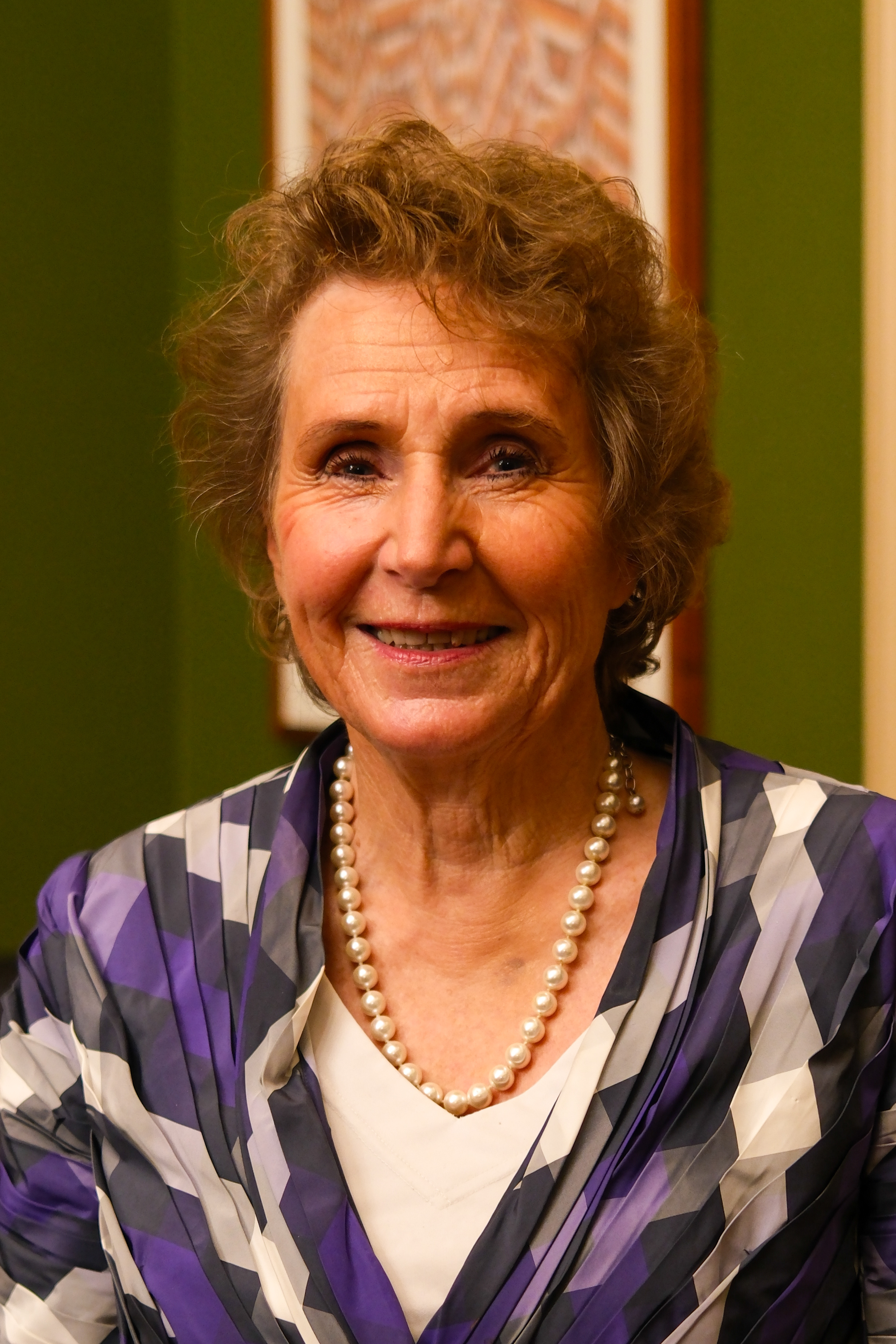
- Redmond in 2026

Leader of the Opposition in South Australia
- In office 8 July 2009 – 31 January 2013
- Premier: Mike Rann; Jay Weatherill
- Deputy: Steven Griffiths; Martin Hamilton-Smith; Mitch Williams; Steven Marshall
- Preceded by: Martin Hamilton-Smith
- Succeeded by: Steven Marshall

Leader of the South Australian Liberal Party
- In office 8 July 2009 – 31 January 2013
- Deputy: Steven Griffiths; Martin Hamilton-Smith; Mitch Williams; Steven Marshall
- Preceded by: Martin Hamilton-Smith
- Succeeded by: Steven Marshall

Deputy Leader of the South Australian Liberal Party
- In office 4 July 2009 – 8 July 2009
- Leader: Martin Hamilton-Smith
- Preceded by: Vickie Chapman
- Succeeded by: Steven Griffiths

Member of the South Australian Parliament for Heysen
- In office 9 February 2002 – 17 March 2018
- Preceded by: David Wotton
- Succeeded by: Josh Teague

Personal details
- Born: Isobel Mary Redmond; 8 April 1953 (age 73) Engadine, New South Wales, Australia
- Party: Liberal
- Spouse: James Redmond (m. 1974)
- Children: 3
- Education: Heathcote High School
- Profession: Lawyer
- Isobel Redmond's voice Redmond speaking about democracy Recorded 21 May 2026

Isobel Mary Redmond (born 8 April 1953) is an Australian former politician and solicitor who served as leader of the Opposition in South Australia and the leader of the South Australian Liberal Party from 2009 and 2013. She represented Heysen in the South Australian House of Assembly from 2002 to 2018 and was the first woman to lead a major political party in the state.

Redmond was born in Engadine, New South Wales and went to Heathcote High School. She pursued her education in law through night classes while employed as a clerk at the Crown Solicitor's Office of New South Wales. In 1978, she relocated to the Adelaide Hills to practice law. She sat on the District Council of Stirling from 1982 to 1987.

Redmond became a member of parliament after the 2002 state election. During her tenure in parliament, she occupied several shadow portfolios including justice and Shadow Attorney-General. She became the Liberal Party leader in July 2009, taking over from Martin Hamilton-Smith. She led the party in the 2010 state election where the Liberals lost seats to form the government. Redmond successfully defended herself against a leadership challenge by Hamilton-Smith in 2012 before resigning as the leader in January 2013. She was succeeded by Steven Marshall.

Redmond retained Heysen in the 2014 election and left the parliament after the 2018 election. On her retirement from politics, she became a patron of the Justice Reform Initiative of South Australia and was part of a Liberal Party task force working towards getting more women into politics. She ran a campaign in 2023 opposing the plan to move Stirling Community Hospital to Mount Barker.

== Early life and education ==
Isobel Mary Redmond was born on 8 April 1953 in Engadine and grew up in Heathcote near Wollongong. She attended Heathcote High School, completing her secondary education in 1971. At the age of 18 or 19, she travelled across Australia on a three-week bus trip and visited the Adelaide Hills for the first time, later deciding she wanted to live there.

Redmond was the first member of her family to attend university and paid for her own studies. While studying law through night classes with the New South Wales Barristers Admission Board, she worked as a clerk in the Crown Solicitor's Office. In her youth, she owned a terrace house in Newtown, which was later purchased by Frank Sartor. In her twenties, Redmond briefly joined the Australian Labor Party but left after attending one meeting.

In 1978, Redmond relocated to the Adelaide Hills, where she set up a legal practice. Throughout the 1980s, she opposed plans for the redevelopment of the central street of Aldgate, and served on the District Council of Stirling between 1982 and 1987.

Redmond set up her own practice in Stirling in the early 1990s following her winning of a lottery ticket worth A$25,000 that was a gift from her parents for Christmas. Throughout her career as an attorney, she was involved in representing the rights of the Mirning people by working in their case for native title. Redmond presided as the president of the Rotary Club of Stirling from 1999 to 2000, and she practiced law for six years before joining politics.

== Early political career ==
=== Kerin shadow ministry (2002–2006) ===
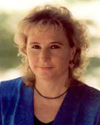
Undated portrait of Redmond taken during an earlier stage of her political career

Redmond was elected as a Liberal Party candidate for the South Australian House of Assembly seat of Heysen at the state election held on 9 February 2002, replacing retiring David Wotton. She won the seat on an 8,042 vote first-preference basis, representing a 3.8 percent swing against the Liberals. On preference votes, Redmond polled 8,699 votes, 55.7 per cent of the two-party preferred vote.

On 1 April 2004, the Leader of the Opposition, Rob Kerin, named Redmond as the Shadow Minister for Housing and Shadow Minister for Families and Communities. She assumed responsibility for the portfolios of ageing and disability on 18 April. On 12 July, Redmond advocated an independent investigation of something at the Strathmont Centre by a retired judge or Queen's Counsel because of concerns over supervision and professional practices in disabilities. Redmond endorsed the proposed sale of Beechwood Garden in Stirling but wanted legislation passed protecting its heritage significance. In September, in response to an incident involving Vini Ciccarello, Redmond stated that the allegation of misconduct in the parliament would need to be taken seriously irrespective of gender.

Redmond made a call in February 2005 to improve employment screening in the disability sector after a staff who was fired because of misconduct joined another facility. In April, she made a call for a parliamentary investigation on allegations of assault against Peter Lewis and that the MP involved be named if the allegations proved to be true. The Heritage (Beechwood Garden) Amendment Bill 2005 was introduced by her in that year. Redmond relinquished the portfolios of housing and families and communities on 6 March 2006 and took up the Shadow Minister for Justice and Shadow Attorney-General portfolio.

=== Evans and Hamilton-Smith shadow ministries (2006–2009) ===
After the Liberals lost the 2006 state election, Kerin stepped down as the party leader. On 24 March, Redmond declared her candidacy for the leadership position when Hamilton-Smith refused to run. This leadership challenge was marked with infighting among the members and withdrawals from the shadow ministry. Iain Evans took over as the party leader.

Redmond opposed the suggested changes to DNA legislation in South Australia in June 2006. In December 2006, Premier Mike Rann criticised her for visiting a rave club with Sandra Kanck to understand how people used ecstasy. In February 2007, Redmond demanded more transparency in decisions on victims' compensation following the refusal of compensation to a victim of sexual assault. On 12 April 2007, Hamilton-Smith won against Evans and became the new Liberal leader.

In 2008, Redmond became the Shadow Minister of Arts and introduced legislation establishing the Independent Commission Against Corruption (ICAC). During February, she criticised the Rann government for being overly harsh on the outlaw motorcycle gangs through its laws. During May and June, she called for better protection and compensation for people victimised by law firms trust accounts scam and a guarantee scheme supported by the government. She in December expressed worry that the high cost of legal fees might discourage the Stolen Generations members from making claims.

Redmond was appointed Shadow Minister for Road Safety on 27 April 2009.

== Leader of the Opposition ==
=== Election as Liberal leader (2009) ===
Redmond served as Deputy Leader of the Opposition from 4 to 8 July 2009. Having spent seven years in the House of Assembly, she contested the Liberal Party leadership after the resignation of Hamilton-Smith. She defeated Vickie Chapman by 13 votes to nine in the party-room ballot held on 8 July, with Steven Griffiths elected as deputy leader. Redmond became the first female leader of a major political party in South Australia. Her appointment was preceded by tensions between Hamilton-Smith and Chapman. Redmond was considered to be an independent politician and was backed up by federal Liberal Senator Nick Minchin.

On 9 July, Redmond refuted Labor attacks on her position on the laws against outlaw motorcycle gangs by highlighting her voting record in Parliament. Redmond received the multicultural affairs portfolio on 20 July. She distanced herself from the Liberals' conference decision to debate the role of nuclear power in the Australian energy market on the grounds that the state needed to concentrate on its tax system and water supply problems. Redmond also defended the fundraising activities of the party and endorsed future restrictions on donations, as long as those restrictions were to be equal for the two major political parties.

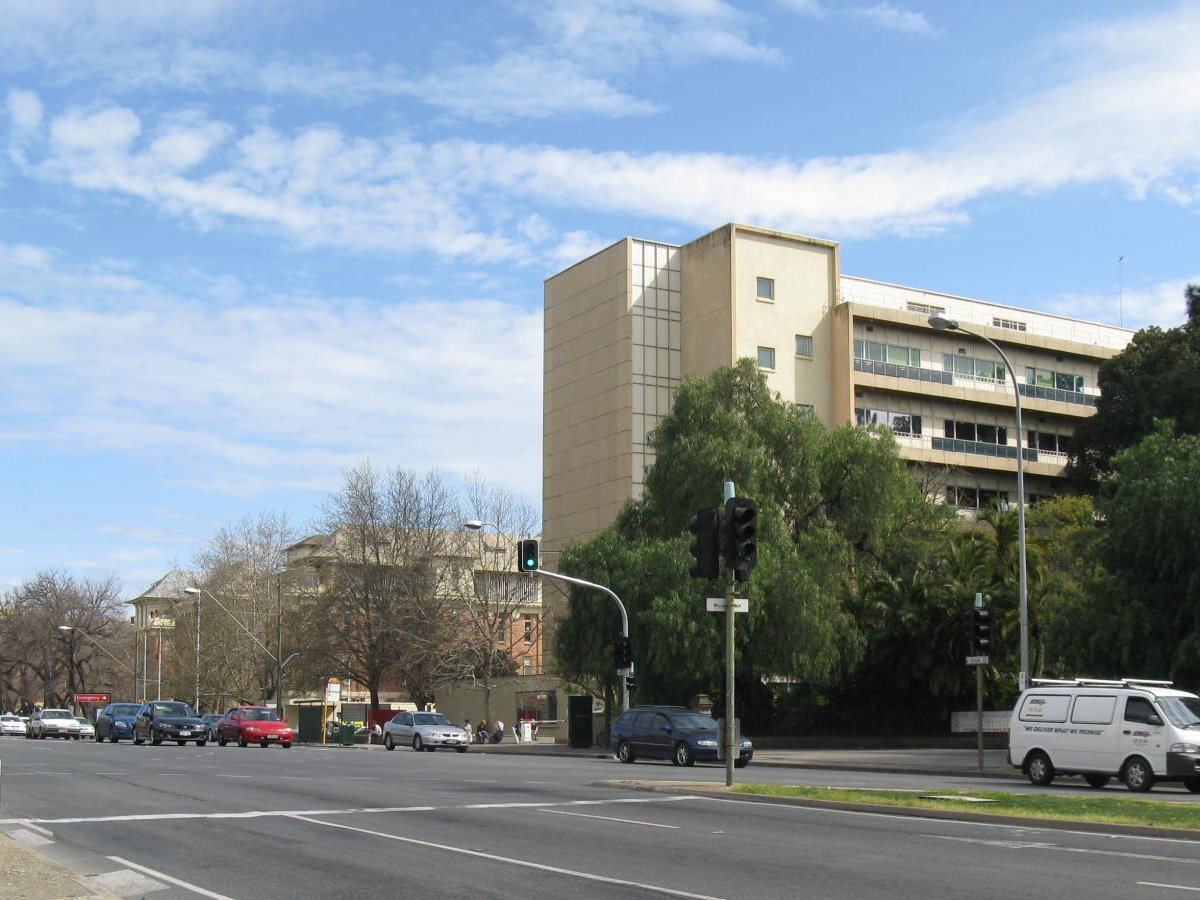
The Royal Adelaide Hospital on North Terrace, looking west in 2008

In October, Redmond was in favour of increased deployment of tasers by the South Australia Police, and even offered to take part in a demonstration herself. The reasoning for this proposal was that tasers provided the police with a safer alternative to the use of guns. In November, she confirmed that she had taken part in a medical test and was ready to conduct a demonstration. During the same month, she revealed that the Liberals were going to develop the current site of the Royal Adelaide Hospital rather than construct a new one. On 15 December, former police constable George Hateley applied a five-second taser discharge to Redmond.

=== 2010 state election ===
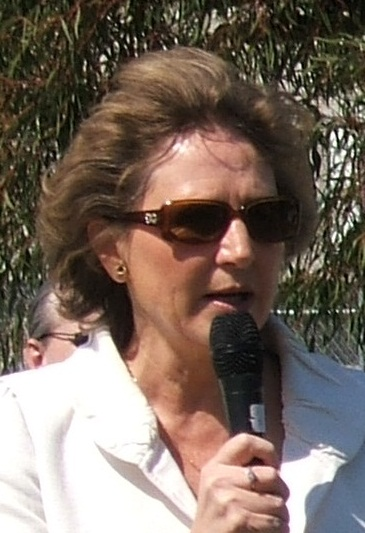
Redmond campaigning during the 2010 state election

Winning margins by electorate at the 2010 state election

On 26 January 2010, Redmond supported the idea put forward by federal Liberal leader Tony Abbott for a referendum on Murray–Darling basin management, noting that this would help the country achieve coordination at the national level. She announced in February that she would look into the problem of lack of Indigenous court interpreters, and revealed her plan to use recycled stormwater in the water supply system of Parafield. On 22 February, Redmond committed to setting up an ICAC in her government's first 100 days.

Under the leadership of Redmond, the Liberals went into the 2010 election against Premier Rann. Their campaign used the slogan "Redmond Is Ready" and aimed to compare the way Redmond leads and the way Rann does. According to polls, the election was expected to be tight, and the Liberals focused on criticising Labor's policies. Redmond admitted defeat in the election on 24 March.

=== Post-election opposition (2010–2011) ===
Redmond stayed as the Opposition Leader following the election. Hamilton-Smith was once again elected deputy Liberal leader, beating Iain Evans nine votes to eight after Mitch Williams was knocked out in the party room ballot. On 7 April, Redmond was named Shadow Minister for ICAC. On 16 April, she sought additional parliamentary sitting days since the current schedule meant that the scrutiny of the government could not be conducted sufficiently in the House of Assembly. On 27 May, she introduced a bill for ICAC.

In August 2010, Redmond stated that Liberals were yet considering mining operations at the Arkaroola Wilderness Sanctuary. In November, she lambasted the government for marketing the establishment of Cranfield University in Adelaide, which had no functioning campus.

Attorney-General John Rau proposed the formation of an Office of Public Integrity to handle complaints and channel them to the appropriate authorities in April 2011. According to Redmond, this proposal failed to satisfy the requirements for an independent anti-corruption commission. She also made a call for a more transparent appointment system and the use of merit for public sector appointments in August after the appointment of Jane Lomax-Smith to head the South Australian Museum. Redmond further proposed a review of parliamentary travel allowances for family members in November.

On 8 December 2011, Redmond was appointed Shadow Minister for the Arts.

=== Leadership challenge and ICAC legislation (2012–2013) ===
However, in 2012 saw Redmond coming under internal criticism following the leaking of letters from 2006, in which she had warned of taking legal action against a levy on the MPs salaries. Her leaving the country on 11 August without letting her colleagues know caused more rumors about the rifts in the party. Although Redmond admitted the presence of internal tension, she also claimed that the majority of people were supporting her. On 14 September, Redmond apologised for calling for large cuts in public sector jobs, explaining that there was no numerical target set by the party.

By October, the discontent with Redmond's leadership increased, and Hamilto-Smith contested her. Redmond won the leadership by 13 votes to 12, stating that the party was going to move on to the next state elections. Steven Marshall recognised the internal conflicts in the party and declared his support for Redmond. Hamilton-Smith was ousted from the shadow cabinet and Marshall became deputy Liberal leader.

Redmond took the position of the road safety minister on 6 November. The following month, the Liberals and Weatherill government clashed over the changes to the ICAC bill, including the nomination of the commissioner. The bill was passed on 29 November. Redmond supported the creation of the commission but noted that it should be able to conduct both public and secret investigations because too much secrecy would destroy the trust of the people in it.

On 20 January 2013, Redmond suggested decentralisation of the South Australian Education Department based of the low administrative-to-student ratio in Victoria. On 30 January, she explained that the policy was designed to grant autonomy to schools, adding that the Liberals did not have a target for cuts in staffing.

== Later parliamentary career ==
=== Resignation as leader and re-election (2013–2014) ===
Redmond resigned from her position as the leader of the South Australian Liberal Party on 31 January 2013 after over three years of being in the position due to continued rifts within the party. She stated that it was for the best interests of the party before the upcoming state elections and added that she would continue to serve as the member for Heysen. Former federal foreign minister, Alexander Downer, denied running for the leadership position but indicated his readiness to join the state politics. Marshall replaced Redmond and indicated that he will seek her guidance before the elections.

Redmond kept her seat at the 2014 state election with 12,768 first-preference votes (55.5 per cent) and 61.0 per cent of the two-party-preferred vote. This was a swing of 5.5 percentage points against the Liberals. In June, the Attorney-General Rau, urged Speaker Michael Atkinson to review whether Redmond had abused her use of parliamentary privilege and misled the House when she referred to Electoral Commissioner Kay Mousley as "utterly corrupt". On 15 October, Redmond invoked parliamentary privilege when she labelled Adelaide lord mayor Stephen Yarwood "unfit for office".

=== Backbench activity and retirement (2015–2018) ===
Redmond was against a bipartisan bill in October 2015 which barred any people connected with criminal organisations from either owning or working in a tattoo shop. According to her, the bill had the potential to punish people without even proving they did something wrong and that it might affect the rule of law and separation of powers. The bill was accepted in both houses of parliament. On 19 November, Redmond presented Summary Offences (Drones) Amendment Bill 2015.

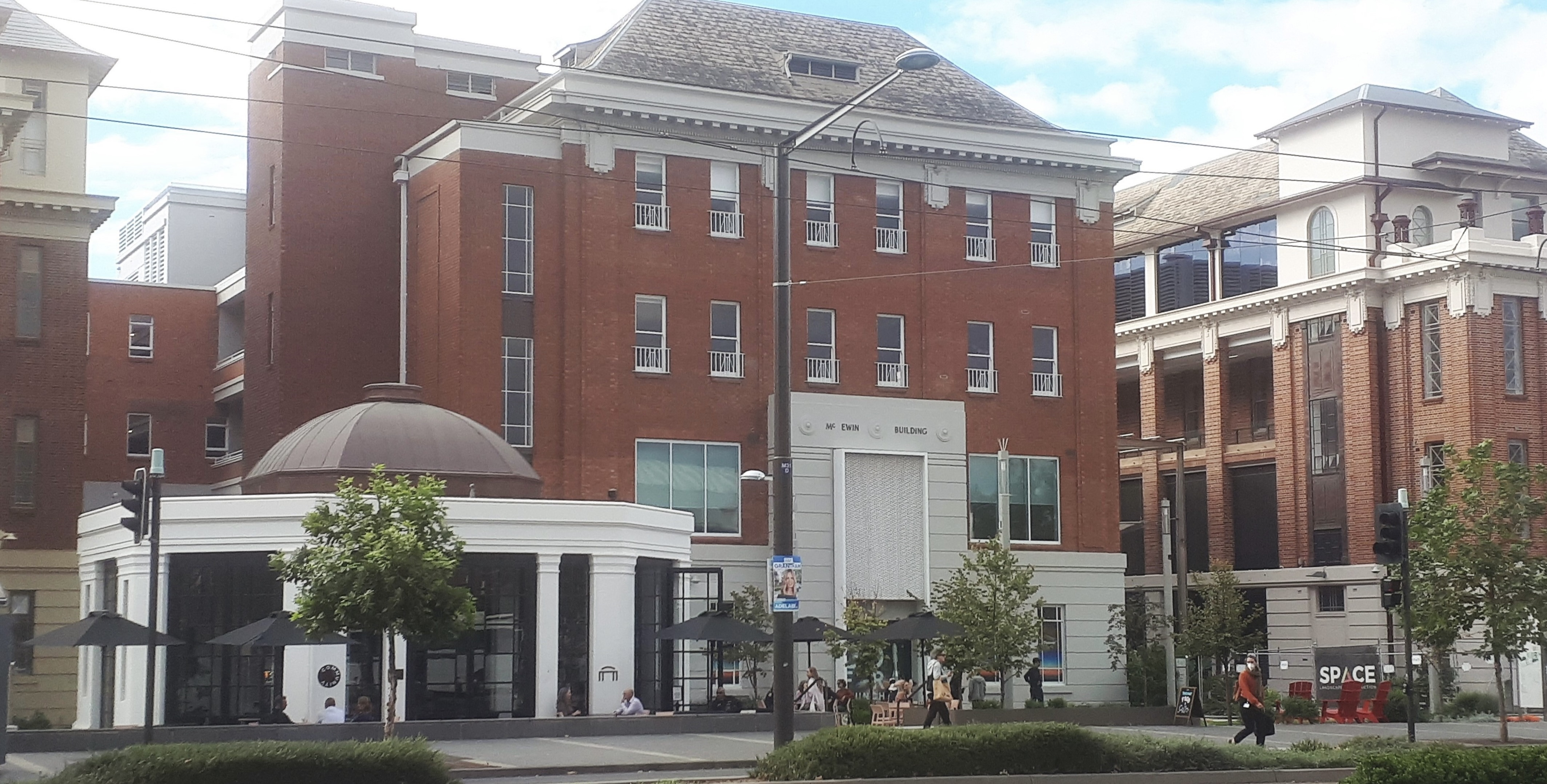
The Sheridan Kiosk and McEwin Building at Lot Fourteen, on the former Royal Adelaide Hospital site, on 20 April 2022

On 22 February 2016, Redmond objected to the intention of building private developments in a certain section of the old Royal Adelaide Hospital site. She suggested that the proposal could be seen as privatising a section of the Adelaide Park Lands and added that she may consider presenting a private member's bill or fighting against the development. The government replied that it was just about leases. In December, Marshall said that any appointment of Redmond in the cabinet would rely on whether she contested in the next election.

In May 2016, Troy Bell contacted Redmond by phone in regard to a police investigation that had been sparked by an inquiry conducted by the ICAC. Redmond advised him to seek legal counsel. This discussion came up in District Court proceedings concerning Bell.

Redmond announced on 18 January 2017 that she would be retiring from parliament during the 2018 state election. She had been contemplating retiring from the parliament for quite a while now due to the demands of being a member of parliament. Josh Teague replaced her in the role of member for Heysen.

== Retirement and later life ==
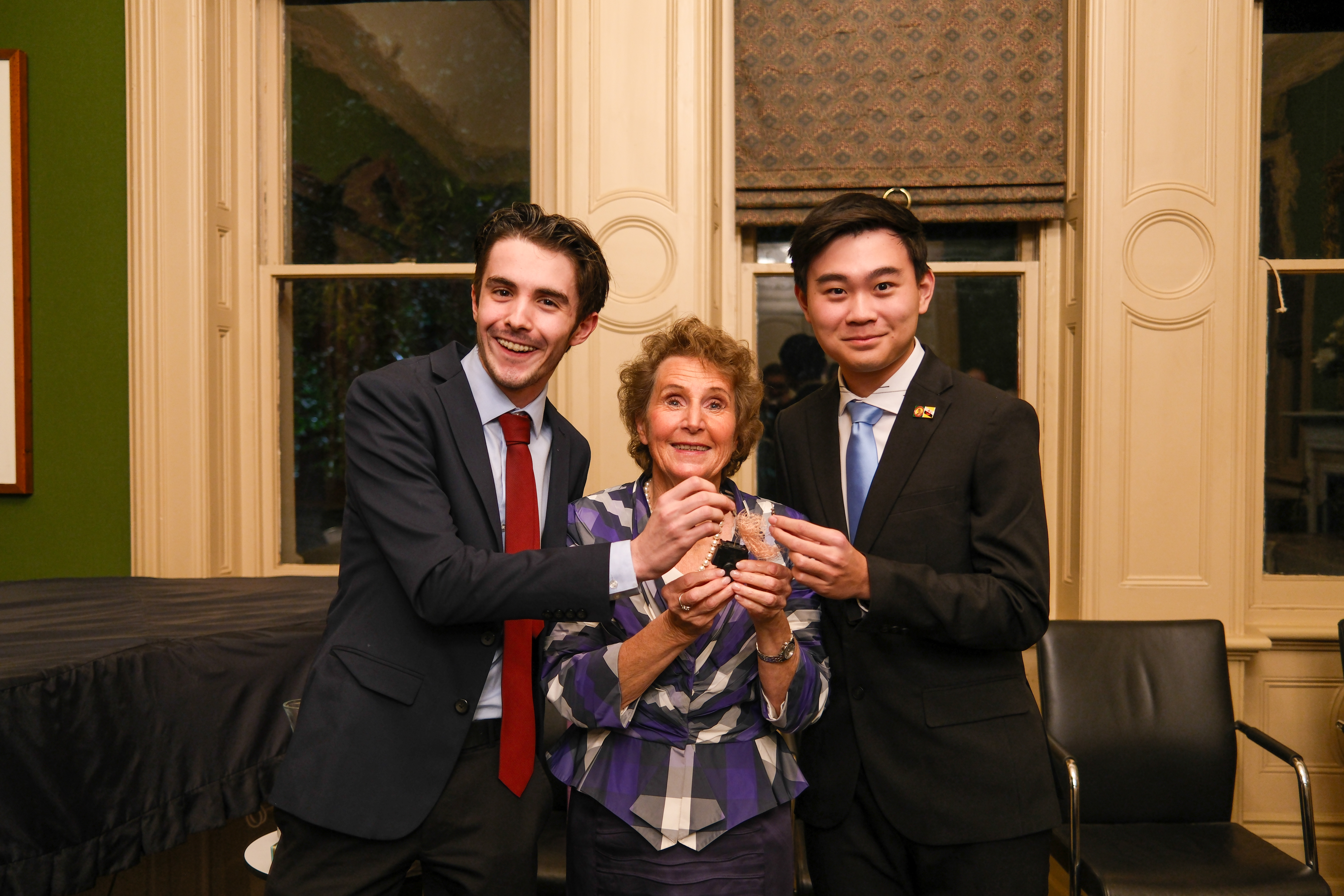
Ashton Charvetto (left) and Redmond (centre) holding taser probes following a talk at St. Mark's College, May 2026

Redmond supported the candidature of Greg Mackie for Adelaide City Council on 30 April 2020. As of April 2022, Redmond had become a patron of the Justice Reform Initiative in South Australia.

In July 2022, Redmond was named a member of the Liberal Party of South Australia's Women Attract Women taskforce whose aim was to encourage more women to join the party and run for political offices. In March 2023, the Women Attract Women taskforce made recommendations to pre-select women for half of the available seats at the 2026 state election and equalize representation among state MPs of the party within three terms of parliament.

In October 2023, Redmond started a campaign against the proposed move of Stirling Community Hospital to Mount Barker based on her experience of serving as a board member of the hospital for 22 years.

As of 2026, Redmond is a board member of Craniofacial Australia and a patron of Hahndorf Academy.

== Honours ==
In June 2004, Redmond received a Paul Harris Fellowship for her exceptional contributions to the Stirling Rotary Club.

== Personal life ==
In 1974, Redmond married James Lee Redmond, an American academic. They have three children.

Parliament of South Australia
Preceded by David Wotton	Member for Heysen; 2002–2018	Succeeded by Josh Teague
Party political offices
Preceded by Martin Hamilton-Smith	Leader of the Liberal Party of Australia (South Australian Division); 2009–2013	Succeeded by Steven Marshall
Political offices
Preceded by Martin Hamilton-Smith	Leader of the Opposition of South Australia; 2009–2013	Succeeded by Steven Marshall
Preceded by Vickie Chapman	Deputy Leader of the Opposition in South Australia; 2009	Succeeded by Steven Griffiths
