= Leonora Polkinghorne =

Australian writer and women's activist

- Born: Leonora Ethel Twiss; 1873; Ballarat, Victoria
- Died: 11 May 1953 (aged 79–80); Indian Ocean
- Occupations: teacher; activist; writer
- Writing career
- Pen name: Cecil Warren

Leonora Ethel Polkinghorne (née Twiss) (1873 – 11 May 1953) was an Australian women's activist and writer.

== Biography ==
Polkinghorne was born in Ballarat, Victoria, but subsequently moved to South Australia as a child. She was a teacher before her marriage, teaching mathematics and French at the Christ Church Day School in North Adelaide and later becoming co-principal. She became involved in politics around 1909, when she became a founding member of the Women's Non-Party Association of South Australia (later the League of Women Voters) and honorary treasurer of the short-lived Registered Governesses Association. She married Oswald Polkinghorne in December 1910. They had five children.

She served as president of the South Australian division of the Housewives' Association in 1928–29. She was also a vice-president and executive member of the Women's Non-Party Association for a period in the late 1920s and early 1930s, taking over as president from 1938 to 1940. She unsuccessfully contested the 1930 state election as an independent candidate aligned with the Women's Non-Party Association. Her platform consisted of proportional representation, more support for maternal and child welfare, early closing of hotels on Saturdays, "proper control of the feeble-minded", decentralisation, changes to taxation, and "economy of administration in government service". She was touted as an independent candidate for the 1938 election, but did not nominate. During World War II, Polkinghorne, by then a "noted pacifist", spoke out against conscription during that war and dismissed the value of widespread school fundraising to support the war effort.

She wrote several novels as "Cecil Warren", some in collaboration with Kate Margaret Stone ("Sydney Partrige"), not all of which were published, and contributed poetry and prose to several early twentieth century literary magazines.

She died on 11 May 1953 in the Indian Ocean whilst on board the liner SS Oronsay en route to Copenhagen, where she had been due to represent the state branch of the Union of Australian Women at the Women's World Congress. She was buried in Colombo, Sri Lanka.
