= Audrey Cummins Morphett =

Australian community worker (1902–1983)

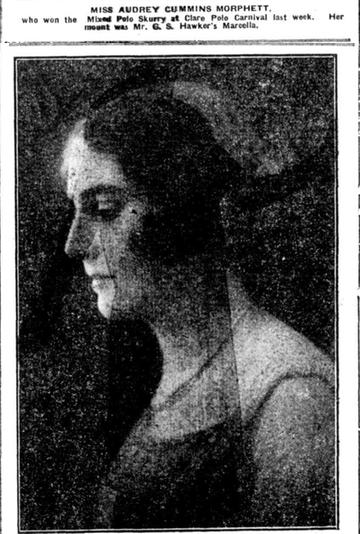
Audrey Cummins Morphett in 1925

Audrey Cummins Morphett OBE (27 May 1902 – 8 October 1983) was an Australian woman who was a community worker, involved in many charitable organisations, and a historian who worked closely with her father George Cummins Morphett.

During World War II she worked as the senior inspector of women workers at a munitions factor in Salisbury which was then the largest in Australia.

== Biography ==
Morphett was born in Mount Gambier in South Australia and she was the eldest of three children born to George Cummins Morphett and his wife Violet Alice (née Anderson). Her father was a stock and station agent and, because of this, she grew up on farms in the region and developed a love of horses. Morphett would sometimes ride her horse 97 kilometres (60 mi) a day and won races at country shows and carnivals throughout the region.

Morphett attended school at the Geelong Church of England Girls' Grammar School and completed her studies there between 1918 and 1920.

In 1923 she moved, with her family, to the home her great-grandfather, John Morphett, had built at Morphettville a suburb of Adelaide. While living there Morphett volunteered for a number of organisations, including the Australian Red Cross, Girl Guides (for South Australia and the Northern Territory) and the Royal Society for the Prevention of Cruelty to Animals. In 1927 she also joined the Ladies’ Harbour Lights Guild and became its president and a major fundraiser for them and this involvement would continue until at least the 1950s.

From 1933 until 1955 Morphett also offered significant help to her father in preparing his books and other publications, primarily relating to South Australian history, for publication. Moprhett would also produce her own works, often in the form of essay, an exhibition or letters to the editor of newspapers such as The Advertiser.

Morphett would often travel overseas or to the Northern Territory and other parts of northern Australia during the winter months.

In 1938, during the lead up to World War II, Morphett began training to instruct civilians in air-raid precautions, in delivering first aid and how to respond in poison gas attacks. She also became the assistant-commandant of South Australia's Voluntary Aid Detachment and, despite her involvement in the war effort, she was rejected from the Australian Women's Army Service when she sought to enlist because she was then 39 years old (women like Nellie Elizabeth Stronach successfully lied about their age to enlist). Instead Morphett became the senior inspector of women workers at a munitions factor in Salisbury and, later, trained in explosives manufacture in Melbourne. She resigned in late 1943.

The munitions factory in Sailsbury was then the largest in Australia and the work with TNT often caused the women working there to become unwell and led to a high turn over rate of 10% a month. All objects which could cause a spark within the factory, including metal, cigarettes matches, watches and buttons, were also not allowed and clothing was taped to the body. Morphett said of the working conditions:

Cordite was bad to work with. Some girls could not tolerate it. They became ill. They would absorb it through their skin. It smelled badly too.

We inspected explosives only. Caps, detonators, fuses, cordite. We were not involved in making shells, only explosives. One got quite used to it. Outside the actual work rooms we inspectors went on our rounds along "clear areas" and "gritless walkways" built up three feet above ground. Dressed in or protective gear, we were careful to stay on the walkway, as we must not soil our footwear in case we caused sparks.

There were little rooms sticking out from these pathways where the girls worked filling caps with explosives. Inspecting the detonator work was precise, watching for the height of the filling in the cap as this is the detonator, and if this does not detonate, a weapon has lost its whole explosion. It was all routine work, but with a difference.

I was walking on the "clearway" towards a room to inspect it and the girl workers when it blew - one woman was among those killed. Their work was very dangerous... but there was always laughter...

— Audrey Cummins Morphett, as quoted in "Australian Women at War" (1984) by Patsy Adam-Smith

After the war Morphett continued her involvement in various charities and, after the death of her parents, she was entitled to a third of the income from her parents estate and moved into a house at Unley Park.

In 1953 Morphett received the Queen Elizabeth II Coronation Medal and, in 1960, was appointed an Officer of the Order of the British Empire (OBE).

She died on 8 October 1983.

== Legacy ==
Audrey Street in Novar Gardens, South Australia is named for Morphett.
