= Robert Otto Homburg =

Australian politician

Robert Homburg
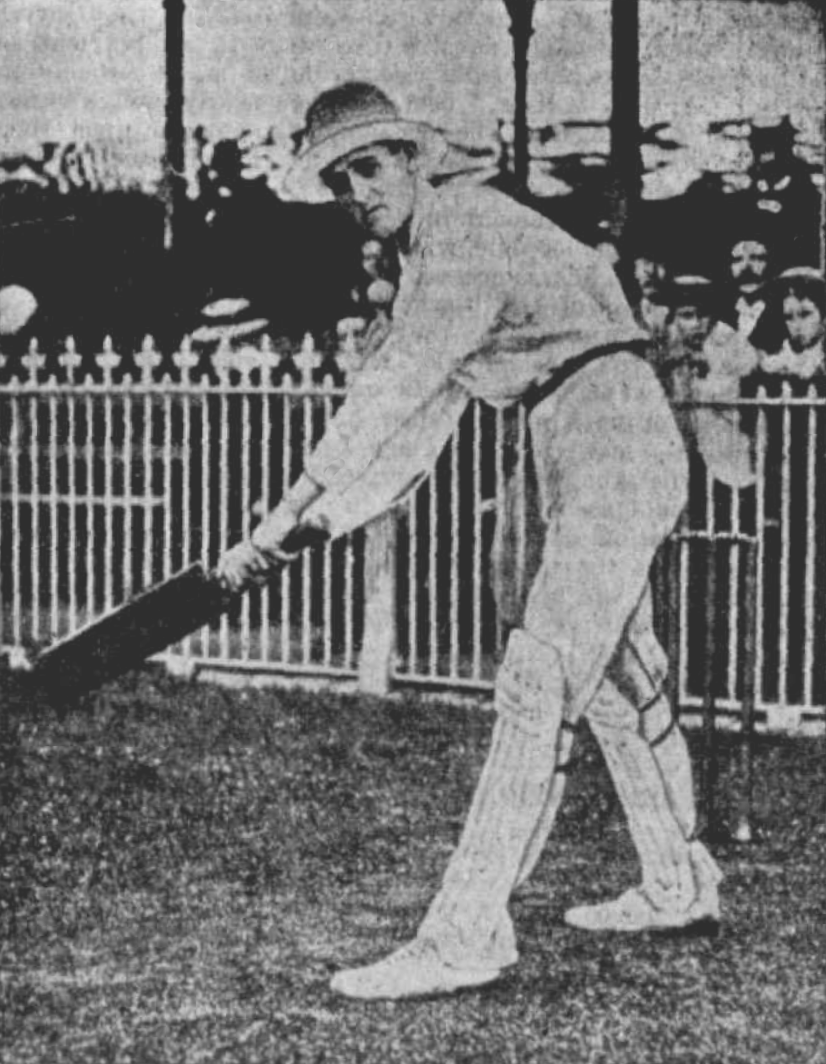

Member of the South Australian House of Assembly for Burra Burra
- In office October 1912 – 26 March 1915 Serving with Laurence O'Loughlin, William Miller
- Premier: Archibald Peake
- Preceded by: John Newlands
- Succeeded by: John Pick
- Parliamentary group: Liberal Union

Personal details
- Born: Robert Otto Homburg; 31 January 1876
- Died: 21 October 1948 (aged 72)
- Children: Three
- Parent: Robert Homburg (father)
- Relatives: Hermann Homburg (brother)
- Education: Prince Alfred College
- Alma mater: University of Adelaide
- Occupation: Lawyer
- Cricket career

Cricket information
- Batting: Right-handed
- Bowling: Right-arm fast-medium

Domestic team information
- Years: Team
- 1896/97–1898/99: South Australia
- FC debut: 1 January 1897 South Australia v Victoria
- Last FC: 3 April 1899 South Australia v Western Australia

Career statistics
Competition	First-class
Matches	2
Runs scored	21
Batting average	7.00
100s/50s	0/0
Top score	10
Balls bowled	162
Wickets	3
Bowling average	16.33
5 wickets in innings	0
10 wickets in match	0
Best bowling	3/18
Catches/stumpings	0/–
- Source: Cricinfo, 23 April 2019

Robert Otto Homburg (31 January 1876 – 21 October 1948) was an Australian politician who represented the South Australian House of Assembly multi-member seat of Burra Burra from 1912 to 1915 representing the Liberal Union. He resigned in 1915 to devote more time to the legal practice that both he and Hermann Homburg were partners in. He had also been the subject of "gross slanders" about his loyalty, due to their father having immigrated from Germany.

Homburg was an alderman in the Adelaide City Council for many years.

In his twenties, Homburg had been a member of the South Australian cricket team on two occasions. The first was a Sheffield Shield match between Victoria and South Australia played at the Melbourne Cricket Ground on 1–5 January 1897. The second was a first-class match between Western Australia and South Australia at the Western Australia Cricket Association Ground on 3–6 April 1899.

South Australian House of Assembly
Preceded by John Newlands	Member for Burra Burra; 1912–1915; Served alongside: Laurence O'Loughlin, William Miller	Succeeded by John Pick
