= Lucy Morice =

Australian social reformer (1859-1951)

Lucy Morice MBE
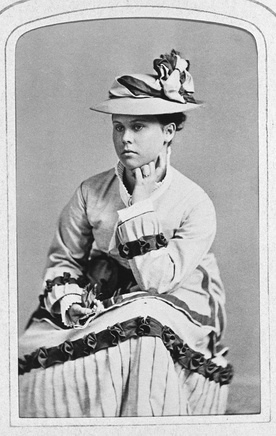
- Lucy Morice c.1886
- Born: Louise Spence; 1 March 1859; Adelaide, Australia
- Died: 10 June 1951 (aged 92)
- Occupations: kindergarten worker and social reformer
- Relatives: Catherine Helen Spence (aunt); John Brodie Spence (father)

Louise "Lucy" Morice MBE (born Louise Spence, 1 March 1859 – 10 June 1951) was a kindergarten worker and social reformer from Adelaide, Australia. She was a founder of the Working Women's Co-operative Clothing Company, the Kindergarten Union of South Australia, Mother's and Babies Health Association, and the League of Women Voters of South Australia.

== Early life ==
Morice was the daughter of John Brodie Spence (1824–1902), and official assignee, and Jessie Spence née Cumming (1830–1910). She had two sisters Agnes Helen Spence (1863–1949) and Margaret Ethel Spence (1865–).. Her aunt was Catherine Helen Spence. She married James Percy Morice (1858-1943) in 1886, and they had a son called Patrick.

== Career ==
=== Suffrage and politics ===
Morice founded the Women’s League in 1895, with her Aunt Catherine Helen Spence. Its purpose was to educate women in politics for the benefit of the welfare of women and children with a focus on effective voting. However, it was short lived, and Morice attributed this to women being absorbed into the existing party politics, and to men being afraid that of losing their control over democracy and fearing the disturbing ideas and suggestions that their mothers, wives, and sisters may bring into the political arena.

In 1909, at the suggestion of Vida Goldstein, Morice and Spence founded the Women's Non-Party Association of South Australia, which eventually became the League of Women Voters of South Australia.

=== Co-operative ===
In February 1902, Morice, her Aunty Catherine Spence, and Agnes Milne started a Working Women's Co-operative Clothing Company, with Milne as the manager, Morice listed as a housewife member, and Spence as the board chairman. If was the idea of Milne, and its purpose was to prevent sweating, and mutually benefit members of the cooperative, who were all women from many levels of society, providing them the means to overcome economic hardship. The two-story factory offered good working conditions, being clean and well-lit. It was the first clothing factory to use electricity. In 1910, Morice took over as the chairman of the board when Spence died. While the company initially flourished, it ended struggling against economic competition, and what Morice stated felt was a focus on individualism in society. In February 1913 Morice liquidated the company.

=== Kindergartens ===
Morice did not like regimented nature of state schools, and instead believed that Kindergartens were a way to improve the future society. She co-founded the Kindergarten Union of South Australia in 1905 with Lillian de Lissa, fundraising and fighting to keep the union independent. She held became the vice-president from 1932 until 1951. From 1908 until 1925 Morice was a lecturer for the Kindergarten Training College, specialising in history of education. She encouraged her students to read widely. Morice donated money to found a new Kindergarten which opened in lower north Adelaide, on Sussex St in 1935. It was called the Lucy Morice Free Kindergarten, in her honour.

=== School for mothers ===
Concerned by infant mortality, Morice, Helen Mayo, and Harriet Stirling wished to improve nutrition and hygiene for South Australian children. Inspired by a lecture from a visiting worker from the St Pancras school for mothers, they organised a public meeting at the Franklin Street Kindergarten in Adelaide city, which resulted in the foundation of a school for mothers. In 1912, the State government provided funding for the school, named the School for Mothers' Institute and Baby Health Centre to rent premises on Wright Street, Adelaide. It promoted breast feeding, provided instruction for bottle feeding, and provided basic medical support for mothers. Eventually the school became the Mother's and Babies Health Association in 1926, running 39 clinics in South Australia. The association is credited as contributing to South Australia having the lowest infant mortality rate in the world in 1937. The association was eventually amalgamated into what is known as the Child and Family Health Service.

Morice died on 10 June 1951 at the age of 92 while living in a nursing home. She was cremated, and requested that no one send flowers or wear mourning for her.

== Awards and roles ==
- From 1911 until 1912, Morice was on the board of the Adelaide Literary Theatre.
- Morice was appointed a member of the Order of the British Empire in 1936 for her service to social welfare.
- Morice and her husband helped to found the Adelaide Fabian group after meeting
