= Frank Staniford =

Australian politician

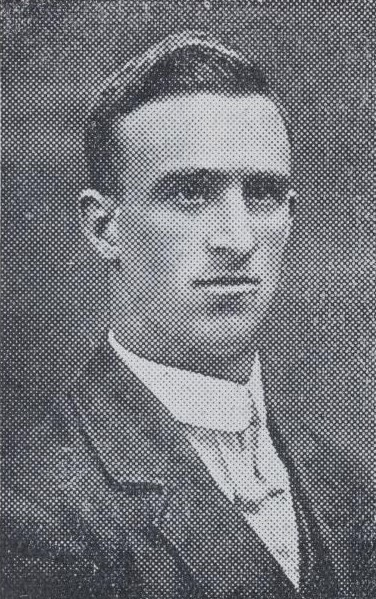

Frank Clement Staniford (20 March 1893 – 25 August 1987) was an Australian politician. He represented the South Australian House of Assembly multi-member seat of Murray from 1924 to 1927 and 1930 to 1933 for the Labor Party. He was Chairman of Committees under Lionel Hill in his second term, and was Minister for Education, Minister for Immigration, Minister for Labour and Employment and Minister for Local Government in the short-lived Richards Ministry of 1933, following the 1932 Labor split.

Staniford was born at Summertown and educated at Uraidla Public School after which he, like his father, became a fruitgrower. He served as secretary of the Labor Party branch in his teens and was secretary of the Summertown Institute and the Uraidla Hospital, president of the Uraidla Agricultural and Horticultural Society, president of the local agricultural bureau and secretary of the Mount Lofty Football Association. He was involved in the South Australian Fruitgrowers and Market Gardeners' Association for many years, eventually being elected president in 1933. Staniford was also a lay Methodist preacher.

He was first elected at the 1924 election, but was defeated after one term. He regained his seat at the 1930 election defeating Attorney-General Hermann Homburg. He served as Chairman of Committees during Lionel Hill's government, and followed Hill out of the Labor Party in the 1931 Labor split, joining the Parliamentary Labor Party. Staniford was promoted to the ministry when Hill resigned and was replaced by Robert Richards, and held four ministries for the two months until their minority government fell. He lost his seat at the ensuing election. Staniford was a delegate to the Labor unity conference in 1934 that negotiated the reuniting of the Labor Party. He unsuccessfully attempted to re-enter parliament several times: as an independent at the 1938 election, as a Labor candidate for the Legislative Council at the 1947 election and again for Labor in his old seat at the 1950 election.

He married Gwendoline Johnston at Goolwa in December 1926. Johnston was the great-granddaughter of Murray River pioneer George Bain Johnston.
