= David Wotton =

Australian politician

The Honourable David Wotton AM

Member for Heysen
- In office 1975–2002
- Succeeded by: Isobel Redmond

Personal details
- Born: 14 August 1942 (age 83)
- Party: Liberal Party

David Charles Wotton AM (born 14 August 1942) is a former Australian politician. He was a Liberal Party member of the South Australian House of Assembly between 1975 and 2002, representing the electorates of Murray and Heysen.

Aside from the 1982 Mitcham by-election, Wotton presided over the closest win versus the Democrats in South Australian history, winning against them by a two-candidate preferred margin of 1.9% in the 1997 election.

In 2012 he was made a Member of the Order of Australia (AM) "For service to the Parliament and community of South Australia through contributions to environmental management, family and community services, and the ageing".

Parliament of South Australia
Preceded by William McAnaney	Member for Heysen; 1975–1977	Succeeded by Electorate abolished
Preceded by Ivon Wardle	Member for Murray; 1977–1985	Succeeded by Electorate abolished
Preceded by Electorate recreated	Member for Heysen; 1985–2002	Succeeded by Isobel Redmond
