= League of Women Voters of South Australia =

Former women's organisation in South Australia

The League of Women Voters of South Australia (formerly the Women's Non-Party Political Association of South Australia) was a women's organisation in South Australia from 1909 to 1979.

It was founded in June 1909 by Lucy Morice in conjunction with Victorian activist Vida Goldstein. Catherine Helen Spence became the first president, while Leonora Polkinghorne was one of the first councillors. Phyllis Duguid held numerous offices within the organisation, and was its last president before it disbanded in 1979.
