= List of native title claims in South Australia =

List of native title claims in the state of South Australia, with results

Native title in Australia is the common law doctrine which is the recognition by Australian law that Indigenous Australians have rights and interests to their land that derive from their traditional laws and customs. Native title claims may be made in any Australian jurisdiction under the Native Title Act 1993. Claims made in the State of South Australia are listed below by date of lodgement. Claims are claimed by the federal and the state government.

Date lodged	Claimant	Claim type	Location	Area	Status	Result
22 January 2015	Barngarla	Determination	Eyre Peninsula	44,500 km^{2} (17,200 sq mi)	Finalised	Non-exclusive rights
30 March 2009	Adnyamathanha	Determination	Flinders Ranges	41,085 km^{2} (15,863 sq mi)	Finalised	Non-exclusive rights
27 March 2008	Dawn Margaret Brown	Application	North-West	Unspecified	Finalised	Struck-out
26 September 2008	Dieri	Application	Eastern	52,737 km^{2} (20,362 sq mi)	Finalised	Non-exclusive rights
11 September 2008	Wangkangurru/Yarluyandi	Determination	Witjira National Park	7,770 km^{2} (3,000 sq mi)	Finalised	Non-exclusive rights
13 August 2007	Arunda - Yunkunjatjara Nguraritja	Application	NW Central	53,040 km^{2} (20,480 sq mi)	Finalised	Struck-out
24 May 2007	Kokatha	Application	Central	178,000 km^{2} (69,000 sq mi)	Finalised	Struck-out
16 February 2006	Kuyani-Wilyaru	Application	Central	Unspecified	Finalised	Discontinued
8 June 2005	Yankunytjatjara	Determination	North-West	1,865 km^{2} (720 sq mi)	Finalised	Non-exclusive rights
22 December 2000	Kuyani	Application	Central eastern	96,040 km^{2} (37,080 sq mi)	Finalised	Struck-out
25 October 2000	Kaurna	Application	Fleurieu to Port Wakefield	8,160 km^{2} (3,150 sq mi)	Finalised	Non-exclusive rights

== See also ==
- Registered Native Title Body Corporate
