= Gabe Bywaters =

Australian politician

Gabriel Alexander Bywaters (2 September 1914 — 2 November 2004) was an Australian politician who represented the South Australian House of Assembly seat of Murray from 1956 to 1968 for the Labor Party.
