= William Stock =

English priest and academic

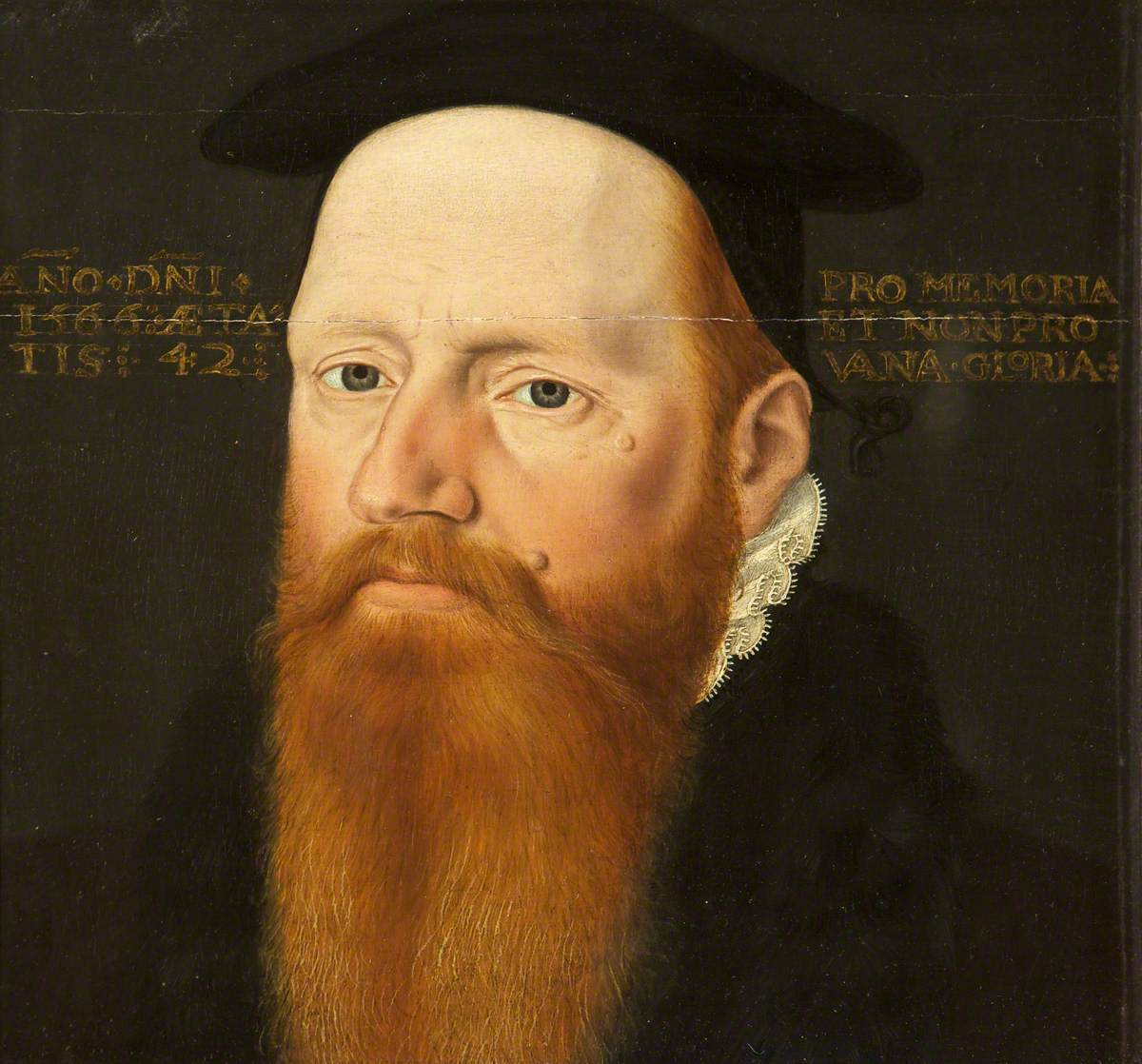
A portrait of a gentleman, sometimes identified as William Stock

William Stock, D.D. was an English priest and academic.

Stock was born in Herefordshire. A Fellow of Brasenose College, Oxford, he was the first Principal of Gloucester Hall and the third president of St Johns. He held Livings at Sherborne, Gloucestershire, Minety, Marston Sicca, Crick, Northamptonshire, Ilmington, Freckenham, Idlicote, Northampton St. Peter and, Upton St. Michael. He died in 1607.
