= Electoral district of Murray (South Australia) =

Former state electoral district of South Australia

Coordinates: 34°55′S 139°20′E

Murray South Australia—House of Assembly
- State: South Australia
- Created: 1902
- Abolished: 1985
- Namesake: Murray River
- Demographic: Rural

Murray is a defunct electoral district that elected members to the House of Assembly, the lower house of the bicameral legislature of the Australian state of South Australia. The electorate, incorporating part of the River Murray, was rural in nature, with Mannum the only large town within its boundaries. From its establishment to the 1938 state election, Murray was a three-member electorate, but was made a single-member electorate afterwards, as part of a system of electoral malapportionment known as the "Playmander". In both incarnations it elected candidates from both major parties as marginal and safe seat holders at various times. If just 21 LCL votes were Labor votes in Murray at the 1968 election, Labor would have formed majority government. Murray was one of two gains in 1968 that put the LCL in office. The electorate was abolished prior to the 1985 election, with its territory now forming part of the districts of Hammond, Kavel, and Schubert. In total, 24 people represented Murray between 1902 and 1985, with its most notable member being Thomas Playford IV, who later served as Premier of South Australia.

== List of members ==
First incarnation (1902–1938, 3 members)
Member	Party	Term	Member	Party	Term	Member	Party	Term
Walter Duncan	National League	1902–1906	Friedrich Pflaum		1902–1905	Robert Homburg	National League	1902–1905
Walter Duncan	National League	1902–1906	Friedrich Pflaum	National League	1905–1910	William Jamieson	National League	1905–1906
Hermann Homburg	National League	1906–1910	Friedrich Pflaum	National League	1905–1910	William Jamieson	Liberal and Democratic	1906–1910
Hermann Homburg	Liberal Union	1910–1915	Friedrich Pflaum	Liberal Union	1910–1915	William Jamieson	Liberal Union	1910–1912
Hermann Homburg	Liberal Union	1910–1915	Friedrich Pflaum	Liberal Union	1910–1915	Harry Young	Liberal Union	1912–1923
George Dunn	Labor	1915–1917	Maurice Parish	Labor	1915–1917	Harry Young	Liberal Union	1912–1923
George Dunn	National	1917–1918	Maurice Parish	National	1917–1918	Harry Young	Liberal Union	1912–1923
George Dunn	National	1917–1918	Maurice Parish	Independent	1918–1918	Harry Young	Liberal Union	1912–1923
Sid O'Flaherty	Labor	1918–1921	Herbert Parsons	Liberal Union	1918–1921	Harry Young	Liberal Union	1912–1923
John Godfree	Liberal Union	1921–1923	John Randell	Liberal Union	1921–1923	Harry Young	Liberal Union	1912–1923
John Godfree	Liberal Federation	1923–1924	John Randell	Liberal Federation	1923–1924	Harry Young	Liberal Federation	1923–1927
Clement Collins	Labor	1924–1933	Frank Staniford	Labor	1924–1927	Harry Young	Liberal Federation	1923–1927
Clement Collins	Labor	1924–1933	Ernest Hannaford	Liberal Federation	1927–1930	Hermann Homburg	Liberal Federation	1927–1930
Clement Collins	Labor	1924–1933	Frank Staniford	Labor	1930–1931	Robert Hunter	Labor	1930–1931
Clement Collins	Parliamentary Labor	1931–1933	Frank Staniford	Parliamentary Labor	1931–1933	Robert Hunter	Parliamentary Labor	1931–1933
George Morphett	Liberal and Country	1933–1938	Thomas Playford IV	Liberal and Country	1933–1938	Howard Shannon	Liberal and Country	1933–1938
Second incarnation (1938–1977)
Member	Party	Term						
Richard McKenzie	Independent	1938–1943						
Richard McKenzie	Labor	1943–1953						
Hector White	Liberal and Country	1953–1956						
Gabe Bywaters	Labor	1956–1968						
Ivon Wardle	Liberal and Country	1968–1974						
Ivon Wardle	Liberal	1974–1977						
David Wotton	Liberal	1977–1985						
