= Ivon Wardle =

Australian politician

Ivon Alfred Wardle OAM (23 March 1919 – 26 November 2013) was an Australian politician who represented the South Australian House of Assembly seat of Murray from 1968 to 1977 for the Liberal and Country League (LCL) and Liberal Party.

If just 21 LCL votes were Labor votes in Murray at the 1968 election, Labor would have formed majority government instead of the LCL forming minority government.

Wardle was awarded the Medal of the Order of Australia in 1995 for "service to the South Australian Parliament, to the community through the Uniting Church in Australia and to aged care".
