= Richard McKenzie (South Australian politician) =

Australian politician

Richard Lawrence McKenzie (8 January 1883 – 13 June 1959) was an Australian politician who represented the South Australian House of Assembly seat of Murray from 1938 to 1953. Elected as an independent, he joined Labor in 1943.

He was one of 14 of 39 lower house MPs at the 1938 election to be elected as an independent, which as a grouping won 40 percent of the primary vote, more than either of the major parties. Tom Stott was the de facto leader of the independent caucus within parliament.
