= 1930 South Australian state election =

- 5 April 1930

All 46 seats in the South Australian House of Assembly 24 seats were needed for a majority
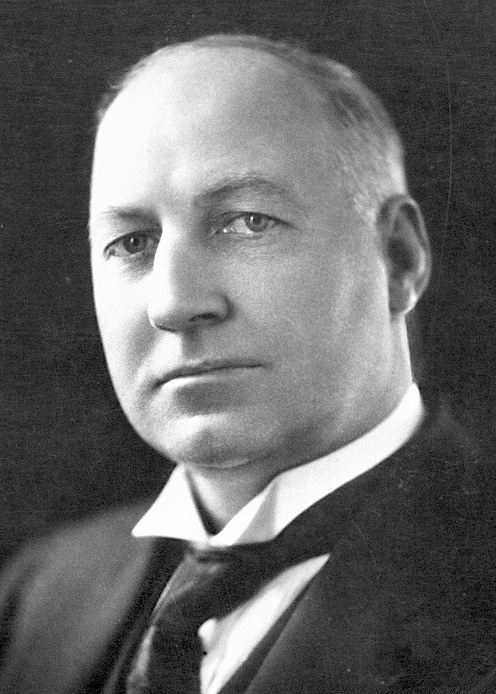

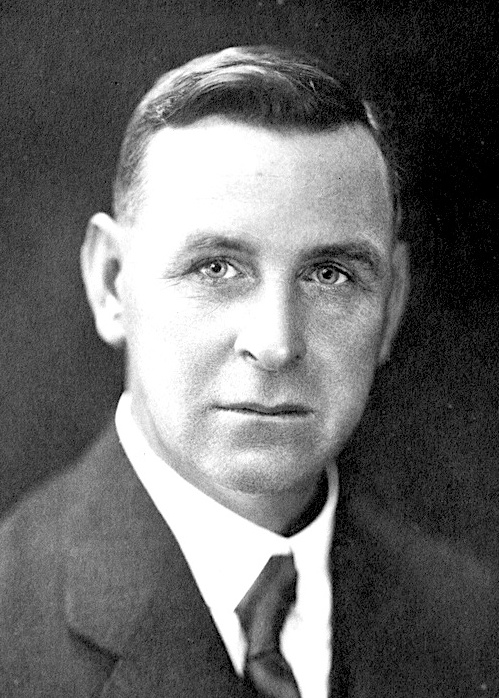
	First party	Second party
Leader	Lionel Hill	Richard L. Butler
Party	Labor	Liberal Federation
Leader since	28 August 1926	17 December 1925
Leader's seat	Port Pirie	Wooroora
Last election	16 seats	23 seats
Seats won	30 seats	13 seats
Seat change	▲14	▼10
Percentage	48.64%	35.66%
Swing	▲0.65	▼4.36
Premier before election
Richard L. Butler
Liberal Federation
Elected Premier
Lionel Hill
Labor

State elections were held in South Australia on 5 April 1930. All 46 seats in the South Australian House of Assembly were up for election. The incumbent Liberal Federation government led by Premier of South Australia Richard L. Butler was defeated by the opposition Australian Labor Party led by Leader of the Opposition Lionel Hill.

Each district elected multiple members. This election saw the change from first past the post (plurality) to instant-runoff (preferential) voting, which also meant that electors cast a single vote rather than multiple votes. With 30 of 46 seats in the House of Assembly, the election remained South Australian Labor's biggest seat win until the record was exceeded in 2026.

== Results ==
Arrangement of the House of Assembly after the 1930 state election.

South Australian state election, 5 April 1930 House of Assembly << 1927–1933 >>
Enrolled voters	325,244				
Votes cast	222,819		Turnout	71.36%	–6.07%
Informal votes	12,715		Informal	5.71%	
Summary of votes by party
Party	Primary votes	%	Swing	Seats	Change
Labor	102,194	48.64%	+0.65%	30	+ 14
Liberal Federation	74,930	35.66%	–4.34%	13	– 10
Country	14,555	6.93%	+1.43%	2	– 3
Single Tax League	2,777	1.32%	+1.32%	1	+ 1
Communist	696	0.33%	+0.33%	0	± 0
Independent	14,952	7.11%	+0.57%	0	± 0
Total	210,104			46	

== See also ==
- Results of the South Australian state election, 1930 (House of Assembly)
- Candidates of the South Australian state election, 1930
- Members of the South Australian House of Assembly, 1930–1933
- Members of the South Australian Legislative Council, 1930–1933
