= George Cummins Morphett =

Australian politician

- Mr. and Mrs. G. C. Morphett, their son, Hurtle Cummins Morphett and grandson John Cummins Morphett, on the occasion of their golden wedding anniversary, 12 June 1951
- Born: 1876; Adelaide, Australia
- Citizenship: Australian
- Parent: John Morphett (father)

George Cummins Morphett (1876 - 1963) was an Australian politician. He was a member of the South Australian House of Assembly from 1933 to 1938, representing the electorate of Murray.

Morphett was born in Adelaide, the grandson of Sir John Morphett and son of John Cummins Morphett, clerk of the House of Assembly from 1901 to 1918.

He published a number of works about his grandfather, including "The Life And Letters of Sir John Morphett" and his grandfather's entry in the Australian Dictionary of Biography. Other works include:

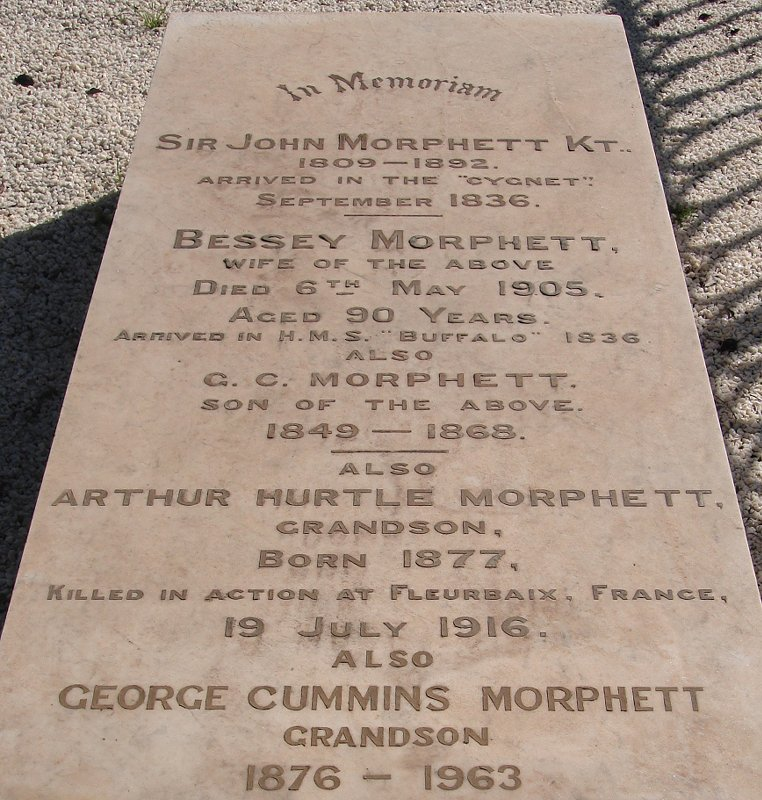
Gravestone at West Terrace Cemetery.

- Captain Francis Davison of Blakiston, Adelaide : Pioneers' Association of S.A., 1943
- The Bakers of Morialta : Hon. John Baker, M.L.C., J.P., F.R.G.S. and his son Sir Richard Chaffey Baker, K.C.M.G., Q.C., M.A. (Cantab), Adelaide : Pioneers' Association of S.A., 1946
- John Ainsworth Horrocks, Adelaide : Pioneers' Association of S.A., 1946
- The Beare Family, Adelaide : Pioneers' Association of South Australia, 1942
- Founders of South Australia, Adelaide : Pioneers' Association of S.A., 1944

and numerous others.

In his work he was helped regularly by his daughter Audrey Cummins Morphett who helped prepare his manuscripts for publication.
