= Hermann Homburg =

Australian politician

Hermann Robert Homburg
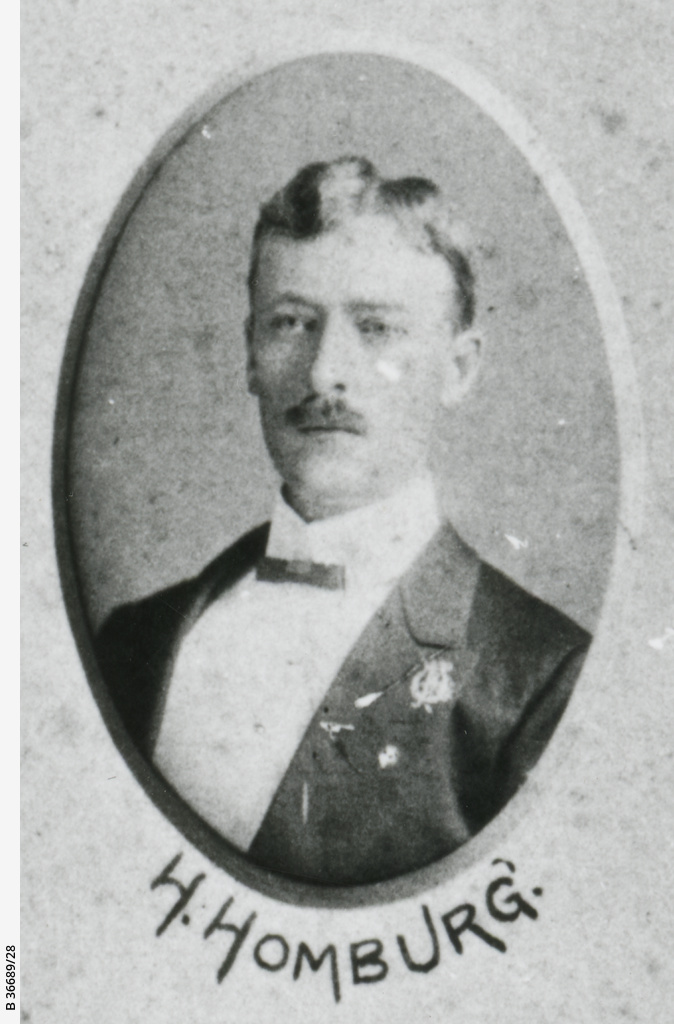
- Hermann Homburg as a member of the Adelaide Liedertafel in 1904

Attorney-General of South Australia
- In office 22 December 1909 – 3 June 1910
- Premier: Archibald Peake
- Preceded by: Samuel James Mitchell
- Succeeded by: Bill Denny
- In office 17 February 1912 – 21 January 1915
- Premier: Archibald Peake
- Preceded by: Bill Denny
- Succeeded by: Angas Parsons
- In office 8 April 1927 – 17 April 1930
- Premier: R. L. Butler
- Preceded by: Bill Denny
- Succeeded by: Bill Denny

Minister for Industry
- In office 17 February 1912 – 21 January 1915
- Premier: Archibald Peake
- In office 8 April 1927 – 17 April 1930
- Premier: R. L. Butler

Member of the South Australian Legislative Council for Central District No. 2
- In office 1933 – 1941
- Preceded by: John Herbert Cooke
- Succeeded by: Ernest Anthoney

Member of the South Australian Legislative Assembly for Murray
- In office 26 March 1927 – 5 April 1930
- Preceded by: Frank Staniford, Harry Young
- Succeeded by: Robert Hunter, Frank Staniford
- Parliamentary group: Liberal Federation
- In office 3 November 1906 – 27 March 1915
- Preceded by: Walter Duncan
- Succeeded by: George Dunn
- Parliamentary group: National League (1906–1910); Liberal Union (1910–1915)

Personal details
- Born: 17 March 1874 Norwood, South Australia
- Died: 12 December 1964 (aged 90) Dulwich, South Australia
- Resting place: Centennial Park Cemetery
- Party: Liberal and Democratic Union, Liberal Union, Liberal Federation
- Spouse: Emma Lydia Louisa Herring (m. 1897)
- Parent: Robert Homburg (father)
- Relatives: Robert Homburg Jr. (brother)
- Occupation: politician and lawyer

Hermann Robert Homburg (17 March 1874 – 12 December 1964) was a South Australian politician and lawyer.

== Early life ==
Homburg was born in Norwood and educated at Prince Alfred College and the University of Adelaide. Following his admission to the bar in 1897, he practised law at his father's legal firm, Homburg & Melrose. Homburg's German-born father, Robert Homburg, was also a prominent South Australian politician and lawyer. Robert Homburg had served as Attorney-General of South Australia on three separate occasions, and also, later, as a justice of the Supreme Court of South Australia, the first non-British migrant to be appointed to such a position in Australia.

Homburg supported participation in sport more than watching it. He was member and captain of the Glen Osmond Cricket Club and chairman of the North Adelaide Cycling Club.

== Before World War I ==
Representing his father's former electorate, Hermann Homburg served as a non-Labor Party member for Murray in the House of Assembly from 1906 to 1915. He became Attorney-General under Premier Archibald Peake in 1909 and also Minister for Industry from 1912 to 1915.

The outbreak of World War I in 1914 resulted in widespread distrust and persecution of German-Australians. In 1914, while he was Attorney-General, Homburg's government office in Adelaide was raided by soldiers with fixed bayonets. He soon fell victim to anti-German sentiment and resigned in early 1915 to avoid embarrassing the government in the forthcoming election. Homburg wrote of a "campaign of lies and calumnies against me... because I am not of British lineage."

== Between the wars ==
In 1927, Homburg successfully contested Murray again and returned to parliament. He served as Attorney-General and Minister for Industry in the R. L. Butler ministry from 1927 until losing his seat in 1930. From 1933 to 1941 he was a member of the Legislative Council. He was also a leader of Adelaide's secular German community during the interwar period.

Despite his many years of public service, Homburg's loyalties were once again questioned following the advent of World War II. His home and private office were searched and he was interned on 25 November 1940 but released after appeal on 21 December, under open conditional arrest, one condition being that he moved interstate. In January 1941 he relocated to Melbourne and then moved to Ballarat whereupon he retired from parliament. The judges at Homburg's appeal concluded, "it is obvious that one or more of the persons reporting may have a grudge against the objector Homburg and under pledge of secrecy be willing to lie to cause him distress and trouble."

== After politics ==
Homburg returned to Adelaide in 1942 and continued to practice as a solicitor until his death in 1964. He wrote about his experiences during both wars in South Australian Lutherans and War-Time Rumours (1947).

== Bibliography ==
- Homburg, Hermann (1947), South Australian Lutherans and wartime rumours, Adelaide: [s.n.]

Political offices
Preceded by Samuel Mitchell	Attorney-General of South Australia; 1909-1910	Succeeded by Bill Denny
Preceded by Bill Denny	Attorney-General of South Australia; 1912-1915	Succeeded by Herbert Angas Parsons
Preceded by Bill Denny	Attorney-General of South Australia; 1927-1930	Succeeded by Bill Denny
South Australian House of Assembly
Preceded by Walter Hughes Duncan	Member for Murray; 1906–1915	Succeeded by George Dunn
Preceded by Frank Staniford; Harry Young	Member for Murray; 1927–1930	Succeeded by Robert Hunter; Frank Staniford
South Australian Legislative Council
Preceded by John Herbert Cooke; George Henry Prosser	Member for Central District No. 2; 1933–1941	Succeeded by Ernest Anthoney
