= List of historic houses in South Australia =

This is an incomplete list of historic houses in South Australia.

== Historic houses ==
Image	Name	Built	For	#	Street	Suburb/town	Local govt. area	Fate	Notes
	The Acacias	1877	Dr J. M. Gunson	316	Portrush Road	Marryatville	N P & S	Loreto College	1878–1919 Sir Edwin Smith; 1919 Loreto Convent
	Ackland House	1901	William Ackland	631	South Road	Everard Park	Unley	Retirement village	
	Adare	1837	John Hindmarsh jr.		Adare Avenue	McCracken	Victor Harbor	Uniting Church conference centre	Across R. Hindmarsh from Mount Breckan; orig. a cottage "Mootaparinga", 1891 D. H. Cudmore built current edifice 1941; 1954 Uniting Church
	Airlie	~1870		9	Trinity Street	College Park	N P & S		C. H. Spence? Edward Kay; Gavin Gardner
	The Almonds	1851	William Belt			Walkerville	Walkerville	Private home National Trust of SA listed	1851 Belt family (93 years); 1944 ? 1969 Brown family
	Alton	1848	David Wark		St Bernards Road	Magill	Campbelltown	demolished 1936	1872 Daniel Chappell c. 1880 J. Crane c. 1888 Robert Burden c. 1900 E. W. Krichauff
	Alvington	1880?	William Bickford jr.	cnr	Bickford Terrace and The Esplanade	Somerton Park	Holdfast	Demolished 1976	1938–1976 "Somerton Home" for the Crippled Children's Association
	Arowie House	1874	James Alexander Holden		Holden Street	Kensington Park	Burnside	Pembroke School, renamed as Angove House	1887 John Charles Marshall Taylor; 1917 Mark Edward Ridgeway; 1926 Girton Girls' School, now Pembroke School
	Arthur's Seat	~1875	George Tinline, completed by Gavin Young		Summit Road	Crafers	Adel. Hills	destroyed by fire 1983	1908 H. Teesdale Smith; 1925 Arthur H. Poole; 1927 Stawell School; 1942 A.W.A.S. 1943 Mrs. Basil Harford
	Ashford House	1838	Dr C. G. Everard	87	Anzac Highway	Ashford	W. Torrens	Ashford Special School	
	Aston			20	Edwin Terrace	Gilberton	Walkerville		
	Athelney	1858	P. D. Prankerd		Hackney Road	Hackney	N P & S	St Peter's College	1864: H. B. Hughes and Laura Hughes; 1917: E. B. Hughes
	Attunga	1900	Benjamin Burford	120	Kensington Road	Toorak Gardens	Burnside	Burnside War Memorial Hospital	
	Auchendarroch House	1878	Robert Barr Smith	17	Adelaide Road	Mount Barker	Mt Barker	Wallis Cinemas, tavern & function centre	Built 1860 as Lachlan MacFarlane's Oakfield Hotel; 1922: Methodist Rest and Convalescent Home.
	Ayers House	1855	Sir Henry Ayers	288	North Terrace	Adelaide	Adelaide	National Trust	Originally named Austral House Restored and open for public use in 1970 by Premier Don Dunstan.
	Balmoral	1839	Joseph Ind		Lower North East Road	Dernancourt	Camp'twn	Retirement village	
	Barton Vale House	1852	Edmund Bowman	20	Walker Court (off Main North Road)	Enfield	PAE	Restored, and used by P. & M. Smith diverse businesses	1852 Bowman family 1922 "Home for Wayward Girls"; 1947 Remand centre 1980s Restored (Govt. offices); 1991 Sold and subdivided 1995 Smith family
	Beaumont House	1849	Bishop Augustus Short	631	Glynburn Road	Beaumont	Burnside	National Trust	Originally named "Claremont"
	Benacre	1875	William Bickford sr.	6	Benacre Place	Glen Osmond	Burnside	Private home	T. B. Strangways; Henry Scott; Thomas Graves; 1906 John Lewis; 1924 Lance Lewis; Listed on the Register of the National Estate.
	Birksgate	1851	Arthur Hardy; Thomas Elder			Mira Monte / Urrbrae	Mitcham	Demolished	T. E. Barr Smith 1897–
	Willa Willa; Birralee, Belair	1897; 1920	T. Hamilton; William Burford	49	Sheoak Road	Belair	Mitcham	Private home	1897 Hamilton; 1917 Estate sub-divided ~1919 Burford Family; 1942 Scotch College; 1944 TB Sanatorium; 1952 Repatriation Hospital; 1976 St Anthony's; 2000s Private home
	Birralee, Glenelg		William Burford	16	Albert Tce (cnr Seawall)	Glenelg	Holdfast	Demolished	
	Bishop's Court	1865	Bishop Augustus Short	41-50	Palmer Place	North Adelaide	Adelaide	Still in use, but	
	The Briars	1856	George Hawker	15	Briar Avenue	Medindie	Walkerville	1914 McBride Hospital	spelled "Briers" pre-1870
	The Brocas	~1843	John Newman		Woodville Road	Woodville	Chas. Sturt		Rebuilt 1870
	Brookside	1841	Captain Scott	37	Shakespeare Avenue	Tranmere	Camp'twn	Demolished ~1960	
	Byethorne		William Milne jun. George Milne from 1915	26	Ayers Hill Rd	Stirling	Adel. Hills	1947 St Catherine's convent private owner	not "Bythorne"
	Carclew	1897	Hugh Robert Dixson	11-19	Jeffcott Street, Montefiore Hill	North Adelaide	Adelaide	Carclew Youth Arts Centre	Chambers' family home, demolished 1897. 1897 Dixson built "Stalheim". 1908 Langdon Bonython renamed it "Carclew".
	Carminow	1885	Sir Thomas Elder		Mount Lofty Summit Road	Crafers	Adel. Hills	Destroyed during Ash Wednesday bushfire in 1983 but has since been rebuilt	1885 Elder; ~1905 Langdon Bonython
	Carrick Hill	1939	Sir Edward Hayward	46	Fullarton Road	Springfield	Mitcham	Museum	
	The Cedars	1870s			Heysen Road	Hahndorf	Mount Barker	Museum	Purchased by Hans Heysen in 1912
	Claremont see Hartley Bank					Glen Osmond	Burnside		
	Clifton Manor	1852	George Deane Sismey	16	Waratah Way	Stonyfell	Burnside	Private home	
	Cobham Hall	~1840	Dr Joseph Bell	4	Gordon Street	Morphettville	Marion	Cobham Retirement Homes	
	Collingrove	1856	John Howard Angas		Eden Valley Road	Angaston	Barossa	National Trust	
	Coreega	1883	Frank Makin		Fullarton Road now Carrick Hill Rd.	Springfield	Mitcham		George Riddock 1888; Joseph Florey 1906; Alfred Stump c. 1920
	Cosford	~1840	John Hawkins	10	Montacute Road	Hectorville	Camp'twn	Private home	Gunton has R. D. Hawkins
	Craigbuie	1887	Johann Schmidt			Leabrook	Burnside	Private home	Orig. owner Alfred Watts; Orig. The Wattles aka Edelweiss
	Craigmellon			3	Edwin Terrace	Gilberton	Walkerville	Private home	George Brookman c.1880-1920
	Cummins House	1842	Sir John Morphett		Sheoak Avenue	Novar Gardens	W. Torrens	Museum and Function centre	
	Darroch House	1885	James Waddell Marshall	6	Briar Road	Felixstow	N P & S	Bowen Funerals	
	Delamere	1847	William Bartley		Delamere Avenue	Springfield	Mitcham	Demolished ~1950	
	Dickson House	1950	Robert Dickson	1	Wandilla Drive	Rostrevor	Camp'twn	Private home	
	Dover House	~1848	William Wheewall			Kensington Gardens	Burnside	Private home	
	Dunluce Castle	1912	Alexander Macully		Yester Avenue	Brighton	Holdfast	Private home	
	Eden Park	1898	Thomas Roger Scarfe	1A	The Crescent	Marryatville	N P & S		Marryatville High School Year 12 Centre
	Eothen; St Corantyn	1891	C. A. Hornabrook		East Terrace	Adelaide	Adelaide		Lavington Bonython 1928
	Erindale	1871	E. M. de Mole		Burnside Road	Erindale	Burnside	Demolished	de Mole greatly extended 1850 house
	Eringa		Sidney Kidman	76	Northgate Street	Unley Park	Unley		
	Essenside	1873	Edward M. Bagot	cnr	Moseley and College Streets	Glenelg	Holdfast	Demolished 1972	
	Estcourt House	1881-3	F. Estcourt Bucknall		Military Road	Tennyson	Chas. Sturt		F. E. Bucknall; AMP Society; James Brown Memorial Trust 1893–
	Eurilla	1884	William Milne		Mount Lofty Summit Road	Crafers	Adel. Hills	Private home	1884 William Milne; 1917 Lavington Bonython; 1972 Kym Bonython; 1987 ? 1998 J&C Ganzis
	Eynesbury House	1880	George Wilcox	69	Belair Road	Kingswood	Mitcham	Private home	
	Federation House		Sir Richard Chaffey Baker	32	Brougham Place	North Adelaide	Adelaide	Student facilities, Lincoln College	Uniting Church
	Fernilee			569	Greenhill Road	Burnside	Burnside	Demolished for housing development	James Gartrell
	Forest Lodge	1892	John Bagot	19	Pine Street	Stirling	Adel. Hills	Private residence	For many years summer home of Bagot family
	Forsyth House; Kahurangi; Aldersgate	1913	A. E. Pitt	160	OG Road	Felixstow	N P & S	Aldersgate Nursing Home	
	Glanville Hall	1856	John Hart	8	Park Ave	Glanville	PAE	Commercial function centre	ca.1930 J. Anderson
	Glenara	~1865	William Hill		Esplanade	Glenelg	Holdfast		
	Glynde House		E. C. Gwynne		Avenue Road	Payneham	N P & S	Private residence	Gwynne extended 1838 cottage
	Grange	1840	Capt. Charles Sturt		Jetty Street	Grange	Chas. Sturt	Charles Sturt Museum	R. F. Newland lived here for some years
	The Grove	1872	John Acraman		View Road and North East Road	Walkerville	Walkerville	College Grove Rehabilitation Hospital	Destroyed by fire in October 1876
	Hartley Bank	1842	Alfred Hardy			Glen Osmond	Burnside	Private home	1862: Renamed Claremont by Daniel Cudmore
	Hazelwood Cottage	1848	Alexander Lang Elder	32	Howard Terrace	Hazelwood Park	Burnside	Private home	
	Heathpool	1840	George Reed	16	Hanson Avenue	Heathpool	Burnside	Private home	
	Helenholm	1853	William Finlayson	1	Finlayson Street	Netherby	Mitcham	Private home	Enlarged 1915 by W. A. Norman
	Heywood	~1855	Thomas Whistler (perhaps)	6	Addiscombe Place	Unley Park	Unley	Private home	Owned by Haslam family for numerous years
	Highfield	1849	Edward Drew		Portrush Road	Glen Osmond	Burnside	Business premises	
	Ilfracombe	1840	Dr James Nash			Burnside	Burnside	Demolished	Owned by "Stonyfell" Martin family for 90 years
	Ivanhoe			9	Edwin Terrace	Gilberton	Walkerville	Private home	
	Jordon House	~1860	William Gerrard		Daws Road	Edwardstown	Marion	Demolished	Orig. cottage developed by Gerrard
	Kadlunga	1857	James Stein		Kadlunga Road	Mintaro	Clare Valley	Private homestead	James Stein 1857 to 1877; John Chewings 1877 to 1881; Samuel Way 1881 to 1916; Melrose/Gosse family 1916 to 2017; Tim Edmunds 2017 to
	Kalymna; Adelaide Miethke House; Oreon House	1874	C. A. Hornabrook	28	Dequetteville Tce	Kent Town	N P & S	Offices	Thomas Graves; H. H. Dutton 1924–26; E. W. Holden 1926–40; Nancy Buttfield; 1949 Education Dept. Oreo Partners
	Kandahar	1906	William Henry Morish	329	Marion Road	North Plympton	W. Torrens	Community centre	Named in honour of "Earl Roberts of Kandahar"
	Kingsmead	1865	Charles Jacob	75–78	Brougham Place	North Adelaide	Adelaide	Private home	
	Kingston House	1840	George Strickland Kingston	48	Kingston Crescent	Kingston Park	Holdfast	Function venue	Marino Hotel and Boarding House until 1843.
	Kolendo	~1880s	Charles Rischbieth	5	Farrell Street	Glenelg	Holdfast	Glenelg Community Hospital	
	Kurralta	1844	William Wyatt		Kurralta Drive	Burnside	Burnside	Private home	Architect:George Kingston
	Landunna		John Rounsevell	111	Hutt Street	Adelaide	Adelaide	Naval, Military & Airforce Club	"the building still occupies an entire unsubdivided Town Acre"
	The Laurels	1857	John Dunn	2	Hutchinson Street	Mount Barker	Mt Barker	Centre of "The Laurels" Retirement Village	
	Linden	~1850	Alexander Hay			Beaumont	Burnside	Demolished 1967	Hay also commissioned "Mount Breckan".
	Lochend	1842	Charles Campbell	cnr	Hill and Hart Streets	Campbelltown	Camp'twn	restored	Open to the public on the first Sunday of every odd month 2-4 pm
	Manse	1882	North Adelaide Baptist Church	142	Tynte Street	North Adelaide	Adelaide	Restaurant	Property gifted to the National Trust of South Australia in 2021.
	Marble Hill	1880	Governor of South Australia			Marble Hill	Adel. Hills	Destroyed by bushfire 1955	2009 sold by SA government to private individuals who are funding restoration
	Martindale Hall	1879	Edmund Bowman, jr.		Min Man Road	Mintaro	Clare Valley	Museum	Edmund Bowman 1879 to 1892; Mortlock families 1892 to 1979; University of Adelaide 1979 to 1986; Government of South Australia 1986 to
	Marybank	1842	Thomas Shepherd		Montacute Road	Rostrevor	Camp'twn	Private home	home of Fox family over 130 years
	Monalta aka Hope Lodge, Cherington	~1870	R. B. Andrews Q.C.	13	Laffers Road	Belair	Mitcham	Blackwood District Community Hospital	Other owners include: A. G. Downer; H. O. Hannaford; Wykeham School; F. J. Blades
	Monklands			52	Church Terrace	Walkerville	Walkerville		
	Montefiore		Sir Samuel Way		Palmer Place	North Adelaide	Adelaide	Aquinas College	Way 1872–1916; Harold Fisher
	Morialta	1847	John Baker		Morialta Lane	Norton Summit	Adel. Hills	Youth with a Mission	Morialta Protestant Children's Home 1924 to 1974
	Mount Breckan	1881	Alexander Hay	21-25	Renown Avenue	Victor Harbor	Victor Harbor	Private home and Function centre	Hay also commissioned "Linden".
	Mount Laura	1922			Ekblom Street	Whyalla Norrie	Whyalla	National Trust	
	Mount Lofty House	1858	Arthur Hardy	74	Mount Lofty Summit Road	Crafers	Adel. Hills	Function venue	Other owners included: Alfred Watts; Frank Stokes; Arthur Waterhouse; J. W. Richardson Destroyed during Ash Wednesday 1983 and reopened after restoration in 1986.
	Murray Park	1884	Alexander Borthwick Murray	14-38	St Bernards Road	Magill	Campbelltown	UniSA Magill Campus	Now known as 'Murray House'.
	Nesfield	1880	Edward Davies	353	Marion Road	North Plympton	W. Torrens	Private home	
	Nurney House	1849	Charles Bagot	Cnrs	Kingston Terrace, Jerningham Street and Stanley Street	North Adelaide	Adelaide	Private home	
	Old Government House	1860	Governor of South Australia		Belair National Park	Belair	Mitcham	Museum	
	Olivewood	1889	Charles F. Chaffey	Cnr	Renmark Avenue and 21st Street	Renmark	Renmark	National Trust	
	Paringa Hall	1882	James Cudmore	195-235	Brighton Road	Somerton Park	Holdfast	Sacred Heart College (Adelaide)	Designed by Edmund William Wright; 1882 Cudmore family residence 1897 Sacred Heart College
	The Pines		John Martin		Marion Road	North Plympton	W. Torrens	Southern Cross Homes	
	Pomona	1881	William Rendall Cave		Pomona Road?	Crafers	Adel. Hills	Private home	
	Prospect House	1846	John Benjamin Graham		Braund Road	Prospect	Prospect	demolished 1901	known locally as "Graham's Castle" c. 1880 W. H. Clark
	Prospect Lodge	~1850	George Fife Angas		Torrens Road	Bowden	Charles Sturt	demolished	c. 1860 John Howard Angas's home while parliament sitting
	Rhyllon	1870s	William Wadham		Robe terrace	Medindie	Walkerville		
	Romalo House (orig. Home Park then La Perouse)		W. P. Auld	24	Romalo Ave	Magill	Campbelltown	Private home	1858 Elizabeth Longbottom; Frank Young; 1909 Edmond Mazure; 1945 Warren Bonython; 2014 New owners
	The Rosary	1870s	Benjamin Babbage		Donald Street	St Marys	Mitcham	Demolished 1930s	Locally referred to as Babbage's Castle
	Rostrevor	1870s	Ross T. Reid		Glen Stuart Rd.	Woodforde	Adel. Hills	Rostrevor College	J. S. Reid (no relation) 1887–1913
	Stangate House	1937	Rev. S. Raymond Cornish	3	Edgeware Road	Aldgate	Adel. Hills	National Trust SA	Garden maintained by Camellia Society Adelaide Hills (Inc.)
	Struan House	1873	John Robertson		Riddoch Highway	Naracoorte	Naracoorte Lucindale Council	SARDI agriculture research centre	
	Swanscombe	1873	John Walker		Fuller Street	Walkerville	Walkerville	Private home	1856 C. B. Young; 1928 C. V. T. Wells; J. Slatter
	Tenterden House		Captain Henry Simpson		Woodville Road	Woodville Gardens	Woodville	Demolished 1996	
	Torrens Park	1853	Barr Smith family	cnr	Carruth and Blythewood Roads	Torrens Park	Mitcham	Scotch College, Adelaide	Robert Torrens; 1865 W. W. Hughes; 1874 R. Barr Smith
	Tranmere House	1898	George Hunt	3	Kings Grove	Tranmere	Camp'twn	Private home	State Heritage Listed
	Tregenna	1899-1900	William Frederick Stock	85	North East Road	Collinswood	Prospect	Demolished ~1970	Advertised in 1917, but remained within extended family; sold to ABC in 1957 for TV service for SA, replaced by 8-storey brutalist building.
	Tremere ("place by the sea")	~1850	Richard Colley		Anzac Highway	Glenelg	Holdfast	Demolished ~1950	Original Glenelg Town Hall; Richard Colley; William Rounsevell; W. B. Rounsevell; Emmett & Sons Ltd.
	Undelcarra	1850; 1876	George Debney; Simpson Newland		Undelcarra Road	Burnside	Burnside	Private home	1850 Debney; 1876 Newland; 1911 H. Torrens Ward; 1919 Simpson family
	Urrbrae House	1891	Peter Waite		Claremont Avenue	Urrbrae	Mitcham	University of Adelaide	
	Wairoa	1888	William Austin Horn	160	Mount Barker Road	Aldgate	Adel. Hills	Private home	1971-2004 Marbury School
	Warrakilla	1841	William Warland		Strathalbyn Road	Mylor	Adel. Hills	Private home	Orig. Wheatsheaf Inn; 1879 George Goyder
	Waverley (orig. "Waverly")	1862	William Sanders	356–364	South Terrace	Adelaide	Adelaide	St Andrews private hospital	1873 T. R. Bowman; 1915 H. C. Cave; 1946 Legacy Club
	Weetunga	1878	Samuel White	12-14	Weetunga St	Fulham	W. Torrens	Private home	
	Whitehead	1907	A. G. Rymill	39	Brougham Place	North Adelaide	Adelaide	Principal's residence, Lincoln College	A. C. Rymill; Uniting Church
	Willyama ( = "Broken Hill area")	1876	Dr Oscar Gorger	12	The Avenue	Medindie	Walkerville	Private home	1886 Charles Rasp; 1936 Hew O'H Giles; 1987
	Wolta Wolta	1846	John Hope		Neagles Rock Road	Clare	Clare	B&B	Destroyed in 1983 Ash Wednesday Bushfires and rebuilt in 2007
	Woodforde House	1856	William Uren	10	Melory Crescent	Magill	Camp'twn	Private house	Despite being State Heritage-listed, on market after "unauthorised development" in 2026
	Woodhouse		Richard Davies Hanson		Spring Gully Road	Piccadilly	Adel. Hills	Scouts Australia (SA Branch)	
	Wooton Lea / Wootton Lea		F. H. Faulding		Portrush Rd	Glen Osmond	Burnside	Seymour College	F. H. Faulding; J. H. Symon; 1873 G. S. Fowler; Presbyterian Girls' College
	Yallum Park	1878-1880	John Riddoch		Millicent Road	Penola	Wattle Range	Privately owned house museum	

== See also ==
- National Trust of South Australia
- List of National Trust properties in Australia § South Australia
- List of Nationally Significant 20th-Century Architecture in South Australia
- List of historic homesteads in Australia § South Australia
