= William Mortlock =

William Mortlock may refer to:

- Will Mortlock (1832–1884), English professional cricketer — active 1851 to 1870
- William Ranson Mortlock (1821–1884), pioneer grazier and politician in colonial South Australia
- William Tennant Mortlock (1858–1913), grazier and politician in South Australia (grandson of William Ranson Mortlock)
