= Bowman brothers =

The Bowman brothers were pioneer pastoralists of Tasmania (then "Van Diemen's Land") and South Australia. They were the sons of John Bowman (1785 – 1 June 1857, born Askham, Westmorland): Edmund Bowman, John Bowman, William Charles Bowman and Thomas Richard Bowman.

== The brothers ==
=== Edmund Bowman ===
Edmund Bowman (1818 – 14 August 1866) was born in Askham, Westmorland, and emigrated to Hobart, Tasmania with his parents and siblings. He travelled to Adelaide on the Parsee in 1838 to investigate South Australia's potential for investment opportunity and returned on the Porter in 1839. He helped his father establish farms and residences at Dry Creek, Enfield and Crystal Brook. He died after falling from a log bridge at his property near Port Wakefield.

=== John Bowman, Jr. ===
John Bowman Jr. (1828 – 3 August 1900) was born in Cumberland, and accompanied his parents and siblings to Hobart. John and William Charles arrived in South Australia together as youngsters, accompanying their father's herd of sheep.

He was appointed Justice of the Peace in 1868 but otherwise took little part in public affairs. He acquired Poltalloch station near Tailem Bend; he and his brother William Charles, trading as Bowman Brothers, bought Cheshunt House on the Meander River 16 km above Deloraine, Tasmania.

John, hitherto a bachelor, at age 52 married William Charles's widow Jane and purchased a home, "Carolside" in New Town, Tasmania. Their son Keith Dudley was a prominent Adelaide businessman.

In 1886, he acquired land at Bethanga Flat Wodonga, Victoria which was taken over by his step-son Albert Edward (ca.1865 – 1938). He may be the John Bowman convicted of insulting a railway official at Wodonga in 1889, after his cane had been stolen and his hat knocked off by some "larrikins".

In 1889 he purchased the Toogong estate near Orange, New South Wales, which was taken over by his other step-son William Charles jun. (ca.1868–1947). In later years he shared his time between "Poltalloch", his adopted son's property in Gippsland and his summer residence "Carolside", where he died.

=== William Charles Bowman ===
William Charles Bowman (ca.1830 – 23 February 1879) was born at Cheshunt Park, Tasmania. He acquired Crystal Brook station, which consisted of all the land between the Broughton River and the sea, and incorporated the Napperby, Nelshaby and Broughton runs. When the squat was resumed (reappropriated) by the Government, he returned to Tasmania.

=== Thomas Richard Bowman ===
Thomas Richard Bowman (17 March 1835 – 17 February 1911) was born in Tasmania and moved to South Australia with his father and two sisters in June 1840. He worked at Crystal Brook from 1857 to 1874. He inherited "Campbell House" (later "Campbell Park"), a property on Lake Albert, where he raised sheep and cattle. He owned a three-masted schooner Ada and Clara, named for his daughters, and captained by H. C. F. Kruse. In his last years he made considerable donations to a large number of charitable institutions. He purchased a massive assemblage of photographs of early settlers from its author, Henry Jones, and presented it to the State Library. He died at his residence "Waverley" on South Terrace, Adelaide, after a fall down stairs.

== History ==
John Bowman sen. (1785 – 1 June 1857) was born at Askham, Westmorland, a son of Edmund Bowman and Ann née Wilkinson, and migrated to Australia with his wife Mary née Bowman (1797 – 15 April 1865) of Celleron and six children on Fame, a small privately chartered brig in 1828 with his family then consisting of two sons and four daughters. Their destination was Western Australia, but (according to an account of T. R. Bowman) the journey and conditions on the ship were so bad that on 31 March 1831 they disembarked in Van Diemens Land rather than carry on to Fremantle. John Bowman rented a small farm near Hobart where he grew sheep and wheat and later purchased 1,200 acres on the shores of the Big Lagoon (or Stokle's Lagoon), and a swampy area facetiously named "Lake Tiberias", where T. R. Bowman was born, then Woodlands Farm, on the Coal River. He purchased the Mount Vernon property in Tasmania.

In 1838, John sent his eldest son, the 20-year-old Edmund, to South Australia to investigate its possibilities. The ship on which he sailed, the Parsee, was wrecked on Troubridge Shoals on 17 November 1838 and he lost all his possessions. He worked for a while with a survey party at Encounter Bay, then returned to Tasmania. He came back to Adelaide in 1839 with a few sheep and horses, camping on a section at Islington (now known as Kilburn), and was followed by his father, who had decided to sell up and move to South Australia with the rest of the family except two daughters, who remained at school in Hobart. He brought a Tasmanian-made frame house and erected it at, or near, Islington. Edmund purchased one, or two, sections at Pine Forest in Barton Vale, now known as Enfield, and a thatched pine house, or pisé and brick house, was built there for the family, who moved there in 1839.

According to T. R. Bowman's reminiscences the two brothers John and William, aged 13 and 11, came over with a consignment of sheep (and a shepherd) in the Lady Emma, landing near Largs Bay. However, shipping records show the Lady Emma carrying John Bowman snr and sons Thomas Richard (4 years old) and William Charles from Launceston arriving in S.A. on 13 July 1839 and John jnr (then around 11 years old) and William (around 8 years) arriving in S.A. on 18 September 1839 aboard Glenswilly – it is difficult to reconcile these, even given the notorious unreliability of shipping manifests of the time, unless Thomas misremembered the ships' names and William had been sent back to help John jnr. Edmund (yet again) and his sisters Deborah and Jane arrived in S.A. aboard Porter on 8 December 1839. John's wife Mary and the two remaining daughters Elizabeth and Amelia Christiana arrived in SA on 13 June 1840 aboard Lady Emma accompanied by son John (again). There is no record of Mary jnr arriving, but one source does state that she died in SA in 1844.

Two of the daughters married and went to live at Willunga where much of the flock was transferred, with the rest run between Dry Creek and Beefacres on the River Torrens. They bought more sheep from John Kelsh (a friend who had also come out on the Fame), who had brought a flock from Tasmania in 1846, but grew discouraged by dog attacks, scab, and low prices. They grew wheat on land rented from E. M. Bagot, and were among the first to use the Ridley reaping machine. They took up several properties on the Wakefield River. They may also have been the first to grow Sturt's Desert Pea from seed.

John purchased Martindale Estate 3 km south of Mintaro from Drs. W. & J. Browne and it was managed by his son Edmund. After the death of Edmund senior in 1866, his cousin William Bowman (see below) managed the estate for the Trustees.

The brothers also bred horses, mainly supplying the British Army in India with remounts to replace those killed or injured in battle. They were also keen racehorse owners. Among their stock was the notable sire South Australian.

Edmund Bowman purchased Werocata estate, on the Lower Wakefield near Balaklava, sometime before 1864, which was taken over by his son Charles William. In 1886 the property was sold to the noted horse breeder Stephen S. Ralli who sold it 20 years later to George Septimus Robinson, father of parliamentarian Albert W. Robinson.

Edmund bought Wandillah near Kooringa from the estate on John and Alfred Hallett in 1878. The property was sold to the Ayers brothers and was managed by Edmund Bowman junior along with Holm Hill.

Edmund suffered from poor health and early abandoned outback work to maintain an office in Adelaide. In 1852 he built the mansion "Barton Vale" in Enfield with 5.5 m ceilings and over 2,000 square meters of floors. It still exists, at 20 Walker Court, near main North Road, and was restored during the 1990s "to its former grandeur". He died aged 43 after falling from a log bridge at his property at Port Wakefield.

Edmund's brothers Thomas, John and William worked for around 20 years on the Crystal Brook run of 500 square miles which they in 1856 bought from Younghusband & Co. It carried 25,000 sheep, 3,400 cattle, and 200 horses. They suffered terribly from the droughts of 1859, 1866 to 1869, and 1874 losing 15,000 sheep one year and 10,000 in another, all the time fighting against dogs and scab. Bushfires were a regular hazard. They built dams on the River Broughton, dug their own wells, cooked their own food and even sheared their own sheep when all the shearers had left for the gold diggings. Through perseverance and hard physical work their landholdings and size of their flocks increased steadily.

The Government resumed (took back) the northern pastoral areas for farming settlements, including the Bowman Brothers' property Napperby, which they had run as part of Crystal Brook, and now includes the hundred of Napperby, a small farming community, 8 km north-east of Port Pirie, after which the original homestead fell into decay.

In 1873 Thomas and John Bowman purchased the Poltalloch and Campbell House stations on Lake Albert, with their celebrated herds of "M7" shorthorn cattle, from Sir John Malcolm of Poltalloch, Argyleshire. They sold most of the cattle to Sir Thomas Elder to concentrate on sheep, and a year later severed their partnership: John took Poltalloch and Thomas took Campbell House. Keith D. Bowman inherited Poltalloch from his father; his brother Albert Edward had a property in Gippsland, Victoria. From 1859 Campbell House was managed by Peter Peterson both for John Malcolm and then the Bowmans. Mr Peterson had properties of his own at Bugle Ranges, South Australia and Paris Creek, South Australia, then in 1902 retired to his home "Parkindula" near Mount Barker, South Australia.

The brothers built a wool store and one of the first jetties in Port Pirie, both later taken over by the Government. They purchased three ships: one, the ketch Napperby, ran aground on shoals at Point Lowly near Whyalla on 5 November 1875 and was scrapped.

The famous mansion "Martindale Hall" was built on Martindale Estate for Edmund junior by R. Huckson and completed in 1880, and was home for both Edmund and his brother Charles William. (Martindale, Cumbria is about 10 km from Askham, the family's hometown before emigration.)

Then in 1890, after several years of droughts and low wool prices, Edmund put the Martindale homestead up for sale. In 1892, it was sold to William Tennant Mortlock, who also purchased a large portion of the stud sheep. Werocata, Wandillah and Mount Bryan stations were also relinquished.

== Family ==
John Bowman (senior) (1785 – 1 June 1857) married Mary Bowman (1797 – 15 April 1865) in 1817. His last years were an ordeal. In 1854 he wandered away from his home and fears were held for his safety. He was found seven days later, alive but confused and paralysed. He died three years later. There was no obituary in the newspapers. Their children included:

- Edmund (1818 – 14 August 1866) married Elizabeth Hackney (8 December 1829 – 14 March 1907) on 24 January 1854. Elizabeth married a second time to William Henry Brooks (1836 – 25 August 1922) on 31 August 1871

- Edmund jun. (9 April 1855 – 23 August 1921) married Annie Lewers Cowle (1862 – 25 January 1936) on 2 January 1884. Annie was daughter of Charles Tobin Cowle (1834–1906), manager for South Australia of ES&A Bank. He purchased Holm Hill at Mintaro, part of the Martindale estate and established a merino stud there, before having Martindale Hall built.

- E(dmund) Donat Bowman (1885 – 11 December 1926), took over Holm Hill from his father. He married Adelaide Mary Shannon ( – 12 November 1952) on 25 June 1918
- Vera Constance Bowman (10 September 1886 – 10 June 1959)
- Eunice Elizabeth Bowman (1888–1977)
- Patricia Margaret Bowman (26 July 1891 – 1970)
- Charles Sholto Bowman (1902–1966)
- Jocelyn Eleanor Bowman (1904–)

- Charles William (known as William) (7 February 1857 – 3 September 1928) married Elizabeth Georgina Bryant ( – 28 June 1941) in 1920, early managed Mount Bryan Station then home at Victor Harbor, bred merino sheep near Hammond, a town 30 km NE of Wilmington. Much of his sheepfarming business was conducted in partnership with Charles and Thomas Chewings as Bowman & Chewings.
- Clarissa Eveline (11 February 1861 – 24 June 1948)
- Alice Elizabeth (1862 – 22 April 1928) married Alexander "Alick" James Murray (ca.1850 – 18 April 1929) on 23 June 1891.
- Hubert "Bertie" Bowman (8 April 1863 – 29 June 1914) lived at "Barton Vale", was a prominent polo player, managed Hill River Station for J. H. Angas, and his own property at Penwortham. He inherited "Barton Vale", which on his death was broken up and sold. He married Sarah Rose ?? (ca.1870 – 10 March 1954)
- Jessie (29 August 1865 – 12 December 1924) was mentioned in uncle T. R. Bowman's will.

- Deborah (1820 – 14 November 1887) arrived in Adelaide on 8 December 1839. She married William Innis Forrester (1808 – 8 February 1866) on 3 February 1841

- Emma ( – ca.12 December 1915) married Royston Roberts ( – 19 September 1914) on 29 April 1868
- Jane (1846 – 22 January 1936) married Gilbert Ferguson on 6 April 1867
- John (27 February 1847 – 13 January 1900) married Anna Wilhelmine "Minnie" Klopper (27 March 1854 – 12 February 1925) on 18 March 1874.
- Elizabeth "Bessie" (1850–) married James Spicer (ca.1847 – 6 May 1922) on 9 May 1877
- William Gilbert Forrester (ca.1852 – 29 May 1924) worked extensively with T. R. Bowman; bought Minburra Station from him, married Caroline Louisa Klopper on 15 March 1876
- Julia Frances (23 May 1853 – 11 May 1936) never married
- Louisa Bowman Forrester (2 October 1854 – ) married Charles Thomas Day on 25 July 1883
- Edwin Thomas Forrester (28 February 1857 – ) married Fannie Louisa Bleechmore ( – 31 October 1941) on 20 July 1881
- Mary Forrester (5 February 1859 – )

- Jane (1822 – 8 November 1855) arrived in Adelaide on 8 December 1839, married Thomas Tapley jun. (4 June 1817 – 3 July 1862), son of the famous publican Thomas Tapley on 8 November 1843; they lived at Emu Springs, near Burra then "Barton Vale", Enfield. He cofounded Tapley & Hince, butchers of Kadina and Wallaroo, which in 1862 became Parnell & Bowman. Jane and Thomas had three children:

- Thomas Richard (1847 – 30 July 30, 1929)
- Jane (1849–1934)
- Hannah Bowman Tapley (ca.1852 – 10 December 1854)

- Mary Anne (1824 – 12 April 1844) died of consumption
- Elizabeth (1826 – 21 November 1853) arrived in SA on 13 June 1840 aboard Lady Emma, married James Wyld MacDonald/McDonald, of Roseneath, Walkerville, accountant for South Australian Mining Association, she died in Tasmania during a visit.
- John (1828 – 3 August 1900) married his sister-in-law Jane Martin Bowman (1836 – 28 May 1898) on 30 September 1880, died at "Carolside".

- Keith Dudley Bowman (13 April 1881 – 26 May 1932) born at "Carolside", married Margaret Hepburn Gale (16 September 1880 – 18 July 1952) on 16 April 1902, inherited Poltalloch Station, purchased Wellington Station, others in New South Wales and a summer residence at Robe. He invested in the five-storey Bowman Buildings at 65–73 King William Street, an early example of reinforced concrete in multi-storey architecture, and site of Bowman's Arcade. He was a director of Bennett & Fisher Ltd. Margaret was State President of the Girl Guide movement. Among their children were:

- Mary married J. Trafford Cowan on 6 October 1927
- Nancy Margaret married Norman Lane Jude (later Sir Norman Lane Jude MHR) on 6 August 1935.
- Daphne Bowman OAM was prominent in the Guide movement, serving for many years as Deputy State Commissioner for S.A., a flying instructor with the Women's Air Training Corps and co-owner with Emily Livingstone of the historic Glenbarr homestead at Strathalbyn.

- William Charles (ca.1830 – 23 February 1879) purchased Crystal Brook station. When his lease was resumed by Government, he returned to Tasmania. He married Jane Martin Brown (1836 – 28 May 1898 at Hobart); they had 15 children. Jane later married John Bowman of Poltalloch on 30 September 1880 and had one more child, Keith Dudley. Later notices spelled her name "Jean Martyn".

- John William Bowman (ca.1857 – 30 July 1930) Born at Crystal Brook, inherited Mount Vernon property. With his uncle John purchased "The Ridge", Rosedale in Gippsland in 1878. Married Margaret Sarah Blanche Simmons (ca.1861 – 9 October 1926) on 10 November 1880; among their 4 sons and 5 daughters were:

- Archie William Bowman ( – 8 January 1950) of Lakes Entrance
- Athol C. Bowman of Malvern, Victoria
- Eric Mervyn Bowman of Newry, Victoria
- Ethel Jean McLean Bowman
- (Dorothy) Madge Bowman married William Bourke on 28 October 1913
- Ruby May Donald Bowman

- Frederic (Frederick?) James Bowman married Gertrude Sarah Field (1861 – 8 April 1949) on 15 March 1883; home "Cheshunt" in Tasmania

- Donald William married Emma Isabel Horne on 23 June 1905
- Daphne Jean (Daphne Clarine?) married (cousin?) Harry Field on 29 February 1906
- Stephnie Jean
- Adrian McDonald Bowman

- Arthur Percy Bowman (ca.1860 – 9 July 1932) was born at Crystal Brook, grew up in Tasmania, inherited Mount Vernon station, sold it and took up property in Gippsland, which he sold in 1902. Purchased Poltalloch and Campbell House stations, near Tailem Bend, with uncle T. R. Bowman, on whose death he inherited Bowman House while K. D. Bowman inherited Poltalloch. He was a successful racehorse owner and breeder and was for 11 years on the Adelaide Racing Club committee. He married Anne Maude Mary "Annie" Johnson (ca.1862 – 24 March 1944) on 7 July 1881. Among their children were:

- Harold Bowman (ca.1880 – 7 September 1930) married Gertrude Adelaide Latham on 15 February 1913. They had a home at Tatiara. In 1903 he injured himself in what can only be interpreted as a fit of depression.
- Alan Edmund Bowman ( – 1955) married Gwladys Lilian "Paddy" Bell ( – 17 August 1907) on 22 November 1905. She died after falling from a horse. He married again, to Maude Hamilton Pile ( – 1967), daughter of racehorse trainer John Pile, on 29 October 1910, only a few months after he was engaged to Hilda Landseer of Milang. Their home was "Tatiara", Lake Albert, then Campbell House. Their son Alan Peter Bowman (1916 – 15 April 1944), a flying officer with the RAAF, was killed in war service.

- Emmeline Thirza Mary (1862–1934) married Edward Hurst Pearce (1858–1936) on 1 August 1883.
- Florence Ada (ca.1864 – 6 July 1891)
- Albert Edward (ca.1865 – 10 July 1938) married Margaret Matilda McFarlane ( – 9 January 1949) on 30 October 1889. When young he managed Poltalloch Station, then took over Bethanga Park, near Wodonga, of which much was resumed for the Hume Weir. He was closely associated with his half-brother Keith Dudley Bowman.
- William Charles Bowman (ca. 1868 – 22 September 1947) of "Melyra", Orange, New South Wales married Clara Mary Ann O'Hare on 24 April 1893, divorced 1911. They had four children.

- Thomas Richard Bowman (17 March 1835 – 17 February 1911) married Elizabeth Haigh Love ( – 12 November 1939) on 4 October 1893. She was for many years president of the National Council of Women in South Australia and instrumental in founding South Australia's first Country Women's Association branches. Among their children were:

- Ada May (31 January 1873 – 12 May 1944) married Hugo Charles Cave, of Second Valley on 19 October 1904, lived at "Waverley", South Terrace. Their daughter Mary (6 October 1915 – ) was a prominent socialite.
- Clara Eva married Cecil Thomas Bray (27 September 1874 – 19 October 1937) the eldest son of Sir John Bray and a noted polo player.

- Amelia Christiana (1838–1841) arrived in SA on 13 June 1840 aboard Lady Emma

== Cousins ==
=== William Bowman ===
William Bowman was a cousin of the Bowman brothers and with Thomas Bowman (below, possibly his brother) managed the brothers' Crystal Brook station.

- William Bowman (ca.1821 – 14 November 1911) was married to Elizabeth ( – 28 May 1893) and managed Martindale between 1868 and 1870. He owned the nearby Cairnbrook station at Mintaro.

- William Emerson (ca.August 1867 – 3 June 1870) died at Martindale
- Elizabeth Ann "Annie" Bowman ( – 31 December 1930) married N. M. L. (Norman MacDonald Lockhart) Eddington (ca.1850 – 28 May 1930) of Laura on 2 December 1890. He had a long career in banking.

- George (7 May 1895 – 2 October 1917) killed in action, France

- Deborah ( – 10 July 1895)
- Mary Jane Bowman ( – 20 January 1940) died at Rose Park

=== Thomas Bowman ===
Thomas Bowman was a cousin of the Bowman brothers, the fifth son of John snr's brother Edmund and Hannah Bowman of Askham, Westmorland. He migrated to Australia on the Champion of the Seas in October 1855, disembarked in Melbourne, Victoria and spent some time on the Victorian goldfields. With William Bowman (above) managed the Bowman brothers' Crystal Brook station, then Edmund Bowman's Wakefield station and finally purchased property of his own "View Bank" at Maitland, South Australia. His wife was the daughter of Jacob Hooper, who migrated from Cornwall on the Isabella Watson in 1846 and eventually settled at Mount Barker.

- Thomas Bowman (18 June 1829 – 9 June 1922) married Catherine Hooper (ca.1837 – 2 November 1924) of Black Springs on 28 July 1859 at Mintaro. Among their five sons and seven daughters were:

- Matilda 'Tilly' Bowman married Henry Charles Pitt on 3 August 1889, settled in Stansbury then Balhannah
- Thirza Otena married William Wearn James on 16 August 1883, settled in Balhannah
- Clara Lenora married Gustav Adolph Wurm in 1895 (Stansbury)
- Mildred Sabina married Frederick Thomas Lawrence Parkins (Maitland)
- Florence Amy married Frank Hedley Hobbs on 5 March 1902 and settled at Lochiel Park, Campbelltown
- Alfred Edmund Bowman (Stansbury) married Mary Phillips on 31 Mar 1897
- Foster Bowman married Emma Mary 'Dot' Smith in 1908 and settled in Maitland
- Harold Bowman (Ardrossan)

- Thomas Harold Bowman (10 January 1914 – 26 October 1942) killed at El Alamein.

- Ernest Oscar Bowman married Florence Ethelwyn Emily Foord on 19 Oct 1903
- Clarence Bell Bowman married Fanny Maud Sims in 1908 (Maitland)

=== Parker Bowman ===
Parker, a nephew of John Bowman sen., was also a pastoralist and agriculturist in the Colony of South Australia.:

- Parker Bowman (ca.1831 – 13 October 1911) was born in Penrith, Cumberland, sixth son of John snr's brother Edmund and Hannah Bowman of Askham, Westmorland, and migrated to South Australia on the Champion of the Seas in 1855. He married Mary Ann (1837 – 6 July 1923), eldest daughter of Richard Bowman of Forest Hill (probably the location of the present road of that name in Penrith, Cumberland), on 18 December 1856. They lived at Auburn and his brother's Napperby station on the Crystal Brook run before leasing the Parara station near Ardrossan with Edward Parnell in 1866. He was Ardrossan's first Justice of the Peace. In 1876 the estate was subdivided and he selected the Parara section. Parara was the site of a copper mine in which Bowman and Parnell had a large investment, but which failed to make a profit. William Bowman was a director of this company, but it is uncertain as to which William this refers. Parker Bowman's children included:

- Mary Evelyne "Eva" ( ) married William Henry Pavy (1858 – 28 November 1939) on 12 March 1881
- Emma Jane ( – 19 June 1899 in buggy accident) married Benjamin Saunders Pavy (1861 – 19 November 1942) in March 1888
- Ada Beatrice (ca.1874 – 26 June 1885) died of typhoid
- Mabel Priscilla Bowman ( – 15 October 1907)
- Mouncy (often Mouncey) Parker Bowman ( – 10 October 1907) married Sarah Edwards on 10 July 1906
- Herbert W. Bowman ( ) married Helen Margaret "Nellie" Wood on 16 October 1903
- Edmund Richard Bowman (ca.1871 – 19 August 1948)

=== Edmund Parnell ===
Edmund Parnell was born in Askham, Westmoreland. His mother was Elizabeth Bowman, a younger sister of Mary Bowman (wife of John Bowman senior). He arrived in Melbourne, Australia in 1854 and then moved to South Australia. He settled in Kadina, was a cousin of the Bowman brothers and with Stephen Bowman founded the firm Parnell & Bowman which took over the butcher's business of Tapley & Hince in 1862.

- Edmund Parnell (9 March 1834 – 28 June 1887) married (1) Rachael Matilda McAlwey (ca.1836 – 2 July 1877) at Mintaro 11 February 1857 (2) Annie Rennison Roe (7 November 1844 – 14 June 1913) on 24 April 1878. Their children included:

- Edmund (1857 ) married Margaret Catherine "Maggie" Ritson (ca.1860 8 July 1917) on 23 September 1884
- John Bowman ( ) married Edith S. Haddy on 6 May 1896
- Parker Roe married Gertrude Clarissa "Clarice" Davies on 13 April 1905
- (Joseph) Douglas (ca.1882 – 12 April 1910)
- Elizabeth married Joseph Turner of Snowtown on 28 April 1886
- Mary "Polly" ( ) married Harry H. Rice (ca.1863 – 16 December 1919) on 12 March 1888
- Deborah "Deb" ( – 16 October 1925) married Thomas Flint (ca.1866 – 12 May 1934) on 9 April 1890
- Edith Theresa ( – 22 September 1919) married Arthur Herbert Thomas (ca.1872 – 30 October 1942) on 14 March 1894

=== Stephen Bowman ===
Stephen Bowman was registered as born in Barton, Westmorland, 5 km north-west of Askham, but since Celleron falls within that parish, he might have been born there. He was probably therefore a nephew of matriarch Mary née Bowman of Celleron, but in any case is noted as a cousin of the Bowman brothers. He established a butchery with Edmund Parnell (ca.1834 – 28 June 1887) in Kadina in 1863 and later Wallaroo. The firm of Parnell & Bowman became one of the largest on Yorke Peninsula.

- Stephen Bowman (10 March 1839 – 3 March 1902) married Margaret Morris (ca.1846 – 27 June 1939) on 8 November 1864.

- Thomas Henry (ca.1865 – 16 January 1932) butcher of Wallaroo married Louisa Emmeline Watts
- Edmund (ca.1867 – 28 September 1938) butcher of Kadina married Jessie Harris on 22 June 1892
- Florence Isabella ( – March 1835) married Thomas Davies (– 8 February 1938) on 16 November 1892
- Lillian married John Arthur Bowman ( – 17 March 1948)

== See also ==
- Chambers brothers (pastoralists)
- Robertson brothers (pastoralists)
