= John Andrew Tennant Mortlock =

Australian pastoralist (1894–1950)

John Andrew Tennant Mortlock in 1936.

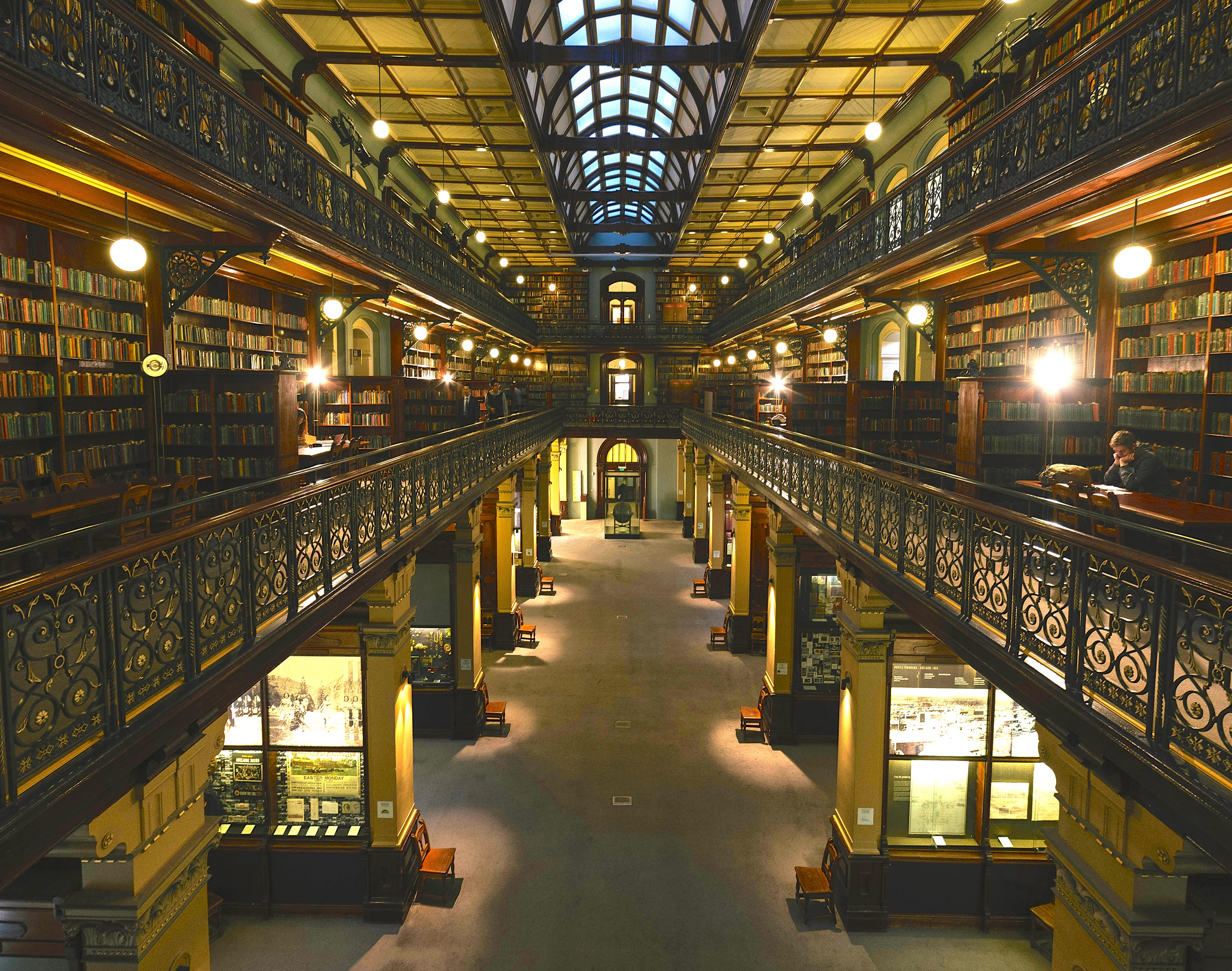
The Mortlock Wing of the State Library of South Australia.

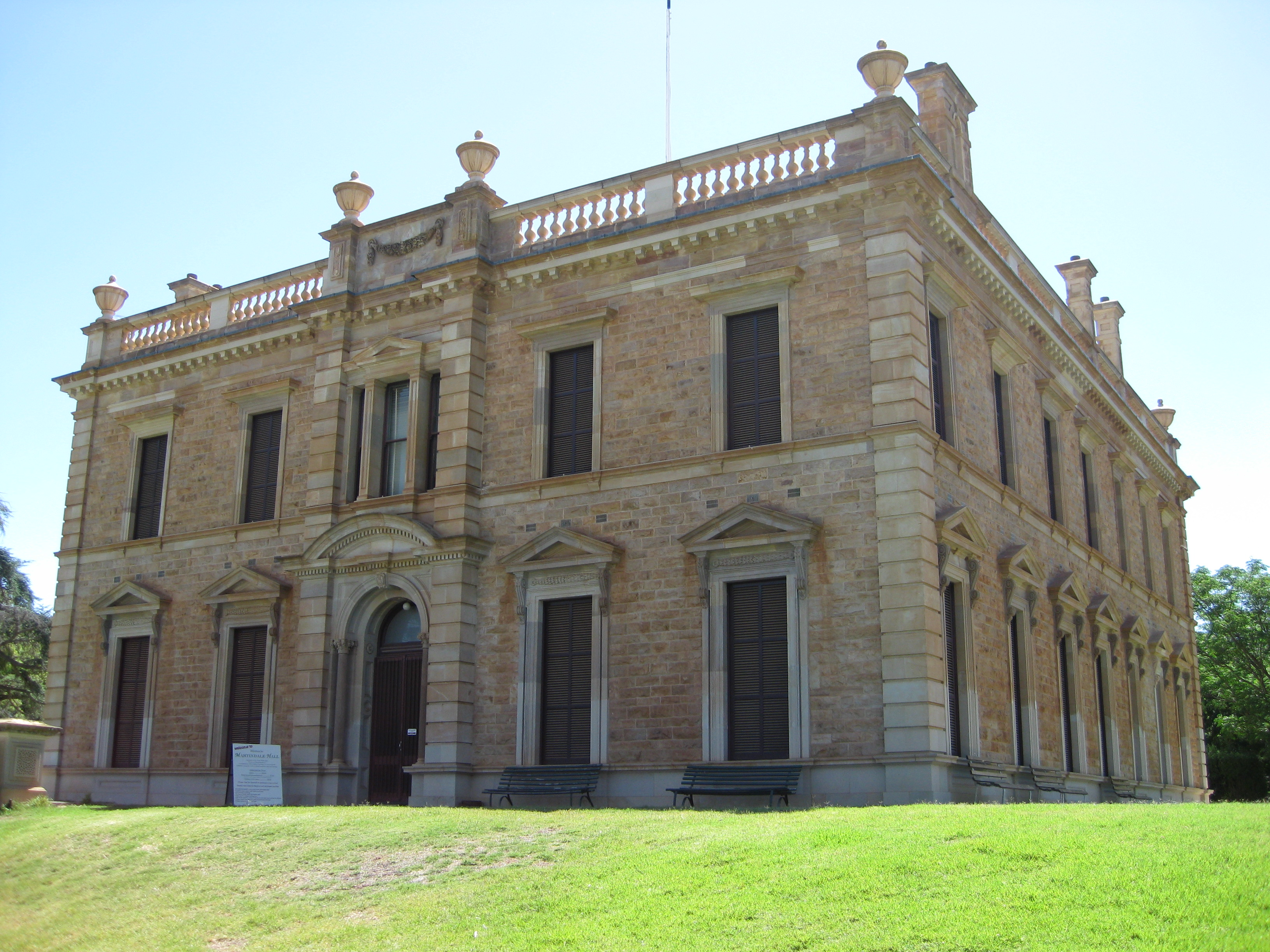
Martindale Hall.

Dorothy and John Mortlock, possibly at the time of their marriage in 1948.

John Andrew Tennant Mortlock (30 March 1894 – 15 March 1950) was a pastoralist in South Australia, remembered as a major benefactor of the State Library of South Australia and commemorated by the "Mortlock Wing" of the library.

== History ==
Mortlock was born at Mintaro, South Australia, the second son of pastoralist William Tennant Mortlock (1858 – 17 August 1913) and his wife Rosina Forsyth "Rosye" Mortlock, née Tennant (1865 – 12 August 1939).

He was educated at F. I. Caterer's Glenelg Grammar School then followed his father as a student at St. Peter's College and Jesus College, Cambridge. In 1913, on receiving news of his father's death, he left without graduating and took charge of the family properties, which included Martindale Estate and Martindale Hall, as well as cattle and sheep stations and other properties in Western Australia, South Australia and Victoria.

He was a successful stud Merino sheep breeder.

He was chairman of Yudnapinna Pastoral Company Pty. Ltd. and Yalluna Pty. Ltd., pastoral management companies.

=== Last years ===
On 7 December 1948 when Mortlock was mortally ill, suffering from cancer, he married Dorothy Elizabeth Beech (5 October 1906 – 10 August 1979). She had been secretary to Ernest E. E. Scarfe (1889–1947), Mortlock's finance manager. He appointed her executor of his estate.

He died at a private hospital in Adelaide. His remains were buried in the North Road Cemetery.

His South Australian estate alone was sworn for probate at £1,148,124. His widow Dorothy Mortlock became involved with the State Library of South Australia as a member of the management committee and of the "Friends of the SLSA" and gave generously to a number of charities.

== Other interests ==
Tennant was a member of the Adelaide Club.

He raced greyhounds and owned racehorses.

He was a keen yachtsman, owner of motor yacht Martindale.

He was an amateur film-maker.

He had a home in Avenue road, Millswood, where he cultivated orchids.

He was a regular worshipper at the St. Peter's Anglican Church, Mintaro.

He was an enthusiast for fine wine, to his detriment.

== Benefaction ==
In 1926 Mortlock donated £2,000 to the Waite Agricultural Research Institute, now part of the University of Adelaide. In 1936 he and his mother gave a further £25,000 to establish the Ranson Mortlock Memorial Research Trust for research into soil conservation and pasture regeneration.

In his will he left over £73,000 to cultural organizations and charities. The balance of his estate was divided between the State Library and the Waite Institute after his wife's death.

In 1986 the Mortlock Library of South Australiana was established as part of the State Library of South Australia.

The Mortlock Wing of the Library was named in recognition of his munificence.
