= Frederick Muir =

New Zealand cricketer

Personal information
- Full name: Frederick Joseph Muir
- Born: 1849; Mintaro, South Australia
- Died: 25 April 1921 (aged 71–72); Woollahra, New South Wales

Domestic team information
- Years: Team
- 1872/73: Otago
- Source: ESPNcricinfo, 18 May 2016

Frederick Joseph Muir (1849 – 25 April 1921) was an Australian cricketer. He played one first-class match in New Zealand for Otago during the 1872–73 season.

Muir was born at Mintaro in South Australia in 1849. His family moved to New Zealand and he was educated at Otago Boys' High School in Dunedin. He worked as an accountant but was declared bankrupt in 1891 and arrested on false pretences in Victoria the following year. In 1897 he was convicted of published an obscene poem in Western Australia and spent a year in jail.

Muir's only first-class match was a February 1873 fixture against Canterbury at the Hagley Oval in Christchurch, the only match in New Zealand to be given first-class status during the 1872–73 season. He scored three runs in the match. He died at Woollahra in New South Wales in 1926.
