= Beaumont House =

House in South Australia

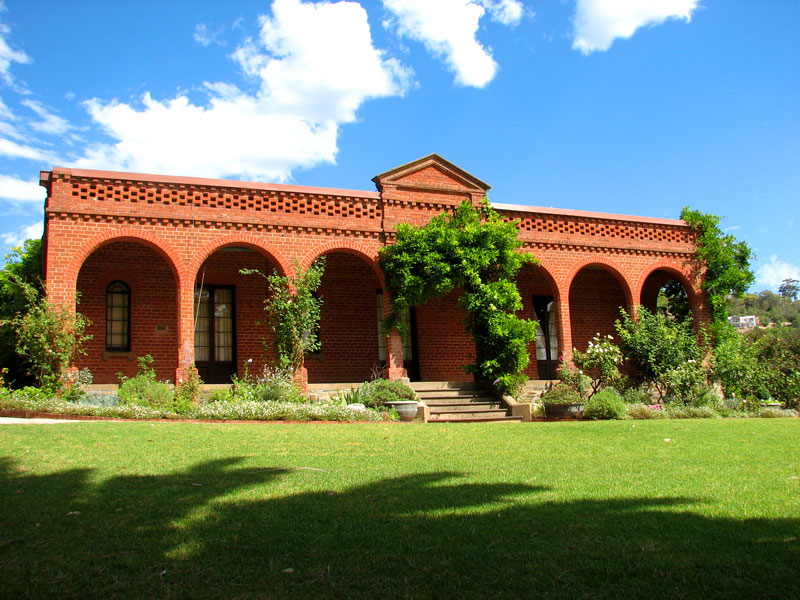
- The rear façade of Beaumont House
- Interactive map of the Beaumont House area

General information
- Architectural style: Eclectic Romanesque-Classical
- Location: Beaumont, South Australia, Australia
- Coordinates: 34°56′59″S 138°39′39″E
- Completed: 1851
- Client: Bp. Augustus Short

South Australian Heritage Register
- Official name: 'Beaumont House', Stables, Shed and Olive Grove
- Designated: 24 July 1980
- Reference no.: 10752

Beaumont House, occasionally known as Claremont, is an eclectic Romanesque-Classical brick residence located at 631 Glynburn Road in Beaumont, South Australia. Beaumont House was constructed for Augustus Short, the first Anglican bishop of Adelaide and founder of St Peter's Cathedral. It was constructed on land initially owned by Sir Samuel Davenport, a wealthy Adelaide landlord. Following Short's move back to England, Davenport purchased the house—the second of five eventual owners. Following three sales between 1907 and 1911, the house was then transferred to the National Trust of South Australia in 1968 and has been listed on the South Australian Heritage Register since 24 July 1980.

== History ==
The suburb of Beaumont, in the City of Burnside, was founded as a purpose-built village by Sir Samuel Davenport in 1848. The location of Beaumont to Adelaide, a rapidly developing settlement at the time, made land in the area extremely expensive. Although Adelaide as a new settlement was prospering during the mid-19th century, still very few people could afford the exclusivity of Beaumont.

Bishop Augustus Short moved from England to Adelaide after the Archbishop of Canterbury offered him the choice of moving to Newcastle—on the coast of New South Wales—or Adelaide, both recently established dioceses. He chose the latter, and was consecrated at Westminster Abbey on St Peter's Day, 29 June 1847. He arrived in Adelaide by ship on 28 December 1847.

== Construction ==
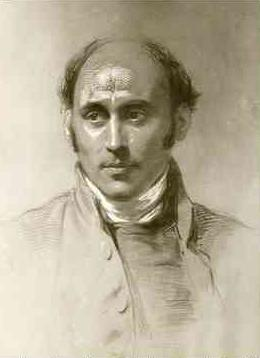
1847 portrait painting of Bishop Augustus Short.

Following the death of infant daughter Phillipa Augusta Short in the summer of 1848, (Note: One report mentions deaths in '47 and '48, but the other has not been found.) Short expressed an interest in a summer residence in Beaumont, and was wealthy enough to buy a large allotment from Davenport. Between 1849 and 1851, he had Beaumont House designed and built on a large allotment at the end of Glynburn Road, a major road which serviced the suburb of Beaumont, and linked to more major roads running west into the city of Adelaide along the Adelaide Plains. The Beaumont House estate was given the name 'Claremont' by Short. The location, in the foothills of the Mount Lofty Ranges, was chosen to catch the cool breezes coming from the sea across the Adelaide Plains.

Bishop Short and his family moved into the house later in 1851, and resided there until Bishop's Court, North Adelaide, was ready to be occupied in 1856. During the same year, Sir Samuel Davenport purchased the house and land from Bishop Short and lived in 'The Lodge', a small cottage at the entrance to what became the driveway to Beaumont House, until Short vacated Claremont.

Bishop Short later founded St Peter's Cathedral, an Anglican church, in 1869. However, a combination of declining health and disagreements of opinions over the next thirteen years saw him resign his precedence as bishop in 1872 and then as head of the diocese in 1881. He returned to England on 7 January 1882. At the time, the Claremont estate was valued at £8200.

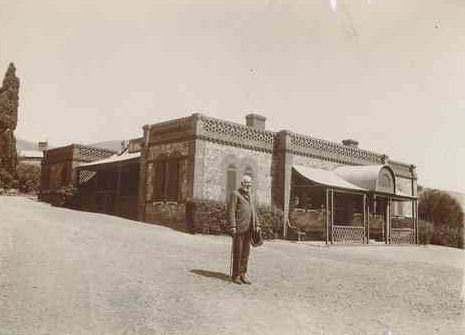
Sir Samuel Davenport at Beaumont House during 1880.

A cultivator of olives, Davenport had planted a limited number of olives around Beaumont House in 1852 after he purchased the land the year before. Davenport later expanded his groves by replanting trees and cuttings from Beaumont both in other areas of the allotment and at some of his other properties in the Adelaide Hills. He also planted mulberry trees for producing silk on the estate grounds.

Davenport resided in Beaumont House until his death on 3 September 1906; his wife having predeceased him on 6 February 1902, and they had no children. He left his estate mainly to his nephew Howard Davenport after his death, and both Houses of Parliament in South Australia adjourned for his funeral in tribute to his legacy.

In 1907 the estate was sold to a new owner, Major Vincent, who made extensive alterations to the house. It was then bought by a third owner in five years, Mr Bennet, in 1911. Upon his death the house was passed on to his widow. Beaumont House was then transferred to the National Trust of South Australia by Bennet's widow, who had remarried, and her new partner on 24 August 1968.

== Architecture and alterations ==
Originally a five-bedroom residence, the Beaumont House estate has been expanded greatly. Most of the structural expansion took place between 1907 and 1911, when Maj. Vincent owned it; it has not been expanded or notably altered at all since being donated to the National Trust.

The estate is strongly reminiscent of Romanesque architecture, mainly due to alterations made to the house and grounds by Davenport. A member of the National Trust, the current owner of Beaumont House, explains how Davenport's travels influenced his styles:

Samuel Davenport was a great world traveller. He was very much involved in the world exposition movement. Every two years there were big world expos happening in different cities around the world. And he would travel to every one of these expos...I'm sure that the influences that he picked up in all of his travels are reflected here in Beaumont House.

The olive groves are no longer cultivated on the grounds of Beaumont House, but other notable additions by Davenport to the Romanesque style still remain. The house is occasionally described as 'Mediterranean', mostly due to the red Tuscan-styled roof, the olive groves and pillared exterior.

== See also ==
- List of historic houses in South Australia
- National Trust of South Australia
