= Andrew Tennant (pastoralist) =

Australian politician (1835–1913)

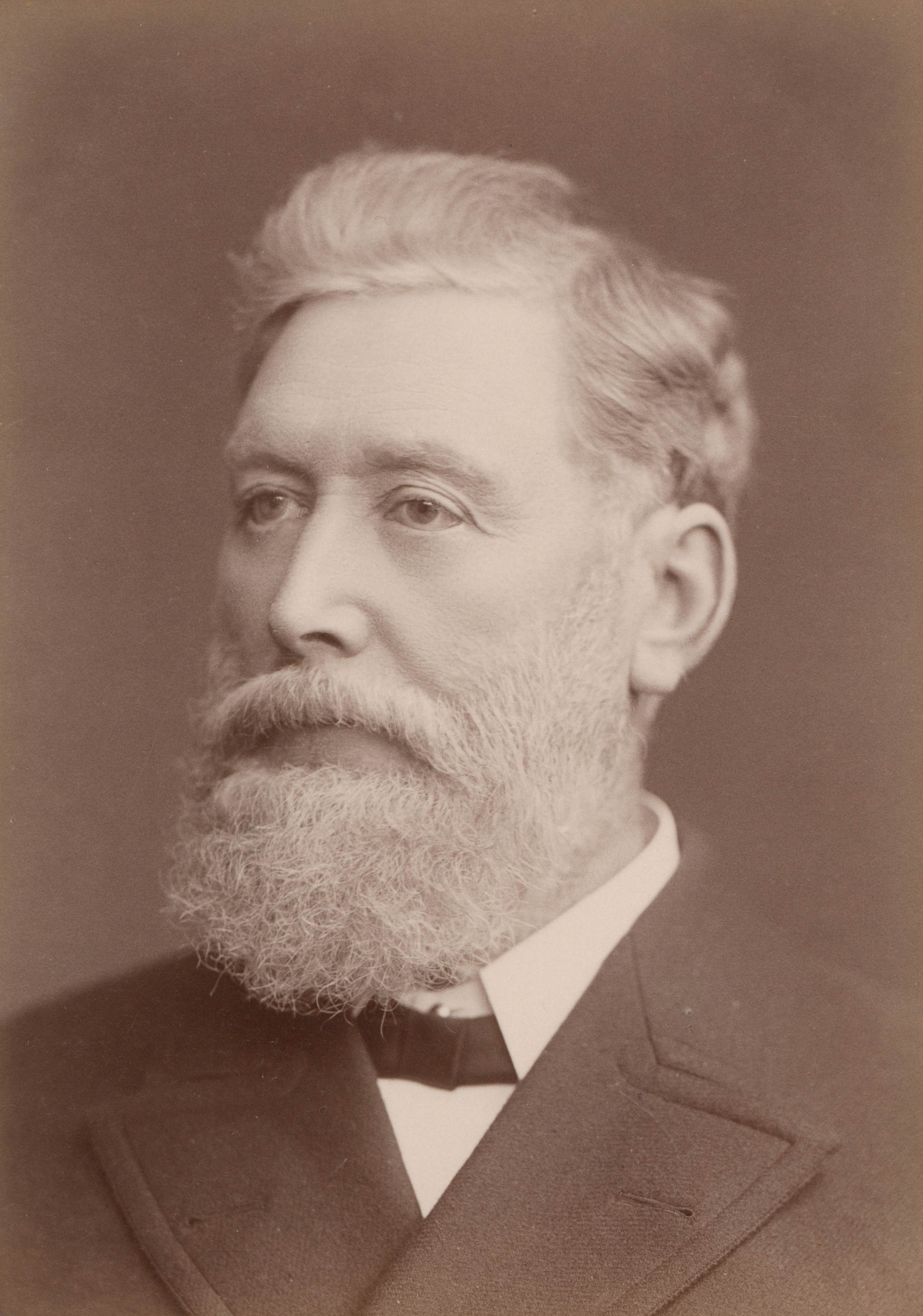
- Born: 20 June 1835; Hawick, Roxburghshire, Scotland
- Died: 19 July 1913 (aged 78); Essenside, Moseley Street, Glenelg, South Australia
- Resting place: Brighton Cemetery
- Occupations: pastoralist, businessman and politician
- Spouse: Rachael Christina Ferguson
- Children: John Tennant (1864–1941), Rosina Forsayth "Rosie" Mortlock (1867–1939), William Andrew Tennant (1868–1929), Andrew Tennant (1870–1873), Jessie Clara Thomson (1873–1958), Frederick Augustus Tennant (1874–1937), Adelaide Hawker (1874–1952)
- Parent(s): John Tennant (1799–1867) and Jessie née Aitken (1813–1896)
- Relatives: William Ranson Mortlock (brother-in-law), Harry Bickford (husband of sister-in-law)

Member for Flinders in South Australian House of Assembly
- In office 1881–1887

Member for Northern District in South Australian Legislative Council
- In office 1898–1902

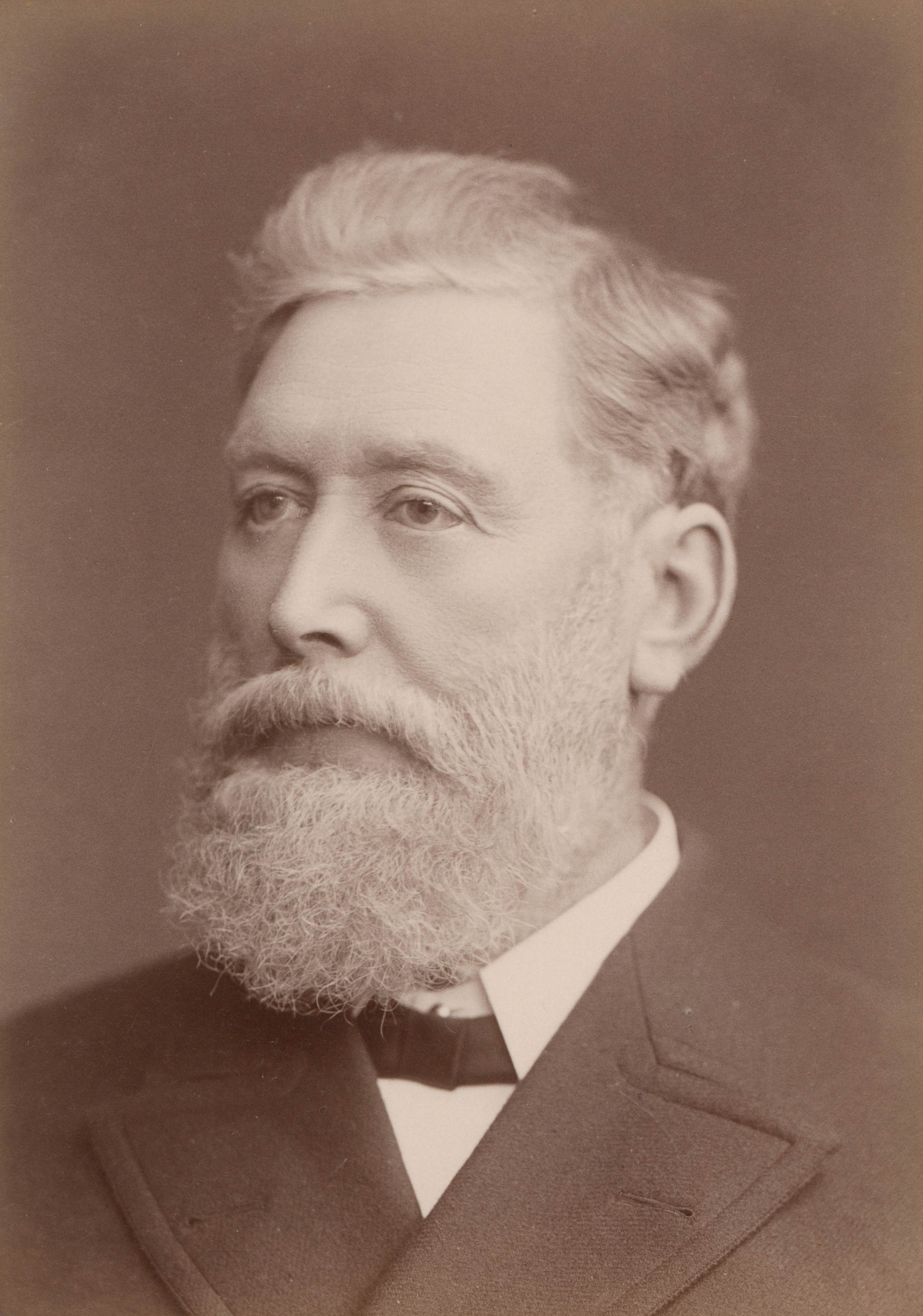
ca. 1890

Andrew Tennant (20 June 1835 – 19 July 1913) was a Scottish-born Australian pastoralist, businessman and politician. He was a member of the South Australian House of Assembly from 1881 to 1887, representing Flinders, and a member of the South Australian Legislative Council from 1898 to 1902, representing Northern District.

== Early years ==
Andrew was born on 20 June 1835 at Hawick, Roxburghshire, Scotland, to John Tennant and his wife Jessie née Aitken. Soon after they migrated to South Australia with an assisted passage, arriving in the Duchess of Northumberland on 17 December 1839. A newspaper obituary had him arriving two days later with John Colton on the Duchess of Sutherland. Andrew was educated at E. W. Wickes' school in North Adelaide.

John began "pastoral pursuits", initially at Dry Creek on the Adelaide Plains, and then at Chain of Ponds in the Adelaide Hills, Lyndoch Valley in the Gumeracha district, and Burra. John became the first person to successfully move stock overland from Adelaide, via Port Augusta to Port Lincoln at the southern tip of Eyre Peninsula. He purchased Tallala station, 15 miles (24 km) from Port Lincoln, from a Mr. White of White Park, and raised cattle and sheep there for many years.

In 1853, Andrew commenced his own "pastoral pursuits", taking cattle west from Port Lincoln and settling for seven years on an abandoned site near Elliston, before owning several stations on southern Eyre Peninsula at Mount Wedge, Coffin Bay, and Streaky Bay.

On 28 August 1862 he married Rachael Christina Ferguson in Adelaide.

== Pastoralist ==
In 1866 he leased "Baroota" near Port Germein, and subsequently bought and sold a number of properties in the mid-north, north-east and far-north of South Australia, resulting in him owning a number of large stations of over 1,000 square miles (2,600 km^{2}) in area. Although initially interested in cattle, he also developed an interest in sheep, and owned land further south near Riverton, and a number of stations in New Zealand. In 1880 his eldest son John moved to New Zealand where they took up 25,000 acres of pastoral land. Andrew also owned a number of properties in the city of Adelaide.

Tennant and James Moseley in 1904 acquired and re-established the 1,487 square miles (3,851 km^{2}) Yardea Station in 1904 after it had been abandoned a few years earlier.

== Businessman ==
Tennant was a director of the Adelaide Steamship Co. Ltd. from its inception, a justice of the peace, a Freemason, and was heavily involved in breeding, raising and racing thoroughbred horses. He also held interests in coal mines and gold mines.

== Politician ==
From 1881 to 1887 Tennant represented the seat of Flinders in the South Australian House of Assembly. He then moved to the Legislative Council where he represented the Northern District from 1898 to 1902.

== Later years ==
Tennant died of diabetes and senile dementia in his home, Essenside, (Moseley Street, Glenelg), on 19 July 1913, and was buried in the Brighton cemetery. He was survived by his wife, three daughters and three of his four sons.

== Essenside ==
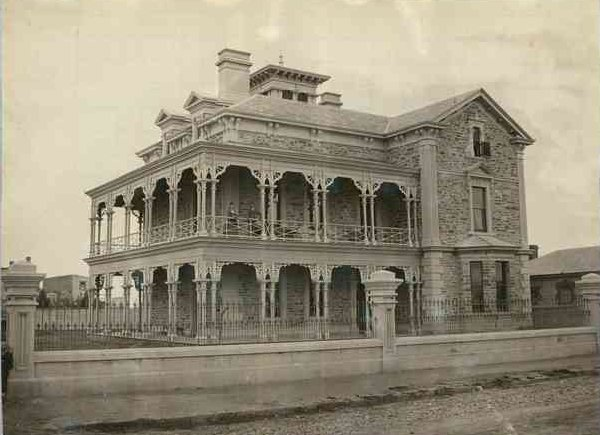
Essenside ca. 1872

Essenside was located on the northern corner of Moseley and College Streets, Glenelg, a beachside western suburb of Adelaide.

=== 1868-1876 ===
Edward M. (Ned) Bagot acquired the land in 1868 and erected an eight-roomed house on the site designed by Rowland Rees in 1873.

=== 1877-1921 ===
Andrew Tennant acquired the property in 1877 and made significant extensions to the original building.

=== Essenside Mansions ===
The building was sold again in 1926, and again in 1930, but by now had become a "magnificent block of 10 self-contained flats". In the 1930s and 1940s, to spend one's summer holidays at Essenside Mansions was worthy of mention in the Advertiser's Social column. In July 1937 an announcement appeared in The Advertiser for "a bridge party for the St Peter's Glenelg Lacrosse Club" to be held at Essenside.

=== 1972 ===
The building was demolished in 1972.

== Family ==
John Tennant (c. 1799 – 11 May 1867) married Jessie Aitken (c. 1813 – 12 February 1896)

- Margaret Tennant ( – ) married William Ranson Mortlock (1821 – 10 May 1884) on

- William Tennant Mortlock (1858–1913) married cousin Rosina Forsyth "Rosie" Tennant (c. 1870–1939) on 28 January 1891. She was daughter of Andrew Tennant (1835–1913) see below

- Andrew Tennant (20 June 1835 – 19 July 1913) married Rachael Christina Ferguson (1840 – 13 May 1921) on 28 August 1862, lived at Tallala Station near Port Lincoln, "Essenside", Glenelg. Their children were:

- John Tennant (1864 – 26 May 1941) married (cousin?) Margaret Barr Love ( – 19 May 1954) on 10 August 1898, lived Princess Royal Station c. 1906

- Andrew Tennant (c. 1899–1974) married Gwendoline Letitia "Gwen" Goodman (1905–1998) on 11 October 1928. Gwen was a daughter of Sir William Goodman. Both were interred at the North Road cemetery.
- Joan Royal Tennant (1906– ) married Brian Herbert Swift in 1934

- Rosina Forsayth "Rosie" Tennant (c. 1867 – 1939) married cousin William Tennant Mortlock (1858–1913) on 28 January 1891 (a double wedding). He was son of Margaret Tennant and William Ranson Mortlock, see above
- William Andrew Tennant (1868 – 20 February 1929) married Elizabeth Mary Meincke (1900) and Matilda Elsie Audacia Hobbs née Polkinghorne (1925)
- Jessie Clara "Clayre" Tennant (1872–1958) married William Anstruther-Thomson (1860– ) on 28 January 1891 (a double wedding). He was ADC to the Governor
- Frederick Augustus Tennant (22 July 1874 – c. 20 November 1937) married Kathleen Hammill ( – ) on 28 October 1914, moved to Melbourne
- Adelaide Tennant (22 July 1874 – 8 April 1952) married Richard McDonnell Hawker (1866 – 24 March 1930), son of G. C. Hawker on 25 February 1903
