= Augustus Short =

Australian bishop (1802–1883)

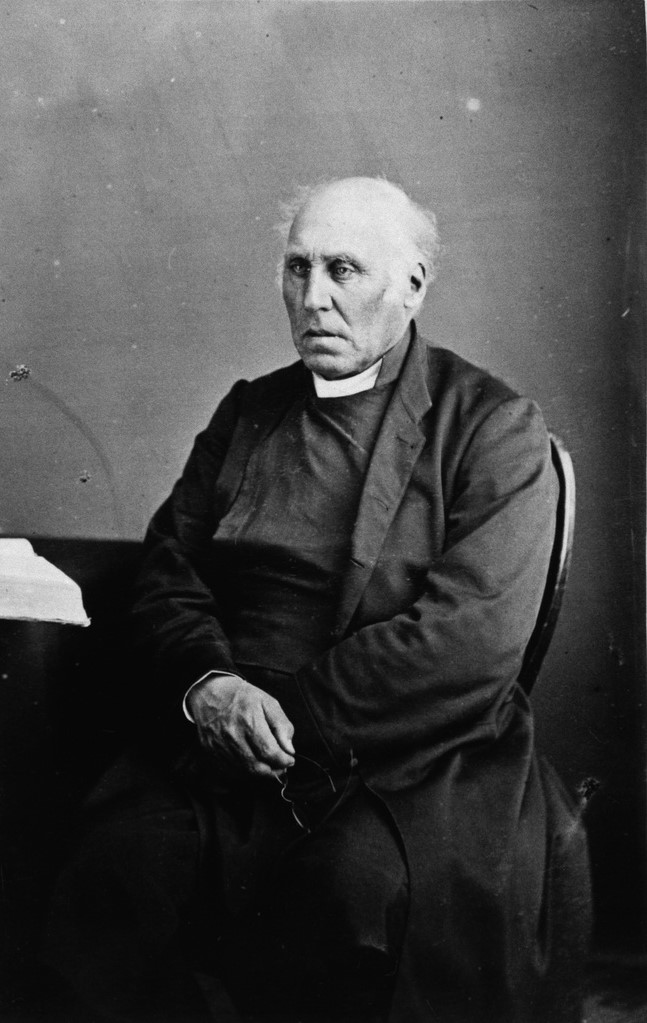

The Right Reverend Dr Augustus Short (11 June 1802 – 5 October 1883) was the first Anglican bishop of Adelaide, South Australia. Short died at Eastbourne (or London) on 5 October 1883, his estate was valued for probate at £8200.

Short Street in Fremantle is named after him.

== Career as a bishop ==
=== Charitable works ===
In 1856 he instigated, with the support of Adelaide churches of all denominations, the South Australian Female Refuge for practical support and protection of homeless girls and women, and was its first vice-president. The facility, previously known as "Norwood House", at the corner of Sydenham Road and William Street, Norwood, opened in 1857, and in later years was known more simply as the South Australian Refuge.

== Bibliography ==
- Fred T. Whitington Augustus Short, first bishop of Adelaide : a chapter of colonial church history E.S. Wigg & Son, Adelaide, 1887.
- Serle, Percival (1949). "Short, Augustus". Dictionary of Australian Biography. Sydney: Angus & Robertson.

== See also ==
- Beaumont House, Short's now-historical residence
- North Road Cemetery, an historic cemetery established by Short in 1853 on land he once owned

Anglican Communion titles
New office	Bishop of Adelaide; 1847–1882	Succeeded by George Kennion
