= Martindale Hall =

Mansion in Mintaro, South Australia

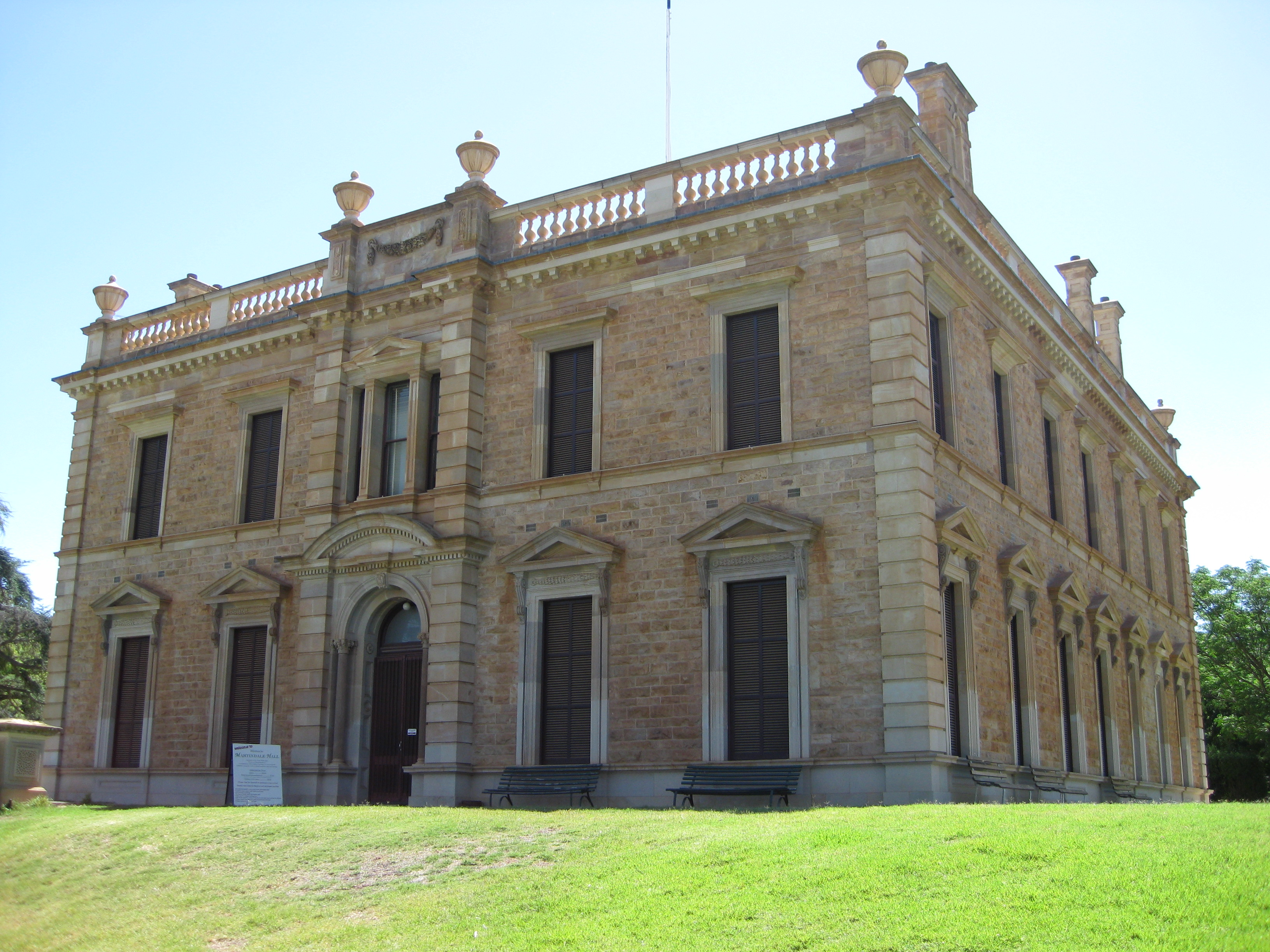
- Interactive map of the Martindale Hall area

General information
- Architectural style: Georgian
- Location: Near Mintaro, South Australia, Australia
- Coordinates: 33.9378°S 138.7294°E
- Construction started: 1877
- Completed: 1880
- Cost: £30,000
- Client: Edmond Bowman

Design and construction
- Architect: Ebenezer Gregg
- Engineer: Edward John Woods

Martindale Hall is a Georgian style mansion near Mintaro, South Australia which appeared in the film Picnic at Hanging Rock.

== Construction ==
Martindale Hall was built for a wealthy bachelor pastoralist, Edmund Bowman Jr (1855–1921). The architect was Ebenezer Gregg of London, the chief supervisor was Adelaide architect Edward John Woods and the builder was R. Huckson, who completed the work in 1880. Due to the specialist nature of the work involved, 50 of the 60 tradesmen were brought from England, and they returned when it was completed. The hall has 32 rooms and also a large seven-room cellar, and its environs at the time also included a polo ground, a racecourse, a boating lake and a cricket pitch.

== History ==
A decade after its construction, debt and drought forced the Bowmans to sell all their holdings. William Tennant Mortlock (son of William Ranson Mortlock) bought Martindale Hall in 1891. His son, John Andrew Tennant Mortlock, developed Martindale Station and built up an impressive collection of artwork which was displayed at the Hall. In his will Mortlock bequeathed 400 acres of farmland and the Hall to the University of Adelaide and the Libraries Board of South Australia, while providing a life interest in the estate to his widow Dorothy Mortlock. Dying childless, his wife became the heir to the Mortlock fortune, and she bequeathed Martindale Hall and the estate to the University of Adelaide in 1979 upon her death.

On 21 March 1978, it was listed on the now-defunct Register of the National Estate On 24 July 1980, it was listed as a state heritage place on the South Australian Heritage Register.

Martindale Hall along with 19 hectares (47 acres) of grounds were later handed to the South Australian Government by the university in 1986. On 5 December 1991, the land on which the building is located was proclaimed as the Martindale Hall Conservation Park under the National Parks and Wildlife Act 1972 for "the purpose of conserving the historic features of the land". From 1991 to late 2014, the property was managed under lease as a tourism enterprise, offering heritage accommodation, weddings and other functions, and access to the grounds and Hall to day visitors. The property is currently managed by the Department for Environment and Water, which in August 2015 received an unsolicited bid for the purchase or long-term lease of Martindale Hall. by the National Trust of South Australia.

== Fight to save ==
The public of South Australia are determined to keep the Hall open to the public. Opposition to the push to privatize the Hall began in the 1970s when Adelaide University started selling off the surrounding area. A crowd of 5,000 people attended the Hall in the 1970s to protest the university's action.

In May 2016 the National Trust of South Australia launched a surprise bid to operate historic Martindale Hall under a plan it said should transform the 136-year-old estate into a major tourist destination and keep the building in public hands. The proposal would see a new National Art Exhibition space, and a re-created Pleasure Garden.

However, on Wednesday 9 June 2021, the S.A. House of Assembly passed a so-called "Martindale Hall (Protection and Management) Bill 2021" under which the appropriate Minister may grant "An access agreement entered into under this section in respect of a lease attaches to the land and is binding on every other person who holds a lease or licence in relation to Martindale Hall." This allows the Minister to grant restricted use of the Hall subject to a lease.

== Usage ==
The Hall and grounds are currently open to the public, six days a week (closed Tuesdays), as a day visitor site and museum.

== Gallery ==
Edmund Bowman Jr in 1914.

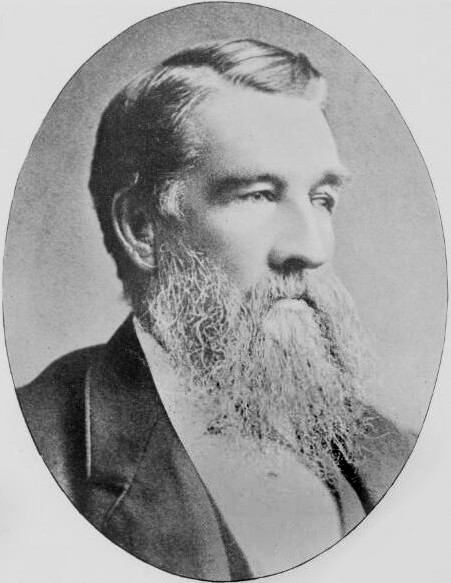
William Tennant Mortlock in 1901.

John Mortlock in 1936.

Martindale Hall in 1932.
