= James Stein =

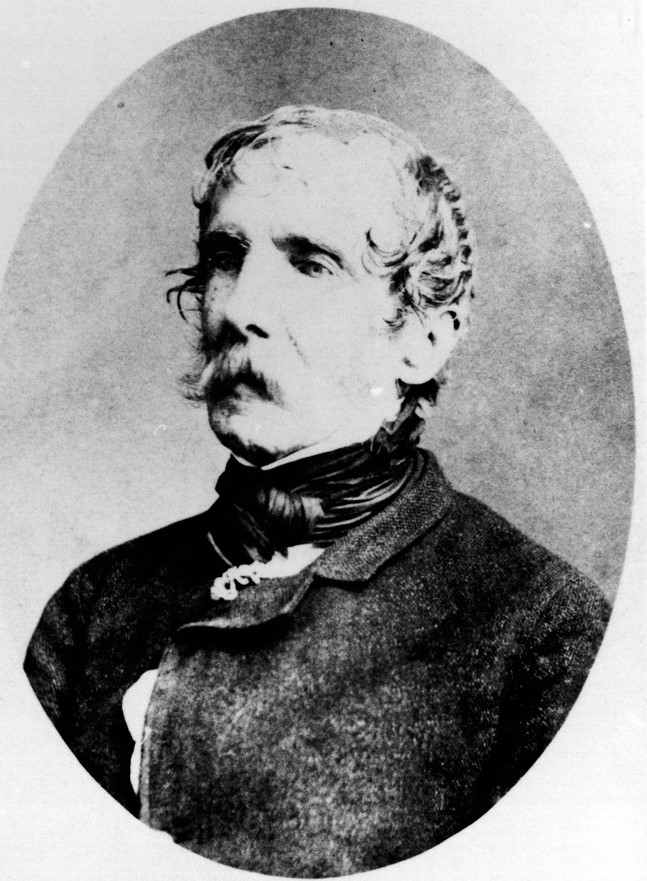

James Stein (c.1804 – 25 October 1877) was a pioneering settler of the Mid North of South Australia and founder of the Kadlunga pastoralism estate.

== Early life and family ==
James Stein was closely associated with Scottish nobility. A scion of an important whisky distilling family, he was born c.1804 in Scotland, a son of John Stein (b.1769-c.1814), of Kilbagie, Clackmannanshire, Scotland, a London banker and member 1796-1802 of the House of Commons for Bletchingley.

James Stein's sister, Anne Duff (Stein) (1788–1859), Countess of Fife, was married to General Sir Alexander Duff. Their son James was created Baron Skene, whose son Alexander, 1st Duke of Fife, married Princess Louise, eldest daughter of King Edward VII.

In 1829, the distillery interests of Stein's father and uncles, who had earlier been much connected at Canonmills with whisky distillers James and John Haig, struck financial difficulties and all related partnerships were dissolved. Young James Stein, having the benefit of a good education, then sought to make his own fortune in Australia, arriving at Sydney in September 1833 on the ship Sir John Roe Reid.

== Australia and overlanding ==
He then engaged in squatting pursuits in New South Wales as a pioneering grazier, firstly in the Goulburn district and then in the Yass district. Being an accomplished cross-country rider, Stein was actively involved in the local hunt club as a participant and organizer of the Argyle Hounds. Along with other 'sporting gentleman' he rode horses in both match races and steeplechases. His neighbor and friend at Yass was William Hardy, brother of John Richard Hardy (1807–58), Yass newspaper editor and police magistrate.

In 1839 in Sydney he joined up with several other young gentlemen of the Yass district, namely Charles Campbell, Evelyn Sturt, and William Hardy in a livestock overlanding venture. By then, within this group and more commonly, he was called Jamie Stein. They hired 24 men and during April to July 1839 overlanded 5,000 sheep, as well as 200 head of cattle and twenty horses, from Bathurst to Adelaide, this being the first livestock overlanding party to follow the Murrumbidgee River. With 513 ewes from this flock, Stein and Sturt then went into a short-term pastoralism partnership at Meadows, just south of Adelaide. Campbell and Stein then became close business associates, jointly undertaking a further two overland livestock expeditions during 1839–40.

== Pastoralism in Mid-North South Australia ==
In 1841, following the 1839 explorations and discoveries of John Hill and Edward John Eyre in South Australia's Mid North, both Campbell and Stein took out occupation licences there and pioneered their own sheep runs. Campbell's was at Hill River, while Stein's run extended from Mount Horrocks, through the Farrell Flat district around the headwaters of the Wakefield River, stretching over surrounding rolling hills and plains to include parts of Burra Creek. Other parts of that creek were on the pastoral run of William Peter of Gum Creek, near present Manoora.

Among Stein's shepherds, watching his flocks upon the unfenced run, were several "Afghan" men, also described as "coolies", originally brought as servants from India by E.B. Gleeson, a settler at nearby Clare. They are reputed to have named Burra Burra Creek, a part of Stein's run, although this etymology is strongly disputed. It was here that in 1845 William Strear (or Streair), a shepherd employed by Stein, found the ore sample that led to discovery of the fabulously profitable Burra copper mines, although Stein gained no personal profit.

== Kadlunga Estate ==
The base of Stein's holdings was Kadlunga homestead, which he founded in a vale beneath Mount Horrocks, about three kilometres west of present Mintaro. An early partner (and successor) in Stein's Mid North pastoralism ventures was John Oakden, a nephew of Colonial Treasurer Osmond Gilles. At times Oakden managed Kadlunga Station for Stein, while at other times he leased it from Stein (or from Stein's creditors).

Stein participated prominently in community life in the Mid North, including as a promoter and judge of horseracing events, magistrate, and (until his resignation in 1853) as Justice of the Peace. Not wishing to seem partisan, he participated in multiple fraternal lodges including Oddfellows and Freemasonry. He was fondly remembered as 'the life and soul' of any celebration. During that period, despite apparent wealth and influence, he carried increasing debts and mortgaged his wide-ranging estate. His declaration of insolvency in September 1848 was an irreparable step.

His Kadlunga Station later became a merino sheep stud and Percheron horse stud, being successively owned by John Chewings (1816–79), Sir Samuel Way (1836–1916), and then Sir John Melrose (1860–1938).

== Impoverished later life ==
In the mid-1850s Stein moved to the South East of South Australia. For the next twenty years, in contrast to the sharp dress, wealth, and eminence of his early life, Stein's life was marked by destitution and then invalidity. Nevertheless, he was an aristocrat to the end, recognised for maintaining a proud, gentlemanly, and genial demeanour, while still being visited by influential friends.

Employed as a humble pound keeper at The Springs Ponds near Millicent, he enforced the Livestock Impounding Act while residing in a mere hut. Suffering prolonged feeble health, he died at Mount Gambier on 27 October 1877, aged 73 years. There is no record that he had ever married.

His detailed biography and portrait appear in Pastoral Pioneers of South Australia. His portrait photograph is also held by the State Library of South Australia.

== Legacy ==
The original picturesque stone homestead buildings of Kadlunga estate, founded by Stein, remain a tribute to pioneer builders. The reputation of Kadlunga became much enhanced in the hands of later owners as a place of Australian national significance, being a famed sheep, cattle, and horse stud associated with a succession of prominent South Australians, each adding intrinsic architectural features. Kadlunga was listed on the Register of the National Estate in 1978.

Stein Hill, 605m, a prominence in the north Mount Lofty Ranges about 7.5 kilometres south east of Burra, bears his name. Stein Hill is part of the Stein Hill Land System which represents the east facing slopes of the Burra Hills south of the Burra - Morgan road.
