= William Ranson Mortlock =

Australian politician

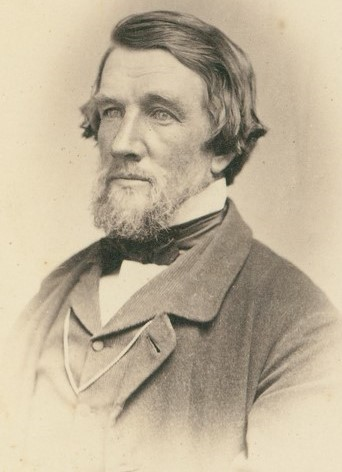

William Ranson Mortlock (1821 – 10 May 1884) was a grazier and politician in colonial South Australia.

Mortlock was born at Moat House, Melbourn, Cambridgeshire, England. Mortlock arrived in South Australia on the Imaum of Muscat on 9 November 1843. In 1850 at Port Lincoln he married Margaret, 18-year-old daughter of John Tennant who had arrived in South Australia from Scotland in 1839. He was a veterinary surgeon and sheep inspector in Adelaide for a period. In 1847, he occupied land near Port Lincoln that would subsequently become Yalluna Station, and he resigned his inspector role in 1856. He acquired three more leases in 1867-68: the Mount Arden, Pichi Richi, and Yudnapinna Stations.

He was elected to the South Australian House of Assembly at the 1868 election, representing Flinders, but did not contest the 1870 election. He was elected for Flinders a second time at the 1871 election, but again declined to recontest at the 1875 election, and advertised that he was leaving the colony soon afterwards. He was elected for a third time at the 1878 election and re-elected in 1881, before being defeated in 1884, just weeks before his death.

He died in 1884 at Avenel House, Medindie, aged 63. His son, William Tennant Mortlock, inherited and expanded his pastoral empire and was elected to parliament for his old seat. Along with his son, daughter-in-law Rosina, grandson, John Andrew Tennant Mortlock (1894–1950), and John's wife Dorothy Elizabeth Mortlock (1906–1979), the Mortlock family left the Waite Agricultural Research Institute, the University of Adelaide, the State Library of South Australia, the City of Adelaide and the State of South Australia with many significant and lasting legacies.
