= William Tennant Mortlock =

Australian politician

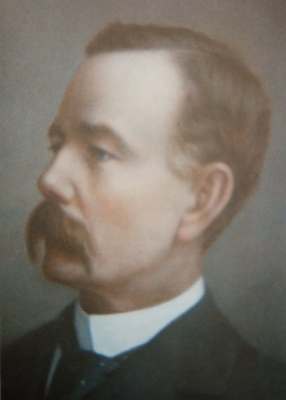
- Born: 18 May 1858; Port Lincoln, South Australia
- Died: 17 August 1913 (aged 55); Mintaro, South Australia
- Resting place: North Road Cemetery
- Spouse: Rosina Forsyth Tennant (1866–1939)
- Children: Valentine Tennant Mortlock (1897–1906), William Ranson Mortlock (1891–1892), John Andrew Tennant Mortlock (1894–1950), Frederick Ranson Mortlock (1900–1936)
- Parent(s): William Ranson Mortlock and Margaret nee Tennant
- Relatives: Andrew Tennant (uncle and father in law)

William Tennant Mortlock (1858 – 17 August 1913) was a South Australian grazier and politician.

Mortlock was born near Port Lincoln, the son of William Ranson Mortlock. He was educated at St Peter's College, Adelaide and Jesus College, Cambridge. He read for the law at the Inner Temple while in England, but returned to South Australia in 1883 and did not pursue his legal studies further. He worked on his father's Yudnapinna Station, near Port Augusta, and he increased the family's pastoral property after inheriting it upon his father's death in 1884. In 1891 he purchased Martindale Hall at Mintaro, which would become his family's main station.

Mortlock was elected to the South Australian House of Assembly at the 1896 election, winning his father's old seat of Flinders. He re-entered parliament in 1901, winning a by-election for Flinders caused by the election of Alexander Poynton to the inaugural Australian House of Representatives at the 1901 federal election. However, he was again defeated at the 1902 election.

He was heavily involved with the racing industry, serving as chairman of the Port Augusta Racing Club and co-founding the Martindale Racing Club; he also bred and raced Yudnapinna, winner of the 1911 Adelaide Grand National.

He married Rosina Forsyth Tennant on 28 January 1891 at St. Peter's Church, Glenelg in a double-wedding with her sister, Clayre Jessie Tennant; both were daughters of Andrew Tennant. Rosina and William were cousins, as Andrew Tennant was a brother of William's mother Margaret.

He died in a private hospital in North Adelaide in 1913, aged 55, following a six-month illness. He was interred in the Mortlock family vault at the North Road Cemetery.

== See also ==
- Hundred of Mortlock
