= List of National Trust properties in Australia =

This list includes any stately home, historic house, museum or other property in the care of the autonomous state and territory branches of the National Trust of Australia. Many, but not all, of these are open to the public.

== Australian Capital Territory ==
- Lanyon Homestead (staffed by the Trust, but owned by the ACT Government)

== New South Wales ==
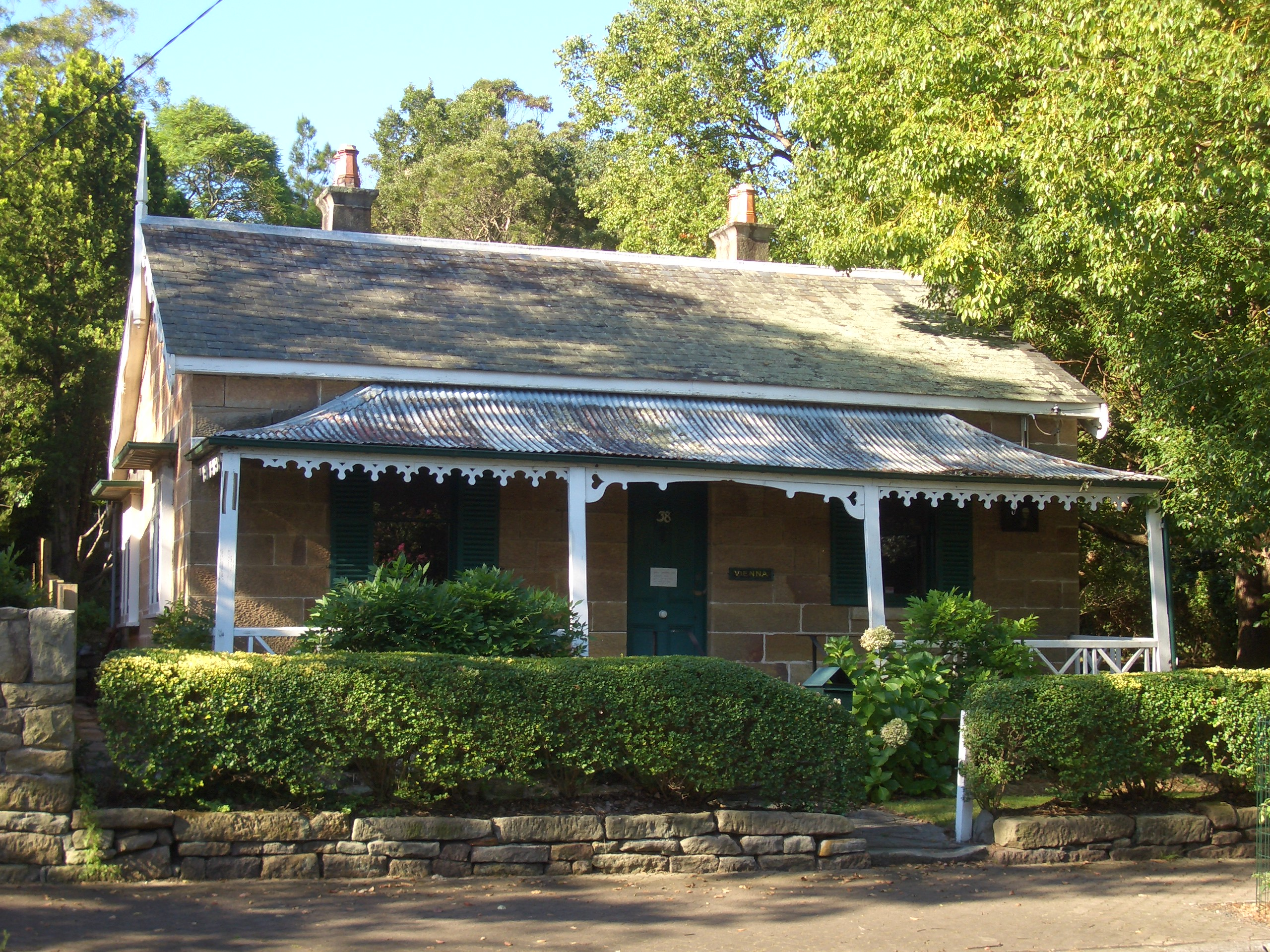
Vienna, Hunters Hill

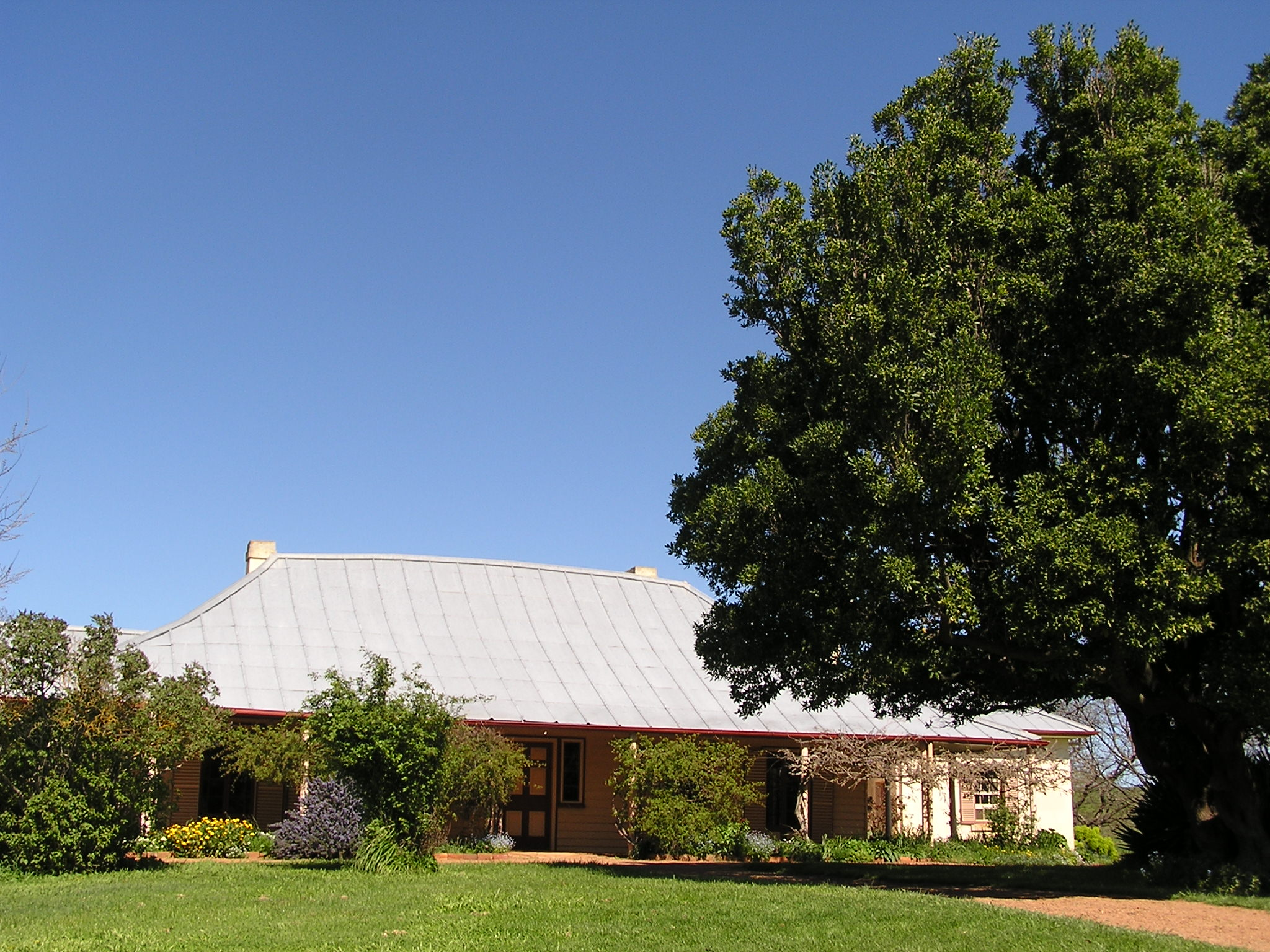
Cooma Cottage, Yass

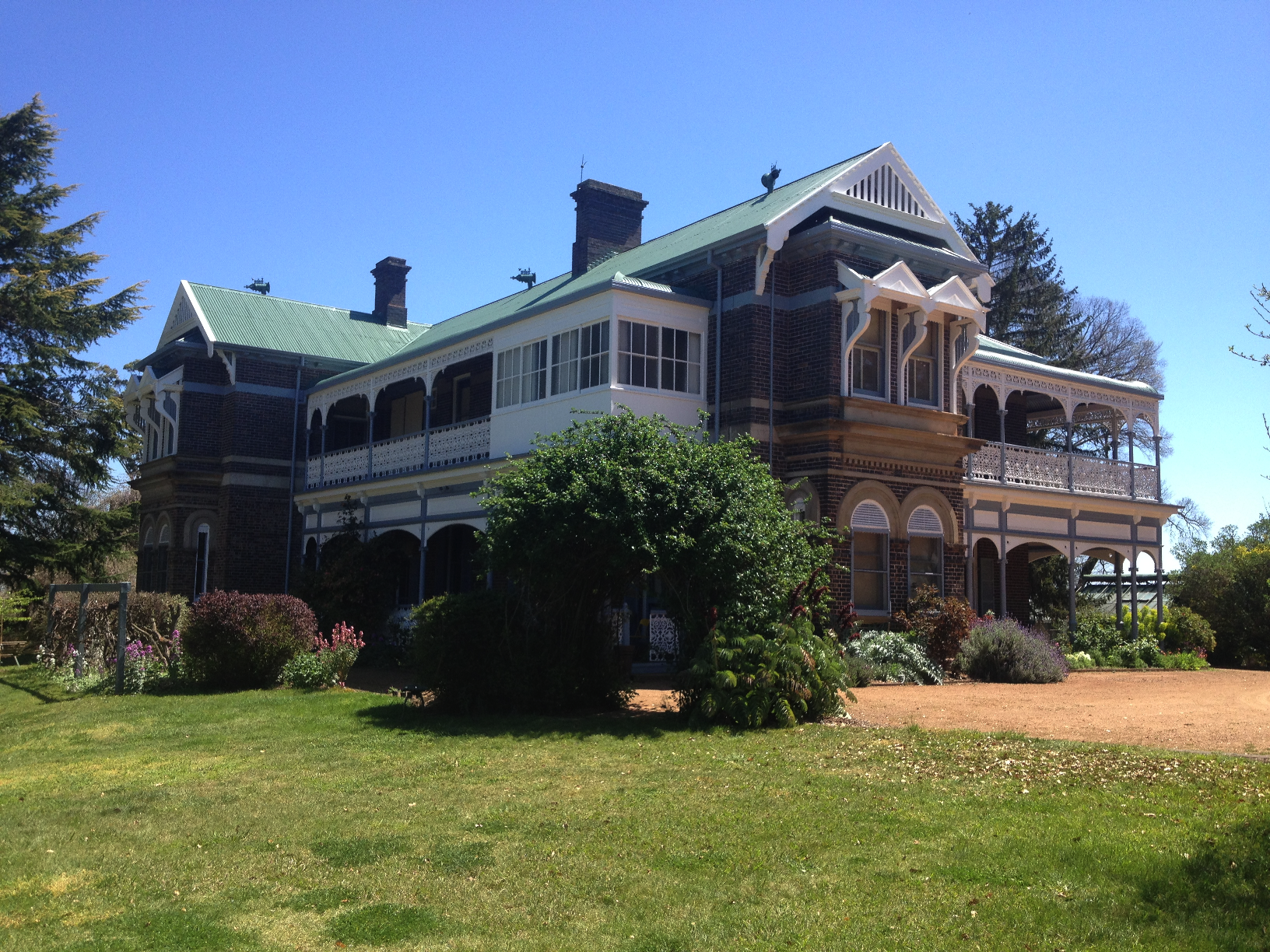
Saumarez Homestead, Armidale

- Ahimsa, Cheltenham
- Bedervale, Braidwood (contents only)
- Cooma Cottage, Yass
- Dalwood House, Branxton (grounds of Wyndham Estate)
- Dundullimal, Dubbo
- Everglades Gardens, Leura
- Experiment Farm Cottage, Harris Park
- Grossmann House and Brough House, Maitland
- Golden Vale Homestead, Sutton Forrest
- Harper's Mansion, Berrima
- Lindesay, Darling Point
- Miss Porter's House, Newcastle
- Miss Traill's House & Garden, Bathurst
- Norman Lindsay Gallery, Faulconbridge
- Old Government House, Parramatta
- Retford Park, Bowral
- Riversdale, Goulburn
- Saumarez Homestead, Armidale
- S. H. Ervin Gallery, The Rocks
- St Ignatius Convent School, Wentworth (by appointment only)
- Sir Henry Parkes School of Arts, Tenterfield
- Tomago House, Tomago
- Vienna, Hunters Hill
- Wirrimbirra Sanctuary, between Tahmoor and Bargo
- Woodford Academy, Woodford

=== See also ===
- Historic Houses Trust of New South Wales

== Northern Territory ==
- Borroloola Police Station, Borroloola
- Burnett House, Darwin
- Daly Waters Aviation Complex, near Daly Waters
- Hartley Street School, Alice Springs
- Jones Store, Newcastle Waters
- Katherine Railway Station, Katherine
- Magistrates House, Darwin
- Stuart Town Gaol, Alice Springs
- O'Keeffe Residence, Katherine
- Old Boab Tree, Darwin City, Northern Territory
- Pine Creek Museum, Pine Creek
- Pine Creek Railway Precinct, Pine Creek
- Tuxworth Fullwood House, Tennant Creek

== Queensland ==
- Brennan and Geraghtys Store, Maryborough
- Currumbin Wildlife Sanctuary, Gold Coast
- Grandchester railway station, Grandchester, Queensland
- Hou Wang Chinese Temple and Museum, Atherton
- Cooktown Museum (formerly James Cook Historical Museum), Cooktown
- National Trust Heritage Centre, Townsville
- Royal Bull's Head Inn, Toowoomba
- Stock Exchange Arcade, Charters Towers
- Wolston House, Wacol
- Zara Clark Museum, Charters Towers

== South Australia ==
- 1910 Congregational Church, Keith (by appointment only)
- Ayers House, Adelaide
- Beaumont House, Beaumont
- Cape Jaffa Lighthouse, Kingston SE
- Ceduna Museum, Ceduna
- Cobdogla Irrigation Museum, Barmera
- Collingrove Homestead, Angaston
- Courthouse Museum, Millicent, Millicent
- Cowell Agricultural Museum, Cowell
- Cowell Historical Museum, Cowell
- Crystal Brook Heritage Centre, Crystal Brook
- Customs House, Robe
- Early Settler's Cottage, Keith (by appointment only)
- Encounter Coast Discovery Centre, Victor Harbor
- Gamble Cottage, Blackwood
- Glencoe Woolshed, Mount Gambier
- Goolwa Museum, Goolwa
- Hope Cottage Museum, Kingscote, Kangaroo Island
- Hughes Pump House, Moonta
- Jamestown Railway Station and Goods Shed, Jamestown
- Koppio Smithy Museum, Koppio
- Maitland Museum, Maitland
- Matta House, Kadina
- Mill Cottage, Port Lincoln
- Millicent Museum, Millicent
- Minlaton Museum, Minlaton
- Miners Cottage and Heritage Garden, Moonta
- Moonta Mines Public School, Moonta
- Moonta Mines Sweets Shop, Moonta
- Mount Laura Station, Whyalla
- Napper's Accommodation House, Barmera
- Old Centenary Hall, Balaklava
- Old Council Chambers, Cleve (by appointment only)
- Old Highercombe Hotel, Tea Tree Gully
- Old Telegraph Station, Gawler
- Old Police Station and Courthouse, Auburn
- Old Police Station, Clare
- Old Railway Superintendent's Cottage, Goolwa (by appointment only)
- Old Wool and Grain Store, Beachport
- Olivewood, Renmark
- Overland Corner Hotel, Overland Corner
- Penneshaw Maritime and Folk Museum, Penneshaw, Kangaroo Island
- Petticoat Lane, Penola
- Police Station and Courthouse, Strathalbyn
- Police Station and Courthouse Complex, Melrose
- Port Elliot Railway Station, Port Elliot
- Port Pirie Railway Station and Customs House, Port Pirie
- The Sheep's Back, Naracoorte
- Stangate House and Garden, Mount Lofty (by appointment only)
- Streaky Bay Museum, Streaky Bay
- Wallaroo Heritage and Nautical Museum, Wallaroo
- Wellington Courthouse, Wellington
- Willunga Courthouse Museum, Willunga
- Winn's Bakehouse, Coromandel Valley

== Tasmania ==
- Clarendon, near Evandale
- Franklin House, Launceston
- Home Hill, Devonport
- Latrobe Court House, Latrobe
- Oak Lodge (Richmond, Tasmania), Richmond
- Old Umbrella Shop, Launceston
- Penghana, Queenstown
- Penitentiary Chapel and Criminal Courts, Hobart
- Runnymede, Hobart
- White House, Westbury

== Victoria ==
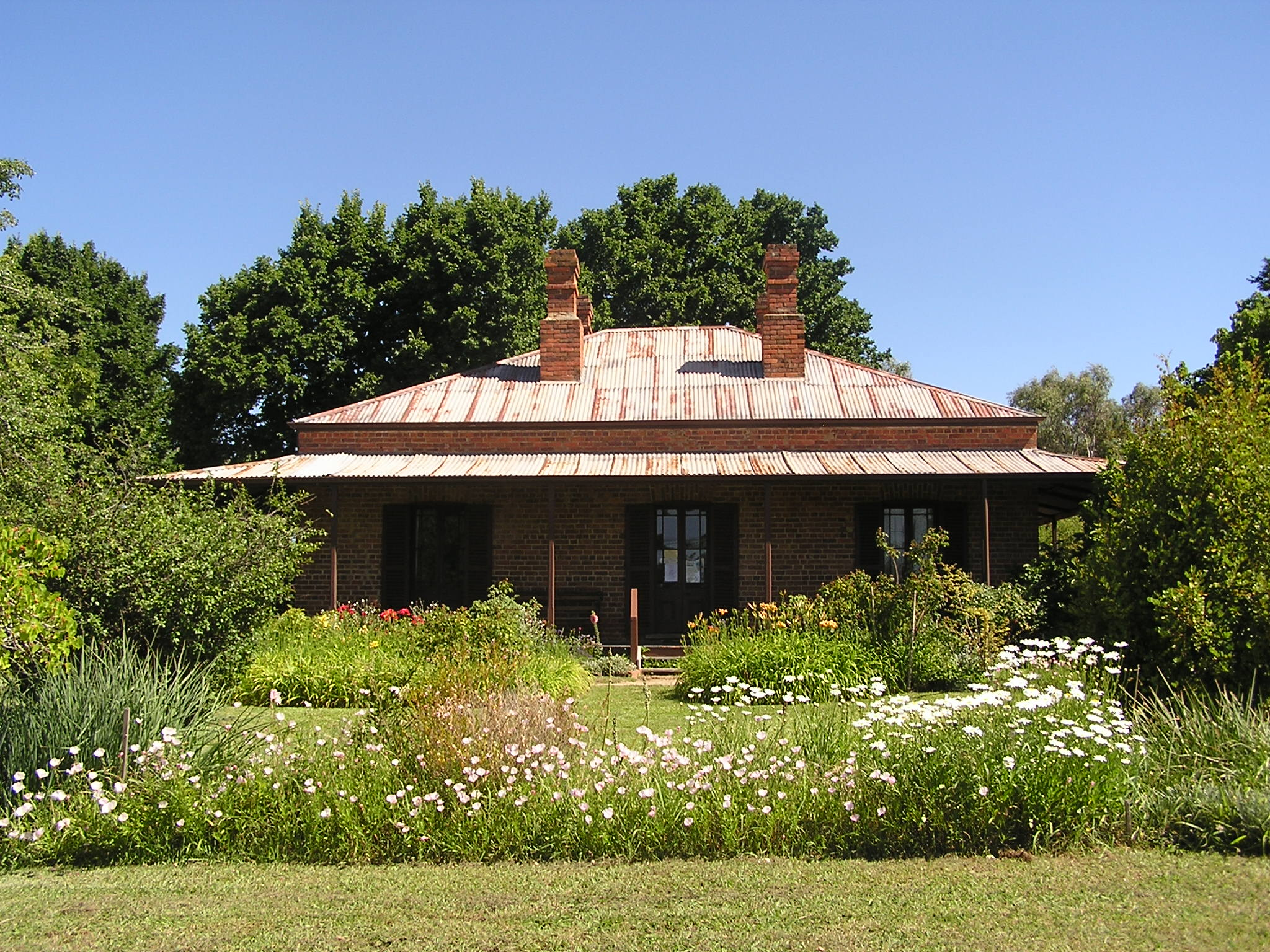
Lake View House at Chiltern, Victoria, the home of Henry Handel Richardson from July 1876 for 1½ years. Richardson's early years at Chiltern featured in the novel The Fortunes of Richard Mahony. The house was accepted by the National Trust of Australia in 1967.(ABC News story)

- Barwon Grange, Geelong
- Barwon Park, Winchelsea
- Como House, South Yarra
- Dow's Pharmacy, Chiltern
- Federal Standard Printing Works, Chiltern
- Government House, Melbourne (tours by appointment)
- Gulf Station, Yarra Glen
- Labassa, Caulfield
- Lake View Homestead, Chiltern
- La Trobe's Cottage, Melbourne
- McCrae Homestead, McCrae
- Polly Woodside, Melbourne
- Old Melbourne Gaol, Melbourne
- Mooramong, Skipton
- Mulberry Hill, Langwarrin South - donated to the Trust in 1984 on the death of Joan Lindsay. It is open to the public on weekends and some weekdays.
- Portable Iron Houses, South Melbourne
- Portarlington Mill, Portarlington
- Rippon Lea Estate, Elsternwick
- The Heights, Geelong

== Western Australia ==
- Bridgedale, Bridgetown
- Central Greenough
- East Perth Cemeteries, East Perth
- Ellensbrook, Yebble
- Goldfields Pipeline
- Mangowine Homestead, Nungarin
- No. 1 Pump Station, Mundaring
- Old Blythewood, Pinjarra
- Old Farm, Strawberry Hill, Albany
- Tranby House, Maylands
- Warden Finnerty's Residence, Coolgardie
- Wonnerup House and Old School, Busselton
- Woodbridge House, West Midland
- York Courthouse Complex, York

== See also ==
- Historic Houses Trust of New South Wales
