= National Trust of Australia =

Body of Australian heritage organisations

Australian Council of National Trusts
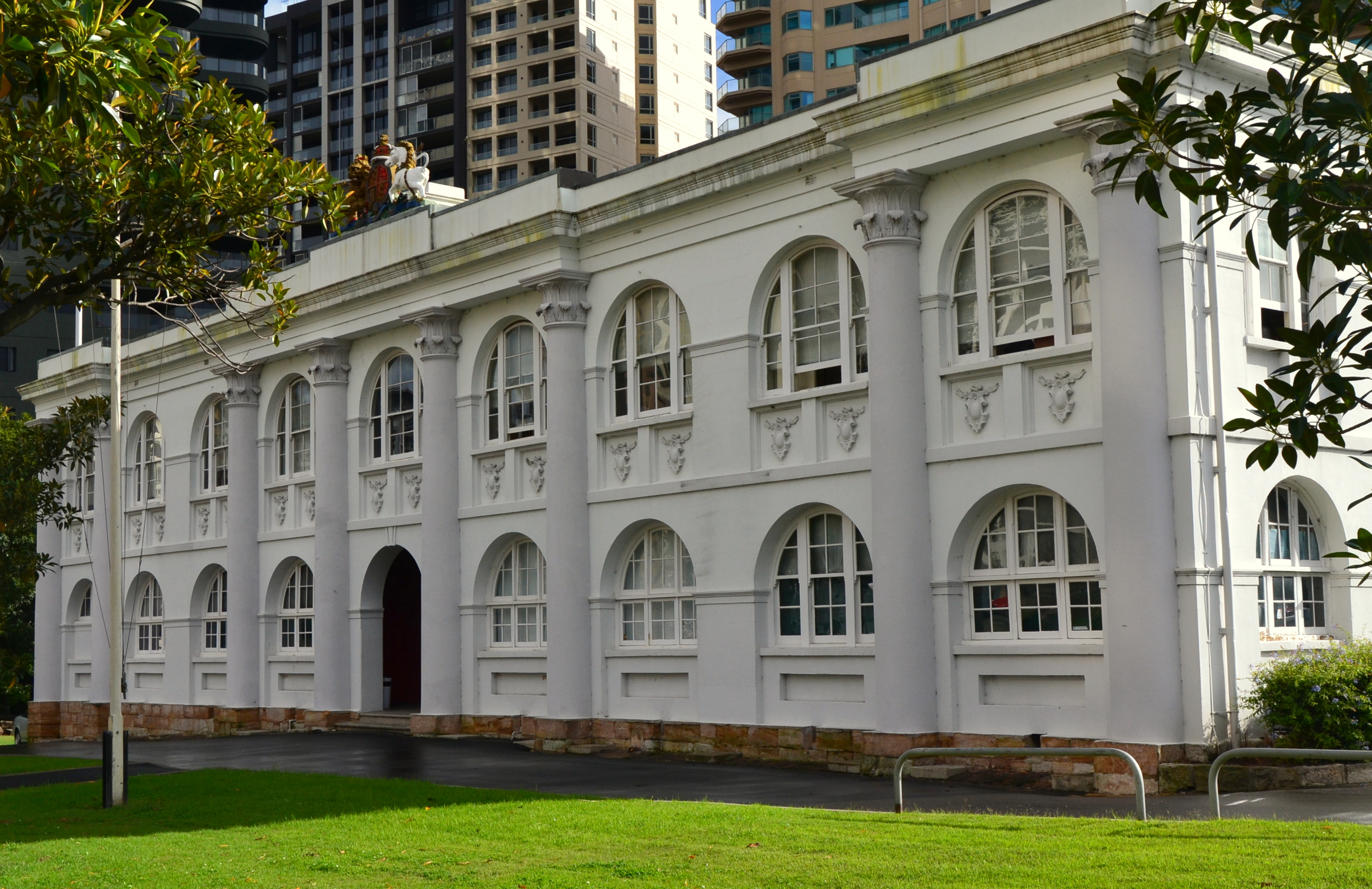
- National Trust building, Sydney
- Founded: 5 February 1965; 61 years ago
- Founder: Annie Forsyth Wyatt
- Type: National peak body for national trusts; public company, limited by guarantee
- VAT ID no.: ABN: 54 008 444 684
- Registration no.: ACN: 008 444 684
- Location: Canberra, Australia
- Region served: Australia
- Employees: 350
- Volunteers: 7,000
- Website: www.nationaltrust.org.au

The National Trust of Australia, officially the Australian Council of National Trusts (ACNT), is the Australian national peak body for community-based, non-government non-profit organisations committed to promoting and conserving Australia's Indigenous, natural and historic heritage. The umbrella body was incorporated in 1965, with member organisations in every state and territory of Australia.

== History ==
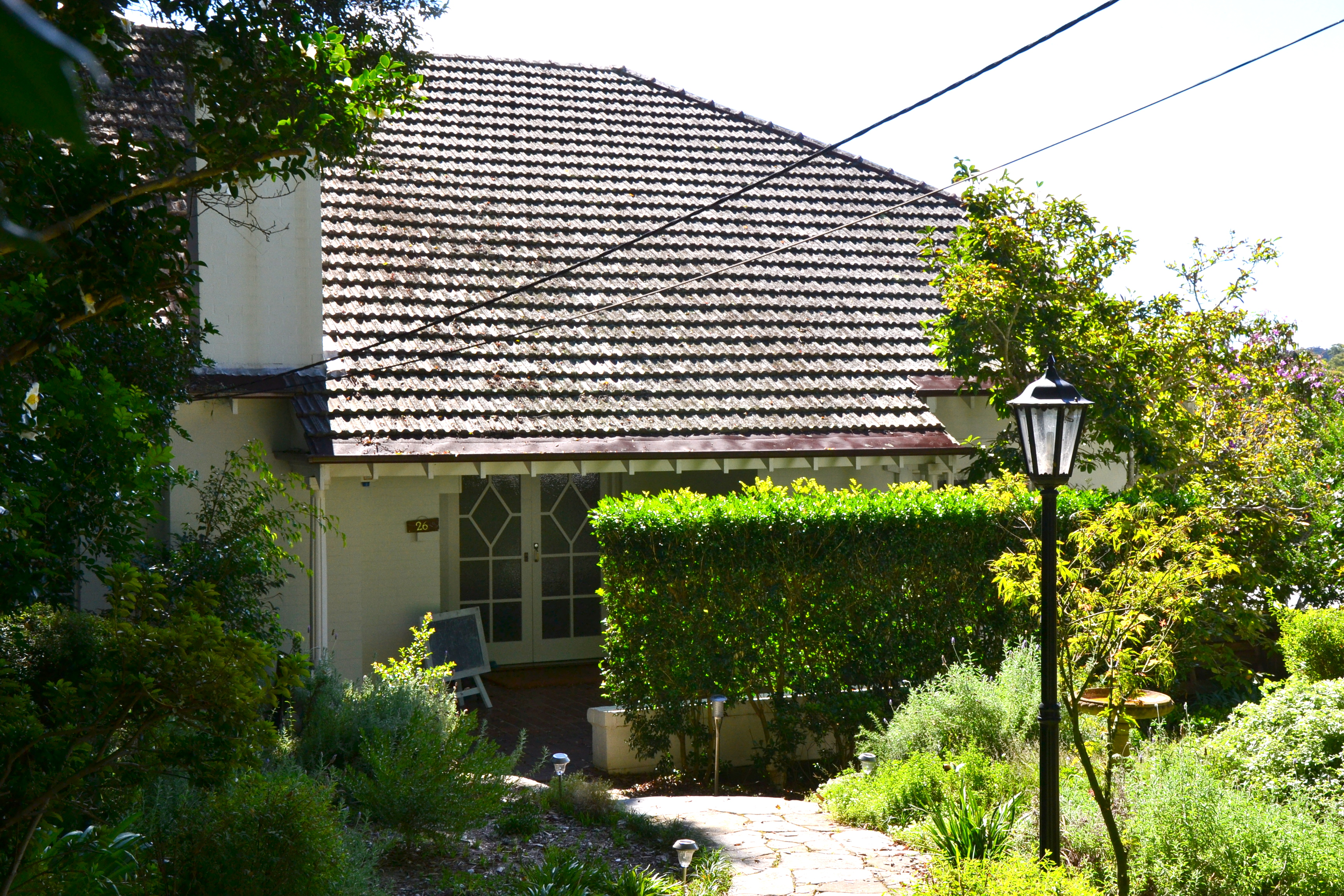
Annie Wyatt home, Gordon

Modelled on the National Trust for Places of Historic Interest or Natural Beauty and inspired by local campaigns to conserve native bushland and preserve old buildings, the first Australian National Trusts were formed in New South Wales in 1945, South Australia in 1955 and Victoria in 1956; followed later in Western Australia, Tasmania and Queensland. The two Territory Trusts were the last to be founded, in 1976 (see below).

The driving force behind the establishment of the National Trust in Australia was Annie Forsyth Wyatt (1885–1961). She lived for much of her life in a cottage in Gordon, New South Wales, which is still standing. She was living in the Sydney suburb of St Ives when she died.

The organisation was incorporated in 1965. The umbrella body federates the eight autonomous National Trusts in each Australian state and internal self-governing territory, providing them with a national secretariat and a national and international presence.

== Description ==
The trust is Australia's national peak body for community-based, non-government non-profit organisations committed to promoting and conserving Australia's Indigenous, natural and historic heritage.

Collectively, the constituent National Trusts own or manage over 300 heritage places (the majority held in perpetuity), and manage a volunteer workforce of 7,000 while also employing about 350 people nationwide, as of 2020. Around 1,000,000 visitors experience the properties and their collections in Australia each year.

== Constituent organisations ==
As of 2020, the National Trust's constituent organisations were:

Organisation	Jurisdiction	Founded	Properties		Website	Notes
Organisation	Jurisdiction	Founded	managed	owned	Website	Notes
ACT branch	ACT	1976	0	0	nationaltrust.org.au/act	
NSW branch	NSW	1947	18	38	nationaltrust.org.au/nsw	
NT branch	NT	1976	19	?	nationaltrust.org.au/nt	Founded by Adele Purvis, of Woodgreen Station
Qld branch	Qld	1963	?	?	nationaltrust.org.au/qld	
SA branch	SA	1955	120	120	nationaltrust.org.au/sa	
TAS branch	Tasmania	1960	9	9	nationaltrust.org.au/tas	
VIC branch	Victoria	1956	40	32	nationaltrust.org.au/vic	
WA branch	WA	1959	?	?	nationaltrust.org.au/wa	

=== NSW ===
Founded in 1947, the National Trust moved, in 1975, into the former Fort Street High School building on Observatory Hill, after the girls' school moved to Petersham to be reunited with the boys' school, which had moved in 1916. The distinctive building, which retains its appearance from the time of its conversion to a school in 1849, is visible from the approaches to the Sydney Harbour Bridge. The branch maintain of list of heritage properties that, unlike the New South Wales Heritage Register and the Australian National Heritage List, are not protected by law.

==== Properties ====
The Trust owns several properties on its register:

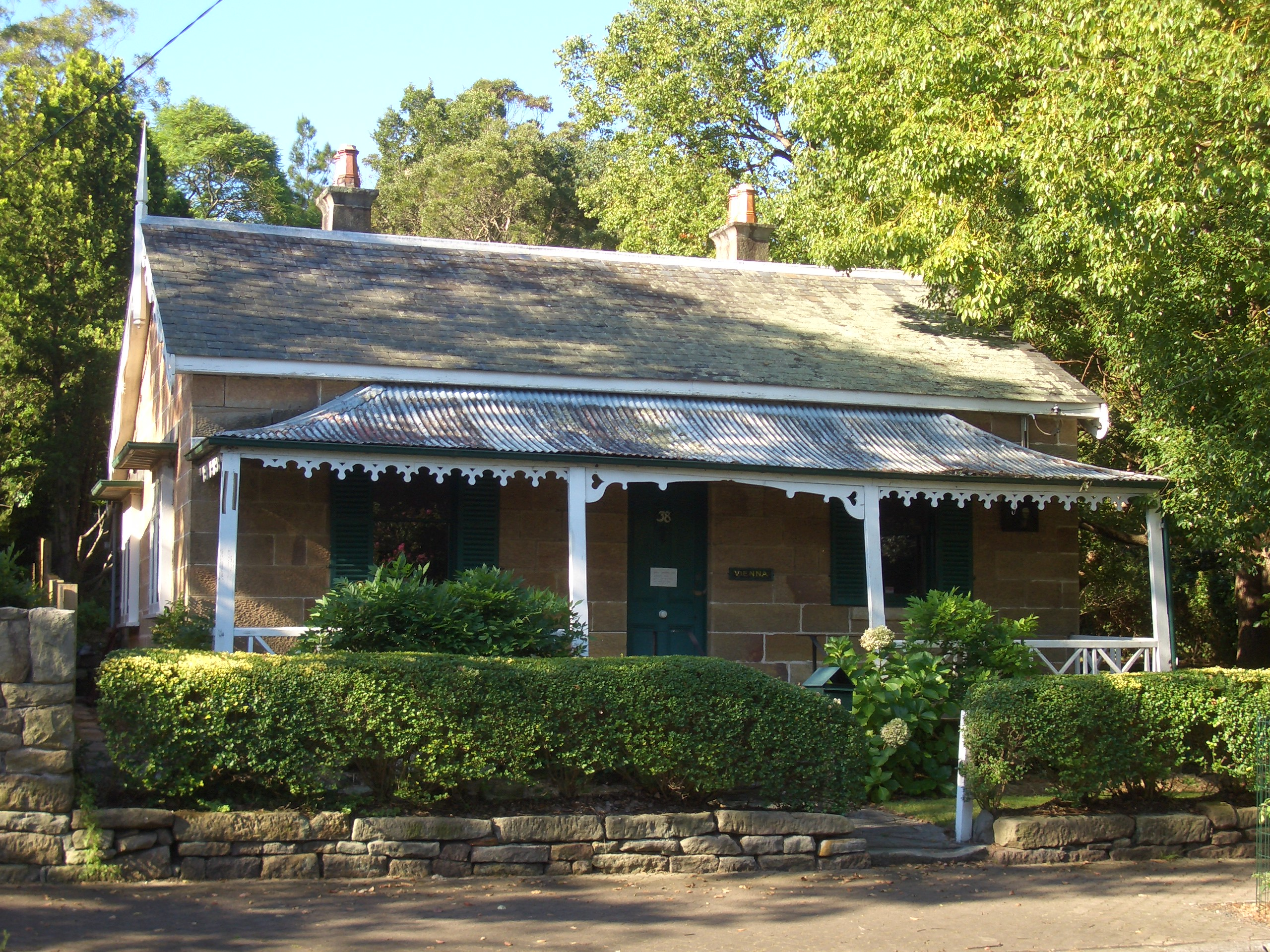
Vienna, Hunters Hill

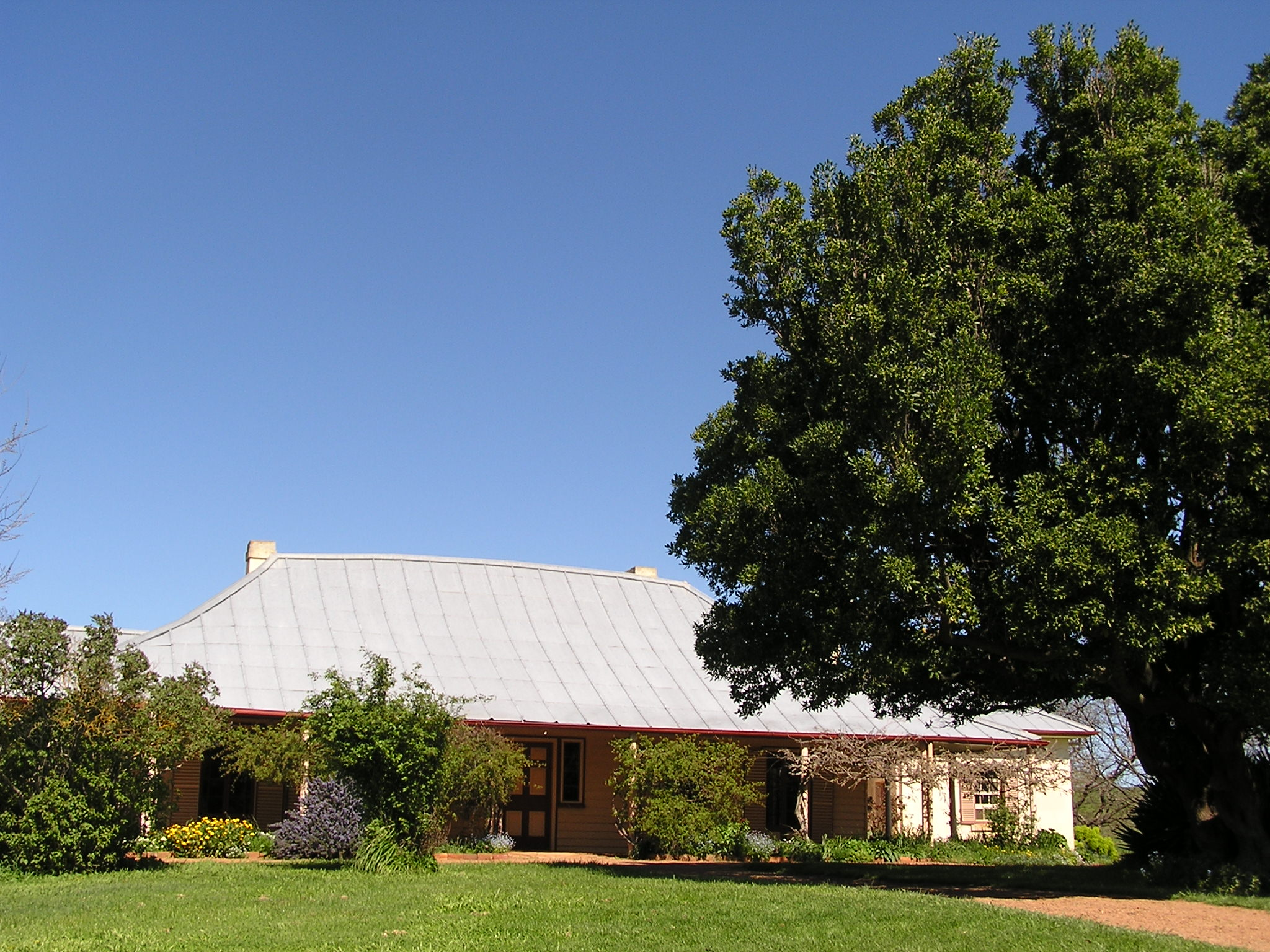
Cooma Cottage, Yass

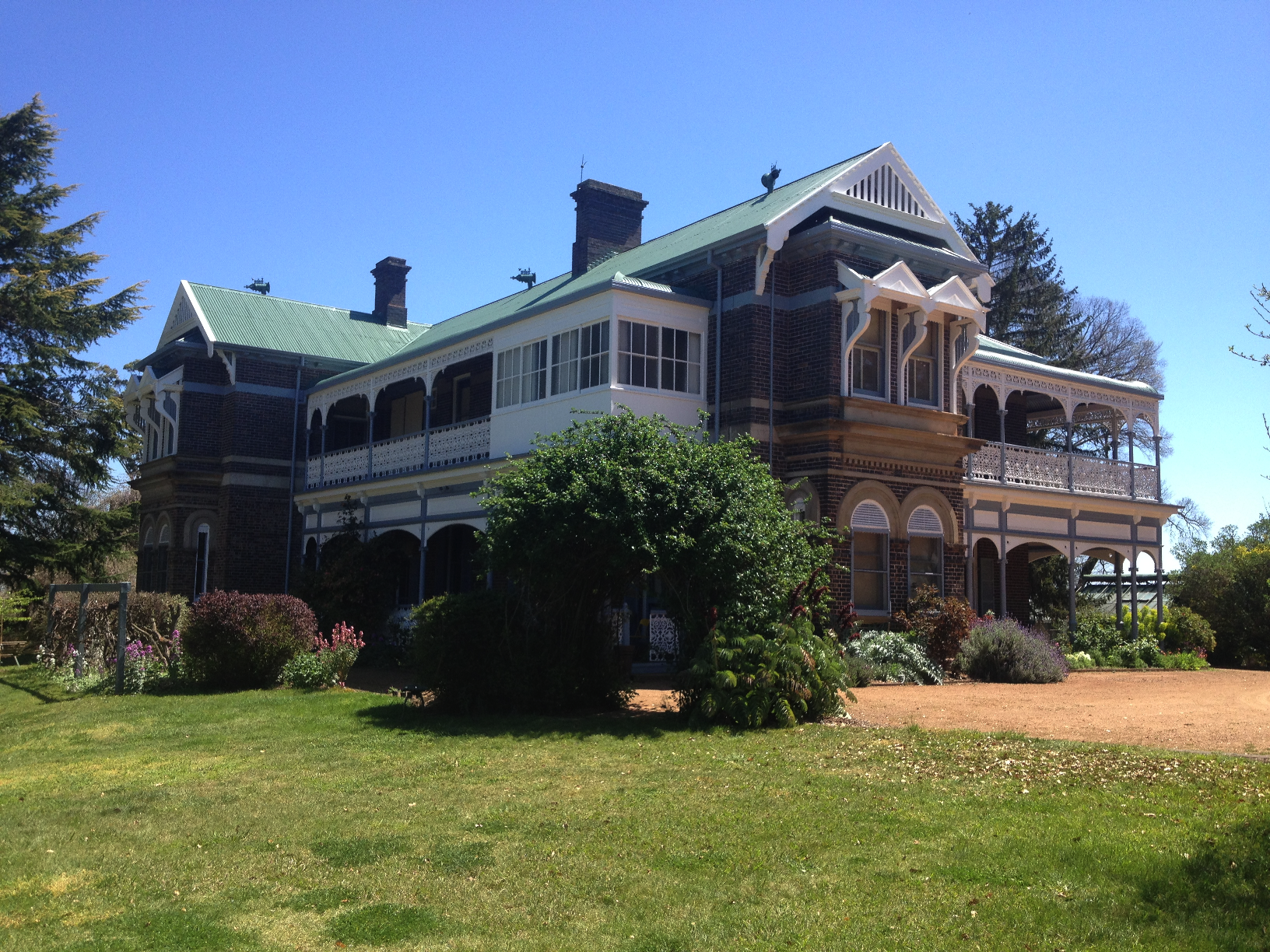
Saumarez Homestead, Armidale

- Ahimsa, Cheltenham
- Beatrice Bligh
- Bedervale, Braidwood (contents only)
- Clarence McKerihan
- Cooma Cottage, Yass
- Dalwood House, Branxton (grounds of Wyndham Estate)
- Dundullimal, Dubbo
- Everglades Gardens, Leura
- Experiment Farm Cottage, Harris Park
- Grossmann House and Brough House, Maitland
- Harper's Mansion, Berrima
- Lindesay, Darling Point
- Miss Porter's House, Newcastle
- Miss Traill's House & Garden, Bathurst
- Norman Lindsay Gallery, Faulconbridge
- Old Government House, Parramatta
- Retford Park, Bowral
- Riversdale, Goulburn
- Saumarez Homestead, Armidale
- S. H. Ervin Gallery, The Rocks
- St Ignatius Convent School, Wentworth (by appointment only)
- Sir Henry Parkes School of Arts, Tenterfield
- Tomago House, Tomago
- Vienna, Hunters Hill
- Wirrimbirra Sanctuary, between Tahmoor and Bargo
- Woodford Academy, Woodford

=== Northern Territory ===
The National Trust of the Northern Territory is a membership-based community organisation to "promote the natural, Indigenous and cultural heritage" of the Northern Territory. It was founded in 1976 by Adele Purvis, of Woodgreen Station. The branch maintain of list of heritage properties that, unlike the Northern Territory Heritage Register and the Australian National Heritage List, are not protected by law.

==== Properties ====
The Trust owns several notable properties on its register, including:

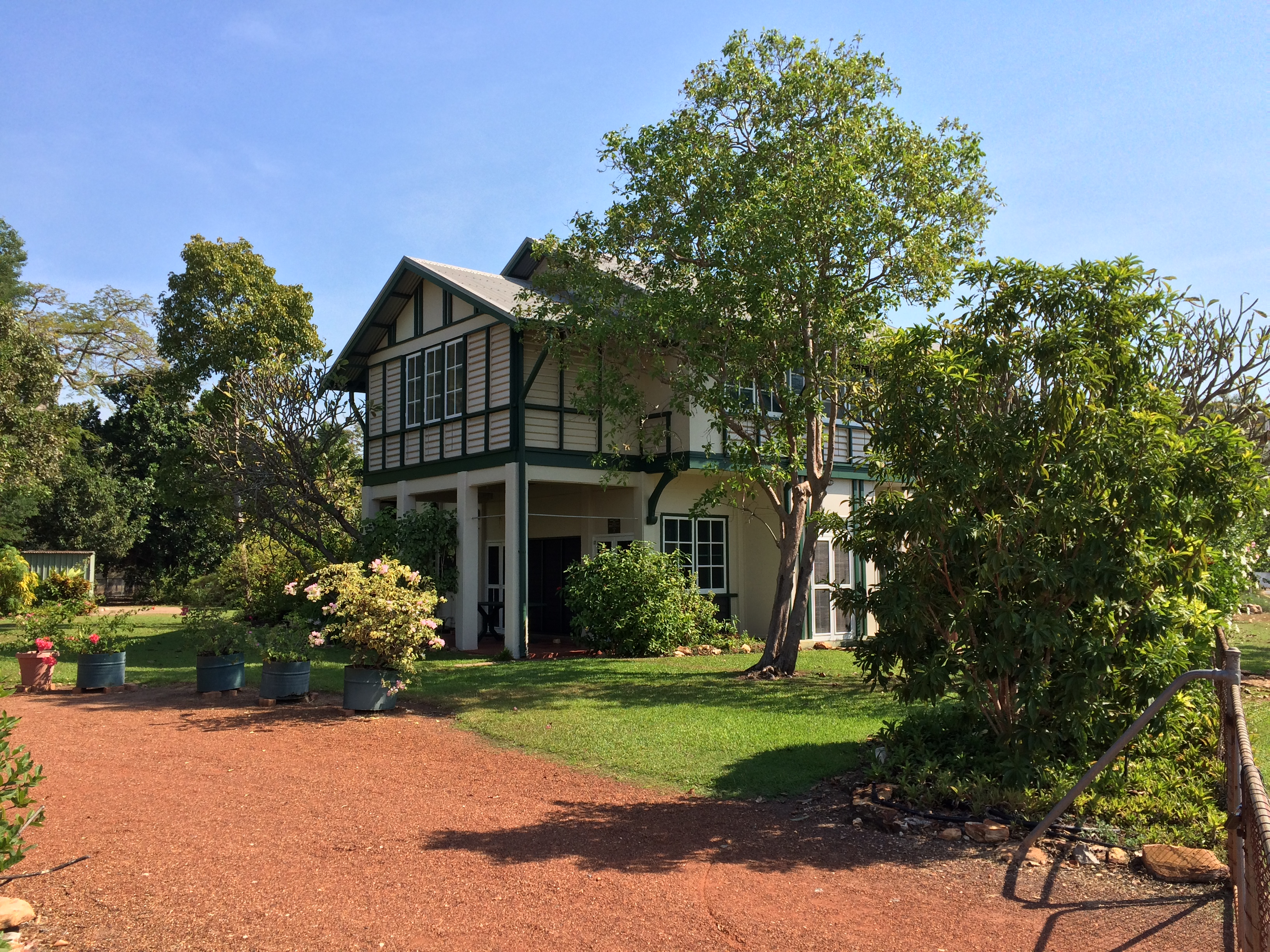
Burnett House at Myilly Point in Darwin

- Burnett House, Darwin
- Hartley Street School, Alice Springs
- Jones Store, Newcastle Waters
- Stuart Town Gaol, Alice Springs
- Pine Creek Railway Precinct, Pine Creek
- Tuxworth Fullwood House, Tennant Creek

=== South Australia ===
Founded in 1955, the National Trust of South Australia is a membership-based community organisation to "promote the natural, Indigenous and cultural heritage" of South Australia. The branch maintain of list of heritage properties that, unlike the South Australian Heritage Register and the Australian National Heritage List, are not protected by law.

==== Properties ====
The Trust owns several notable properties on its register, including:

- Ayers House, Adelaide - historic mansion on North Terrace, Adelaide, South Australia, named after former Premier Sir Henry Ayers. National Trust SA was granted the site as a 'home' for its museum in 1972 by Premier Don Dunstan.
- Beaumont House, Beaumont
- Cape Jaffa Lighthouse, Kingston SE
- Matta House, Kadina
- Olivewood, Renmark
- Port Pirie Railway Station and Customs House, Port Pirie
- Stangate House and Garden, Mount Lofty (by appointment only)

== See also ==
- List of National Trust properties in Australia
- Australian Living Treasures
- Society of Architectural Historians, Australia and New Zealand
- Heritage registers in Australia
- Historic Houses Trust of New South Wales
- Historical Society of the Northern Territory
