= Stangate House and Garden =

- Location within South Australia

General information
- Type: Historic house
- Location: 3 Edgeware Road; Aldgate, South Australia, Australia
- Coordinates: 35°0′56″S 138°43′55″E
- Construction started: 18 January 1940
- Completed: 30 June 1940
- Inaugurated: 1 July 1940
- Owner: National Trust of South Australia

Design and construction
- Architect: Eric McMichael

Website
- https://www.facebook.com/stangatehouse/

The Stangate House and Garden is a heritage-listed historic house in Aldgate, South Australia.

== History ==
Stangate House was first planned in London from 1937 to 1939 by Rev. Samuel Raymond Baron Cornish, the original owner. In January 1940, Adelaide architect Eric McMichael accepted the model and plans made by Rev. Cornish and started construction on the house on 18 January 1940. Rev. Cornish and his wife Gwyneth developed the Stangate garden and rerouted the creek to run through it.

In the 1960s or 1970s, Gwyneth bequeathed the property to the National Trust of South Australia. The Camellia Society of Adelaide Hills maintains the garden.

== Heritage listing ==
The property was heritage-listed on the South Australian Heritage Register with effect from 5 October 2000.

== See also ==
- List of National Trust properties in Australia
