= Federation of Australia =

Process of Australian unification

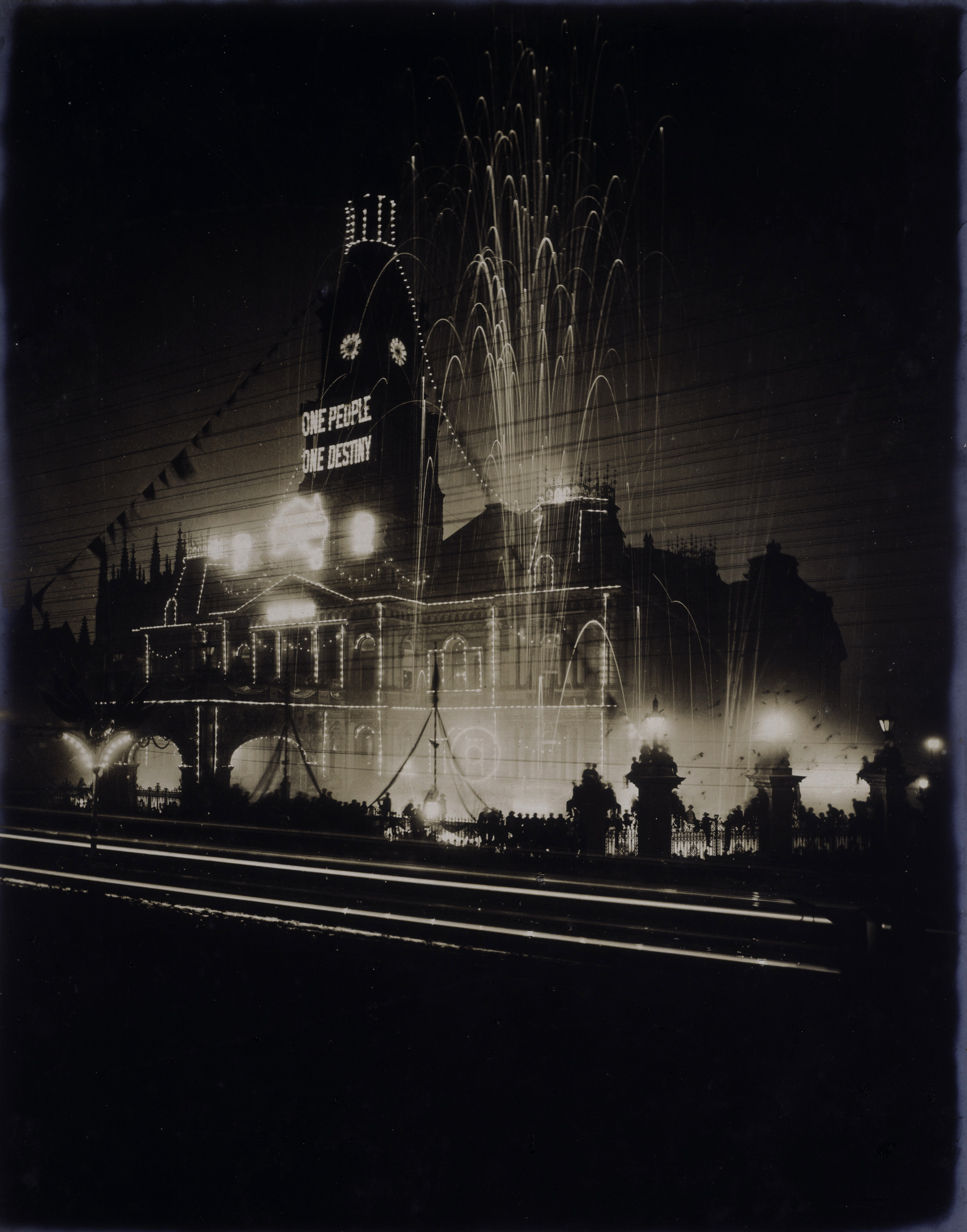
The Sydney Town Hall illuminated in celebratory lights and fireworks marking the Inauguration of the Commonwealth of Australia, 1901. The sign reads One people, one destiny.

The federation of Australia was the process by which the six separate British self-governing Australian colonies—New South Wales, Queensland, South Australia (which also governed what is now the Northern Territory), Tasmania, Victoria, and Western Australia—united to form the Commonwealth of Australia, establishing a system of federalism in Australia. The colonies of Fiji and New Zealand were originally part of this process, but they decided not to join the federation.

Following federation, the six colonies that united to form the Commonwealth of Australia as states kept the systems of government (and the bicameral legislatures) that they had developed as separate colonies, but they also agreed to have a federal government that was responsible for matters concerning the whole nation. When the Constitution of Australia came into force, on 1 January 1901, the colonies collectively became states of the Commonwealth of Australia.

The efforts to bring about federation in the mid-19th century were dogged by the lack of popular support for the movement. A number of conventions were held during the 1890s to develop a constitution for the Commonwealth. Sir Henry Parkes, Premier of the Colony of New South Wales, was instrumental in this process. Sir Edmund Barton, second only to Parkes in the length of his commitment to the federation cause, was the caretaker Prime Minister of Australia at the inaugural national election in March 1901. The election returned Barton as prime minister, though without a majority.

This period has lent its name to an architectural style prevalent in Australia at that time, known as Federation architecture, or Federation style.

== Early calls for federation ==
As early as 1842, an anonymous article in the South Australian Magazine called for a "Union of the Australasian Colonies into a Governor-Generalship."

In September 1846, the New South Wales Colonial Secretary Sir Edward Deas Thomson suggested federation in the New South Wales Legislative Council. The Governor of New South Wales, Sir Charles Fitzroy, then wrote to the United Kingdom's Colonial Office suggesting a "superior functionary" with power to review the legislation of all the colonies. In 1853, FitzRoy was appointed as Governor of Van Diemen's Land, South Australia and Victoria—a pre-federation governor-general of Australia, with wide-ranging powers to intervene in inter-colonial disputes. This title was also extended to his immediate successor, William Denison.

In 1847, the Secretary of State for the Colonies Earl Grey drew up a plan for a "General Assembly" of the colonies. The idea was quietly dropped. However, it prompted the statesman William Charles Wentworth to in 1848 propose the establishment of "a Congress from the various Colonial Legislatures" to legislate on "inter-colonial questions".

A few years later in 1853, a select committee formed by Wentworth to draft a new constitution for New South Wales endorsed a General Assembly of the Australian Colonies. This assembly was proposed to legislate on intercolonial matters, including tariffs, railways, lighthouses, penal settlements, gold and the mail. This was the first outline of the future Australian Commonwealth to be presented in an official colonial legislative report.

In 1857, Deas Thomson moved for a New South Wales Parliamentary Select Committee on the question of Australian federation. The committee reported in favour of a federal assembly being established, but the government changed in the meantime, and the question was shelved.

Also in 1857, in Britain, Wentworth founded the "General Association for the Australian Colonies", the object of which was to obtain a federal assembly for the whole of Australia. While in London, he produced a draft bill proposing a confederation of the Australian colonies, with each colony given equal representation in an intercolonial assembly, a proposal subsequently endorsed by his association. He further proposed a "permissive Act" be passed by Parliament allowing the colonies of Australia or any subset of them which was not a penal settlement to federate at will. Wentworth, hoping to garner as broad support as possible, proposed a loose association of the colonies, which was criticised by Robert Lowe. The secretary of state thereafter opted not to introduce the bill, assessing that it would probably lead to "dissension and discontent", distributing it nonetheless to the colonies for their responses. While there was in-principle support for a union of the colonies, the matter was ultimately deferred while New South Wales Premier Charles Cowper and Henry Parkes preferred to focus on liberalising Wentworth's squatter-friendly constitution.

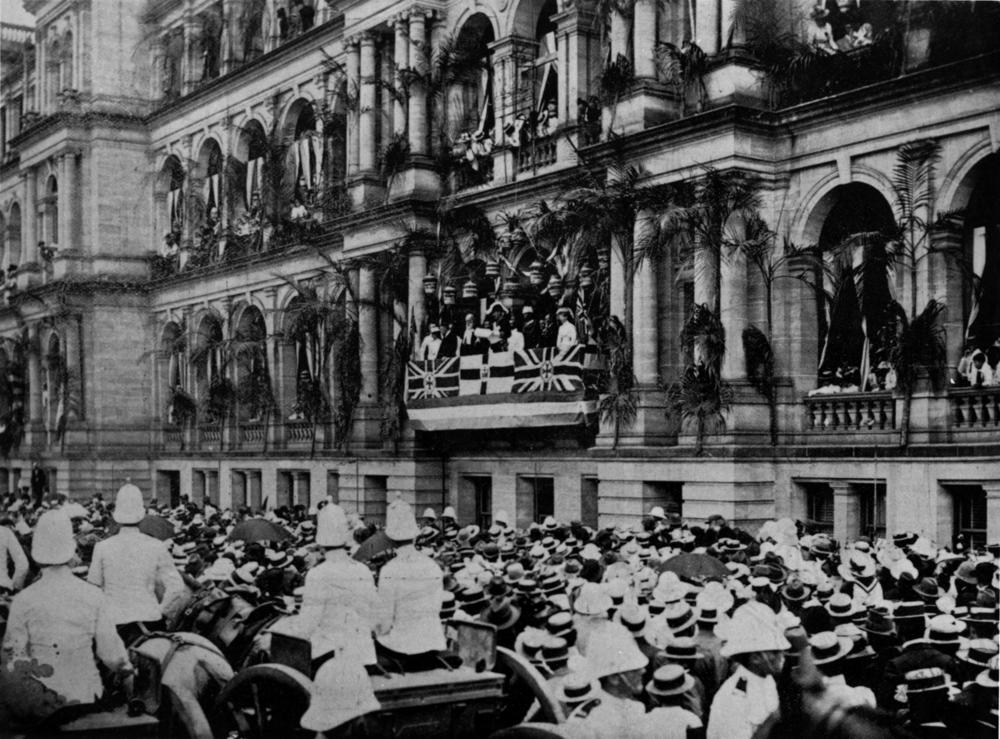
Governor of Queensland Lord Lamington reading the Queen's proclamation on Federation in Brisbane

=== Federal Council of Australasia ===
A serious movement for Federation of the colonies arose in the late 1880s, a time when there was increasing nationalism amongst Australians, the great majority of whom were born in the colonies. The idea of being Australian began to be celebrated in songs and poems. This was fostered by improvements in transport and communications, such as the establishment of a telegraph system between the colonies in 1872. The Australian colonies were also influenced by other federations that had emerged around the world, particularly the United States and Canada.

Sir Henry Parkes, then colonial secretary of New South Wales, first proposed a Federal Council body in 1867. After it was rejected by the British Secretary of State for the Colonies, the Duke of Buckingham, Parkes brought up the issue again in 1880, this time as the premier of New South Wales. At the conference, representatives from Victoria, New South Wales and South Australia considered a number of issues including federation, communication, Chinese immigration, vine diseases and uniform tariff rates. The Federation had the potential to ensure that throughout the continent, trade and interstate commerce would be unaffected by protectionism and measurement and transport would be standardised.

The final (and successful) push for a Federal Council came at an Intercolonial Convention in Sydney in November and December 1883. The trigger was the British rejection of Queensland's unilateral annexation of New Guinea and the British Government wish to see a federalised Australasia. The convention was called to debate the strategies needed to counter the activities of the German and French in New Guinea and in New Hebrides. Sir Samuel Griffith, the premier of Queensland, drafted a bill to constitute the Federal Council. The conference successfully petitioned the Imperial Parliament to enact the Federal Council of Australasia Act 1885.

As a result, a Federal Council of Australasia was formed, to represent the affairs of the colonies in their relations with the South Pacific islands. New South Wales and New Zealand did not join. The self-governing colonies of Queensland, Tasmania and Victoria, as well as the Crown Colonies of Western Australia and Fiji, became involved. South Australia was briefly a member between 1888 and 1890. The Federal Council had powers to legislate directly upon certain matters, and did so to effect the mutual recognition of naturalisations by colonies, to regulate labour standards in the employment of Pacific Island labour in fisheries, and to enable a legal suit to be served outside the colony in which it was issued, "a power valuable in matters ranging from absconding debtors to divorce proceedings". But the Council did not have a permanent secretariat, executive powers, or any revenue of its own. Furthermore, the absence of the powerful colony of New South Wales weakened its representative value.

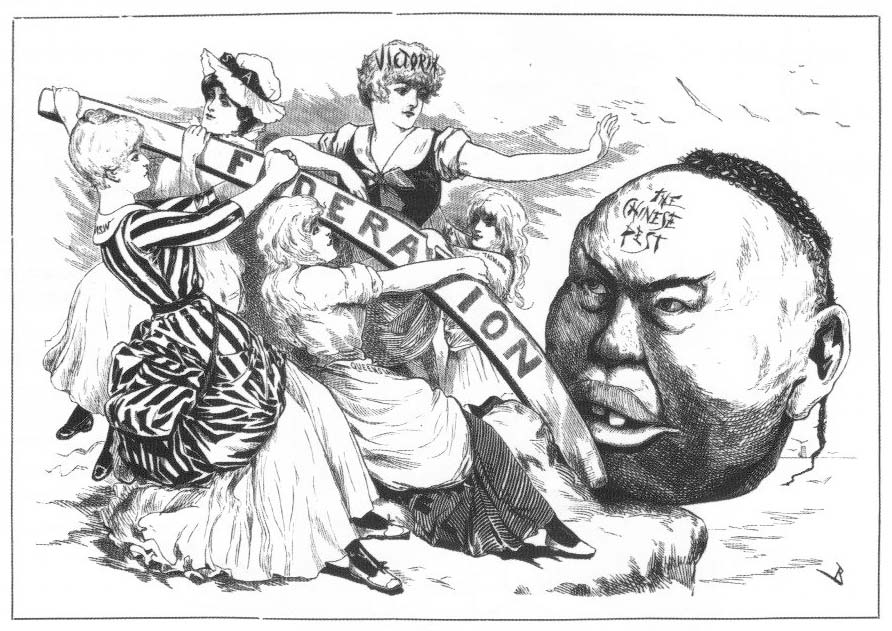
This 1888 political cartoon by the Melbourne Punch depicts the anti-Chinese racism in Australia which was one of the driving forces behind the push for federation.

Nevertheless, it was the first major form of inter-colonial co-operation. It provided an opportunity for Federalists from around the country to meet and exchange ideas. The means by which the council was established endorsed the continuing role that the Imperial Parliament would have in the development of Australia's constitutional structure. In terms of the Federal Council of Australia Act, the Australian drafters established a number of powers dealing with their common interests which would later be replicated in the Australian Constitution, especially section 51.

=== Early opposition ===
The individual colonies, except Victoria, were somewhat wary of Federation. Politicians, particularly those from the smaller colonies, disliked the very idea of delegating power to a national government; they feared that any such government would inevitably be dominated by the more populous New South Wales and Victoria. Queensland, for its part, worried that the advent of race-based national legislation would restrict the importing of kanaka labourers, thereby jeopardising its sugar cane industry.

These were not the only concerns of those resistant to federation. Smaller colonies also worried about the abolition of tariffs, which would deprive them of a large proportion of their revenue, and leave their commerce at the mercy of the larger states. New South Wales, traditionally free-trade in its outlook, wanted to be satisfied that the federation's tariff policy would not be protectionist. Victorian Premier James Service described fiscal union as "the lion in the way" of federation.

A further fundamental issue was how to distribute the excess customs duties from the central government to the states. For the larger colonies, there was the possibility (which never became an actuality) that they could be required to subsidise the struggling economies of Tasmania, South Australia and Western Australia.

Even without the concerns, there was debate about the form of government that a federation would take. Experience of other federations was less than inspiring. In particular, the United States had experienced its traumatic civil war.

The nascent Australian labour movement was less than wholly committed in its support for federation. On the one hand, nationalist sentiment was strong within the labour movement and there was much support for the idea of White Australia. On the other hand, labour representatives feared that federation would distract attention from the need for social and industrial reform, and further entrench the power of the conservative forces. The federal conventions included no representatives of organised labour. In fact, the proposed federal constitution was criticised by labour representatives as being too conservative. These representatives wanted to see a federal government with more power to legislate on issues such as wages and prices. They also regarded the proposed senate as much too powerful, with the capacity to block attempts at social and political reform, much as the colonial upper houses were quite openly doing at that time.

Religious factors played a small but not trivial part in disputes over whether federation was desirable or even possible. As a general rule, pro-federation leaders were Protestants, while Catholics' enthusiasm for federation was much weaker, not least because Parkes had been militantly anti-Catholic for decades (and because the labour movement was disproportionately Catholic in its membership). For all that, many Irish could feel an attractive affinity between the cause of Home Rule in Ireland—effectively federalizing the United Kingdom—and the federation of the Australian colonies. Federationists such as Edmund Barton, with the full support of his righthand man Richard O'Connor, were careful to maintain good relations with Irish opinion.

== Early constitutional conventions ==
In the early 1890s, two meetings established the need for federation and set the framework for this to occur. An informal meeting attended by official representatives from the Australasian colonies was held in 1890. This led to the first National Australasian Convention, meeting in Sydney in 1891. New Zealand was represented at both the conference and the convention, although its delegates indicated that it would be unlikely to join the Federation at its foundation, but it would probably be interested in doing so at a later date.

=== Australasian Federal Conference of 1890 ===
The Australasian Federal Conference of 1890 met at the instigation of Parkes. Accounts of its origin commonly commence with Lord Carrington, the Governor of New South Wales, goading the ageing Parkes at a luncheon on 15 June 1889. Parkes reportedly boasted that he "could confederate these colonies in twelve months". Carrington retorted, "Then why don't you do it? It would be a glorious finish to your life." Parkes the next day wrote to the Premier of Victoria, Duncan Gillies, offering to advance the cause of Federation. Gillies's response was predictably cool, given the reluctance of Parkes to bring New South Wales into the Federal Council. In October Parkes travelled north to Brisbane and met with Griffith and Sir Thomas McIlwraith. On the return journey, he stopped just south of the colonial border, and delivered the historic Tenterfield Oration on 24 October 1889 in Tenterfield's School of Arts, stating that the time had come for the colonies to consider Australian federation.

Through the latter part of 1889, the premiers and governors corresponded and agreed for an informal meeting to be called. The membership was: New South Wales, Parkes (Premier) and William McMillan (Colonial Treasurer); Victoria, Duncan Gillies (Premier) and Alfred Deakin (Chief Secretary); Queensland, Sir Samuel Griffith (Leader of the Opposition) and John Murtagh Macrossan (Colonial Secretary); South Australia, Dr. John Cockburn (Premier) and Thomas Playford (Leader of the Opposition); Tasmania, Andrew Inglis Clark (Attorney-General) and Stafford Bird (Treasurer); Western Australia, Sir James George Lee Steere (Speaker); New Zealand, Captain William Russell (Colonial Secretary) and Sir John Hall.

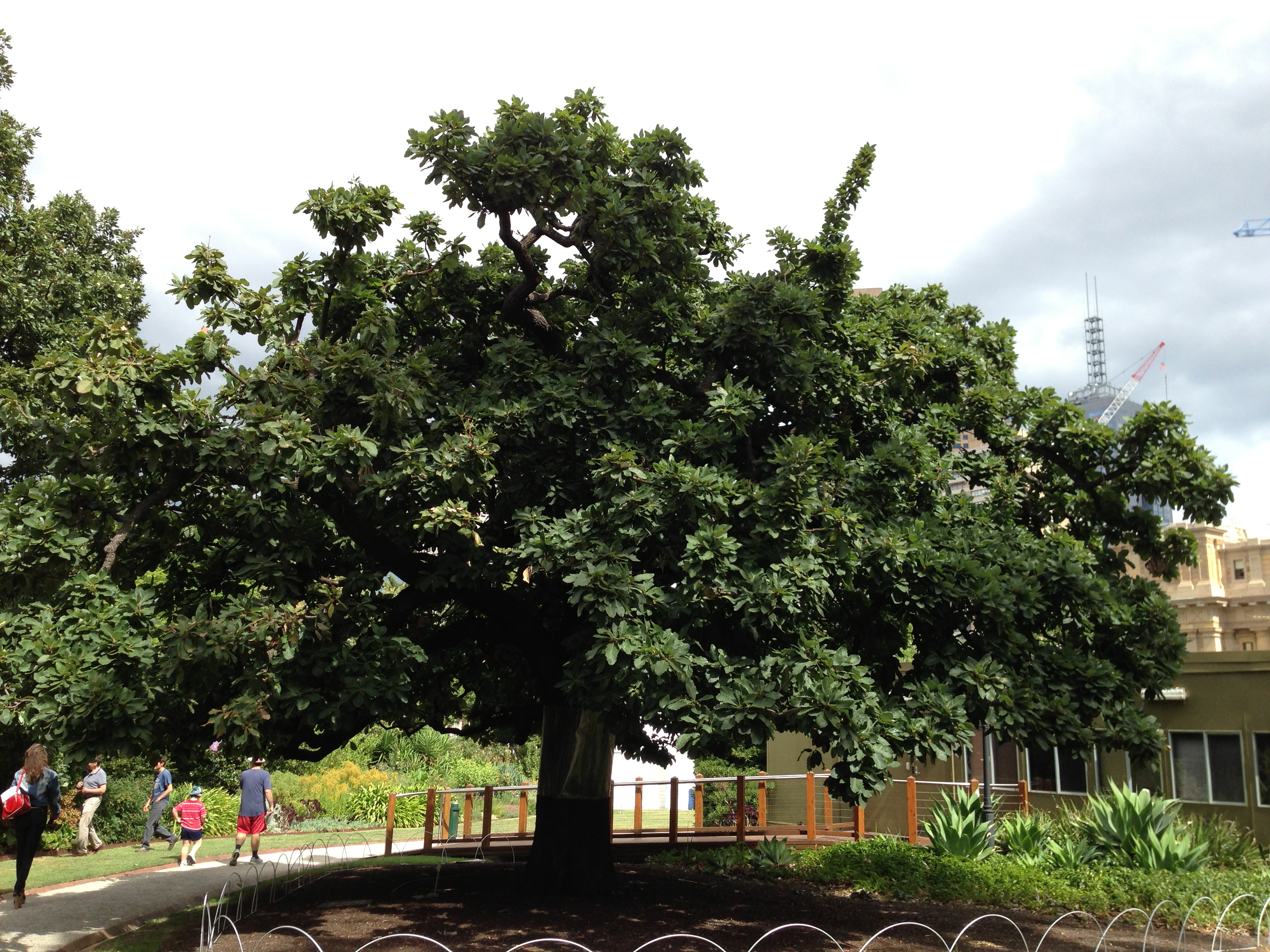
The Federal Oak in the gardens of the Victorian Parliament House in Melbourne. The tree was planted in 1890 by Sir Henry Parkes to commemorate the meeting of the Australian Federal Conference.

When the conference met at the Victorian Parliament in Melbourne on 6 February, the delegates were confronted with a scorching summer maximum temperature of 39.7 °C (103.5 °F) in the shade. The Conference debated whether or not the time was ripe to proceed with federation.

While some of the delegates agreed it was, the smaller states were not as enthusiastic. Thomas Playford from South Australia indicated the tariff question and lack of popular support as hurdles. Similarly, Sir James Lee Steere from Western Australia and the New Zealand delegates suggested there was little support for federation in their respective colonies.

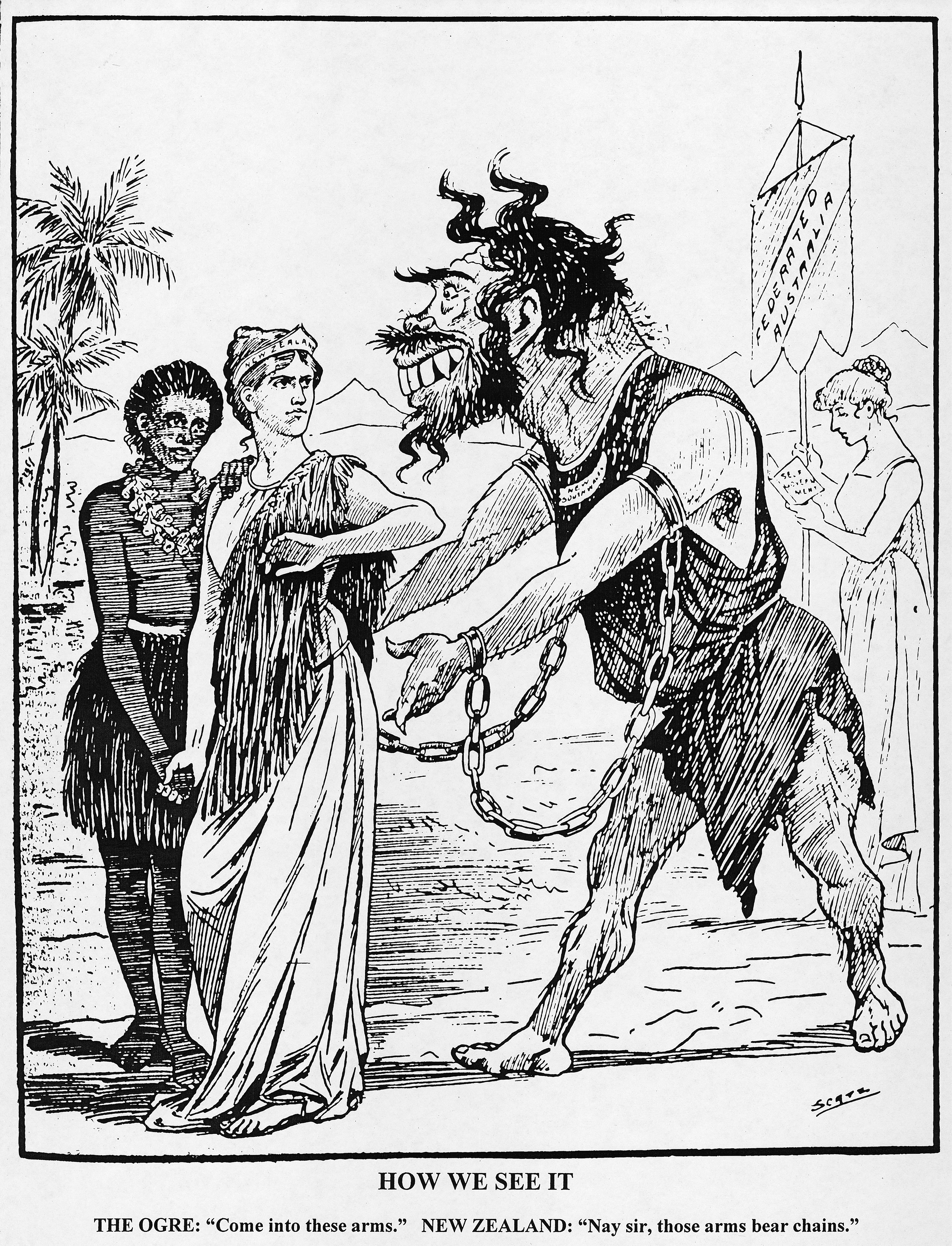
Political cartoon from 1900 that shows the colonies of New Zealand and Fiji rejecting the offer to join the Federation, with Zealandia referencing Australia's origins as a penal colony

A basic question at this early assembly was how to combine federalism and responsible government. Parkes suggested the Canadian model, which federated with the British North America Act, 1867, to be similarly adopted in Australia. However, delegates from the smaller states were not enthusiastic, with John Alexander Cockburn of South Australia seeing the Canadian model as a "coercive" and "homogeneous National Union". Andrew Inglis Clark, a long-time admirer of American federal institutions, introduced the US Constitution as an example of the protection of States' rights. He presented it as an alternative to the Canadian model, arguing that Canada was "an instance of amalgamation rather than Federation." A model closer to that of the United States was endorsed, with states able to act completely independently apart from those limited powers transferred to the federal government and where each state would be represented equally in a strong second chamber—the Senate.

=== Clark's draft constitution ===
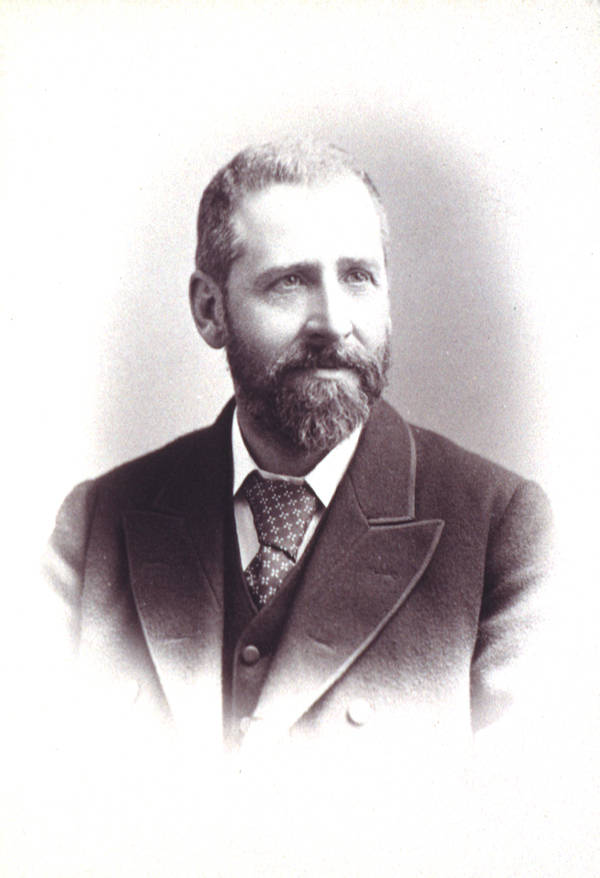
Andrew Inglis Clark, c. 1907

Andrew Inglis Clark had given considerable thought towards a suitable constitution for Australia. In May 1890, he travelled to London to conduct an appeal on behalf of the Government of Tasmania before the Privy Council. During this trip, he began writing a draft constitution, taking the main provisions of the British North America Act, 1867 and its supplements up through 1890, the US Constitution, the Federal Council of Australasia Act, and various Australian colonial constitutions. Clark returned from London by way of Boston, Massachusetts, where he held discussions about his draft with Oliver Wendell Holmes Jr., and Moncure Conway among others. (Note: Clark, Conway and Holmes were all Unitarians. Clark had met Conway when he travelled to Hobart, Tasmania, as part of his speaking tour in 1883. Conway later introduced Clark to Holmes.)

Clark's draft introduced the nomenclature and form which was subsequently adopted:

- The Australian Federation is described as the Commonwealth of Australia
- There are three separate and equal branches: the Parliament, the Executive, and the Judicature.
- The Legislature consists of a House of Representatives and a Senate
- It specified the separation of powers and the division of powers between the Federal and State governments.

Upon his return to Hobart in early November 1890, with the technical aid of W. O. Wise, the Tasmanian Parliamentary Draftsman, Clark completed the final form of the Draft Constitution and had a number of copies printed. In February 1891, Clark circulated copies of his draft to Parkes, Barton and probably Playford as well. This draft was always intended to be a private working document, and was never published.

=== The National Australasian Convention of 1891 ===
The Parliament proposed at the Convention of 1891 was to adopt the nomenclature of the United States Congress; a House of Representatives and a Senate. The House of Representatives was to be elected by districts drawn up on the basis of their population, while in the Senate there was to be equal representation for each "province". This American model was mixed with the Westminster system by which the Prime Minister and other ministers would be appointed by the representative of the British Crown from among the members of the political party holding a majority in the lower House.

Griffith identified with great clarity at the Sydney Convention perhaps the greatest problem of all: how to structure the relationship between the lower and upper houses within the Federal Parliament. The main division of opinion centred on the contention of Alfred Deakin, that the lower house must be supreme, as opposed to the views of Barton, John Cockburn and others, that a strong Senate with co-ordinate powers was essential. Griffith himself recommended that the doctrine of responsible government should be left open, or substantially modified to accord with the Federal structure.

Over the Easter weekend in 1891, Griffith edited Clark's draft aboard the Queensland Government's steam yacht Lucinda. (Clark was not present, as he was ill with influenza in Sydney). Griffith's draft Constitution was submitted to colonial parliaments but it lapsed in New South Wales, after which the other colonies were unwilling to proceed.

=== Griffith or Clark? ===
The importance of the draft Constitution of 1891 was recognised by John La Nauze when he flatly declared that "The draft of 1891 is the Constitution of 1900, not its father or grandfather." In the twenty-first century, however, a lively debate has sprung up as to whether the principal credit for this draft belongs to Queensland's Sir Samuel Griffith or Tasmania's Andrew Inglis Clark. The debate began with the publication of Peter Botsman's The Great Constitutional Swindle: A Citizen's Guide to the Australian Constitution in 2000, and a biography of Andrew Inglis Clark by F.M. Neasey and L.J. Neasey published by the University of Tasmania Law Press in 2001.

The traditional view attached almost sole responsibility for the 1891 draft to Griffith. Quick and Garran, for instance, state curtly that Griffith "had the chief hand in the actual drafting of the Bill". Given that the authors of this highly respected work were themselves active members of the federal movement, it may be presumed that this view represents—if not the complete truth—then, at least, the consensus opinion among Australia's "founding fathers".

In his 1969 entry on "Clark, Andrew Inglis (1848–1907)" for the Australian Dictionary of Biography, Henry Reynolds offers a more nuanced view:

Before the National Australasian Convention in Sydney in 1891 [Clark] circulated his own draft constitution bill. This was practically a transcript of relevant provisions from the British North American Act, the United States Constitution and the Federal Council Act, arranged systematically, but it was to be of great use to the drafting committee at the convention. Parkes received it with reservations, suggesting that "the structure should be evolved bit by bit". George Higinbotham admitted the "acknowledged defects & disadvantages" of responsible government, but criticized Clark's plan to separate the executive and the legislature. Clark's draft also differed from the adopted constitution in his proposal for "a separate federal judiciary", with the new Supreme Court replacing the Privy Council as the highest court of appeal on all questions of law, which would be "a wholesome innovation upon the American system". He became a member of the Constitutional Committee and chairman of the Judiciary Committee. Although he took little part in the debates he assisted (Sir) Samuel Griffith, (Sir) Edmund Barton and Charles Cameron Kingston in revising Griffith's original draft of the adopted constitution on the Queensland government's steam yacht, Lucinda; though he was too ill to be present when the main work was done, his own draft had been the basis for most of Griffith's text.

Clark's supporters are quick to point out that 86 Sections (out of a total of 128) of the final Australian Constitution are recognisable in Clark's draft, and that "only eight of Inglis Clark's ninety-six clauses failed to find their way into the final Australian Constitution"; but these are potentially misleading statistics. As Professor John Williams has pointed out:

It is easy to point to the document and dismiss it as a mere "cut and paste" from known provisions. While there is some validity in such observations it does tend to overlook the fact that there are very few variations to be added once the basic structure is agreed. So for instance, there was always going to be parts dealing with the executive, the parliament and the judiciary in any Australian constitution. The fact that Inglis Clark modelled his on the American Constitution is no surprise once that basic decision was made. Issues of the respective legislative powers, the role of the states, the power of amendment and financial questions were the detail of the debate that the framers were about to address in 1891.

As to who was responsible for the actual detailed drafting, as distinct from the broad structure and framework of the 1891 draft, John Williams (for one) is in no doubt:

In terms of style there can be little argument that Inglis Clark's Constitution is not as crisp or clean as Kingston's 1891 draft Constitution. This is not so much a reflection on Inglis Clark, but an acknowledgement of the talents of Charles Kingston and Sir Samuel Griffith as drafters. They were direct and economical with words. The same cannot always be said of Inglis Clark.

== Australasian Federal Convention of 1897–98 ==
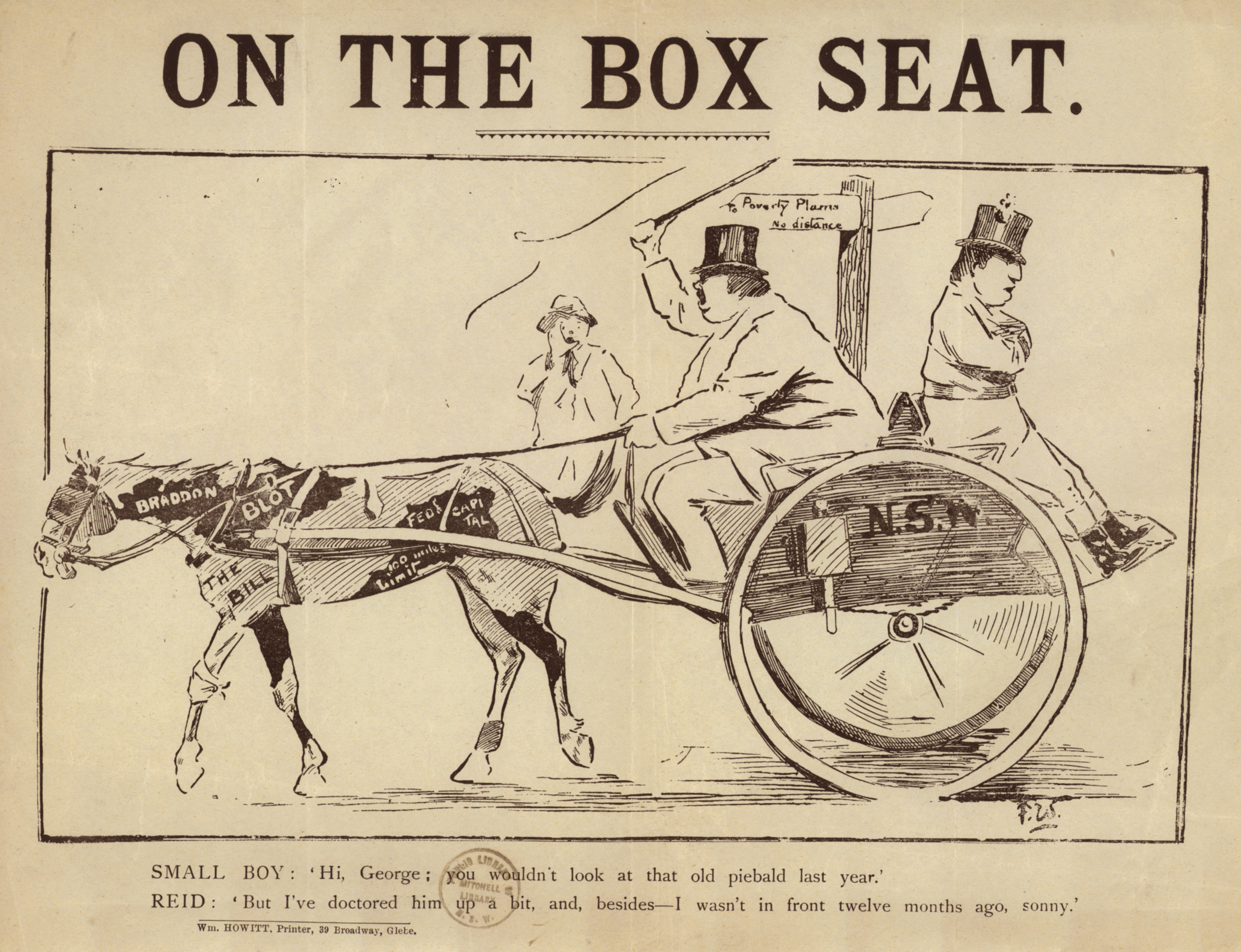
On the box seat, cartoon on Mr Reid and the federal premiership, 1899

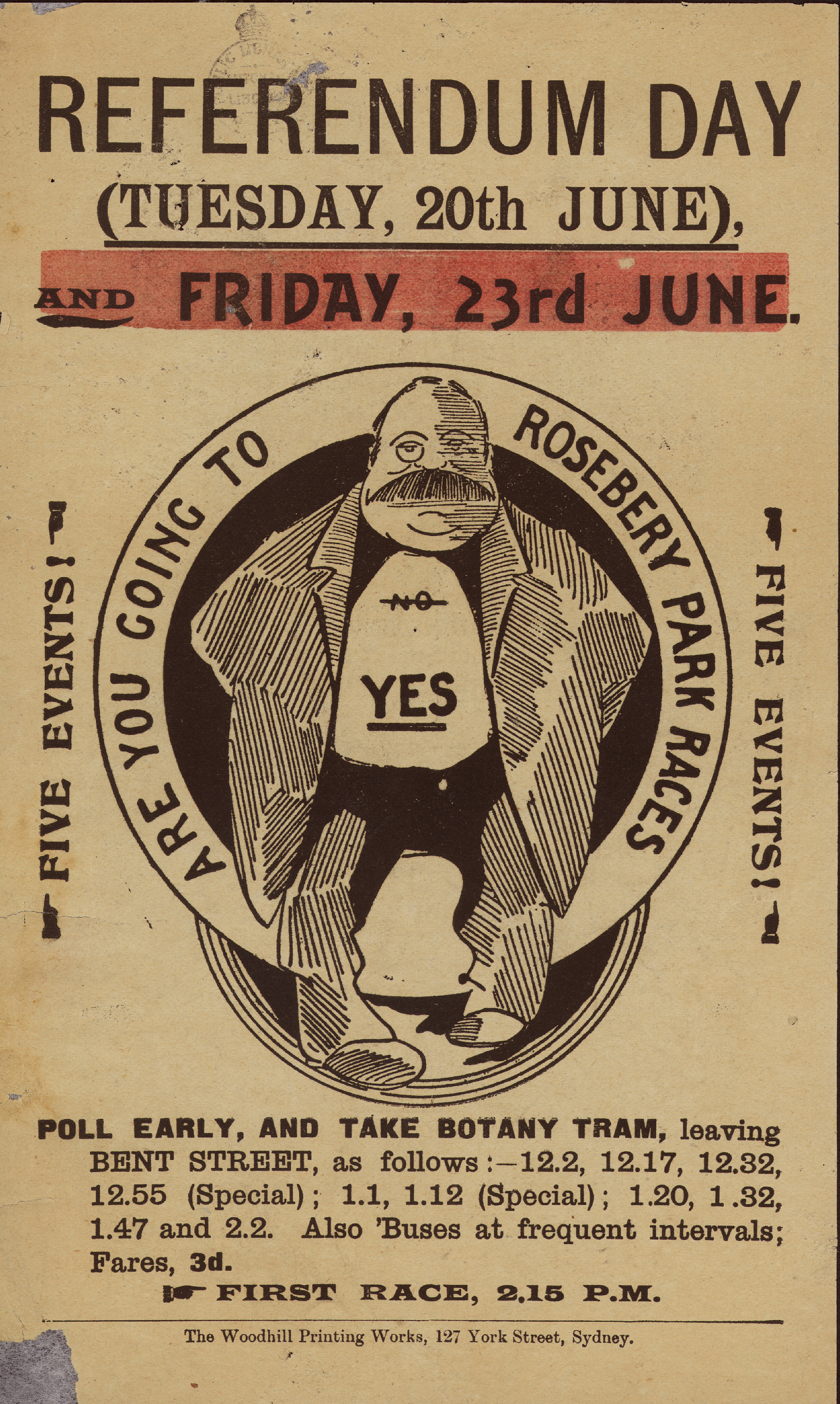
Handbill for Referendum Day (Tuesday 20 June), and Friday 23 June 1899

The apparent enthusiasm of 1891 rapidly ebbed in the face of opposition from Henry Parkes' rival, George Reid, and the sudden advent of the Labor Party in New South Wales, which commonly dismissed federation as a "fad". The subsequent revival of the federal movement owed much to the growth of federal leagues outside of capital cities, and, in Victoria, the Australian Natives' Association. The Border Federation League of Corowa held a conference in 1893 which was to prove of considerable significance, and a "People's Convention" in Bathurst in 1896 underlined the cautious conversion of George Reid to the federal cause. At the close of the Corowa Conference John Quick had advanced a scheme of a popularly elected convention, tasked to prepare a constitution, which would then be put to a referendum in each colony. Winning the support of George Reid, premier of New South Wales from 1894, the Quick scheme was approved by all premiers in 1895. (Quick and Robert Garran later published The Annotated Constitution of the Australian Commonwealth in 1901, which is widely regarded as one of the most authoritative works on the Australian Constitution.) In March 1897 took place the Australasian Federal Convention Elections, and several weeks later the delegates gathered for the convention's first session in Adelaide, later meeting in Sydney, and finally in Melbourne in March 1898. After the Adelaide meeting, the colonial parliaments took the opportunity to debate the emerging bill and to suggest changes. The basic principles of the 1891 draft constitution were adopted, modified by a consensus for more democracy in the constitutional structure. It was agreed that the Senate should be chosen, directly, by popular vote, rather than appointed by state governments.

On other matters there was considerable disagreement. State interests inevitably fractured the unity of delegates in matters involving rivers and railways, producing legalistic compromises. And they had few guides, at a conceptual level, to what they were doing. Deakin greatly praised James Bryce's appreciation of American federalism, The American Commonwealth. And Barton cited the analysis of federation of Bryce's Oxford colleagues, E.A. Freeman and A.V. Dicey. But neither of these two writers could be said to be actual advocates of Federation. For delegates less given to reading (or citing) authors, the great model of plural governance would always be the British Empire, which was not a federation.

The Australasian Federal Convention dissolved on 17 March 1898 having adopted a bill "To Constitute the Commonwealth of Australia."

== Federation referendums ==
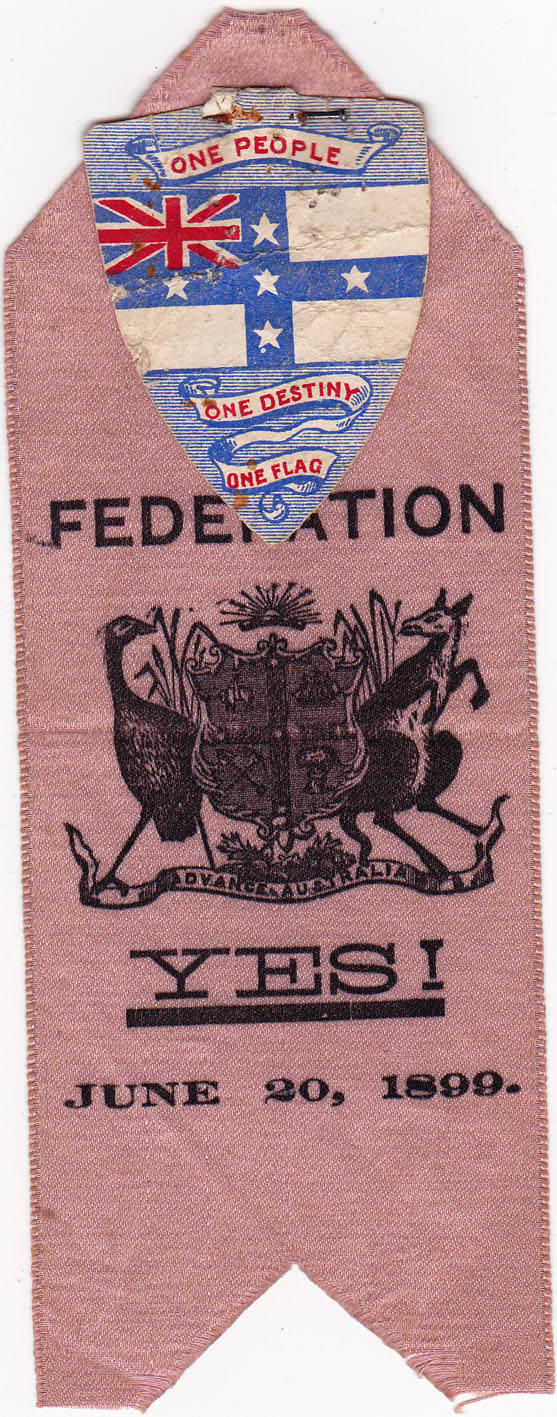
A ribbon produced in Sydney

Referendums on the proposed constitution were held in four of the colonies in June 1898. There were majority votes in all four, however, the enabling legislation in New South Wales required the support of at least 80,000 voters for passage, equivalent to about half of enrolled voters, and this number was not reached. A meeting of the colonial premiers in early 1899 agreed to a number of amendments to make the constitution more acceptable to New South Wales. These included limiting the Braddon Clause, which guaranteed the states 75 percent of customs revenue, to just ten years of operation; requiring that the new federal capital would be located in New South Wales, but at least a hundred miles (160 km) distant from Sydney; and, in the circumstances of a double dissolution, reducing from six tenths to one half the requisite majority to legislate of a subsequent joint meeting of Senate and House. In June 1899, referendums on the revised constitution were held again in all the colonies except for Western Australia, where the vote was not held until the following year. The majority vote was yes in all the colonies.

=== 1898 referendums ===
Results by colony of the 1898 referendums

State	Date	For		Against		Total	Turnout
State	Date	Votes	%	Votes	%	Total	Turnout
Tasmania	3 June 1898	11,797	81.29	2,716	18.71	14,513	25.0
New South Wales	3 June 1898	71,595	51.95	66,228	48.05	137,823	43.5
Victoria	3 June 1898	100,520	81.98	22,099	18.02	122,619	50.3
South Australia	4 June 1898	35,800	67.39	17,320	32.61	53,120	30.9
Source: Federation Fact Sheet 1 – The Referendums 1898–1900, AEC and Australia's Constitutional Milestones, APH

=== 1899 and 1900 referendums ===
Results by colony of the 1899–1900 referendums

State	Date	For		Against		Total	Turnout
State	Date	Votes	%	Votes	%	Total	Turnout
South Australia	29 April 1899	65,990	79.46	17,053	20.54	83,043	54.4
New South Wales	20 June 1899	107,420	56.49	82,741	43.51	190,161	63.4
Tasmania	27 July 1899	13,437	94.40	791	5.60	14,234	41.8
Victoria	27 July 1899	152,653	93.96	9,805	6.04	162,458	56.3
Queensland	2 September 1899	38,488	55.39	30,996	44.61	69,484	54.4
Western Australia	31 July 1900	44,800	69.47	19,691	30.53	64,491	67.1
Source: Federation Fact Sheet 1 – The Referendums 1898–1900, AEC and Australia's Constitutional Milestones, APH

The bill as accepted by the colonies (except Western Australia, which voted after the act was passed by the British parliament) was sent to Britain to be enacted as an act passed by British Parliament.

== Federal Constitution ==
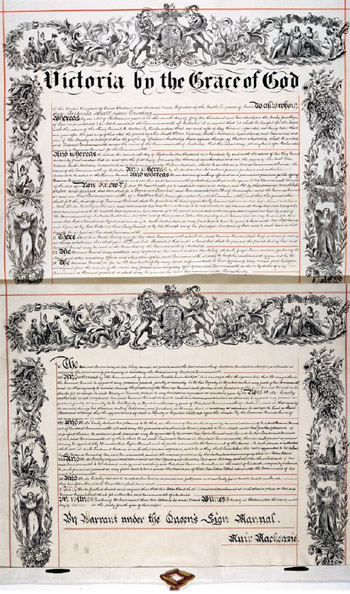
The letters patent issued by Queen Victoria creating the office of Governor-General, issued in 1900 as a part of the process of implementing the new federal constitution

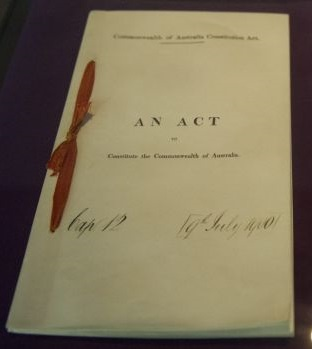
The Constitution of Australia

The Commonwealth of Australia Constitution Act 1900 (Imp) was passed on 5 July 1900 and given Royal Assent by Queen Victoria on 9 July 1900. It was proclaimed on 1 January 1901 in Centennial Park, Sydney. Sir Edmund Barton was sworn in as the interim Prime Minister, leading an interim Federal ministry of nine members.

The new constitution established a bicameral Parliament, containing a Senate and a House of Representatives. The office of governor-general was established as the Queen's representative; initially, as a representative of the British Government.

The Constitution also provided for the establishment of a High Court, and divided the powers of government between the states and the new Commonwealth government. The states retained their own parliaments, along with the majority of existing powers, but the federal government would be responsible for issues of defence, immigration, quarantine, customs, banking and coinage, among other powers.

== The economic consequences of federation ==
Australian federation entailed the creation of both a customs and a fiscal union. With respect to the customs union, tariffs were abolished on interstate trade (although this process occurred on a phased basis in Western Australia), while all of the colonies adopted the Commonwealth's common external tariff schedule in October 1901. The first federal (Commonwealth) was widely regarded as protectionist; indeed, with respect to imports from outside of Australia, the average tariff increased relative to the average of the individual colonies' average tariffs prior to federation, according to estimates produced by Melbourne economist Peter Lloyd. Nevertheless, the welfare-enhancing effect of the elimination of tariffs on interstate trade dominated the welfare-reducing effect of higher tariffs on overseas imports, such that the net static welfare gain from Australian federation was actually positive and estimated to have been 0.17% of GDP. With respect to the fiscal union, there was a harmonisation of excise duties at approximately the mid-level of the colonial excise duties.

== Landmarks named after Federation ==
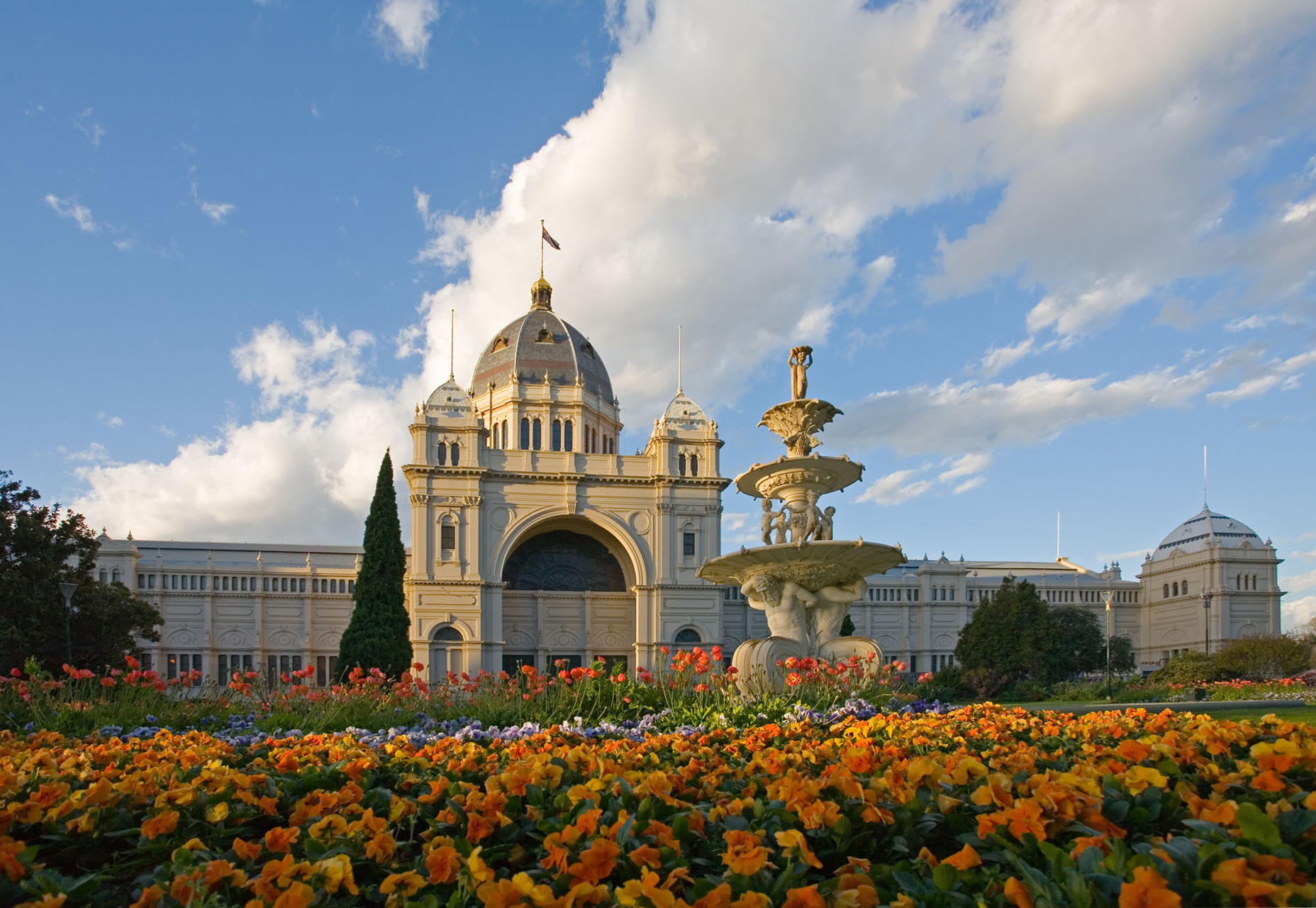
The Royal Exhibition Building in Melbourne is the site of the first sitting of Federal parliament.

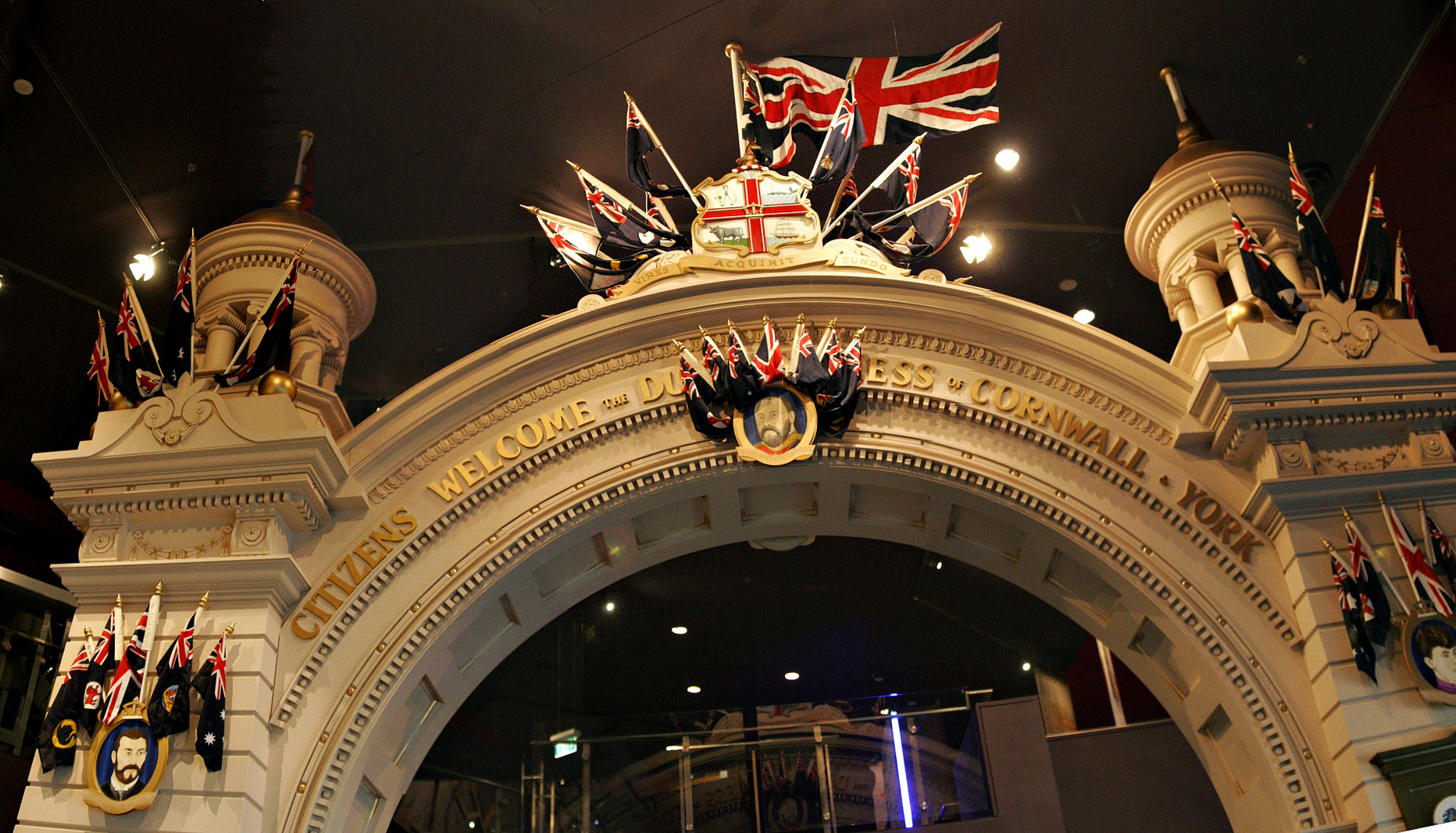
One of the many arches made to celebrate Federation, the Citizens Arch—National Museum, Canberra

The significance of Federation for Australia is such that a number of landmarks, natural and man-made, have been named after it. These include:

- Federal Highway, between Goulburn, New South Wales and Canberra
- Federation Creek, near Croydon, Queensland
- Federation Peak, Tasmania
- Federation Range, on the Royston River, about 90 kilometres (56 mi) east-northeast of Melbourne, Victoria
- Federation Square, Melbourne, Victoria
- Federation Trail, Melbourne, Victoria
- Federation University, Ballarat, Victoria

== See also ==
- Australian Bicentenary
- Australian Capital Territory
- Australian nationality law
- Comparable acts in Dominion nation-building:
  - New Zealand Constitution Act 1852
  - Canadian Confederation (1867)
  - National Convention (South Africa) (1909)
  - Anglo-Irish Treaty of 1921
  - Indian Independence Act 1947
  - Ceylon Independence Act 1947
- Federalism in Australia
- Federation Drought
- Government of Australia
- History of monarchy in Australia
- Inauguration of the Commonwealth
- Secessionism in Western Australia
