= Oliver Wood =

Oliver Wood may refer to:

- Oliver Wood (musician), American musician, one of The Wood Brothers
- Oliver Wood (cinematographer) (c. 1942–2023), English cinematographer
- Oliver Wood (cyclist) (born 1995), British cyclist
- Oliver Wood (general) (1825–1893), American Union brevet brigadier general during the Civil War era
- Oliver Wood (Harry Potter), a character in the Harry Potter novels by J. K. Rowling

== See also ==
- Oliver Woodward
- Olivewood (disambiguation)
