= Tenterfield School of Arts =

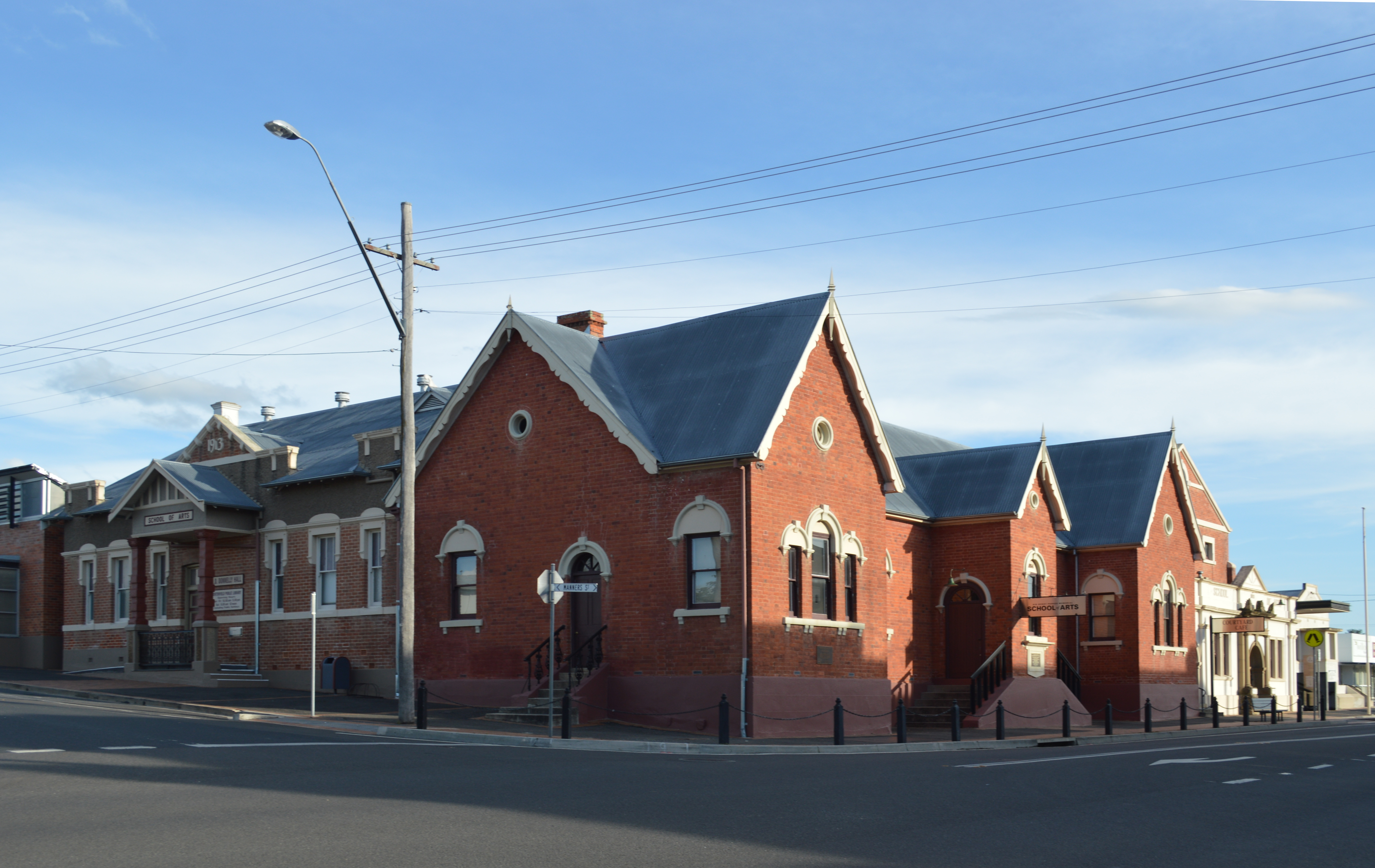

- Location within New South Wales Location within Australia
- 29°03′21″S 152°01′08″E
- Location: Manners Street, Tenterfield, Tenterfield Shire, New South Wales, Australia

History
- Built: 1869

Site notes
- Architectural styles: Victorian Rustic Gothic; Victorian Romanesque; Federation Free Classical
- Owner: National Trust of Australia (NSW)

New South Wales Heritage Register
- Official name: Tenterfield School of Arts; Sir Henry Parkes Memorial School of Arts
- Type: State heritage (built)
- Designated: 1 March 2002
- Reference no.: 1506
- Type: School of Arts
- Category: Community Facilities
- Builders: Mr Merrell

The Tenterfield School of Arts is a heritage-listed former school of arts and now museum, theatre, cinema, community centre and library located at Manners Street, Tenterfield in the Tenterfield Shire local government area of New South Wales, Australia. It was built in 1869 by Mr Merrell. It is also known as Sir Henry Parkes Memorial School of Arts. The property is owned by the National Trust of Australia, New South Wales branch. It was added to the New South Wales State Heritage Register on 1 March 2002.

The site is notable as the place where Sir Henry Parkes delivered the Tenterfield Oration, a speech proposing that the six separate British colonies in Australia should unite into a single federation.

== History ==
In his reminiscences of 1913, Mr Isaac Whereat wrote 'The first school of Arts was started about 1863 or 1864. Mr Geo. Wilson was elected president and Mr E. R. Whereat (aged 23) honorary secretary and treasurer. It was situated in a building occupied by Mr Raper, a tailor, at the corner of Scott and High Streets.'

It was afterwards removed to one of Mr Merrell's brick cottages in Rouse Street. In 1869 or 1870 they built the first School of Arts on the present site. It was slab building with a single roof and looked like a big barn. A year or so later public interest intensified and a bazaar was held and funds collected. The town and Country Journal of August 30, 1879 wrote 'The first meeting was held on March 9, 1871, when the Institution was organized and the committee appointed Mr J. F. W. Addision, Police Magistrate, was the first president. Great interest was manifested in the information, and subscriptions were collected, together with a bazaar to obtain funds, and a considerable sum was realised towards the erected of a building'.

On 26 November 1875 Mrs Lee, wife of Mr C. A. Lee who was Mayor and also president of the institution laid the foundation stone. It was opened on 7 September 1876, with great show, the day being observed as a general holiday.

The new School of Arts became the centre of community life with the town's first agricultural show being held in the building and adjoining grounds on 5–6 April 1877. The founders of the School of Arts were actively involved in the town's inaugural show with Edward Reeves Whereat presiding over the first meeting of the Tenterfield Pastoral, Agricultural and Horticultural Society when it was first formed in the late 1876. An original trustee of the School of Arts, Edward Irby of Bolivia Station was subsequently elected president.

In 1880 the Tenterfield Post and Telegraph office was completed.

During this period after the School of Arts was opened, in November 1882 events unfolded in Sydney which would ultimately embroil Tenterfield in the historic events that have given the School of Arts much of its cultural significance.

On 17 November Sir Henry Parkes, as Premier of New South Wales, had dissolved Parliament of New South Wales after the government was defeated on a Bill to modify controversial land laws created by his government some years before. Parkes looked beyond the current crisis to an extended term in office in which new achievements would crown his career.

In 1882 Edward Whereat retired and proposed Parkes as Member for Tenterfield. At the official nomination Whereat spoke warmly of "...the good likely to accrue to the district from being represented by a man of such ability, power and influence as Sir Henry Parkes". Tenterfield's mayor, David Corney, seconded the nomination and to enthusiastic cheers Parkes was elected unopposed.

A banquet in the School of Arts was held in February 1883 to honour Parkes' first trip to Tenterfield. In 1884 Parkes finished his term as Member for Tenterfield.

Sports organised by local school teacher Mr David Alexander Pike were held at the showground in September 1901 by the Fallen Soldiers Memorial Committee, in aid of the fund to erect a memorial to the local bushmen lost, in conjunction with the Tenterfield Mounted Rifles.

In 1935 A. D. Donnelly commenced his effort to protect and recognise the importance of the School of Arts. In 1937 Messers McMaster and Potts of Wallangarra, owners of the Lyric Theatre, attempted to take over the "School of Arts Talkies" from the Literary Institute. In 1938, the Literary Institute temporarily stopped the take over by the Lyric Theatre. In April 1938 the Lyric Theatre discontinued screening at the School of Arts.

In 1942 World War II was in full swing, the military authorities took over the School of Arts Main Hall. The military vacated the Main Hall in 1944.

A plaque was erected in 1946 by the Governor-General H. R. H. Prince Henry, Duke of Gloucester, to commemorate that Sir Henry Parkes had made his "famous Tenterfield Speech" there.

In 1952 the controversy over the condition and use of the School of Arts began again. The Lyric Theatre and Motion Picture Exhibitor's Association joined the controversy and tried to have the licence to screen film revoked. In 1953 the Chief Secretary's Department cancelled the licence to screen films. The big name appeal committee formed to protect the School of Arts after the constant persistence of A. vD. Donnnelly. Pleas were heard in 1954 - 58 by the Chief Secretary for panic lighting and safety inspection.

The building was threatened with demolition in the 1950s, but was saved after an extended community campaign, which saw the formation of the National Trust of Australia. In 1957, the National Trust of Australia (NSW) acquired its first property, the Tenterfield School of Arts, which was transferred by an Act of Parliament. In 1957 Tax deductibility for donations made to the National Trust funded the commencement of restoration. After refurbishment was carried out in 1960 the Main Public Hall was leased to Tenterfield Municipal Council for 30 years. Restoration and maintenance was completed during the 1960s. After being renamed the Sir Henry Parkes School of Arts, the building became the first museum operated by the Trust in Australia, containing a range of memorabilia related to the history of Federation and the local area. It is open to the public seven days a week.

A library, function centre, cinema and theatre are housed in the School of Arts building.

In 1996 a council meeting was held to discuss the opportunity of Federation of Centenary. In 1997 a Conservation Management Plan commenced.

== Description ==
There are four major stages of construction, following the demolition of the 1871 slab barn – 1876, 1884, 1903 and 1913. These construction dates embrace different architectural style which are expressive of the separate eras in which each part was built.

The School of Arts as it exists today, is really a complex of separate buildings.

The original part of the existing school of Arts complex, consisting of a Hall and Reading rooms built in 1876, was the culmination of community effort following the establishment of a Reading Room in 1863 by Edward Reeves Whereat when the township was barely ten years old.

In 1884 the building more than doubled in size with the addition of a No. 2 Hall to the east, a new bay to the south and gabled frontispieces to the Rouse St facade. These elements were constructed in a mixed Victorian Rustic Gothic and Victorian Romanesque styles.

The Main Hall in Federation Free Classical style, completed in 1903, is a memorial to men from Tenterfield who gave their lives during the Boer War, 1898–1901.

The Billiard Room, designed by F. J. Madigan, was completed in 1913 towards the end of period uniquely nationalist architectural expression not known as the Federation Style.

The local community and The National Trust in recognising the significance of the site and maintaining, its original characteristics have maintained the integrity of the building.

=== Modifications and dates ===
Since its construction the following modifications have been made to the School of Arts:

- 1884 – additions were made, including the steep gable entry portico and enlarged room to Rouse St elevation and construction of rooms under skillion roof along eastern façade.
- 1902 – construction of the Boer War Memorial arched entry portico and Main Public Hall to the south of the original hall facing Rouse St took place.
- 1903 – Main Public Hall opened.
- 1912 – original timber shingled roof replaced with corrugated galvanized iron.
- 1913 – demolition of rooms occurred at the rear of original hall adjacent to Manners St and construction of Billiard Room, now known as the A. D. Donnelly Hall.
- 1931 – plans made for alterations to the biograph room. Sound screens were installed.
- 1952 – controversy over the condition of the School of Arts following the resignation of A. G. Nelmes from committee after thirty five years.
- 1958 – the Local Management Committee appointed by the National Trust. Restoration commenced.
- 1960 to 1968 – refurbishment works were carried out, verandahs were removed from Rouse St due to interference with cars and renovations to the Billiard Room were carried out to convert it for general use. Probable addition of toilet to west end of dressing rooms and linking corridor wall to Kitchen wall. Construction of retaining walls and dish drains to eastern side of Committee Room and to the renamed A. D. Donnelly Hall.
- 1982 – construction of sealed car park, kerbs and gutters on land adjacent to the eastern side of the building.

== Heritage listing ==
As at 11 October 2000, the Sir Henry Parkes Memorial School of Arts is of historic significance as the venue for the now famous "Tenterfield Oration" delivered by Sir Henry Parkes on 24 October 1889. The School of Arts also has a long social and cultural association with the construction of Tenterfield as a community and the functioning as a community facility. Architecturally Sir Henry Parkes Memorial School of Arts is a prominent building reflecting the society and era dating back to the 1870s. The building and location reflect the beginning of a community functioning politically and creatively as a whole.

The Tenterfield School of Arts was listed on the New South Wales State Heritage Register on 1 March 2002 having satisfied the following criteria.

The place is important in demonstrating the course, or pattern, of cultural or natural history in New South Wales.

The Sir Henry Parkes Memorial School of Arts is of historic significance as the venue for the now famous "Tenterfield Oration" delivered by Sir Henry Parkes on 24 October 1889. The Tenterfield Municipal Library operates in the School of Arts today having maintained continuous occupancy of the site with this function since its predecessor, the Literary institute, was first established there in 1871. The halls within the complex continue their historical function as the main meeting place of the town. The school is the first building to be held in custodianship by the National Trust of Australia (NSW).

The place is important in demonstrating aesthetic characteristics and/or a high degree of creative or technical achievement in New South Wales.

The School of Arts has a landmark presence in the Town. The building is constructed of four aesthetically significant styles: First is the original part consisting of a Hall and Reading Rooms built in 1876. This was followed by the building in 1884 in mixed Victorian Rustic Gothic/ Romanesque style. Third, in 1903 a Federation Free Classical Style was completed with the addition of a number 2 Hall to the east, and finally, the Billiard Room was completed in 1913, consisting of a Federation style design.

The place has a strong or special association with a particular community or cultural group in New South Wales for social, cultural or spiritual reasons.

The 1875 School of Arts was executed in a function and rudimentary style and the culmination of efforts to fashion and a cultural centre in a pioneer town. The town still represents a community meeting place for the people of Tenterfield. The Main Hall is a memorial to the men from Tenterfield who lost their lives in the Boer War, which ushered in Australia's independent nationhood. This (memorial) Hall is considerably significant through having been created by some of Australia's earliest and best soldiers who grew out of the Upper Clarence Light Horse, established in 1885. The Billiard Room is of moderate significance. It became, as well as its intended use as gathering place for the men of the town to play billiards, a gathering place for the names of the 117 young men of the town who were absent in the Great European War of then indeterminate duration.

The place has potential to yield information that will contribute to an understanding of the cultural or natural history of New South Wales.

The Tenterfield's School of Arts depicts the evolution of the School of Arts movement in the stages of its development. Its Original Hall and Reading Rooms represents a humble balance between entertainment and education objectives while later extension demonstrate a drift in emphasis towards entertainment (the Main Hall ) and recreation (the Billiard Room). The phased development leaves a legible testimony to the rise and fall in the importance of the School of Arts.

== See also ==
- List of National Trust properties in Australia
- Australian non-residential architectural styles
- Federation of Australia
