= Olivewood (disambiguation) =

Olivewood, olive wood, or olive-wood is the wood of the olive tree.

Olivewood may also refer to:

== Places ==
- Olivewood, the historic home and museum of William Chaffey in Renmark, South Australia
- Olivewood Cemetery in Houston, Texas
- Olivewood Elementary School (disambiguation)
- Olivewood Gardens, a community garden and learning center in National City, California
- Olivewood Memorial Park, a cemetery in Riverside, California
- Olivewood Mini Park in Porterville, California

== Other uses ==
- Olivewood, the film-making industry in Cyprus
- Olive Wood, a character in the 1922 silent film The Bootleggers
- Olive Wood (race horse), the 1917 winner of the Spinaway Stakes
- Cassine laneana, or Bermuda Olivewood, a species of large tree

== See also ==
- Olive wood carving in Palestine
- Olive Woodhouse
- Olive Woodpecker
- Oliver Wood (disambiguation)
