= Tenterfield Oration =

1889 speech by Sir Henry Parkes in Tenterfield, New South Wales, Australia

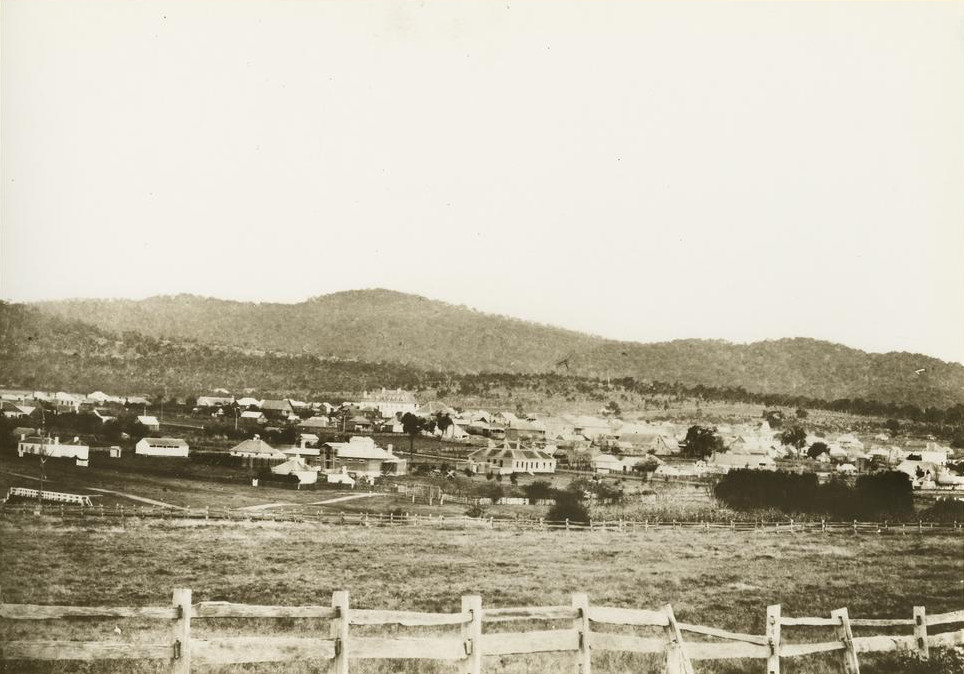
View of Tenterfield, New South Wales, 1887

The Tenterfield Oration was a speech delivered by Sir Henry Parkes, Premier of the Colony of New South Wales, at the Tenterfield School of Arts in Tenterfield, New South Wales, Australia, on 24 October 1889.

In the oration, Parkes called for the Federation of the six Australian colonies, which were then self-governing but remained under the authority of the British Colonial Secretary. The speech is regarded as the catalyst for the federation process in Australia, ultimately leading to the establishment of the Commonwealth of Australia 12 years later, in 1901.

== Background ==
The northern region of the New South Wales suffered from administrative disunity, as it was geographically distant from the colony's capital, Sydney, yet closer to commercial hubs across the border in Queensland. The imposition of border import tariffs by Queensland further complicated trade, frustrating many in neighboring districts who strongly supported free trade.

The primary reason given by Premier Parkes for federation in the Tenterfield Oration was the necessity of a united defence of the Australian continent. In a 1999 address, Bob Carr, Premier of New South Wales from 1995 to 2005, compared the significance of the Tenterfield Oration for Australia to that of Abraham Lincoln's Gettysburg Address in the United States.

At Tenterfield, Parkes urged the seven colonies (including the Colony of New Zealand) to "unite and create a great national government for all Australia." He explicitly cited the United States as an inspiration, emphasizing its achievement of independence from British rule. This call for unity resonated deeply with the colonists. The speech was widely published in Australian newspapers, and Parkes' subsequent efforts in petitioning the Queen and drafting the Constitution earned him the title of "Father of Federation".

The site of the Tenterfield Oration was formally commemorated by the Commonwealth Governor-General in 1946.

Prompted by Parkes' Tenterfield Oration, the colonies agreed to send delegates to a Constitutional Conference in Melbourne in 1890. This initiated the process of drafting and adopting the Commonwealth Constitution over the course of the 1890s, ultimately leading to the unification of the colonies and the establishment of a system of federalism in Australia.

== The Speech ==
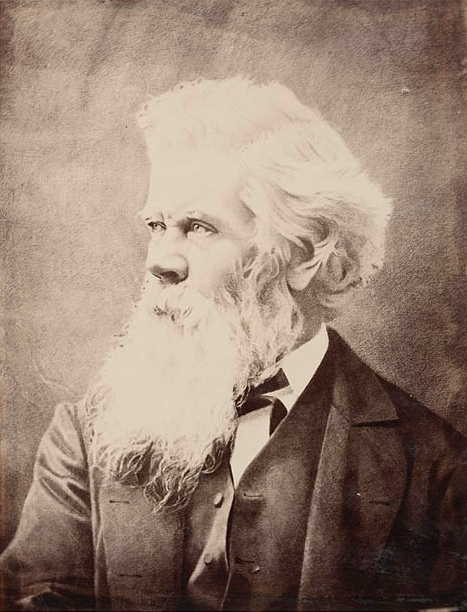
Sir Henry Parkes

The speech referred to the Parliament of New South Wales and the Parliament of Queensland, and quoted the poem The Dominion by James Brunton Stephens:

I can not find words with which to acknowledge your toast to the Ministry and myself, without remembering the time when I stood for a short period in intimate relationships with you, as the Member for Tenterfield. This was one of the passages of my life that is not likely to fade away as I remember how generously you elected me within a few hours of my defeat for East Sydney in 1884. I also remember the generous confidence you showed in refusing to accept my resignation on the occasion of my thirteen month visit to England.

There are two important questions towards which your attention ought to be directed. You must have heard something of the Federal Council, on which NSW has not yet taken a place. It sat in Tasmania and held sessions which never appeared to interest any one. But if we are to carry out the recommendations of General Edwards on matters military, it will be absolutely necessary for us to have a central authority, which could bring all the forces of the different colonies into one army.

Some colony statesmen have said that this might be done by means of the Federal Council. But this Federal Council has no power to do anything of the sort. It is not an elective body, but merely a body appointed by the governments of the various colonies. Their argument, therefore, is necessarily weak, and under the Imperial Act which appointed it, the Federal Council has no power to set up or control a great Australian Army. The Federal Council has no executive power. It may propose but not execute. I would like to know what would become of an army without a central executive power to guide its movements. One way which has been suggested out of the difficulty is that the Imperial Parliament be asked to pass a measure authorising the troops of the colonies to unite in one federal army. But still, even if this were done, there would be an absence of the necessary executive government. The colonies would object to the armies being under the control of the Imperial Government and none of these colonies could direct it.

The great question which we have to consider is, whether the time has not now arisen for the creation on this Australian continent of an Australian government and an Australian parliament.

To make myself as plain as possible, Australia has now a population of three and a half millions, and the American people numbered only between three and four millions when they formed the great Commonwealth of the United States. The numbers are about the same. Surely what the Americans have done by war, Australians can bring about in peace. Believing, as I do, that it is essential to preserve the security and integrity of these colonies, then the whole of our forces should be amalgamated into one great Federal army. Seeing no other means of obtaining these ends, it seems to me that the time is close at hand when we ought to set about creating this great national Government for all Australia.

This subject brings us face to face with another subject. We have now, from South Australia to Queensland, a stretch of about two thousand miles of railways and if the four colonies could only combine to adopt a uniform gauge, it would be an immense advantage in the movement of troops. These are two great national questions which I wish to lay before you: one great federal army and a nationwide uniform-gauge railway line.

I have just returned from Brisbane, and the object of my business has been not to force my advice on the authorities there, but to discuss with them these matters. Unfortunately, owing to the illness of the Head of Ministry, our communications were rather of a private character than otherwise. But without disclosing any confidences, I think that both sides of politics sympathised warmly and closely with the views, which I expressed to them. As to the steps, which should be taken to bring about the foregoing, a conference of authorities has been suggested but we must take a broader and more powerful action on the initiation of this great council. We must appoint a convention of leading men from all the colonies. Delegates should be appointed by the authority of Parliament and fully represent the opinion of the different parliaments of the colonies. This Convention will have to devise the Constitution which will be necessary for bringing into existence a Federal Government with a Federal Parliament for the conduct of this great national undertaking.

The only argument which could be advanced in opposition to the views I have put forward, is that the time has not come and that we must remain isolated colonies, just in the same way as we are now. I believe, however, that the time has come; and that, in the words of Brunton Stephens, the Queensland poet: – I ask:

"Not yet her day! How long? Not yet!
There comes her flush of violet!
And heavenward faces all aflame,
With sanguine imminence of morn,
Wait but the sun's kiss to proclaim
The day of the Dominion born."

I believe that the time has come, and if two Governments set an example, the others must soon of necessity follow. There will be an uprising in this fair land of a goodly fabric of free Government, and all great national questions of magnitude affecting the welfare of the colonies will be disposed of by a fully authorised constitutional authority. This means a distinct executive and a distinct parliamentary power for the whole of Australia, and it means a Parliament of two Houses, a House of Commons and a Senate, which will legislate on these great subjects.

The Government and Parliament of New South Wales would be just as effective as now in all local matters, and so would the Parliament of Queensland. All great questions will be dealt with in a broad manner just as the Congress deals with the national affairs of the United States and as the Parliament of the Dominion of Canada deals with similar questions.

The opportunity has arisen for the consideration of this great subject and I believe that the time is at hand... when this thing will be done. Indeed, this great thing will have to be done, and to put it off will only tend to make the difficulties which stand in the way, greater.

== See also ==
- Canadian Confederation
- Articles of Confederation (United States)
