= Olivewood Elementary School =

Olivewood Elementary School may refer to:

- Olivewood Elementary School, National City, California, United States
- Olivewood Elementary School, Saddleback Valley Unified School District, California, United States
