= Saint Ignatius School, Wentworth =

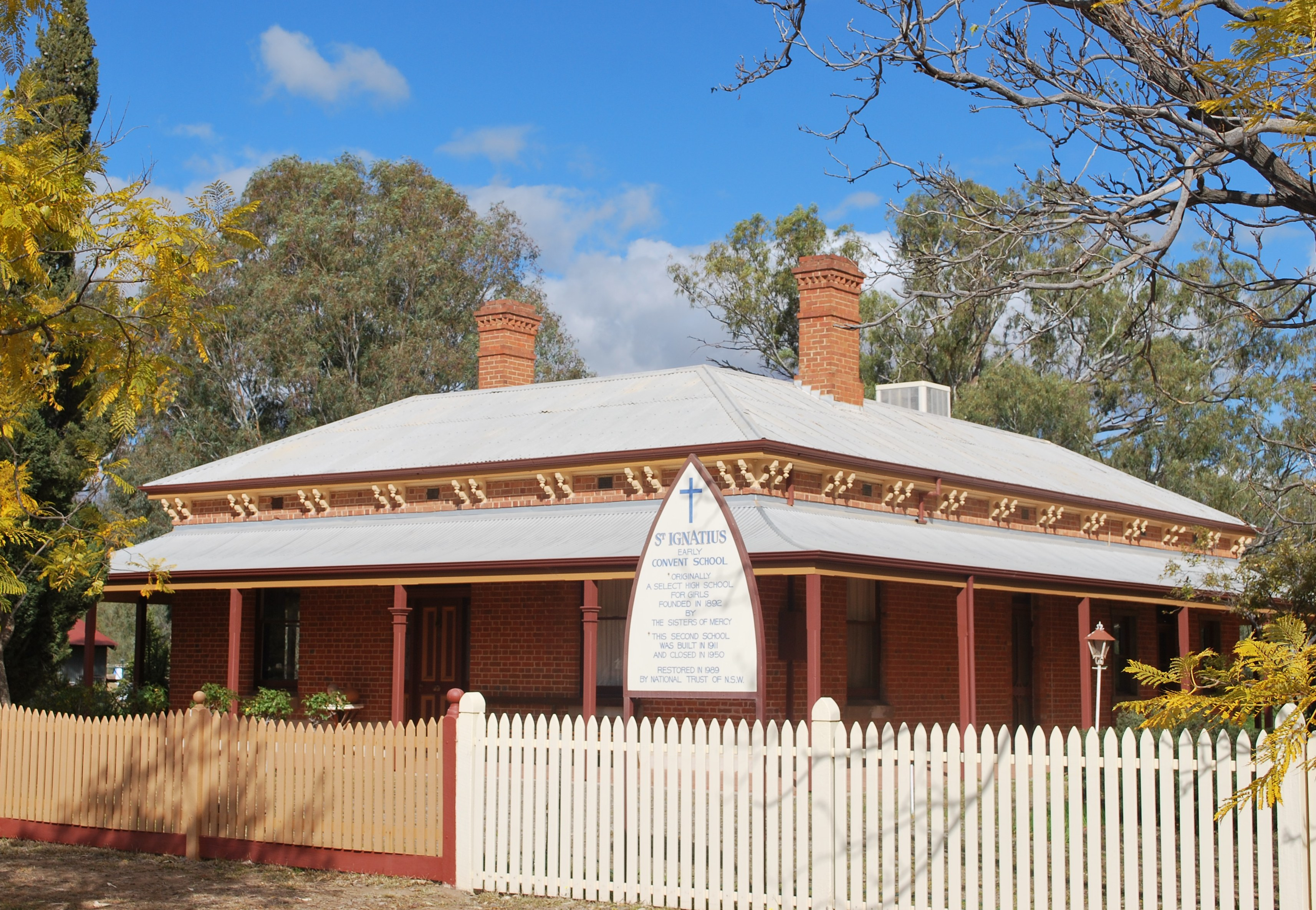
- The former Saint Ignatius School, in 2009

- Location within New South Wales Location within Australia
- 34°06′42″S 141°54′57″E
- Location: 30 Caddell Street, Wentworth, Wentworth Shire, New South Wales, Australia

History
- Built: 1911–1912

New South Wales Heritage Register
- Official name: St. Ignatius School
- Type: State heritage (built)
- Designated: 1 March 2002
- Reference no.: 1507
- Type: School – Private
- Category: Education
- Builders: Ducan McLean

Saint Ignatius School (abbreviated as St Ignatius School) is a heritage-listed former kindergarten and Roman Catholic school and now museum and National Trust branch office, located at 30 Caddell Street, Wentworth, in the Wentworth Shire, New South Wales, Australia. The school was built between 1911 and 1912 by Ducan McLean. The building was added to the New South Wales State Heritage Register on 1 March 2002.

== History ==
Situated at the confluence of the Murray and Darling rivers, Wentworth was settled in 1840, town surveyed in 1958 and named in honour of explorer William Charles Wentworth. At turn of the century, Wentworth was the largest river port in the country, docking up to 100 paddle steamers a month.

St Ignatius High School, described as a "select" school, was opened by the Sisters of Mercy in 1892 and a boarding school for girls opened at the convent in 1898. Students traveled from surrounding areas, sometimes over many days, by horse and buggy or riverboat, and attended St Ignatius School each day.

A new schoolhouse was built in 1911 as a tall, wooden structure on the west side of the convent, where the nuns taught many extra subjects, such as languages, bookkeeping, painting, wax modeling art, needlework, singing, pianoforte, violin, etc.

== Description ==
The building is an unusual symmetrical structure of weatherboard construction. The single room structure has a centrally located entrance porch on the northern side. The main gambrel roof is clad with corrugated iron sheeting and the little gable over the porch has simple timber decoration. The building is supported on timber posts set in the ground. There is a curved, embossed iron window hood over the northern porch window. The former school room has a boarded ceiling and much of the internal joinery is intact. The large main windows have the appearance of double hung windows however, the sashes operate as casements. The building has been recently restored and repaired. A brick fireplace and chimney on the western side has been replaced with a replica. The original two- tone colour scheme has been rendered.

=== Condition ===
As at 29 June 2000, the property was in excellent condition following the 1988–89 restorations.

The integrity of the property remains as no significant renovations have changed the original structure from that of the design in the early nineteenth century. The properties intactness adds to its recognition and overall social and historical significance.

=== Modifications and dates ===
Restoration work was carried out between January 1988 and April 1989 for the National Trust. The project architect was R. Howard; and the builder was Denis J. Wynne. Roof repairs included patching and re-use of old sheets; the guttering was replaced. Brick fireplace and chimney replaced based on original drawing. Windows and floors Ceilings, front and rear entrance steps repaired/ restored. Exterior and interior repainted in original colour scheme.

== Heritage listing ==
As at 3 July 2000, a small, unusual wooden schoolhouse with many original details and featuring an early colour scheme. Building is both architecturally and historically significant to the town of Wentworth and significant in its earliest contribution to the education of children from outlying areas.

St Ignatius School was listed on the New South Wales State Heritage Register on 1 March 2002 having satisfied the following criteria.

The place is important in demonstrating the course, or pattern, of cultural or natural history in New South Wales.

St Ignatius School is an example of "select" schooling in a town with a significant history as a major trading centre.

The place is important in demonstrating aesthetic characteristics and/or a high degree of creative or technical achievement in New South Wales.

A most unusual and beautifully proportioned symmetrical building of rusticated weatherboard constructed. The intactness of the building also adds to the aesthetic significance of the site. The church like architectural design reinforces the association with religion, the building being the former site of the Catholic school.

The place has a strong or special association with a particular community or cultural group in New South Wales for social, cultural or spiritual reasons.

Marked the dedicated service to the parish of Wentworth by the Sisters of Mercy. The long association with schooling in Wentworth has formed a social recognition within the community.

The place has potential to yield information that will contribute to an understanding of the cultural or natural history of New South Wales.

St Ignatius School is of particular education value in allowing school students experience the type of materials used in education in the early nineteenth century.

The place possesses uncommon, rare or endangered aspects of the cultural or natural history of New South Wales.

The properties rare in the unique design of the small schoolhouse and the development of a unique social and historical background beginning in the early nineteenth century.

== See also ==
- Lists of schools in New South Wales
- List of Catholic schools in New South Wales
