= Matta House =

Coordinates: 33°58′25″S 137°42′21″E

Matta House is a heritage-listed house in Matta Road, Matta Flat, South Australia. It was listed on the South Australian Heritage Register on 24 July 1980 and on the former Register of the National Estate on 21 March 1978.

It was built in 1863 for Edward Austin Horn, the manager of the Matta Matta Mine. The mine, located north of the house, operated from 1860 until 1870. The house was built with rubble and had a shingle roof; the roof was later covered by galvanised iron, but replaced with red cedar shingles in 1975.

The house was purchased by the Kadina Rotary Club around 1965, with funding for a museum also contributed by the Northern Yorke Peninsula Agricultural Bureau. A branch of the National Trust of South Australia was established in Kadina during 1966. The museum opened on 25 March 1967. It is now managed by the National Trust branch as part of The Farm Shed Museum.
