= William Paxton (Australian businessman) =

Australian colonist

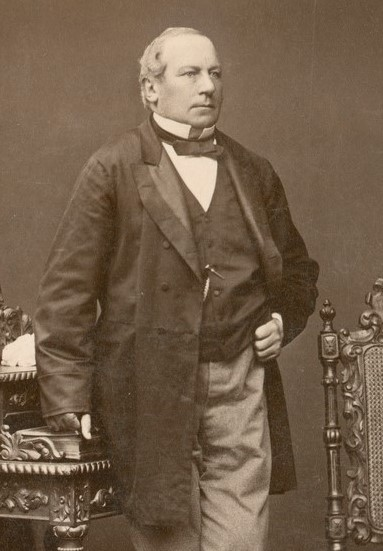

William Paxton (1818 – 1 September 1893) was a South Australian colonist who arrived in the Province of South Australia in 1840, became one of the investors in the Burra copper mines and returned to England in July 1855, as a wealthy man.

== Early life ==
Some sources give his birthplace as Whitby, Cheshire, or Whitby, Yorkshire but he was christened on 22 February 1819 in Claydon, Oxfordshire, a long way from either, and was a resident of Brighton, Sussex, before leaving for Australia, and was a pharmacist by training.

== Pharmacy ==
He arrived in Adelaide on 11 August 1840 on the barque Lalla Rookh.

In November 1840 he took over W. E. Bayldon's chemist shop "Apothecaries' Hall" at the west end of Hindley Street. He was joined by Dr. L. Moore, who had been the surgeon on the "Lalla Rookh". Paxton became embroiled in a criminal prosecution of a medical practitioner over a death from over-prescription of morphine. The medico, who had an alcohol problem, had clearly been negligent in his treatment of the patient (he was attempting a cure of a mental problem with an uncontrolled form of deep sleep therapy), but was exonerated over a technicality: that Paxton had supplied a different species of morphine from that which he prescribed. According to one account, for some reason he refused to pay the first corporation rates so a large jar of some drug was seized from his shop and sold at auction. In March 1844 he reopened as "Paxton's Medical Hall" opposite "Club House" in Hindley Street, with "Paxton Hall" emblazoned across its facade in letters of vitreous china. The business was taken over by his shop manager George Dale in February 1851 and renamed "Dale's Medical Hall",

=== Chemists' shops of early Adelaide ===
Adapted from "Register" articles on Harry A. Dale (son of George)
Mr. George Dale died, and the firm was managed by W. Goddard, on behalf of the trustees, with Harry as apprentice then was taken over by F. H. Faulding & Co. with Goddard in charge under the business name of "W. Goddard & Co.", then a W. Long took charge. He was subsequently joined by Mr. A. J. Lovely, and the firm became known by the euphonious title of "Long and Lovely".
James Allen had a shop at the corner of Hindley and Morphett streets, then came Dale's Medical Hall, and further on Main and Geyer's establishment, which was situated between Miller, Anderson's and the Exchange Hotel.
In Rundle street F. H. 'Faulding & Co. had a retail business, their wholesale establishment being at the rear of this in Clarence place. Further east was W. D. Allott's shop, and a Dr. Healy had a dispensary at the corner of Rundle and Pulteney streets, which was subsequently carried on by Mr. W. D. Porter. On the other side of Pulteney street Mr. Wood had a pharmacy, close to Tavistock street (now Frome Street). A little later Moritz Heuzenroeder started a chemist's business in Rundle street, next to Gercke & Roedemann's. It was subsequently acquired by Messrs. Gunther & Von Doussa, and afterwards by Mr. B. Grummett. Also on Rundle street was Hutton's shop.
Mr. Bickford was in Hindley street next door to Miller, Anderson's, on the west side; and on the death of Mr. Bickford was managed by K. Hutton. In 1884, the firm disposed of it to Mr. J. Provost.
On King William street, two doors from Rundle street was the shop of Henry Watson, maker of Watson's antibilious and digestive pills. Watson had been a customs officer and a partner of J. B. Hack (as Hack, Watson and Co.)
Dr. O'Hea was one of the earliest druggists. His shop was on North Terrace, near Bank street (in the early days some doctors did their own dispensing).
In those days the chemists packed all the important tinctures and liniments in small bottles for sale by the storekeepers. Such lines as citric acid, baking powder, bicarbonate of soda, carbonate of ammonia, and culinary essences, were not handled by the wholesale grocers, the retail grocer purchasing them from the wholesale chemist. The line of demarcation was then more clearly defined than is the case at present. There was no restricting Poisons Act. in those days. In all places where there were no retail pharmacists, the grocers stocked lines as spirits of ammonia, sweet spirits of nitre, laudanum; friars' balsam, and so on.

== Milling ==
Paxton was purchasing wheat for cash in January 1846 and was for a time in partnership with William R. S. Cooke in the flour milling business of Wm. Cook and Co, presumably as underwriter, and he was named that year as owner of the new steam mill (later the "Albion Mill") in Grenfell Street. The partnership was dissolved in January 1847. He showed his continuing interest after his return to England by offering a prize for the best British wheat grown from South Australian seed.

== Copper mining ==
He was one of the founders of the South Australian Mining Association "The Snobs" in April 1845, purchasing 28 shares of £5 in the northern portion of the Burra Special Survey, afterwards known as the Burra Burra mine. At their peak, £5 shares were worth £225 each, and were returning a dividend of £40 per annum.

At the election of officers 1845, those nominated for directors (seven to be chosen, three to be replaced each year and ineligible for re-election for one year) were: George Bean, Charles Beck, Tom Cox Bray (father of John Cox Bray), Edward Castres Gwynne, Hon. Jacob Hagen, John Cundy Sleman, Henry Mildred, William Paxton, Samuel Payne, Alderman William Peacock, Robert Sanders, Matthew Smith, Emanuel Solomon, Samuel Stocks, jun. and Thomas Whistler. Other early subscribers were: William Allen, J. Dickens, Michael Featherstone, J. B. Graham, G. S. Kingston, John Newman, J. B. Neales, Robert Pepperell (publican, returned to London 1848), John Ridley, George Stevenson.

He also invested in the company town Kooringa, building four hotels and more permanent accommodation, including those now called "Paxton's Cottages".

== Property ==
He purchased sections 97 and 144 of around 250 acres "Lockleys Estate" in the early 1850s, which was used by pastoralist Charles Brown Fisher (ca.1918 – 1908) for his stables and horse paddocks. He sold it to Fisher in 1853.

He purchased section 1049, Semaphore South with sea frontage in the region of Hart Street, Stella Lane and Paxton Street; the area being given the name "Whitby".

In 1848 and 1849, William Paxton and Samuel Stocks jun. purchased part of section 1 of the 'Gawler Special Survey' being "part of a public highway found unsuitable for such purposes". After Stocks' death in 1850, Paxton developed it as the town of Willaston.

He lent money to Gawler pioneer John Reid, with the mortgage on Reid's 630 acres (250 ha) property "Clonlea" as security. When Reid was unable to repay the loan Paxton resumed all the property apart from the homestead and 40 acres (16 ha). He subdivided the land and sold it by auction.

He had considerable landholdings in Burra, including the Paxton Square houses and all four Burra hotels three in Kooringa: the "Burra Hotel", "Lord's Hotel" and the "Pig and Whistle" (which two were run by the Cowper brothers), and the "Smelters' Arms" (later "Opie's Hotel") which he built as a competitor to Stacy's "Southampton Arms" in the suburb of Aberdeen. The "Burra" became White's School, then the hospital. The "Pig" burned down ca. 1900.

In 1855 he purchased Town Acre 142 on Grenfell Street, which had been set aside as Church property and required a special Act to enable the sale.

== Politics ==
In 1851 he was invited by petition, as was the practice, to represent Kooringa in parliament. He modestly declined, preferring the role of kingmaker. He did however stand for the Municipal elections in 1852 in both Hindmarsh and Gawler wards, winning them both! And then he put his name forward in at the Port Adelaide by-election of 1853 (brought about by the resignation of Captain Hall), but was defeated soundly by Captain Scott and became the object of some hilarity. He resigned his Aldermanic post in 1854; his place being taken, albeit briefly, by Thomas Reynolds.

== Newspaper ==
He helped found, with John Baker, John Ellis, William Allen and Andrew Murray, the "Adelaide Morning Chronicle" in January 1852, in opposition to the "South Australian Register", which was sceptical about their motives. It folded in March the following year.

== Horseracing ==
There is no record of Paxton being a rider, but he owned a number of racehorses, the most successful being the bay gelding "Highflyer". He acted as Treasurer for the first Gawler races, was a member of the South Australian Jockey Club, and on occasion, acted as Steward.

== Family life ==
He married Mary Ann Cowper in 1843. Among their children were:

- Robert Charles Paxton M.A. (19 October 1845 – ), a barrister, he married Marion Tod on 1 June 1871
- Marian Adelaide Paxton (1849– )
- Catherine Elizabeth Paxton (c. 1850) married Charles Lewis (Tincler) Blennerhassett on 3 February 1883.
- Henry Leonard "Harry" Paxton (5 October 1851 – 16 January 1852)
- Alice Paxton (20 November 1852 – 3 December 1854)
- Eva Paxton (7 November 1853 – )
- Alfred William Paxton (c. 1855 – c. 15 September 1898) was an investor with a seat on the London Stock Exchange and a partner in Hay, Graves and Paxton, owners of Marra Station. He committed suicide at Bondi, New South Wales by a revolver shot to the head. Well known at the racetrack, he was an inveterate gambler and had recently made significant losses.

The Paxton home for many years was on North Terrace. He was to appeal to the Supreme Court in 1855 against the erection opposite, of the Adelaide Hospital. It was later sold to Henry Ayers and is now famous as "Ayers House"

Paxton, his wife and two daughters returned to England in 1855 and never saw Australia again. At his farewell speech, John Baker, M.L.C. made a barbed reference to the number of colonists who, having made a fortune, retired to England taking their wealth with them.

According to one account, he had a favourite cow, and pensioned her for life on a piece of land in Tavistock street.

In 1863 he presented to the South Australian Institute a collection of coins and medals, 670 pieces in all.

His home in 1869 was Linden House, Cheswick, Northumberland; in 1871 was 1 Palace Gate, Kensington, and when he died was Palmeira Square, Hove.

== Recognition ==
His caricature by S. T. Gill entitled "Throw physic to the dogs" (referring to his days as a druggist) is held by the State Library of South Australia.

Paxton Cottages, Paxton Terrace and Paxton Square in Burra are named for him.

A street in Semaphore South where he had considerable property is called Paxton Street.
