= South Australian Railway Company =

The South Australian Railway Company was an attempt in the 1840s by private capitalists to establish a railway in the infant colony of South Australia. The company was based in London, where most of the capital was to be raised, £25,000 in the first instance. There were two or three local directors, since in the days before electric undersea cable telegraph, London was too far away for effective control.

== Routes ==
The first route from Adelaide to Port Adelaide was only 6 miles long, quite straight and flat and suitable for horse drawn operation. The initial line was to be single track, with frequent crossing loops.

A longer route to the Burra copper mines was proposed later on.

== Directors ==
British directors (possibly incomplete): G. F. Angas, Esq., George Barnes Esq, W.G Gover, Esq., Rowland Hill, Esq., J. B. Montefiore, Esq.: Managing Director.—Edwin Hill, Esq.: Colonial Director—Robert Gouger, Esq.

The provisional committee in February 1846 was:

- Capt. Bagot M.L.C.
- John Baker Esq.
- Charles Beck, Esq.
- James Bunce, Esq.
- William Giles, Esq.
- Jacob Hagen, Esq. M.L.C.
- John Hart, Esq.
- Capt. George Hall
- James Henderson, Esq.
- E. L. Montefiore, Esq.
- J. B. Neales, Esq.
- William Peacock, Esq.
- Saml. Stocks, Jun., Esq.
- W. Younghusband, Esq.

== Timeline ==
- 1836 Colony of South Australia is founded
- 1846 (February) Advertisement for Prospectus to raise capital of £25,000. (with power to increase).
- 1846 (July) Special Meeting to approve amalgamation with the Adelaide City and Port Railway Company
- 1850 Survey of his proposed line to a point distant 65 to 70 miles from Adelaide, and only 26 miles from the Burra Burra Copper mines.
- 1854 Steam operated government railway opens.
- 1856 Sir—May I be permitted to enquire what has become of the funds collected by the South Australian Railway Company. I hold scrip, of which the ...
- 1865 A South Australian Railway Company has been projected, and several influential parties are moving in the matter.

== See also ==
- Rail transport in South Australia
- List of former Australian railway companies
