= Henry Roach =

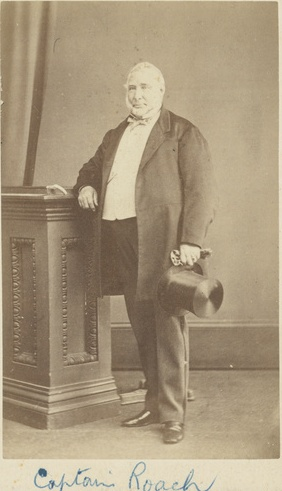
- Captain Henry Roach (date unknown)
- Born: 1808; Redruth, Cornwall
- Died: 6 October 1889 (aged 80–81); Burra, South Australia
- Occupation: Miner
- Known for: Captain of Burra mine

Henry Roach (1808 – 6 October 1889) was a miner from Cornwall who was Captain of the Burra copper mine in Burra, South Australia for many years. In this position he almost always employed Cornishmen as his assistants, and most of the miners were also immigrants from Cornwall.

== Early years ==
Henry Roach was born in 1808 in Redruth, Cornwall.

He worked at the Tresavean mine at Lanner, Cornwall, and also in Colombia. He reached South Australia in 1846.

== Burra mine ==
A shepherd had come across copper ore near Burra Creek in 1845, and another shepherd found copper ore to the north soon after. This triggered a scramble by miners from Adelaide to get control of the land.

The northern half became the Burra Mine, one of the world's largest copper mines. Most of the miners and specialists at the Burra mine were from Cornwall, with 1,000 workers at one point.

Roach was soon made captain at the Burra mine in charge of the underground workings, and then made chief captain of all mine operations. He was superintendent from 1847. He continued as captain, with a salary of £300. For most of the mine's period of operation Henry Ayers was the company's chief secretary, working in Adelaide. (Note: Ayers entered politics and gained huge influence. Ayers Rock is named after him.) The first of several beam engines from Cornwall was ordered by Ayers in August 1847. Roach oversaw the erection of all the Cornish engines. Roach's engine house was completed in 1849 and pumping began in October 1849.

Roach always recommended Cornishmen for his assistants. Matthew Bryant was hired as second captain in June 1847. The "grass captain", Samuel Penglaze, was appointed in 1848. Roach employed Cornishmen such as Richard Goldsworthy of Bodmin, third captain, John Congdon from the Caradon mines, chief engineer, and Philip Santo of Saltash, clerk of works. The Cornwall and Devon Society was founded in South Australia in December 1850 with John Bentham Neales of Plymouth, an investor in the Burra mine, as secretary. The aim was to encourage immigration from the English counties of Cornwall and Devon, and to look after the interests of colonists from those counties. Henry Roach was a member of the committee.

Roach named the township of Redruth at Burra after his home town in Cornwall.

A number of miners made homes in caves in the bank of Burra creek rather than pay rent to the company. In the autumn of 1851 there were a series of floods that drove them out. Ayers was sympathetic at first, but soon posted a notice saying that any miner who chose to remain in the caves would be considered a trespasser. Knowing that Roach was likely to be soft on the men, Ayers gave Roach firm instructions not to help the washed-out families. He did allow Roach to help rebuild the bridge across the creek, but only if doing so did not delay completion of the new engine house.

In 1852 gold was discovered in Victoria, and many of the miners left Burra. The number of employees declined to 100 from an earlier peak of 1,000. Pumping was suspended in October 1852 and the mine was flooded. In 1853 mining had almost ceased, and Roach's engine house was dismantled. Men gradually returned in 1854, and in 1855 pumping resumed. By 1861 there were six engines in operation to drain the mines, and three smaller engines to raise and crush the copper ore.

With a slump in the price of copper, Ayers told Roach on 19 February 1866 that all operations would be suspended and all officers were dismissed as of the end of March. Some work continued dressing existing low-grade ore.

== Later life and death ==
Roach was given one month's notice in 1867, and retired in 1868.

In 1874 Roach put up a flour mill in the township of Graham, (Note: "The township of Graham was laid out in 1874 under instructions from Ayers, and consisted of only 21 allotments on six acres." It was named after J. B. Graham, the largest shareholder in the Mining Association. In 1876 the individual townships, including Graham, were consolidated as the Corporation of the Town of Burra.) which stood until 1941.

Roach died on 6 October 1889, aged 80.
