= English and Australian Copper Company =

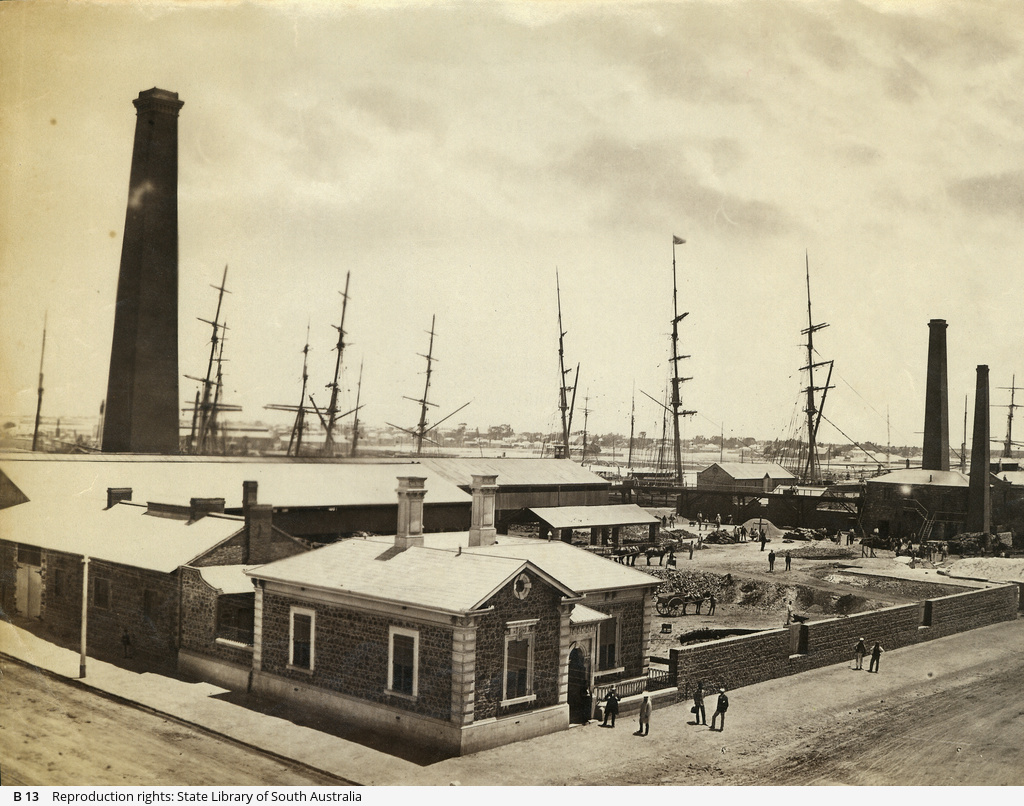
The English and Australian Copper Co.'s smelting works and wharf at Port Adelaide, ca. 1880

The English and Australian Copper Company was a South Australian based company, established in 1851 from the transfer of assets of the Patent Copper Company (formerly based in Swansea, South Wales). Formed as a joint stock company, with smelting works at Spitty (South Wales) and Kooringa (Burra, South Australia), it also maintained wharves at Port Adelaide and Port Wakefield, where copper ore was largely supplied by the South Australian Mining Association (SAMA).

The Spitty copper works were disposed of in 1855, and most of the company’s operations were transferred to South Australia. In 1861, a copper smelting works was opened in Port Adelaide. However, due to the reduced production of copper ore in the colony, the company’s Kooringa works suspended operations in 1869, and in 1872, a portion of the smelting plant and machinery was transferred to Newcastle, New South Wales, where the Lambton Works opened.

In 1918, the English and Australian Copper Company dissolved and ceased operations as a business.
