= George Hall (Australian politician) =

Australian politician

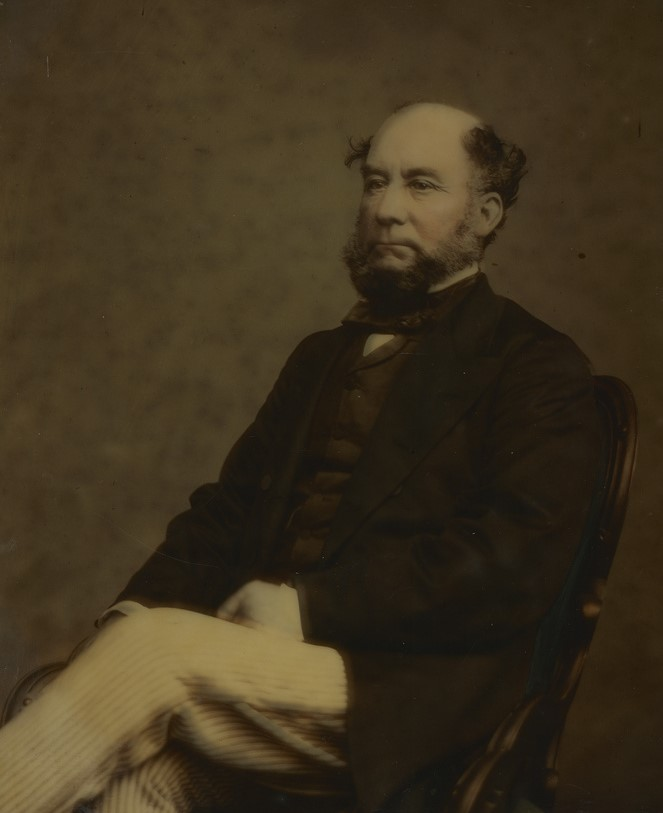

George Hall, M.L.C., (2 March 1811 – 28 January 1867) often styled "Captain Hall", was a South Australian shipping agent, company director and politician.

He was born at Bromley, Kent and left school at an early age to become a merchant seaman, and later captained ships on the East Indian and West Indian trade routes. His involvement with the South Australian Company began when David McLaren, manager of the South Australian Company, controversially contracted him to transport goods for the Company from Singapore to Port Adelaide in the "Guiana", becoming, on 7 October 1840, the first to unload goods at the new wharf.

== Business ==
In 1844 he returned to South Australia on the "Taglioni", and started a business salt-curing beef using a setup of his own design. He worked for a time on a cattle property near Angaston then set up a shipping business in Port Adelaide; the ships he represented included "David Malcolm", "Punch" and "Velocity".

He was on the committee of the South Australian Railway Company which in 1849 amalgamated with the Adelaide City and Port Railway Company and subsequently folded. It would appear the shareholders lost their money.

He was on the committee of the Chamber of Commerce from its first AGM in 1851 to 1860 and chairman 1856 – 57

He was a director on the board of several mining companies, notably, from 1851, the South Australian Mining Association, owners of the Burra Burra mine. He was founder (with J. C. Verco, Philip Santo, F. H. Faulding and a few others) of the Kurilla mine near Wallaroo, purchased in 1863.

He was a founder, with Henry Ayers, F. H. Faulding and a dozen others in 1861, of the South Australian Gas Company.

== Politics ==
In July, 1851 he was elected to the South Australia's first parliament for the district of Port Adelaide, his opponent being William Giles, manager of the South Australian Company. He submitted his resignation in July 1853 around the same time as that of J. T. Bagot, forcing the prorogation of parliament, and travelled to Great Britain, returning in August 1854.

In March 1857 he was elected to the newly formed Legislative Council, and remained a member until his death.

== Personal ==
Mrs Hall arrived in South Australia on the "Guiana" with her husband in 1840. The last newspaper reference to Mrs Hall in Adelaide was in March 1866 so she may have left some time between then and 1867 when their house had been let. Her last years were spent in England; living at Notting Hill but dying around 25 October 1888 at St. Leonards-on-Sea. They had no children.

From 1857, or perhaps earlier, he was the owner of "Woodside House", a 15-room home on 20 acres on Fullarton Road, Upper Mitcham which he irrigated, and which was later incorporated into Peter Waite's "Urrbrae". Banker Nathaniel Oldham (died 20 June 1888 at Semaphore) and family lived there from around 1867 to 1873 or later. It served as home and schoolhouse for the Rev. W. H. Mudie from 1876 to 1883.

Suffering ill-health, he travelled to England but returned without the improvement he had hoped for. He died at Woodside House in January 1867 and was buried at West Terrace Cemetery.

His estate included "Wongyarra", 320 acres of farmland near Mount Remarkable, and substantial warehouses and offices on Lipson Street and Divett Street, Port Adelaide.

George's brothers Robert Liddell Hall (ca.1809 – 5 March 1864) and Anthony Hall (ca.1813 – 23 August 1880) followed him to South Australia, Robert living at The Grange, Goodwood Road and Anthony at the Semaphore. Robert's son George Liddell Hall made newspaper headlines when he disappeared off Glenelg jetty on 5 January 1891.

== Recognition ==
Hall Street, Port Adelaide, near where he owned considerable property was probably named for him.

Mount Hall in the Northern Territory (18.515°S 134.004°E) was named for him by John McDouall Stuart in 1861.

The Hundred of Hall was named for him, and possibly the town of Halbury, located within that Hundred in the Mid North of South Australia.
