= South Australian Mining Association =

South Australian Mining Association was a no-liability company which established several mines in South Australia, notably the "Grey Wheal", or north mine at Burra, which made a fortune for its promoters, the "Snobs", while the adjacent southern claim, by the Princess Royal Company ("Nobs") proved worthless.

== History ==
The South Australian Mining Association (SAMA) was formed in 1841 following a letter to the South Australian newspapers by Johann Menge, extolling the mineral wealth which he believed lay under the soil, and later itemised. and discovery of silver-lead ore to the east of Adelaide, dubbed the Wheal Gawler mine. Shares were offered to the public. John Bentham Neales was agent and George Morphett the barrister for the Association, whose shares were under-subscribed, and whatever mining may have taken place was not newsworthy.

On 16 April 1845 the Association was resurrected, or a new one formed with the same name (it is not easy to determine which), as a no liability (or no-responsibility in the terminology of the day) company. At the land sales of 19 April 1845 the Association made a purchase adjoining Captain Bagot's property near Kapunda, and another on the River Torrens near Montacute.

Henry Mildred was appointed chairman; seven members of the Association were elected to form the board of management (three to be replaced each year). They were (in order of votes received) Emanuel Solomon, John Cundy Sleman (who left Australia in December 1846), Charles Beck, Samuel Stocks, jun., William Peacock, Jacob Hagen, George Bean. Other candidates were: (again in order of votes received) William Paxton, Matthew Smith, Thomas Whistler, Samuel Payne, Tom Cox Bray, Robert Sanders and Edward Castres Gwynne. The firm of Smart & Payne was appointed their solicitors and Henry Ayers secretary. Other subscribers were: J. Dickens, Michael Featherstone, J. B. Graham, G. S. Kingston, J. B. Neales, John Newman, Robert Pepperell, John Ridley, George Stevenson, ?? White. Other names were William Allen, Frederick John Beck, Joseph Bouch, James Bunce, (Edward?) Drew, Anthony Hall, John Hallett, James Hardman, James Masters, Christopher Septimus Penny, Henry Roach, John Slatter, Thomas Waterhouse.

Following a newspaper advertisement soliciting mineral samples, on 9 June 1845 William Strear brought samples of a rich copper ore into the office of Henry Ayers, the Association's secretary. Strear, a young shepherd employed by pastoralist James Stein, had walked the 90 miles (140 km) from Burra; a similar find was reported by Thomas Pickett, a bullock driver employed by William Robinson of Gum Creek, near Manoora. News of the discovery was published on 21 June in Adelaide newspapers, and the site was soon named The Monster Mine.

A Special Survey of 20,000 acres (81 km^{2}) of August 1845 on the Burra Creek was drawn up, and which was expected to encompass any potential mine sites. Two parties tendered for the mineral rights: the Association and the Princess Royal Company (dubbed the "Nobs", these were much wealthier individuals), whose members were George F. Aston, John Grainger, R. Boucher James, Charles Hervey Bagot, Francis S. Dutton and other proprietors of the Kapunda mine; two (unnamed) English investors; Thomas Shepherd, Joseph Johnson, and George Tinline. George Morphett acted as Chairman, E. A. Wright as Secretary. An amicable arrangement was made between these two groups: that each should pay half the £20,000 in specie demanded by Governor Grey, that the surveyed area should be divided in two, which was done on 20 September 1845, and by some means it was resolved that the Association should have the northern moiety and the Princess Royal Company the southern.

The Association wasted little time; they despatched ten Cornish miners, a blacksmith and a captain to the site and began blasting on 29 September, and soon bullock drays loaded with the red copper oxide ore were inching their way to Port Adelaide. Within seven months the Association had made a profit of £20,000; and £90,000 in the first eighteen months. Some shareholders sold up and returned to England with their new-found wealth; Emanuel Solomon realised £200 for every £5 share and went on to other projects, others held on and reaped enormous dividends every year until 1860. In the twelve months to 31 March 1848, 13,533 tons of ore was shipped. By 1 September 1848 every £5 share had earned £50 for its owner, and £315 in the 21 years before the Association was dissolved. Meanwhile, the economy of South Australia, which had been in the doldrums since George Grey became Governor of South Australia in 1841, recovered completely.

By March 1848 the number of men and boys working at the mine had risen to 567 and 13,533 tons of ore had been carted to the Port in the previous year by some eight hundred teamsters and between six and seven thousand bullocks. By 1851 there were 1013 working at the mine, and that year shipped 23,338 tons of ore, which would have yielded around 5,000 tons of copper metal, worth something over £450,000.

In September 1848 the miners, who were paid on the tribute system, went on strike over the way assay of their ore was handled. After a week, management met the strikers; Police were on hand but the meeting was orderly and the dispute was settled amicably. A few weeks later, management announced that wages of labourers and carters were to be reduced to 21s. per week, well below what had attracted them to Burra. This especially drew the ire of family men, who were already struggling with the hardships and high living expenses of Burra. The Association won out: the workers accepted the new contract and went back to work in early November. Burra Burra shares rallied to £129.

Around mid-1851 news of the gold finds in Victoria reached Burra, and in the year to 31 March 1852, two thirds of the workforce left to try their luck, but the Association still raised some 11,000 tons of ore, for a profit of £58,000. Most of the gold seekers returned disillusioned and eager to return to paid work. In this year the Monster Engine and its massive cast-iron pipework was installed, so that mining could continue below the water table. Keeping water out of the mines at depth remained a major engineering and financial problem.

A new prospect named the Karkulto Mine, 16 miles (26 km) south of Burra, near Emu Plains, was opened up in 1850. The SAMA and the Royal Mining Company each purchased a large block of land and commenced mining. The Royal Mining Company found some copper but more iron and soon exhausted its funds and the directors' patience. The SAMA abandoned the mine in 1869 without it ever showing a profit.

By 1867 the price of copper had dropped to £70 per ton; so low that digging the ore out was no longer profitable. An English expert, John Darlington, came out in 1868 and recommended that what had been a series of underground mines should be opened out to become an open-cut mine in order to recover at low cost the lower grade ore. This was commenced in 1870 and continued until the mine was closed in 1887, but the open cut yielded little or no ore. From 1867 to 1872 no ore was taken out, then captain Robert Sanders took over, and forked the water to the 70 fathom (420 feet (130 m)) level, whence it was pumped out, and mining continued for another five years, then on 14 September 1877 mining ceased and 250 men were unemployed. Captain Sanders secured a position with the Walhalla mine in Gippsland.

The Association continued to exist as an absentee landlord of many properties in Burra, and by its tough negotiating attitude acted as a brake on development of the town. Much of this property was offered at auction off by Bagot, Shakes & Lewis in 1904, but the reserve prices were so high that only a small fraction was sold and critical blocks adjoining the Burra Creek were held back. Another auction was held in 1912
