= Burra Broadcaster =

The Burra Broadcaster represents two iterations of a newspaper published in the town of Burra, South Australia, covering news and community events taking place in the Regional Council of Goyder area. Originally a print newspaper (issued 1991-2006), it was revived as a print/online newspaper in August 2013, taking over from the Mid North Broadcaster after that publication's closure earlier in June 2013.

== History ==
The Burra Community School began printing the Burra Community Newsletter in the 1980s, before Terry Wilson established the Burra Broadcaster newspaper (issued 1991-2006) and printing business in Burra. The Taylor Group purchased the business in 2005, and then created the Mid North Broadcaster, a publication released from 2006-2013. It was formed by the merger of struggling local newspapers, the Burra Broadcaster, the Peterborough Times (2003-2006), and the Eudunda Observer, with editorial control via the Murray Pioneer.

When the combined newspaper folded in June 2013, an independently run Burra Broadcaster was resurrected locally as an online and print newspaper by Michelle Osborn, who was previously a reporter for the Mid North Broadcaster.
