= John Benjamin Graham =

English settler in Australia and mineowner

John Benjamin Graham (8 March 1813 – 8 November 1876) was an English settler in the early days of South Australia, who became very wealthy thanks to his mining interests, then left the colony, but not before establishing a mansion for many years known as "Graham's Castle".

== History ==
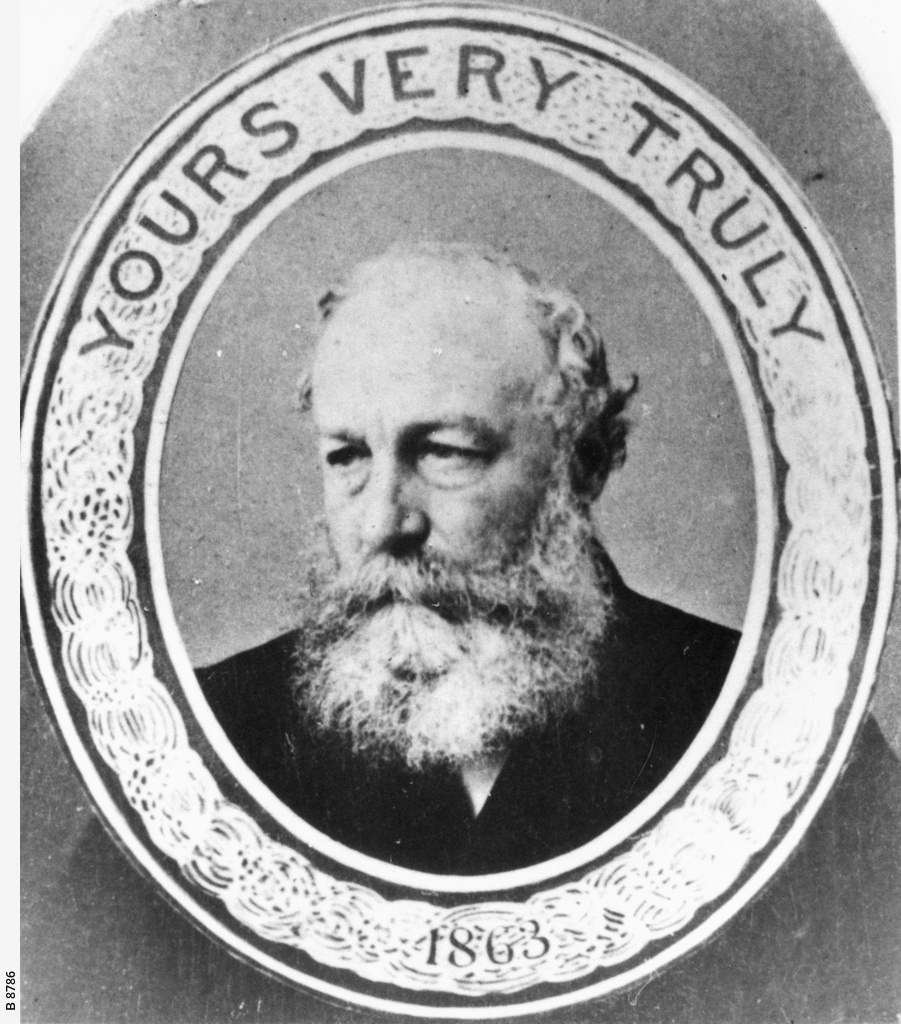
John Benjamin Graham

Graham grew up in Sheffield, England, and at age eighteen was apprenticed to an upholsterer in London. At his employer's urging and with £250 of his money to invest as well as £40 of his own, he emigrated to South Australia aboard Recovery, arriving in September 1839. He found work with an Adelaide ironmonger, but soon went into business on his own account and was quite successful.

Around 1845, after the discovery of copper at Burra Burra, he invested all his savings in South Australian Mining Association ("Snobs") shares, which repaid him handsomely: soon he was S.A.M.A.'s largest shareholder, with £1,090 in £5 shares, roughly 9% of the original total shareholding of £12,320, having presumably purchased additional scrip from early profit takers. Directors (all major shareholders) were Charles Beck, James Bunce, John Benjamin Graham, John Bentham Neales, William Paxton, William Peacock, Charles Septimus Penny, Emanuel Solomon, and Samuel Stocks, jun., with (later Sir) Henry Ayers as secretary. In two years he was in receipt of £16,000 in dividends per annum, tens of millions of dollars in today's currency.

=== Prospect House ===
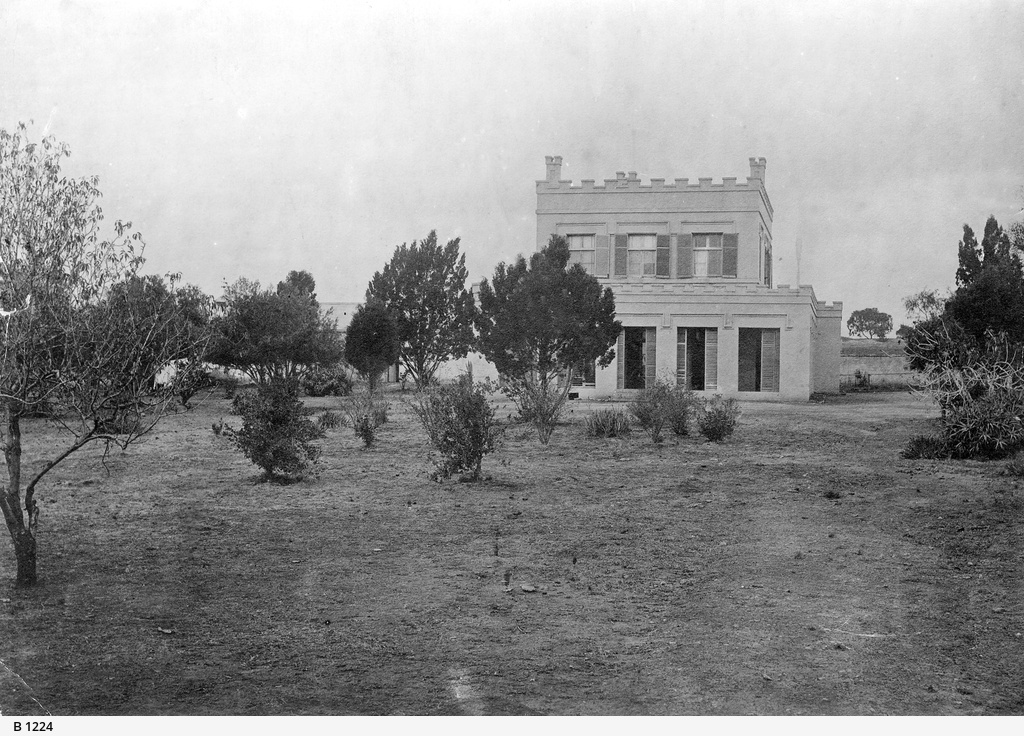
Prospect House "Graham's Castle" c. 1860

In 1846 Graham purchased a 52 acres (21 ha) property, on the Lower North Road (now Prospect Road) in the suburb of Prospect, previously owned by John and Maria Richmond.

John Richmond (died 23 June 1862), with his wife Maria née Urquhart (died 1 April 1845) arrived in South Australia aboard Ariadne August 1839, with their family: Mary Ann Richmond (1828–1920) later Gregorson then Duncan; Agnes Muir Richmond (1831–1924); John Richmond (c. 1836-1886); and Maria Richmond ( –1858) later Thomson.
They built a stone cottage on their large property, Section 372 on the Lower North Road (now Prospect Road), Prospect, then moved to a property which they dubbed "Glen Urquhart" of some 300 acres (1.2 km^{2}) at the Torrens Gorge.

He erected a 3-metre-high stone fence, and engaged architect Thomas Price to build for him an opulent mansion of 30 rooms, dwarfing every other pile in the city, including Government House.

Thomas Price was an architect and surveyor from Wales, who briefly had a practice in Melbourne, then from 1846 to 1852 in Adelaide. He may not have been notable as an architect, but was certainly prolific. He laid out some 17 townships, most now being residential suburbs east of Adelaide, and designed numerous shops and houses, several hotels, a grandstand for the "Old Racecourse" (now Victoria Park), and a 50-cottage housing estate between Waymouth and Franklin streets. His two most significant buildings were the New Queen's Theatre for George Coppin and Prospect House for John Benjamin Graham.

Tenders were called on 22 August 1846 to build a ten feet (3.0 metres) high limestone wall around four acres of the property and three weeks later tenders were invited from various trades to build the mansion, followed by tenders for coachhouse, and stables. It is likely, but not certain, that the Richmonds' cottage was retained, perhaps as servants' quarters.

Prospect House was Adelaide's first Gothic Revival mansion, and designed to be impressive. It was box-like of two storeys, the upper floor being of a smaller plan than the ground floor. It reputedly had thirty rooms, and was built of coursed local limestone. It had a wide west-facing veranda with a return to its north side. Rooms on the upper floor opened via French windows with green-painted cedar shutters onto a crenellated open balcony. The veranda was also enclosed by shutters. The flat roof, which was accessible from below and surrounded by a crenellated parapet, gave a panoramic view of the Adelaide plains from the sea to the Adelaide Hills and beyond. Even the chimneys were crenellated, reinforcing the popular epithet "castle". The interior was spacious and impressive, with polished oak and cedar panelling and marble inlays. The thirty rooms included a wide hall and a dining room with eight doors running on little wheels which fitted into recesses in the wall, and a panelled partition which folded back to make two large rooms into an immense one. The building, which dwarfed every other mansion in the colony, including Government House, loudly proclaimed its owner's wealth, though not necessarily exemplifying good taste.

A. T. Saunders warns against confusing Prospect House with John Howard Angas's Prospect Lodge, on the Torrens Road corner, Bowden, opposite the Park Lands.

=== Return to England ===
Around 1847 he brought his mother and stepfather, John Adams, out to South Australia, and had them living with him at Prospect House, presumably as caretakers against the event of Graham's return to Adelaide; this notion is supported by an entry in his diary.

In January 1848 he left Adelaide aboard Gellert for Calcutta, and toured the East and Europe before settling in England.

From 1848 to 1867 Henry Ayers served as his agent in South Australia, followed by his brothers-in-law Frank and Henry Rymill. He returned briefly to Adelaide aboard European in March 1858, when he resigned as a director of the Burra Burra Association. Investments in South Australia included the Canowie and Curnamona Stations in 1869, which were sold in 1926.

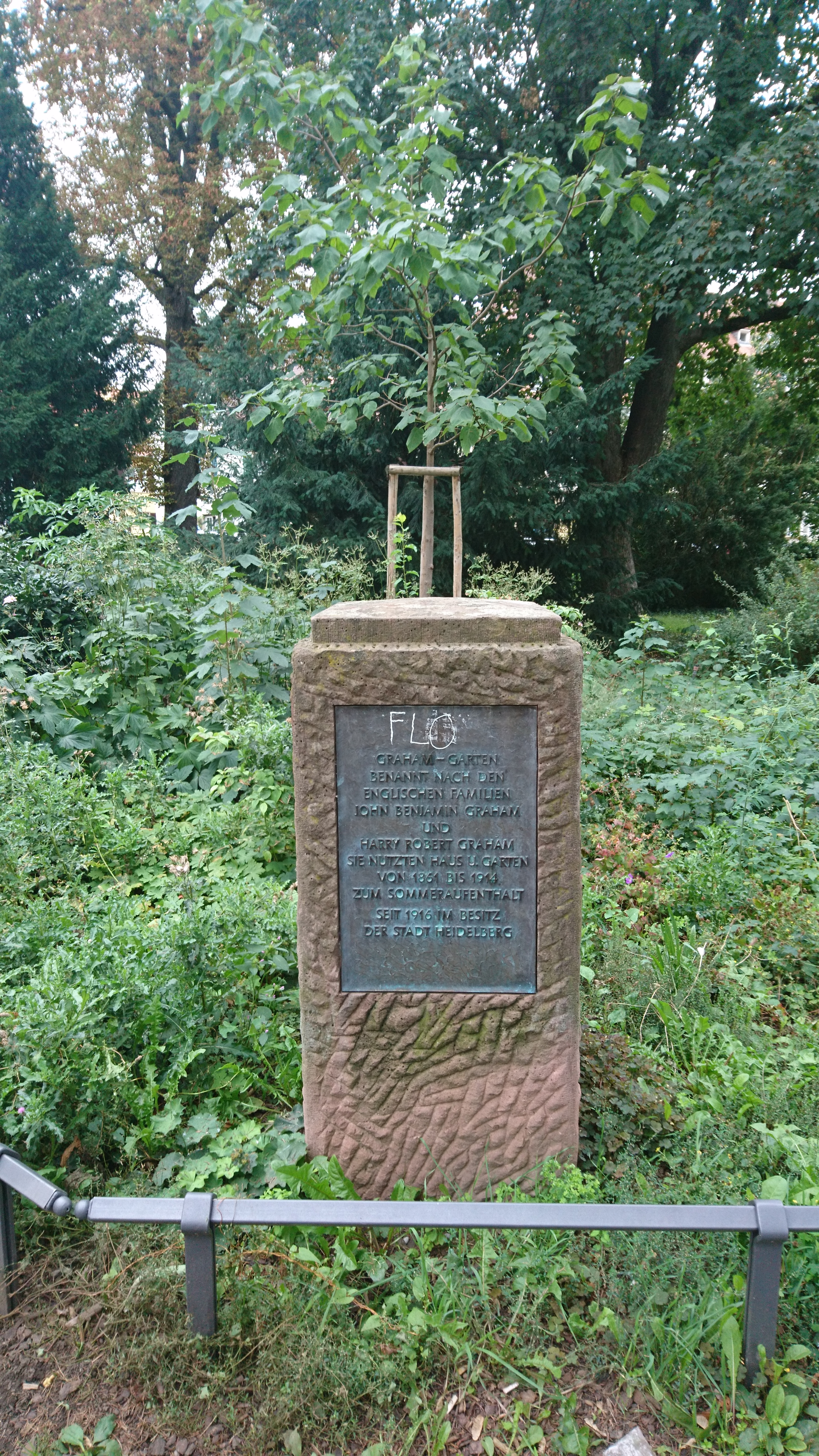

He purchased a Schloss in Handschuhsheim, near Heidelberg, where he resided from around 1855, and was known for his gracious and lavish hospitality.

He died at his residence, Warrior Square, St Leonards-on-Sea on 8 November 1876, with an estate estimated at £200,000.

== Family ==
Graham married Louisa Rymill, eldest daughter of Robert Rymill, of Brompton Row, near London, on 10 April 1849. Louisa was a sister of Henry and Frank Rymill; it was at her urging that they arrived in Adelaide aboard Caucasian in October 1855.

- Harry Robert Graham (1850 – 11 January 1933), eldest son was a successful scholar at Oxford A caricature by Sir Leslie Ward ("Spy") was published in Vanity Fair on 11 May 1893. He was elected a Member of Parliament for St. Pancras West. He never married.
- Louisa Maude Graham (1851–1924) married Edward Samuel Hamersley (1839 – 11 January 1909) of Pyrton Manor, Watlington in 1878. He was a nephew of Edward Hamersley (senior) (1810–1874). She was his second wife.
- Frederick Malcolm "Fred" Graham (1856 – 8 May 1911) married Annabella Stewart "Anna" Butterworth (c. – 28 September 1894) on 16 February 1887. They purchased her father John Butterworth's property, Bungala House (which still stands) near Yankalilla. He married again, in 1896, to Marion Elizabeth Mayfield ( – 2 February 1951) on 18 February 1896. Their two sons and four daughters included:

- John Benjamin Graham MC AFC (1888 – ) was an airman, decorated during WWI, retired 1939.
- Marion Louisa Graham (1897– )
- Harry Robert Graham (1900 – )
- Lilian Florence Graham (1905– )

== Later history of "Graham's Castle" ==
Approximate bounds of Graham's property. Castle Avenue is the unlabeled street that intersects Graham Place. Prospect Road (prev. Lower North Road) is at far right.

Graham's stepfather John Adams remained at Prospect House, hosting a Christmas party for Sunday School children at Prospect House, and a fete in honor of the consecration of Christ Church, which was recorded on watercolors by S. T. Gill. A similar occasion the following year was marred by a self-selected elite who blocked the Sunday School teachers from the dining room until all the drinks and party food was gone. Adams announced his imminent return to England in June 1853. He organised a sale of Graham's movable assets including his pipe organ, (brought out from England by John Richmond) which was purchased for Christ Church, North Adelaide, and later went to the Norwood Baptist Church.

- W. H. Clark purchased the property for £4,300 in 1853.
- Dr. James Bathe (c. 1815–1885), a noted horse breeder, sold the property in 1870, returned to Victoria. His son William Nicholas M. de Bathe (c. 1846 – 4 December 1868) was a member of B. T. Finniss's 1864 expedition to Escape Cliffs, Northern Territory.
- John Whinham's North Adelaide Grammar School students boarded there, and his wife Mary Whinham died there in 1891.

"Graham's Castle" had the reputation of being haunted by a sailor, supposedly an earlier owner of the property. It turned out rabbits were living under the floorboards, giving rise to occasional unexplained noises.

By the 20th century suburbia had encroached and the "Castle" was just an unmarketable curiosity off Braund Road, Prospect, and in the way of progress, and was demolished in September 2001. No plan of "Prospect House" survives and apart from a few street names, no evidence of its existence remains.

== See also ==
John Benjamin Graham on the German Wikipedia.
