= Redruth Gaol =

Heritage listed museum in South Australia

Coordinates: 33.6645°S 138.9330°E

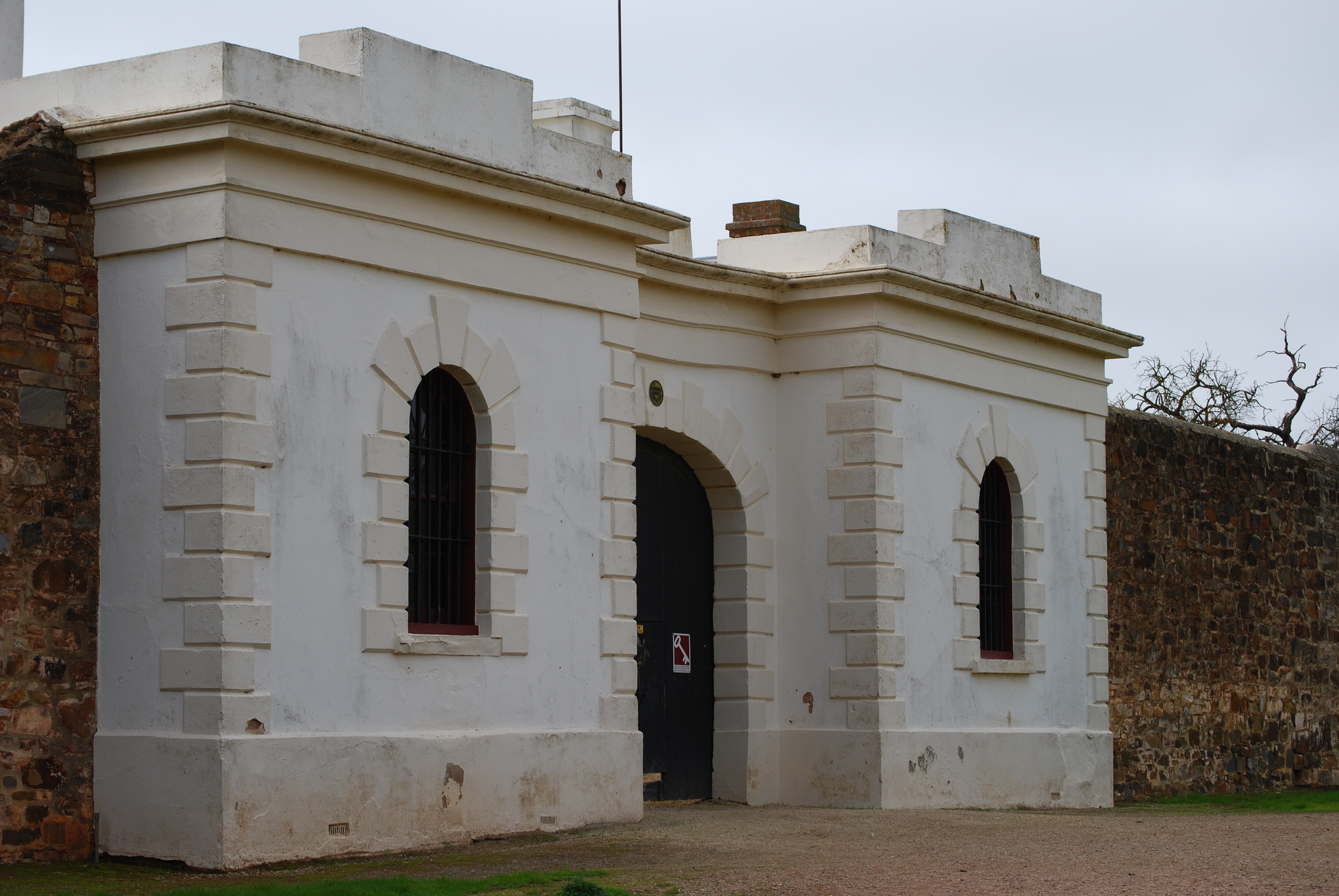
Redruth Gaol

Redruth Gaol (later the Redruth Reformatory) is a historic former prison in Burra, South Australia, now operating as a museum. It was the first prison in South Australia to be built outside of the state capital, Adelaide.

The gaol was built in 1856. It was reported in January 1866 that it contained no prisoners, despite being an active prison. In 1871, it was gazetted as the place of confinement for persons arrested on warrants from the Local Courts of Redruth, Clare, Riverton and Auburn, with Georgetown added in 1874. In 1876, it had problems with overcrowding, with 22 prisoners in a total of only eight cells. It was reported in 1879, at the time of the construction of the Gladstone Gaol, that Redruth was too small and in a poor state of repair. By 1894, Redruth Gaol had again received little use for some time, and was costing £370 per annum despite holding only three prisoners; as such, the decision was made to close the prison in that year. Prisoners north of Burra were sent to Gladstone, while prisoners south of Burra were sent to Adelaide.

It was reopened as a girls reformatory in 1897. The reformatory was closed in 1922, when Acting Premier John George Bice declared that it was "entirely inadequate for its purpose." The residents were moved to a Salvation Army home in the Adelaide suburb of Enfield. The reformatory had seen a number of problems prior to its closure, with the matron reprimanded in 1920 following complaints about its management, and an inmate riot in February 1921; by July 1921, it only held 13 inmates.

It was used for the filming of the 1980 movie Breaker Morant. The building was restored in the late 1980s, with the National Trust of Australia and the Commonwealth Bank funding the renovations as an Australian Bicentenary project. It was subsequently opened as a museum containing various historical displays. It is open to the public as part of the Burra Heritage Passport tour, with the site operated by the National Trust.

It was listed on the South Australian Heritage Register on 24 July 1980 and on the former Register of the National Estate on 21 March 1978.
