= Samuel Stocks =

Businessman early in the life of the colony of South Australia

- Born: c. 1786; England
- Died: 8 March 1863 (aged 76–77); Prospect, South Australia
- Occupation: Businessman
- Spouses: Barbara (died January 1868); Frances Driver (nee Hawson) (m. 1858)
- Family: Samuel Stocks, jun. (son)

Samuel Stocks (c. 1786 – 8 March 1863) and his son Samuel Stocks, jun. were businessmen in the early days of the Colony of South Australia.

Stocks was a citizen of Heaton Mersey, near Manchester, where he was senior partner of the bleaching firm of Stocks and Tait which failed during the Panic of 1847. He contested, unsuccessfully, the parliamentary seat of Stockport before migrating to South Australia. He arrived in Adelaide via Sydney on the Dorset on 27 August 1843. At some stage he returned to England and arrived back in Adelaide with his wife Barbara on the Zealous on 26 May 1848.

He was a dedicated churchman; secretary of Christchurch Sunday School, and a member of the Diocesan Synod.

He was appointed to the Destitute Board in 1852.

== Family ==
In later life he married Frances Driver (née Hawson, ca.1825 – 9 March 1873) widow of Charles John Driver ( – 7 January 1854) on 29 June 1858. Details of any earlier marriage(s) are not yet available. His children included:

- Samuel Stocks, jun. (c. 1812 – 3 February 1850)
- Thomas Parker Stocks (c. 1826 – 20 December 1853) died of consumption

He died of "English cholera" (dysentery).

== Recognition ==
His portrait was captured in caricature by S. T. Gill.
