= Burra, South Australia =

Burra
- Town
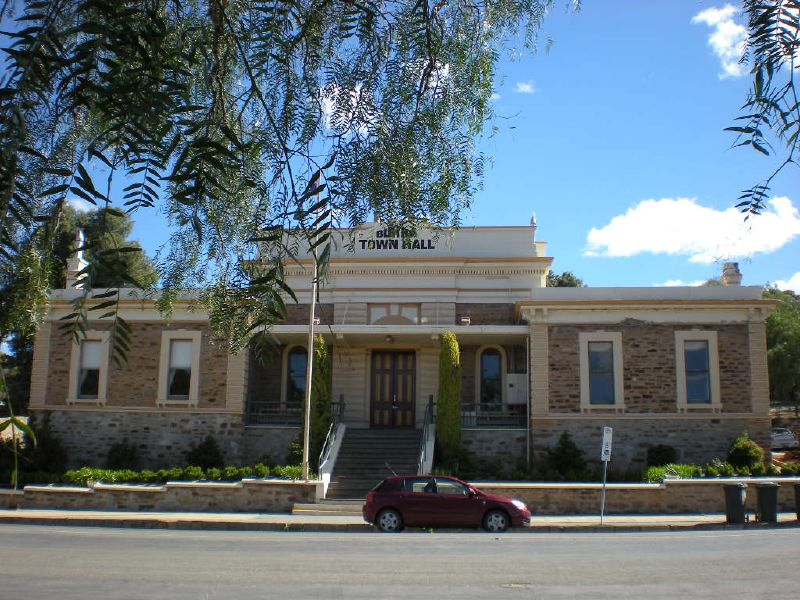
- Burra Town Hall

- Coordinates: 33°40′0″S 138°56′0″E
- Country: Australia
- State: South Australia
- LGA: Regional Council of Goyder
- Location: 156 km (97 mi) north of Adelaide; 121 km (75 mi) south-east of Port Pirie; 121 km (75 mi) north-west of Renmark
- Established: 1845

Government
  - State electorate: Stuart
  - Federal division: Grey
- Elevation: 474 m (1,555 ft)

Population
  - Total: 922 (UCL 2021)
- Postcode: 5417
Localities around Burra
Booborowie	Mount Bryan	Mount Bryan East
Leighton; Gum Creek; Hanson	Burra	Mongolata; Baldina; Worlds End
Porter Lagoon; Koonoona	Emu Downs	Hallelujah Hills

Burra is a pastoral centre and historic tourist town in the mid-north of South Australia. It lies east of the Clare Valley in the Bald Hills range, part of the northern Mount Lofty Ranges, and on Burra Creek.

The town began as a single company mining township that, by 1851, was a set of townships (company, private, and government-owned) collectively known as "The Burra". The Burra mines supplied 89% of South Australia's and 5% of the world's copper for 15 years, and the settlement has been credited (along with the mines at Kapunda) with saving the economy of the struggling new colony of South Australia. The Burra Burra Copper Mine was established in 1848 mining the copper deposit discovered in 1845. Miners and townspeople migrated to Burra primarily from Cornwall, Wales, Scotland, and Germany. The mine first closed in 1877, briefly opened again early in the 20th century and for a last time from 1970 to 1981. The historic townships of Kooringa, Llwchwr, Aberdeen, New Aberdeen, and Graham were included as part of Burra township proper in July 1940.

When the mine was exhausted and closed the population shrank dramatically and the townships, for the next 100 years, supported pastoral and agricultural activities. Today the town continues as a centre for its surrounding farming communities and, being one of the best-preserved towns of the Victorian era in Australia, as a historic tourist centre.

The Burra Charter, which outlines the best practice standard for cultural heritage management in Australia, is named for a conference held here in 1979 by Australia ICOMOS (International Council on Monuments and Sites) where the document was adopted.

== Etymology ==
The name applied to what is now the town of Burra has changed over time. The Burra Burra Copper Mine was named after the Burra Burra Creek that flows through the town. From at least 1851 the collection of townships near the mine became referred to as "The Burra". The town of Burra was officially formed in 1940 by a notice in the South Australian Government Gazette with the consolidation of the mostly culturally based townships of Redruth, Aberdeen, New Aberdeen, Hampton, Copperhouse, Kooringa, Llwchwr, and Lostwithiel.

The name Burra Burra has been asserted to have come from numerous sources. As early as July 1843, when the locality was already a sheep outstation for pastoralist William Peter of Manoora, it was known as Burrow Creek. Despite that obvious (though misspelt) connection to the indigenous Ngadjuri people, a later theory persistently postulates that it comes from the Hindustani for 'great great', used by Indians shepherds working for another early pastoralist, James Stein, to refer to creek. The name could also have come from Stein's home country of Scotland or a number of Aboriginal languages. A so-called 'English Burra Burra' was discovered in 1851 in Devon in the Cornwall and West Devon Mining Landscape; possibly coincidentally several ancient placenames such as Burrator in Devon and Burraton in Cornwall occur nearby; also possible origins for the name. A Burra Burra mine is located in Tennessee and named after the Australian one.

== Geology and geography ==
Historical population
Year	Pop.	±%
1921	1,777	—
1933	1,625	−8.6%
1947	1,520	−6.5%
1954	1,428	−6.1%
1961	1,382	−3.2%
1966	1,342	−2.9%
1971	1,276	−4.9%
1976	1,201	−5.9%
1981	1,222	+1.7%
1986	1,187	−2.9%
1991	1,191	+0.3%
1996	1,008	−15.4%
2001	1,097	+8.8%
2006	978	−10.8%
2011	893	−8.7%
2016	907	+1.6%
2021	922	+1.7%
Source: Australian Bureau of Statistics data.

Burra is located within the Hundred of Kooringa a few kilometres inside Goyder's Line, near Burra, Baldina and Gum creeks. The lies within the Temperate Grassland of South Australia.

The main body of copper ore formed between two geological faults in broken dolomite rocks. The ore body was up to 70 metres (230 ft) wide and mainly consisted of green malachite and blue azurite veins and nodules amongst the host rock. The malachite and azurite were formed from copper sulphide minerals, by a process known as "secondary enrichment". This process took millions of years to convert the low grade copper sulphide ore, which was probably created 300 to 400 millions of years ago during the last period of vulcanism near Burra.

== Early history ==
=== Original inhabitants ===
The original inhabitants of the Burra area were the Ngadjuri Aboriginal people whose first Western contact was in 1839. The first European squatter in this region was William Peter, whose head station was Gum Creek near Manoora. Pastoralists grazed much of the Ngadjuri land from the 1840s and, although there was conflict, Ngadjuri people worked as shepherds and wool scourers, particularly once the area was emptied during the gold rushes of the 1850s. Their population was seriously depleted by introduced European diseases and they were reported to be extinct by 1878. Traces remain with rock art and burial sites in the area and some people able to claim Ngadjuri ancestry.

=== Discovery of copper ===
On 9 June 1845 William Streair bore samples of a rich copper ore into the office of Henry Ayers, secretary of the South Australian Mining Association (SAMA). Streair, a young shepherd in the employ of local pastoralist James Stein, had walked the 90 miles from Burra as did Thomas Pickett, a shepherd on a neighbouring property who made a further find. News of the copper this heralded was published on 21 June in Adelaide newspapers, and the site was soon named The Monster Mine.

Governor George Grey had amended land grant regulations forcing the hundred of Kooringa to be a 20,000-acre (8,100 ha) rectangle, placing the two copper finds at opposite ends. Due to the £20,000 (sterling) price of the land it was divided in two, with each half sold to a different group and the division decided by lot. The surveyed area was named the Burra Creek Special Survey. It is 8 by 4 miles (12.9 by 6.4 km), divided into two squares, 4 miles to a side. A group of wealthy capitalists (known as "the nobs") purchased the southern half of the division and a group of shopkeepers, merchants and SAMA (collectively known as "the snobs") the northern half.

The Burra Burra Mine was established by the snobs in their northern selection, the Princess Royal Mine by the nobs in their southern. In 1846, 347 acres (140 ha) just north of the division was sold to the Scottish Australian Investment Company for £5,550 where they established the Bon Accord Mine. Mining began on 29 September 1845 with the first gunpowder charge set off on the monster Burra Burra copper lode and by mid-1846, the Bon Accord Mining Company had also commenced operations.

== Pastoral activity ==
From as early as 1843 shepherding had been common around Burra, with pastoral pioneers such as James Stein and William Peter being granted grazing rights for their flocks on unsurveyed land. Over the life of the Burra Mine, most food was brought in as there was no freehold offered by SAMA on the land and no adjoining hundreds were declared until 1860. Agriculture was delayed by the slow surveying of hundreds, as until these had been done there was no freehold or leasehold land but only grazing rights. As Burra lies almost on Goyder's 1865 line it is rated at the edge of marginal land for farming. After mining the town became a pastoral centre, and South Australia's main sheep trading centre until the mid-20th century.

The Baldina Run, a major sheep station of 50 mi^{2} (130 km^{2}) some 10 mi (16 km) east of Burra, near Kooringa, was established by Henry Ayers in 1851, leased by J and C. B. Fisher until 1862, then taken over by Alfred Barker, son-in-law of James Chambers.

== Mining ==
=== Burra Burra or "Monster Mine" ===
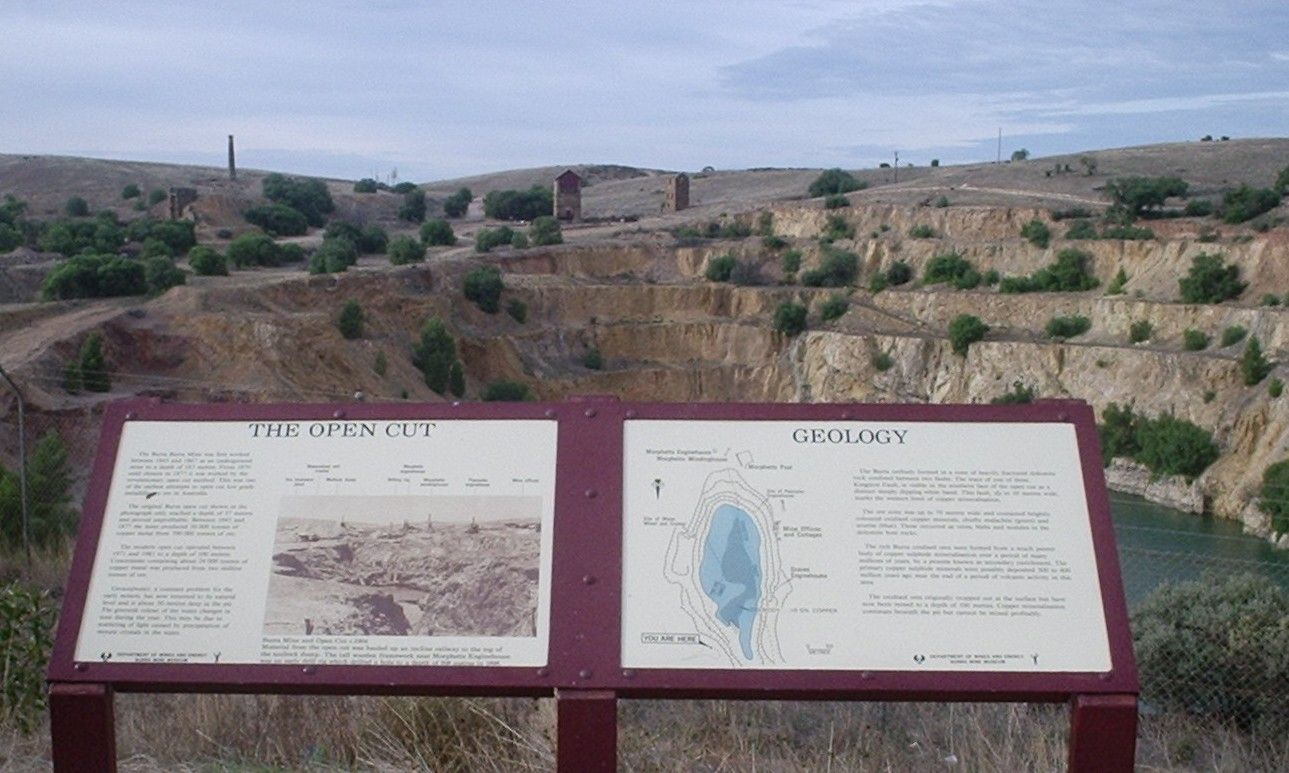
Burra Burra open cut mine pit. Original working buildings in the background

Until 1860 the mine was the largest metals mine in Australia. From 1845 to 1877 the mine produced approximately 50,000 tonnes of copper. The mine was reopened as a modern open cut in 1971, operating for a decade with 24,000 tonnes of copper extracted. The mine's Adelaide operation was run by Henry Ayers, secretary of SAMA, from its opening until the 1890s. Henry Roach was chief Captain, responsible for day-to-day operations, from 1847 until his retirement in 1868. The investors had put up a total of £12,320 of which £10,000 was spent purchasing the land. The first dividend was paid on 24 June 1847 and by 1 December 1847 the mine had returned total dividends of £49,280. Over the mine's 32-year life, less than 100 shareholders received £826,586 in mining dividends. All mining dividends stopped after the mine closed in 1877, with the mine area sold in 1902 and the last property of SAMA in Kooringa sold in 1914. A final dividend was paid on 5 May 1916 and SAMA was wound up and closed.

Most of the copper was for sale to India as it was taking over a third of world copper supply in the mid-19th century. Due to the lack of smelting in South Australia, copper ore was initially shipped to Cornwall. The company purchased a Cornish beam engine which was the first in Australia when erected in 1848. Due to the uneconomic state of the mine, in 1868 a decision made to open cut the mine. Mining ceased underground, having reached a depth of 183 metres (600 ft) and open-cut operations starting in 1870 although, over the remaining life of the mine, small underground operations extracted more ore than the expensive open cut.

Over the life of the mine, Henry Ayers jealously preserved shareholder profits by ruthlessly controlling wages and expenses. In October 1846 this caused the first strike, of masons and bricklayers, with the company refusing to pay more than 8 shillings per day. With declining copper prices (from £91 per ton in 1845 to £87 in 1848) the company continually sought to reduce wages. In August 1847 the company enticed Thomas Burr to take over as general manager, he having resigned his post as Deputy Surveyor General of South Australia, but by September 1848 the unsatisfied company directors had sacked him. By 1848 the wages reached their lowest level, which precipitated the Burra miners' strike, being the first industrial strike in South Australia and earliest workers' strike of any consequence in Australia. The strike came and went numerous times, with miners not completely returning to work until January 1849.

By April 1848 the mine was employing 567 people and supporting a population of 1,500 in the township of Kooringa. Employment at the mine peaked at 1,208 in 1859 and declined continuously until the mine's closure in 1877. In November 1877 most of the remaining disposable equipment and stores were sold off and mining by SAMA ceased.

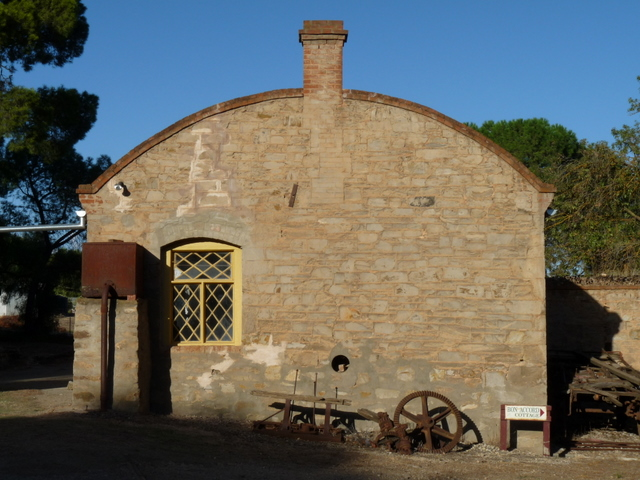
The main building at the Bon Accord copper mine at Burra, South Australia, 2010.

=== Bon Accord Mine ===
The Bon Accord Mining Company was formed on behalf of Scottish speculators, in the expectation that the Burra lode would extend under the properties boundary. No extension was found and, to recoup money, the townships of Aberdeen (1849) and New Aberdeen (1872) were formed on company land. Stoppage of pumping at the Burra Burra Mine in 1877 caused a rise in the water level in the neighbouring Bon Accord Mine forcing it to also close. Mining activity lasted from 1846 until 1849, was restarted in 1858 and finally ceased four years later with no orebody having been discovered. Many of the mine's buildings remain and are preserved by the National Trust of South Australia as a museum.

=== Princess Royal Mine ===
The Princess Royal Mine was never successful, and in June 1859 the Princess Royal Mining Company closed its doors. During its brief life the mine produced 468 long tons (476 t) of copper worth £6,500 from 888 long tons (902 t) of ore. The mine and surrounding 10,000 acres (4,000 ha) of then pastoral land was auctioned on 24 April 1860.

== Development of the town ==
During a visit in October 1845 to Burra by Henry Ayers and the directors of SAMA the site of the township of Kooringa was chosen. George Strickland Kingston surveyed and laid out the township, completing it in April 1846, and named many of the streets after directors of SAMA. From the beginning the township was a company town, built at low cost and with insufficient housing, which forced many miners to dig makeshift homes.

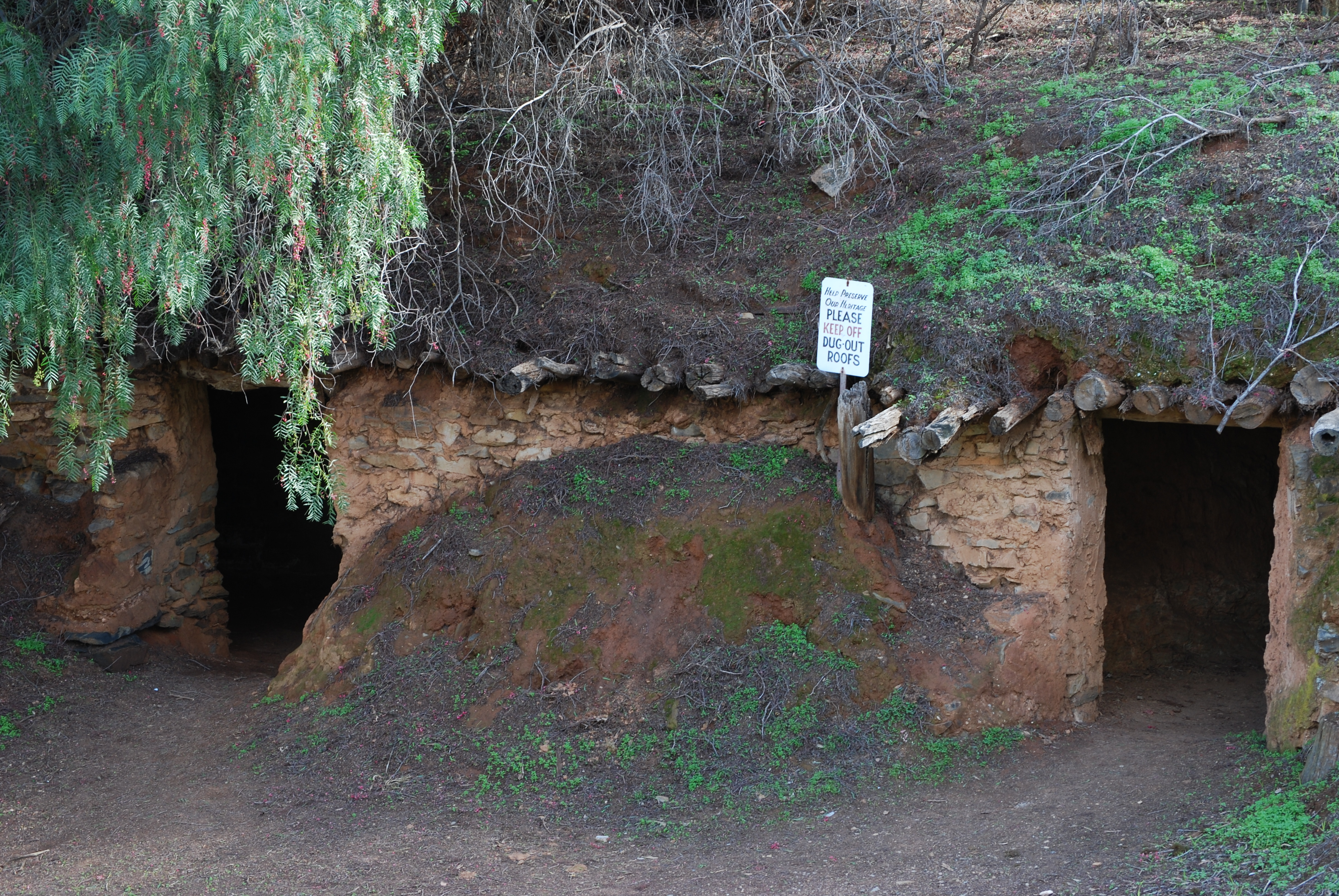
Dugouts along the creek, used by a third of the population in 1851

In the census of 1851 over a third of the population were living along the creek and the census compiler took time to note:"There are no houses, the dwellings being excavated in the banks of the Burra Creek."

Largely due to the company nature of the settlement, development was slow, with the first bank not opening until 1859. Until the National Bank established the first branch in Kooringa, most exchange was either in the form of company scrip or at shops operating as money exchanges. All towns, except Kooringa, were built outside the mining lease but were still close to the mine as it was at the northern edge of the lease. The formation of the townships was forced by the refusal of SAMA to grant any freeholds within Kooringa, so miners began moving into other townships from the end of 1849. During their early lives, each of the townships largely had their own hotels, churches, post offices, schools, and shops and identity. In 1851 the gold rush near Bathurst, New South Wales, emptied the town of many miners. Whole families, government officials and other townspeople left for the gold fields and by 1854 the town appeared largely deserted. The number of townships increased dramatically as a result of an 1858 proposal to extend a railway line from Gawler. When the railway failed to be built most of the new townships failed and, in 1876, the remaining townships formed the Corporation of Burra.

In September 1846 the townships had their first police force with the movement of four constables from Julia Creek to the south into temporary accommodation provided by SAMA. Permanent lockup cells and stables were completed in Redruth mid-1847. In September that year, William Lang was appointed resident magistrate and coroner for the Murray District and initially housed in a company cottage in Kooringa. The first hotel was a temporary wooden structure erected at the entrance to the township of Kooringa in mid-1846, and the first permanent hotel was the Burra Hotel (opened 25 September 1847) built by William Paxton, a SAMA director and original owner of Ayers House. The Burra Hotel became the town's first public hospital in 1878 and was demolished in 1968.

Burra's first parliamentary representative was George Strickland "Paddy" Kingston who was elected in 1851 to the first legislative council as member for Burra and Clare, and for the same area to the house of assembly in its first parliament of 1857.

Piped water was supplied from 1884 from the flooded and abandoned Bon Accord Mine with water reaching 100 houses by 1885. This was the primary source for Burra until 1966 when it was replaced with water piped from the Murray River. The Burra received its first supply of electricity on 27 March 1924 from the newly formed Burra electric supply company.

Burra's population has declined from a peak of 5,000 in 1851 to a present figure of approximately 1,000 in 1986. The dramatic decrease at the end of mining inhibited expansion and helped preserve many of the original buildings and houses.

=== Governance and townships ===
The District Council of Burra was proclaimed in 1872, the Town Corporation in 1876 and in 1969 the District Council and Town Corporation were amalgamated.

In 1876 the individual townships of Redruth, Llwchwr, Aberdeen, Graham, and Hampton were consolidated as the Corporation of the Town of Burra, but retained their identities and names. In July 1940, he historic Burra neighbourhoods of Kooringa, Llwchwr, Aberdeen, New Aberdeen, and Graham ceased to be separately recognised and were included and renamed as part of Burra township proper. Redruth was renamed "Burra North" at that time; it would eventually be merged with Burra as well.

The townships of Copperhouse, Hampton, and Nelson were not included in the 1940 proclamation forming the town of Burra, as they had become ghost towns. Other townships that either never succeeded or had been abandoned by 1940 were Princesstown, Lostwithiel, Westbury, Roachtown, Yarwood, Millertown, Warrapoota and Clonmel.

==== Graham ====
The township of Graham was laid out in 1874 and comprised only 21 allotments on six acres. It was named after J. B. Graham, the largest shareholder in the Mining Association.

==== Redruth ====
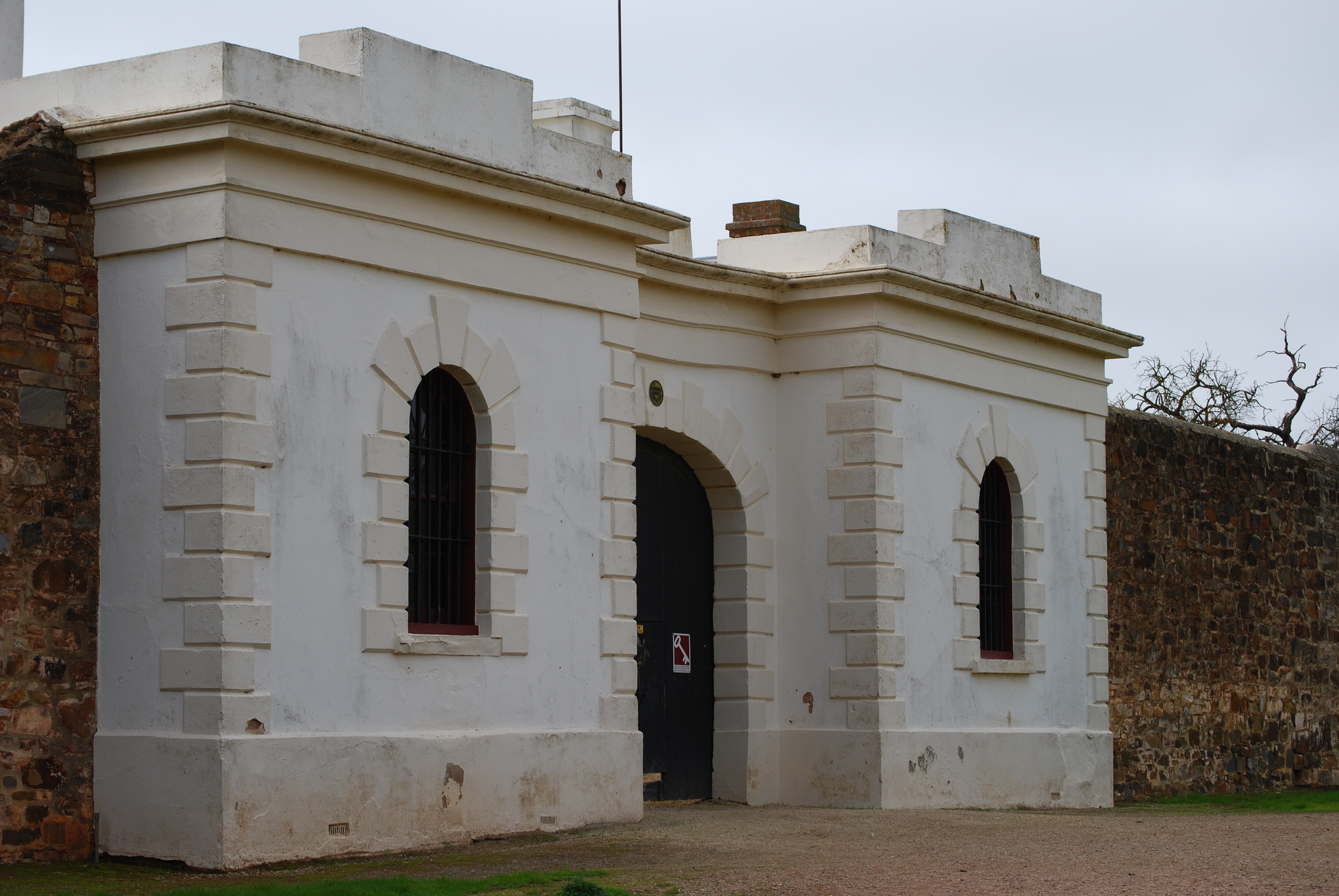
Redruth Gaol, used in the film Breaker Morant

Redruth was a government township formed in 1850 to break SAMA's monopoly. It is named after Redruth in Cornwall and its streets are named after Cornish mining towns. The township was the site of all original government buildings (courthouse, jail and police station). The courthouse was erected in 1857, and Redruth Gaol, built in 1856, was the first country jail in South Australia. From 1897 to 1922, the jail was used as a girls' reformatory. SAMA delayed building in Redruth when they bought 77 of the 120 lots on offer at the initial land auction, paying almost 20 times the overall reserve price.

==== Kooringa ====
Kooringa was the first company township in Australia and, until the closure of the mine, was maintained as a strictly company-run town. The township's name is derived from the Aboriginal word kuri-ngga meaning either in the circle or locality of the sheoak. During the life of the Burra Burra Mine, the township was widely reported as shabby, rundown, and poorly maintained, with the inhabitants having little incentive to maintain their rented properties. Kooringa is still the main section of the town and is known as Burra South.

==== Llwchwr ====
Llwchwr, sometimes spellt Llychwr, was built by the Patent Copper Company (later the English and Australian Copper Company) to avoid the need to ship all of the ore to Wales. The streets are named after those in Llwchwr, Wales and other nearby villages. In May 1848, the company had imported from Swansea the entire smelting works comprising men, materials, tools, staff and families. Smelting was reported to be in operation by May 1849.

==== Aberdeen and New Aberdeen ====
In 1846 a group of speculators from Scotland formed the Bon Accord Mining Company, purchasing a section of land on the northern boundary of the special survey, hoping that the ore body extended under the boundary. Due to the lack of success in mining company, land near the mine was subdivided in 1849 forming Aberdeen (named after the east coastal city of Aberdeen in Scotland), with the company seeking to recoup some of their investment. Streets were named to honour directors of the Bon Accord Mining Company and the retention of mineral rights by the company prevented SAMA from acquiring the land, as they had in Redruth. New Aberdeen was subdivided after 1872 arrival of the railway line from Kapunda, and most of the early buildings in the two townships were constructed in the three years following.

== Railway ==
The broad-gauge railway eventually went through Burra, to reach a break of gauge station further north at Terowie.

Burra railway station is 1,555 feet (474 m) above sea level and 112 miles (180 km) from Adelaide. It was erected in 1883, replacing the original building. Regular passenger services ended at the end of 1986, with the last passenger train being an ARHS steam train on 19 September 1992. The last light engines ran to Burra in 2004, with the line being formally closed.

After falling into disrepair, the station building has been renovated for use as a visitor centre and B&B.

== Media ==
The Burra Record was a newspaper covering Burra and the mid-north eastern area. The Burra Record had begun life as the Northern Mail, the town's first publication, which was first published on 30 June 1876. After 26 weekly issues, in 1877, it was renamed to Burra News and Northern Mail, before being renamed again in July 1878. In 1977, it merged with the Review-Times to form the Review-Times-Record, which in turn became The Flinders News in 1989.

Another publication was the County Light Times, produced in the town from 3 March 1949 to 22 February 1951. Published by Harold Du Rieue, the newspaper's coverage included the districts of Riverton, Tarlee, Rhynie and Saddleworth.

Burra was also home to the Mid North Broadcaster, a publication released from 2006 to 2013. It was formed by the merger of struggling local newspapers, the Peterborough Times (2003–2006), the Burra Broadcaster (1991–2006), and the Eudunda Observer. It was owned by the Taylor group, with editorial control via the Murray Pioneer. Its distribution included the towns of Burra, Eudunda, Jamestown, and Peterborough.

== Burra today ==
Burra today is an important regional centre for surrounding farming communities and a historic tourist destination. From its 1994 declaration as a State Heritage Town, tourism has grown to an estimate of 41,000 visitors in 2000. While many visitors are day-trippers and are from Adelaide, over 40% of the visitors come from outside South Australia and over 50% stay overnight.

The town and mine are both well preserved with many original buildings, the water filled open cut mine, well-preserved mining buildings and a pump engine house which today houses a museum. Several chimneys from the mining industry have survived and a tourist trail showcases the old Redruth Gaol, miners' dugout cottages in the creek bank, a row of miners' cottages built in 1850, the cellars of the demolished Unicorn Brewery and other historic places. Burra is listed on the Register of the National Estate and many buildings are on the List of State Heritage Items. The town is publicly claimed to be the "Merino capital of the world".

== Timeline ==
Year	Town, people and local area	Mining
1843	Surveyor General E.C. Frome sketches a shepherd's hut on the Burra Burra Creek	
1845	Townsite chosen and first streets laid out in Kooringa	Discovery of copper and commencement of mining operations at the Burra Burra Mine
1846	First cottages built and a police contingent arrives	Mining begins at the Bon Accord Mine
1847	Kooringa Wesleyan Chapel built as the first church	
1848		The miners' strike was the first strike in South Australia and the first industrial strike of significance in Australia
1849	Redruth and Aberdeen land auctions held	Patent Copper Company begins smelting copper ore
1850	First public town meeting to discuss the proposed South Australian constitution	
1851	Burra's reported population of 5,000 made it the 7th largest town in Australia and the largest inland settlement	
1856	Redruth Gaol completed	
1858		The Burra Burra Mine covers 15 acres (6.1 ha) with 8 miles (13 km) of tunnels and galleries.
1859	Telegraph, post office and National Australia Bank open. Floods wipe out most of the miners' dugouts along the creek	Princess Royal Mining Company closes
1867	Act No. 20 passed authorising construction of railway to Burra	Underground mining ceases
1869	Freehold land for sale on Kooringa	Burra Burra Mine workforce reduced to 46
1870	First train and rabbit plague arrive at Burra	Open cut operations begin
1872	Burra District Council formed. Township of New Aberdeen laid out	
1873	Original Unicorn Brewery established	
1876	The first newspaper, Northern Mail, was first printed. Proclamation of the Corporation of the Town of Burra	
1877	Northern Mail renamed Burra News and Northern Mail Inaugural agricultural show. Burra Hospital opened	Burra Burra Mine closes
1878	Burra News and Northern Mail renamed Burra Record (continuing until 1977)	
1883	Present railway station building constructed, replacing a former wooden building	
1890	Discovery of diprotodon skeletons at Baldina Creek	
1897		Unsuccessful attempt to form a company to reopen mining
1899		Burra slag extraction company begins operations on slagheaps
1901	White Sunday – Burra's greatest snowstorm	
1902	Motor vehicles appear for sale in Burra. Unicorn Brewery closed due to new Commonwealth tax laws	
1916		Burra Mine area (262 acres) sold for £6,000
1921		Morphett's Engine House demolished for use as building stone
1922	Prime minister Billy Hughes unveils the Burra and District Fallen Soldiers' memorial	
1925	Burra Electricity Supply Company switches on	
1930		Gold discovered at nearby Mongolata
1932	Sir Charles Kingsford Smith lands in Southern Cross and takes townspeople for joyrides	
1934		183-ounce gold nugget (Pexton's nugget) found at Mongolata
1938	The Council merges into the District Council of Burra Burra	
1951	First housing trust homes built	
1957	Television first displayed in the town hall	
1961		Burra Burra Mine area opened as a tourist resort
1967	Driest year on record with 6.50 inches (165 mm) of rain	
1970	World record price for a Merino Ram of $27,200 from the Collinsville Stud	
1971		Samin Ltd begins production of copper concentrates
1972	Resited Cornish chimney opened by Governor Sir Mark Oliphant	$3 Million plans for expansion announced by Samin Ltd
1974	Wettest year on record with 35.06 inches (891 mm) of rain	
1979	The Burra Charter was adopted by Australia ICOMOS in Burra	
1980	The film Breaker Morant was filmed in the area with Market Square featuring due to its preserved Victorian buildings	
1981		Work ceases at the mine.
1983		Final attempt to reopen the mine
1985	Rail services to Burra cease	
1988	Burra proclaimed Merino capital of the world. Railway line closed (now dismantled north of Burra)	
1993	Burra proclaimed a state heritage area	
1997	District Council amalgamated into the District Council of Goyder	
2000		Princess Royal Mine area sold to CR and SP Pty Ltd
2008	A new Unicorn Brewery (microbrewery) opens for business, headquartered in Burra	

== See also ==
- List of reduplicated Australian place names
