= Samuel Stocks, jun. =

Businessman early in the life of the colony of South Australia

- Born: c. 1812; Stockport, Cheshire, England
- Died: 3 February 1850 (aged 37–38); Adelaide, South Australia
- Occupation: businessman
- Years active: 1842–1850
- Known for: Original board of directors of the Burra Burra Copper Mine
- Father: Samuel Stocks

Samuel Stocks, jun. (c. 1812 – 3 February 1850) was a businessman in the early days of the Colony of South Australia. His father, also named Samuel Stocks, was also a businessman and arrived in South Australia a few months after his son.

Samuel Stocks, jun. was born in Stockport, Cheshire and arrived in Adelaide on the Glenarm on 1 December 1842 and immediately plunged into the business world of the young Colony. It was at a time of economic gloom but he invested heavily in the South Australian Mining Association which was prospecting for copper at Burra, north of Adelaide. Their company (nicknamed "Snobs" – Captain Allen and Messrs. Stocks, Beck, Hallett, Bunce, Penny, Graham, Featherstone, Waterhouse, Sanders, Peacock, Drew, Bouch, Smith, and others) won rights to the northern section "Wheal Grey", which proved to be fabulously rich; the "Princess Royal" section to the south, won by the "Nobs", proved valueless except to the pastoralist. Stocks was appointed to its first board of directors (with J. Hagen, C. Beck, H. Mildred, W. Peacock, E. Solomon, J. B. Neales, W. Paxton, J. Ridley, G. Bean, J. Dickens, J. Newman, G. Stevenson, G. S. Kingston, M. Featherstone and J. B. Graham.), was elected its first chairman then appointed site manager, when the position of chairman fell to Charles Beck.

He laid out on section 1283, Hundred of Light in 1845, naming it Stockport for his birthplace.

He was an active member of the Agricultural and Horticultural Society and was often called upon as chairman of its social functions.

== Obituary ==
The South Australian Register published this notice on the death of Samuel Stocks jun.:

DIED. On Sunday morning last, at half-past six o'clock, at his residence, in Hindley-street, West, Mr Samuel Stocks, jun., aged 37. This gentleman arrived in the colony about seven years ago, commencing his colonial career as a merchant, with the fairest promise of success, and was regarded by his numerous friends as likely to make a valuable member of our community. His disposition and manners were frank, his education sound, his mercantile qualifications of a superior order, and his respect for the forms of godliness was strikingly manifest, long after he had lost its power and ceased to be under that moral restraint which was once habitual to him. One of the original Burra Burra proprietors, the securing that special survey was in no small degree due to Mr Stocks's activity and influence. He amassed considerable wealth through that successful venture, and, withdrawing from his commercial pursuits in Adelaide, assumed the superintendence of this wonderful mine for a considerable period, where his admirable management, in which liberality, good nature, and business tact were blended, caused him to be greatly esteemed in the busy neighbourhood of Kooringa. The large and sudden accumulation of property, however, proved a snare, and the deceased unhappily fell into habits of intemperance, which beclouded the latter portion of his life, and, undermining a fine natural constitution, "brought down his strength in his journey and shortened his days." It is consolatory, however, to know that in his last moments he was able to express contrition, and his sorrowing friends have hope in his death.

A petition was raised by some 150 people calling for the sacking of editor John Stephens. A counter-petition in his support was signed by some 2500. Significantly, Samuel Stocks (senior) supported the editor.

== Recognition ==
His portrait was captured in caricature by S. T. Gill.
