= Burraton =

Coordinates: 50.413044°N 04.231435°W

Burraton: Cornish: Trewerin
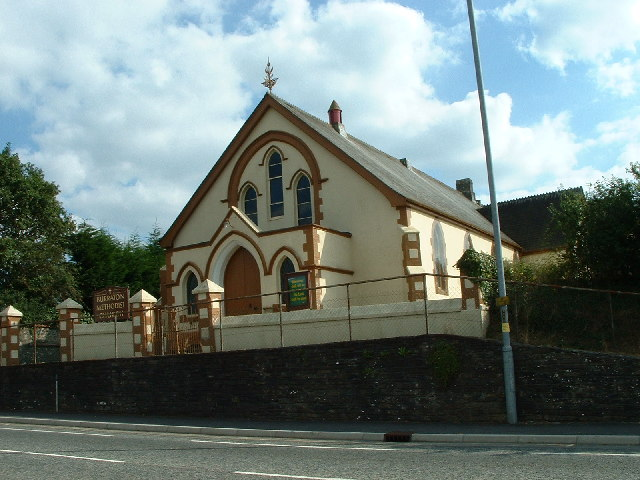
- The former Burraton Methodist Chapel

- Location within Cornwall
- OS grid reference: SX4159
- Shire county: Cornwall
- Region: South West
- Country: England
- Sovereign state: United Kingdom
- Post town: SALTASH
- Postcode district: PL12
- Police: Devon and Cornwall
- Fire: Cornwall
- Ambulance: South Western

Burraton (Cornish: Trewerin) is a northern suburb of Saltash, Cornwall, England, UK.
