= Ayers House (Adelaide) =

House in Adelaide, South Australia

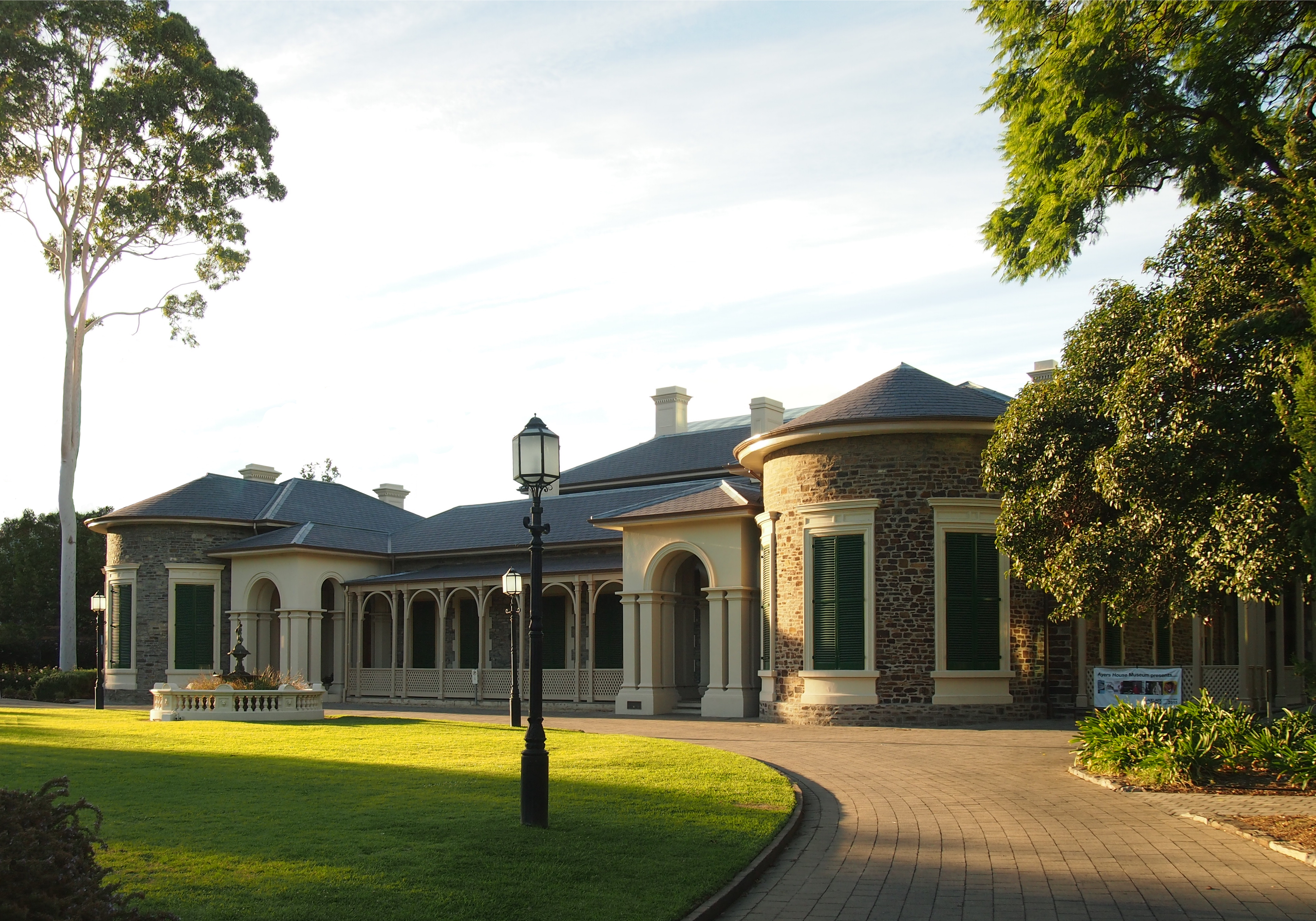
- Interactive map of the Ayers House area

General information
- Architectural style: Regency
- Location: 288 North Terrace, Adelaide, Australia
- Coordinates: 34°55′18″S 138°36′34″E
- Construction started: 1846
- Completed: 1876

Design and construction
- Architect: Sir George Strickland Kingston (attrib.)

South Australian Heritage Register
- Official name: Ayers House and former Coach House/Stables and Wall
- Designated: 24 July 1980
- Reference no.: 10849

Ayers House, formerly named Austral House, is the present-day name for a historic mansion on North Terrace, Adelaide, South Australia. It is named after Sir Henry Ayers, five times Premier of South Australia and wealthy industrialist, who occupied it from 1855 until 1897. It is the only mansion on North Terrace to have survived. The house has been listed on the South Australian Heritage Register since July 1980.

== History ==
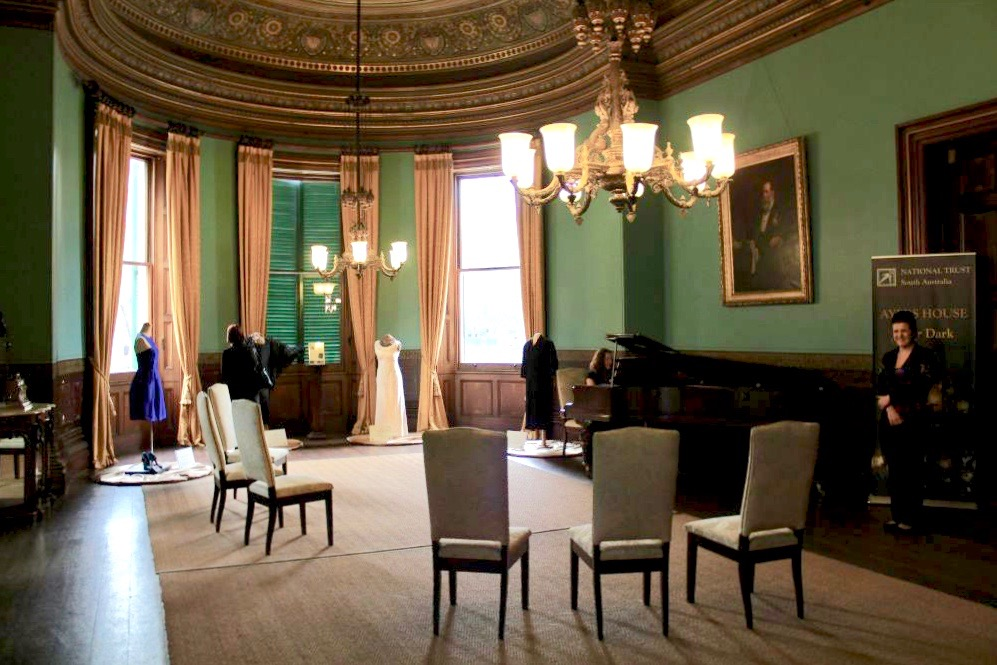
Museum items in the west turret room

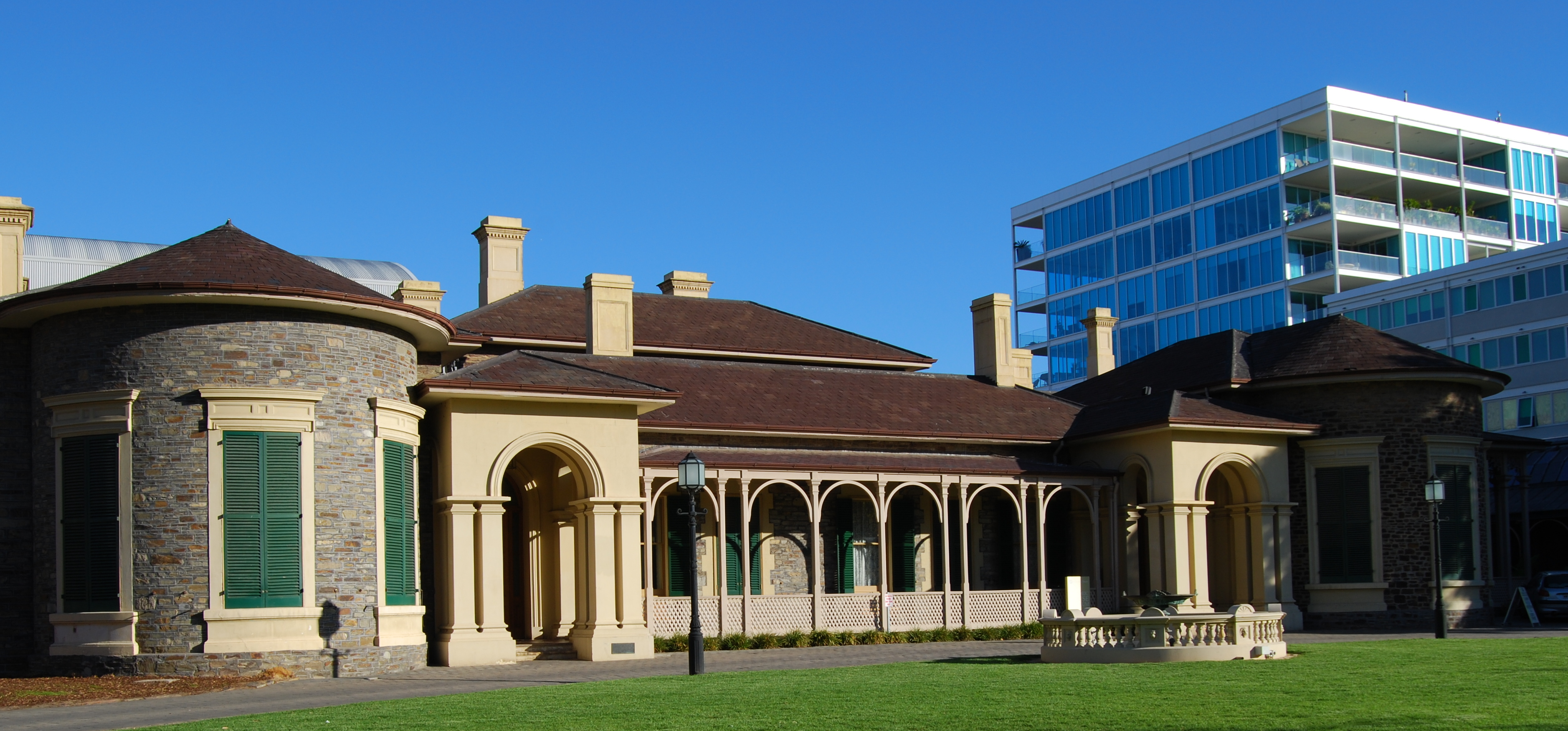
Front of Ayers House from within the property

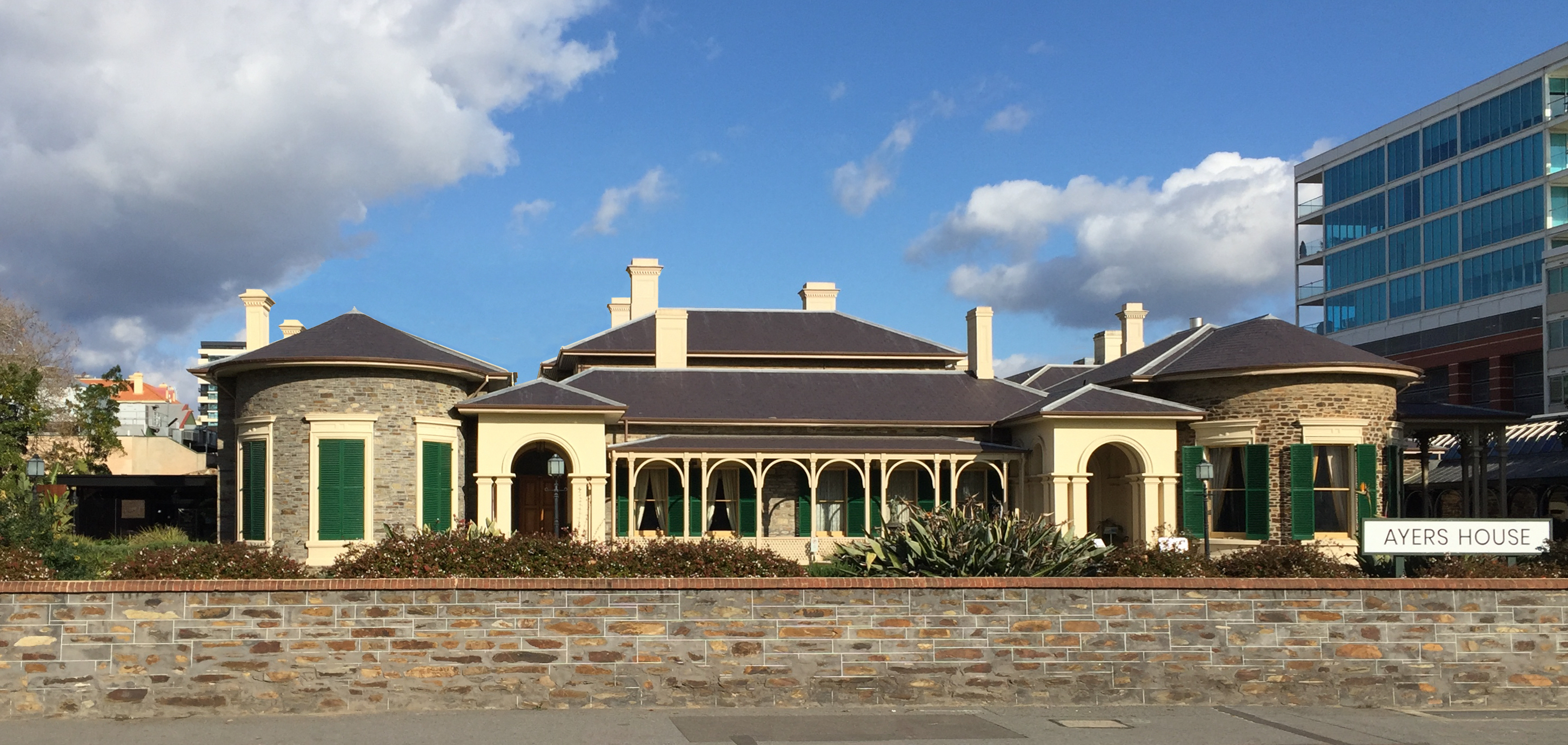
Ayers House from North Terrace, July 2020

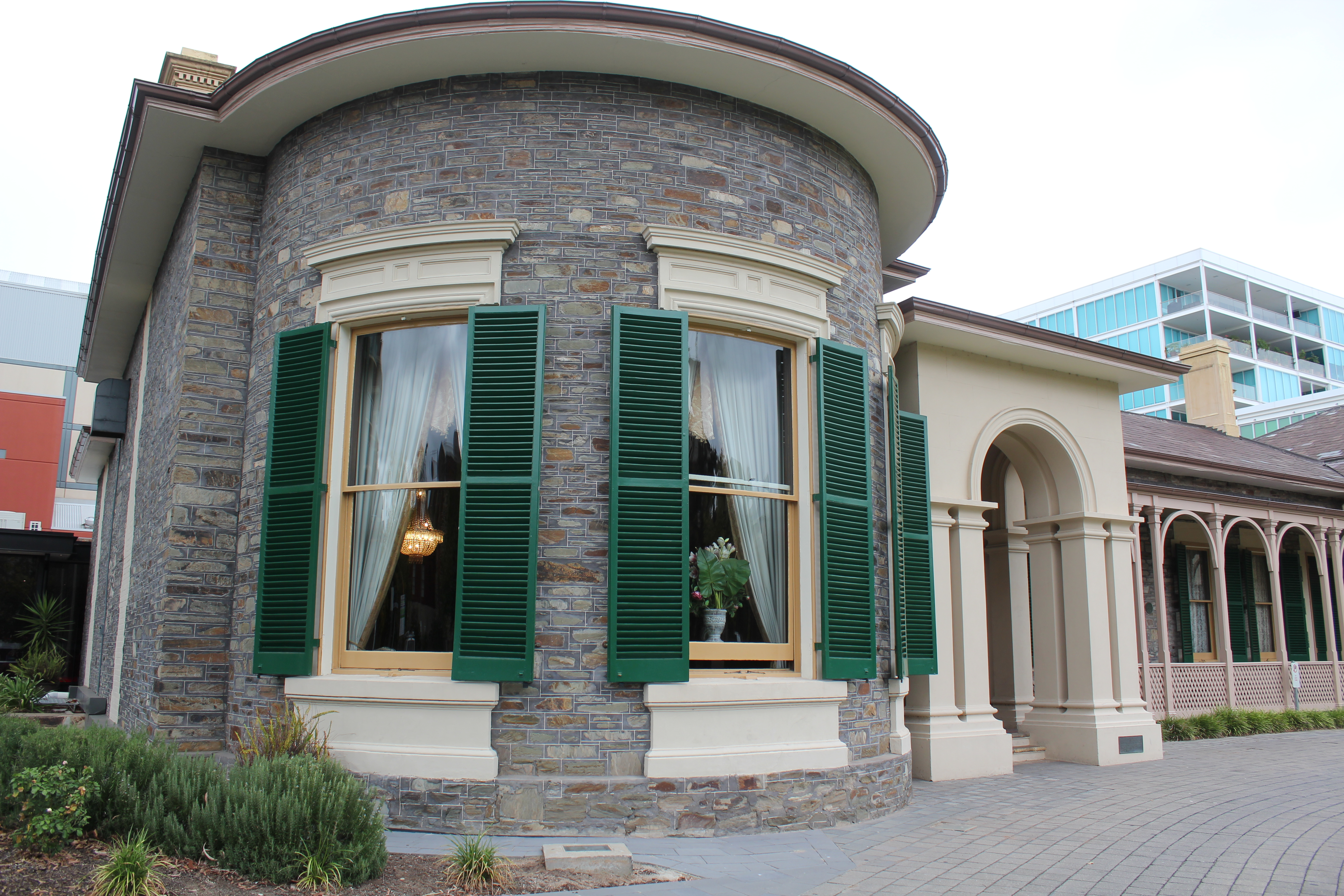
Front of Ayers House – east turret

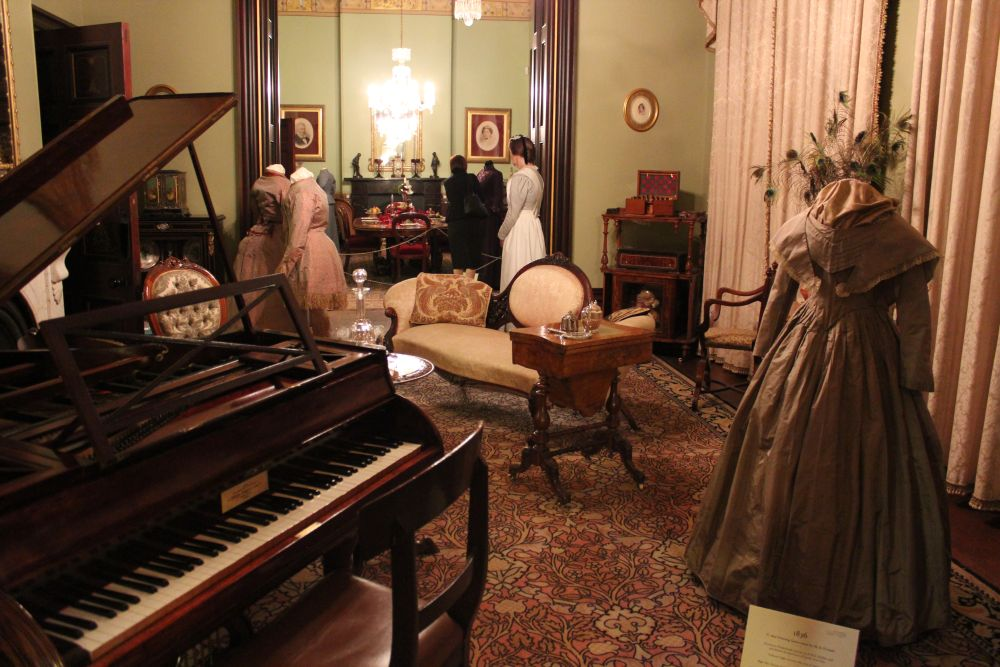
State dining room with grand piano

Plans for the two-storey mansion, which for the greater part of its existence was named Austral House, were developed in 1846 for William Paxton, an Adelaide chemist. It is constructed of local bluestone and is Regency period in style, thought to have been designed by George Strickland Kingston, who interpreted the work of Robert Kerr, a leading architect of the period in Britain.

In 1855, Sir Henry Ayers leased the property when it was a 9-room brick house. He transformed it into a 40-room mansion mainly during the 1860s; it was finally completed in 1876. It is well preserved. Internally, the rooms feature hand-painted ceilings, stencilled woodwork and memorabilia from the Ayers family, demonstrating the wealth of the owners at the time it was built. Ayers also commissioned a basement to escape the hot Adelaide summers. During its owner's parliamentary service, the house was the venue for cabinet meetings, parliamentary dinners and grand balls. It was one of the first properties in Adelaide to be fitted with gas lighting.

The names given to many of the rooms, and their functions, were revealed in notes made by Sir Henry when he recorded the temperatures in various places in the house during Adelaide's very hot weather. The first such record was dated 1874.

== Heritage listing ==
Ayers House was listed on the South Australian Heritage Register in July 1980.

== Restoration ==
Sometime around 2005, a plumbing fault caused flooding, and led to flaking and peeling of the elaborate painted decoration of the ceiling. Restoration work was undertaking by a team of Artlab Australia specialists, who "resecured each individual paint flake by applying a consolidant". This earned Artlab a commendation in the Heritage Trades and Products category of the 2005 Edmund Wright Heritage Award.

== Use ==
In 1897 Ayers died, and in 1909, following an Adelaide Club ball at the house, Henry Newland proposed the club purchase the property. Plans were drawn up then abandoned. Eventually, it was sold in 1914 to Arthur John Walkley and Henry Woodcock's company, Austral Gardens Ltd. They built a dance hall, "The Palais Royal", on its western side and entertainment areas on the east.

Since then, the house has had many uses, including a club for injured soldiers from 1918 to 1922, and an open-air café from 1914 to 1932.

The Government of South Australia bought the property in 1926 for nurse accommodation and training – it was opposite the now-closed Adelaide Hospital. Further dormitories, built in 1946, were removed in 1973. The house was closed as nurses' quarters in 1969, after a new residential wing was built at the back of the hospital.

In the 1960s, the National Trust of South Australia campaigned successfully to save the building from demolition since it was "the last of the grand mansions of Adelaide's North Terrace boulevard". In 1970, Premier Don Dunstan overrode his cabinet colleagues to save the mansion's from being demolished. Mindful of its tourism potential, he instigated its renovation as a tourist and cultural centre that included a museum and fine-dining and bistro restaurants. At this time, much of the house was conserved to original condition. Dunstan engaged the National Trust of South Australia to conduct the museum for restoration and public use.

Costumes, silverware, artworks, furniture, a 300-kilogram (660 lb) chandelier and the original gasoliers were displayed in the museum area. The bedrooms became the "fine dining" Henry Ayers Restaurant; the stables housed a bistro. Four private event rooms were used for weddings and events.

In June 2021, South Australian Environment Minister David Speirs announced that the History Trust of South Australia, a government agency, would move into the building after undergoing an A$6.6 million makeover to be funded by his government. He stated that he had ended the National Trust's monthly recurring lease and that, although the lease termination letter cited only 31 days, the Trust would be given "several months" to vacate the premises. Critics surmised that the decision to terminate the lease "sounds like punishment" following the National Trust's criticism of the government-approved demolition of a historic structure at Port Adelaide in 2019, and that the government's History Trust "is of course never going to publicly criticise them".

The National Trust launched a petition and legal action against the order from Speirs, but was unsuccessful. It then moved to premises in Beaumont. However, the government changed in March 2022. Ten days later, the new Environment Minister, Susan Close, announced that the government was supporting the National Trust to have a permanent home in Ayers House and that once a "comprehensive review" had been completed, the Trust could move back to the property. In April 2024 the government under premier Peter Malinauskas passed the Ayers House Bill 2024, making Ayers House the permanent home of the SA National Trust. The government also earmarked A$5.7 million for upgrading the building.
