= Burra Creek (South Australia) =

River in South Australia

Coordinates: 34°01′17″S 139°41′49″E

Burra Creek is a stream in South Australia rising in the northern Mount Lofty Ranges, flowing generally southwards and eastwards to join the River Murray at Morgan.

== Course and features ==
The stream rises near Hallett in the northern Mount Lofty Ranges and flows generally southwards through the township of Burra to the Burra Gorge near Worlds End at which point the course changes to flow generally eastwards. The course then passes through very sparsely populated pastoral lands including the Burra Creek Plain (in the vicinity of the historic locality of Maude) before meeting the River Murray about 3 kilometres (1.9 mi) upstream from the Morgan ferry crossing.

== See also ==
- List of rivers of Australia § South Australia
- Hundred of Kooringa
