= William Allen (philanthropist) =

- Born: c. 1790; England
- Died: 17 October 1856; Adelaide, South Australia
- Occupations: Sailor, merchant, pastoralist, mining magnate
- Known for: Founding St. Peter's College

William Allen (c. 1790 – 17 October 1856), commonly referred to as Captain Allen, was the joint founder of St Peter's College, Adelaide, South Australia.

William Allen was born in England. He entered the navy of the British East India Company at age 15 and served on the Sullimany.

took the ship to Singapore where the mutineers were tried and the leaders executed.

Allen returned to England in 1837, having inherited his parents' property on their death. He found it hard to settle down however, and sailed to Adelaide aboard the Buckinghamshire in March 1839. He bought 809 ha (2000 acres) of land in the neighbourhood of Port Gawler with his friend Captain John Ellis.

HeBishop Augustus Short became "the greatest temporal benefactor - next after the Baroness Burdett-Coutts - whom the diocese has yet been permitted to know".

Allen visited England again in 1853, upon his return to South Australia he retired from his pastoral activities. An early recipient after his death was St Paul's building fund.

He died at Adelaide on 17 October 1856.

== See also ==
- Mennell, Philip (1892). "Allen, Captain William" . The Dictionary of Australasian Biography. London: Hutchinson & Co – via Wikisource.
