= Henry Ayers =

Australian politician

The Honourable Sir Henry Ayers GCMG
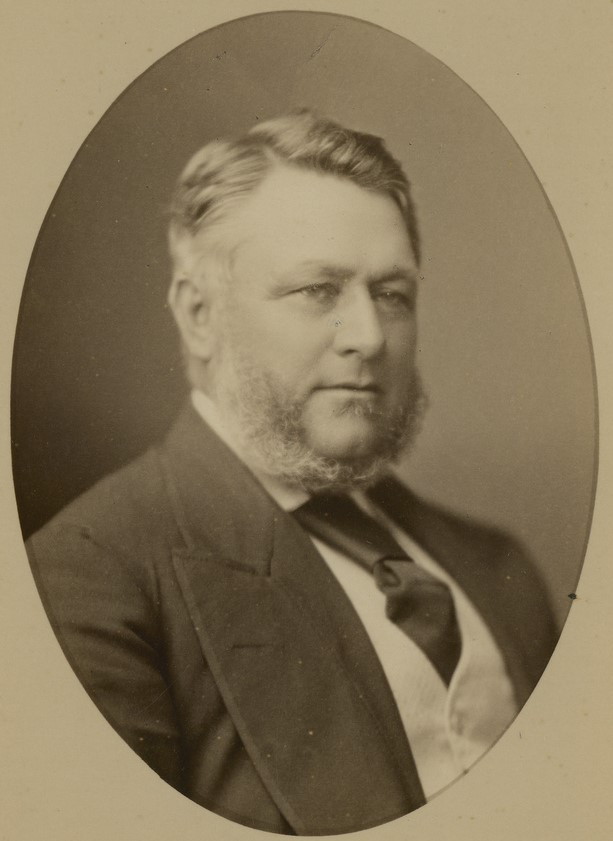

8th Premier of South Australia
- In office 15 July 1863 – 4 August 1864
- Monarch: Victoria
- Governor: Sir Dominick Daly
- Preceded by: Francis Dutton
- Succeeded by: Sir Arthur Blyth
- In office 20 September 1865 – 23 October 1865
- Monarch: Victoria
- Governor: Sir Dominick Daly
- Preceded by: Francis Dutton
- Succeeded by: Captain John Hart
- In office 3 May 1867 – 24 September 1868
- Monarch: Victoria
- Governor: Sir Dominick Daly
- Preceded by: Sir James Boucaut
- Succeeded by: Captain John Hart
- In office 13 October 1868 – 3 November 1868
- Monarch: Victoria
- Governor: Sir James Fergusson
- Preceded by: Captain John Hart
- Succeeded by: Henry Strangways
- In office 22 January 1872 – 22 July 1873
- Monarch: Victoria
- Governor: Sir James Fergusson; Sir Anthony Musgrave
- Preceded by: Sir Arthur Blyth
- Succeeded by: Sir Arthur Blyth

Personal details
- Born: 1 May 1821 Portsea, Portsmouth, Hampshire, England, UK
- Died: 11 June 1897 (aged 76) Adelaide, South Australia

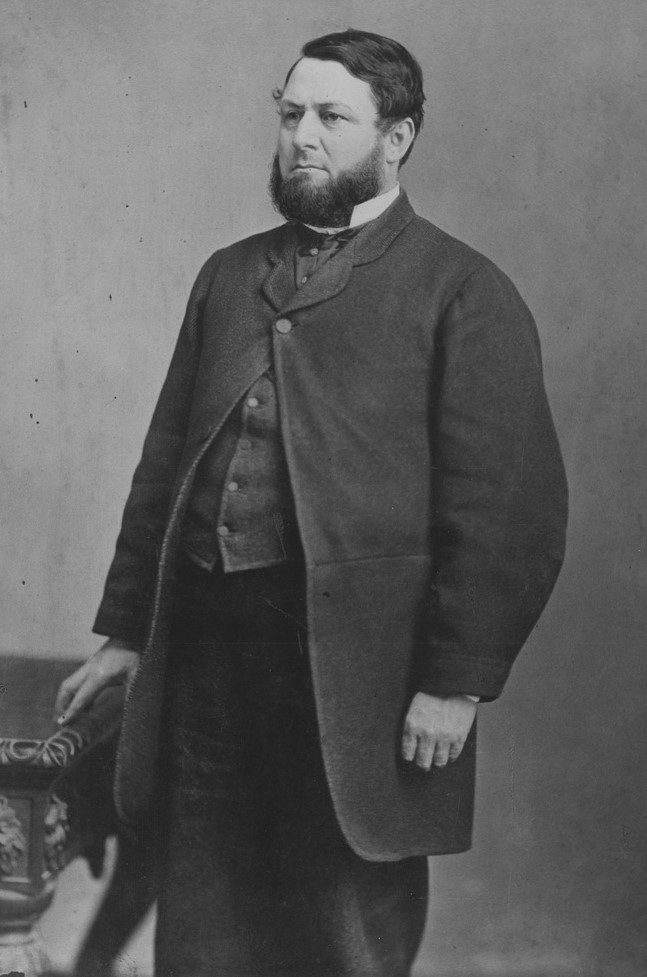

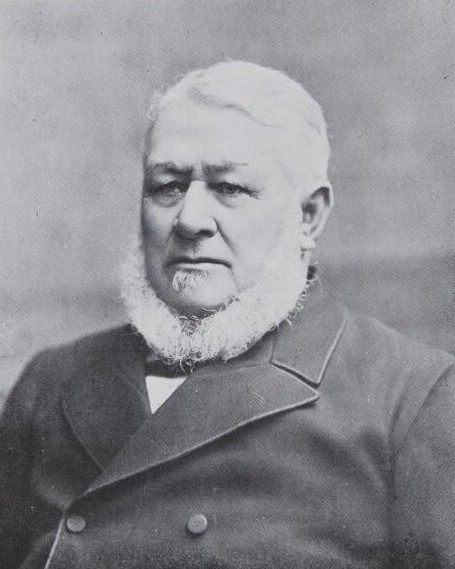

Sir Henry Ayers GCMG (now pronounced AIRS; 1 May 1821 – 11 June 1897) was the eighth Premier of South Australia, serving a record five times between 1863 and 1873.

His lasting memorial was in the name Ayers Rock, now better-known as Uluru, which was named in 1873 by the explorer William Gosse.

== Overview ==
Ayers was born on 1 May 1821 at Portsea, Portsmouth, Hampshire, England, the son of William Ayers, of the Portsmouth dockyard, and Elizabeth, née Breakes. After education at the Beneficial Society's School (Portsea) he entered a law office in 1832. Less than a month after his marriage in 1840, he emigrated with his wife, Anne (née Potts), to South Australia, as a carpenter, with free passages; he arrived in Adelaide, Australia later the same year.

Until 1845, he worked as a law clerk, and was then appointed secretary of the South Australian Mining Association, which owned the copper mine at Burra Burra. Henry Roach was chief Captain, responsible for day-to-day operations, from 1847 to 1867. Within a year the mine employed over 1000 men. For nearly 50 years, Ayers was in control of the operation, known as the "Monster Mine", initially as the secretary and later as the managing director. He made his wealth from the mine, which also secured the wealth of the colony of South Australia.

== Politics ==
On 9 March 1857, Ayers was elected to the first South Australian Legislative Council under responsible government, the youngest member elected.

In March 1863 Ayers was selected as one of the three South Australian representatives at the inter-colonial conference on uniform tariffs and inland customs duties. He also represented the colony at several other conferences from 1864 to 1877. On 4 July 1863 Ayers became minister without portfolio in the first Dutton cabinet. This ministry resigned just 11 days later however, as council demanded that it should have an executive minister to represent the government and Dutton refused. Ayers formed his first ministry as Premier and Chief Secretary on 15 July 1863.

In 1881, Ayers was elected President of the South Australian Legislative Council.

He was appointed a Companion of the Order of St Michael and St George (CMG) in 1870, knighted as a Knight Commander of the same order (KCMG) in 1872, and raised to Knight Grand Cross of the Order of St Michael and St George (GCMG) in the 1894 Birthday Honours.

He died in Adelaide on 11 June 1897. His wife had died in 1881, and he was survived by three sons and a daughter.

== Legacy ==
He was the first chairman of the South Australian Gas Company.

He was the author of Pioneer Difficulties on Founding South Australia.

Ayers resided in Ayers House from 1855 until 1897 and, in the 1860s, expanded it from a nine-room house into a grand mansion. His youngest child, Lucy, was born there. During Sir Henry's parliamentary service, Ayers House was used for cabinet meetings, parliamentary dinners, and grand balls.

== Family ==
Henry Ayers married Anne Potts (1812 – 13 August 1881) at Alverstokein around 1839. Anne was a sister of winemaker Frank Potts. They had four surviving sons and two daughters:

- Frank Richman Ayers (1842 – 23 April 1906)
- Henry "Harry" Lockett Ayers (1844–1905), married Ada Fisher Morphett (5 May 1843 – 1939) on 1 October 1866. She is remembered for contributing the "Tiffany windows" to St Paul's Church, Pulteney Street.
- Frederick "Fred" Ayers (1847 – 1 February 1897) married Evelyn Cameron Page on 8 November 1870. He was a prominent member of the South Australian Jockey Club.
- Margaret Elizabeth Ayers (1848 – 19 September 1887) married Arthur Robert Lungley on 29 April 1875
- (Arthur) Ernest Ayers (1852 – 2 April 1921) married Barbara Agnes Milne on 30 April 1878. Barbara was a daughter of William Milne MP.
- Lucy Josephine Ayers (1856 – 11 May 1945) married John Bagot on 24 September 1878. John was a grandson of Charles Hervey Bagot.

Ayers' remains were buried at the West Terrace Cemetery (Road 3, Path 19).

Parliament of South Australia
Preceded by John Bagot; Arthur Blyth; Francis Dutton	Member of the South Australian Legislative Council; 1857–1893; Served alongside: Multiple Members	Succeeded by Martin Basedow; James Martin; William Russell
South Australian Legislative Council
Preceded by William Milne	President of the South Australian Legislative Council; 1881–1893	Succeeded by Richard Baker
Political offices
Preceded by Francis Dutton	Premier of South Australia; 1863–1864	Succeeded by Arthur Blyth
Preceded by John Hart	Chief Secretary of South Australia; 1863–1865	Succeeded by John Hart
Preceded by Francis Dutton	Premier of South Australia; 1865	Succeeded by John Hart
Preceded by James Boucaut	Premier of South Australia; 1867–1868	Succeeded by John Hart
Preceded by Arthur Blyth	Chief Secretary of South Australia; 1867–1868	Succeeded by John Hart
Preceded by John Hart	Premier of South Australia; 1868	Succeeded by Henry Strangways
Preceded by John Hart	Chief Secretary of South Australia; 1868	Succeeded by John Bagot
Preceded by Arthur Blyth	Premier of South Australia; 1872–1873	Succeeded by Arthur Blyth
Preceded by William Milne	Chief Secretary of South Australia; 1872–1873	Succeeded by Arthur Blyth
Preceded by George Hawker	Chief Secretary of South Australia; 1876–1877	Succeeded by William Morgan
