= List of museums in South Australia =

This list of museums in South Australia contains museums which are defined for this context as institutions (including nonprofit organizations, government entities, and private businesses) that collect and care for objects of cultural, artistic, scientific, or historical interest and make their collections or related exhibits available for public viewing. Also included are non-profit art galleries and university art galleries.

Name	Location	Region	Type	Summary
Adelaide Gaol	Thebarton	Adelaide suburbs	Prison	Preserved historic prison and function centre
Adelaide Lithuanian Museum	Norwood	Adelaide suburbs	Ethnic	website, Lithuanian life and culture
Adelaide Masonic Centre Museum	Adelaide	Adelaide	Masonic	website
Andamooka Dukes Bottlehouse Museum	Andamooka	Eyre Peninsula	Mining	information, opal mining, located in a building built from discarded beer bottles
Architecture Museum	Adelaide	Adelaide	Architecture	website, part of the University of South Australia, collection of documents related to the history and practice of architecture in South Australia
Ardrossan Historical Museum	Ardrossan	Yorke Peninsula	Local history	website, operated by the National Trust of South Australia, located in the Clarence Herbert Smith Implement Factory where the stump-jump plough and other farm machinery were manufactured
Army Museum of South Australia	Keswick	Adelaide suburbs	Military	website, located in Keswick Barracks,
Art Gallery of South Australia	Adelaide	Adelaide	Visual arts	Largest state art collection in Australia
Arts Centre, Port Noarlunga	Port Noarlunga	Adelaide suburbs	Art	website
Austbuilt Maritime Museum	Peterhead	Adelaide suburbs	Maritime	website, operated by the Port Adelaide Historical Society
Australian Museum of Childhood	Port Adelaide	Adelaide suburbs	Toy	information, Australian manufactured toys dating back to the 1890s
Axel Stenross Maritime Museum	Port Lincoln	Eyre Peninsula	Maritime	website, boats and boat building, area maritime heritage
Ayers House (Adelaide)	Adelaide	Adelaide	Historic house	Operated by the National Trust of South Australia, 19th mansion with costumes, silverware, artworks and furniture
Balaklava Museum	Balaklava	Mid North	Local history	website
Barbed Wire Pub and Museum	Spalding	Mid North	Commodity	website, features over 500 examples of barbed wire
Barossa Museum	Tanunda	Barossa Valley	Local history	website, area German heritage
Barossa Regional Gallery	Tanunda	Barossa Valley	Art	website
Bay Discovery Centre	Glenelg	Adelaide suburbs	Multiple	website, cultural heritage of South Australia, history, art
Beachport Old Wool and Grain Store Museum	Beachport	Limestone Coast	Local history	website, information, operated by the National Trust of South Australia
Bon Accord Mining Museum	Burra	Mid North	Mining	website, operated by the National Trust of South Australia
Booleroo Steam & Traction Preservation Society Museum	Booleroo Centre	Flinders Ranges	Technology	website, steam tractors and agriculture equipment
Bourne's Bird Museum	Naracoorte	Limestone Coast	Natural history	information, mounted birds, nests and mammals, bird's eggs
Brinkworth Historical Reserve Museum	Brinkworth	Mid North	Local history	information
Bublacowie Military Museum	Between Minlaton and Yorketown	Yorke Peninsula	Military	information
Burra Regional Art Gallery	Burra	Mid North	Art	website
Cape Jaffa Lighthouse	Kingston SE	Limestone Coast	Maritime	Operated by the National Trust of South Australia, furnished lighthouse with tower to climb
Captain's Cottage Museum	Murray Bridge		Historic house	information
Carrick Hill	Springfield	Adelaide suburbs	Historic house	Mid 20th century mansion with collection of drawings, sculptures, antiques and paintings
The Cedars (Australia)	Hahndorf	Adelaide Hills	Historic house	website, house and studio of landscape artist Hans Heysen
Ceduna School House Museum	Ceduna	Eyre Peninsula	Education	website, operated by the National Trust of Australia
Charles Sturt Museum	Grange	Adelaide suburbs	Historic house	website, home of explorer Charles Sturt
Chas Roe Electronics Museum	Wallaroo	Yorke Peninsula	Technology	website, electrical appliances and devices including the telegraph, telephone, radio, television, sound and video recorders, home appliances, medical equipment, computers, TV games and more
Clare Police Station and Courthouse	Jamestown	Mid North	Local history	website, operated by the National Trust of South Australia
Classic Jets Fighter Museum	Parafield	Adelaide suburbs	Aerospace	
Clayton Farm Heritage Museum	Bordertown	Limestone Coast	Farm	Late 19th century farmstead with historical thatched buildings and sheds, restored historical farm machinery and stationary engines
Cobdogla Irrigation Museum	Cobdogla	Riverland	Technology	website, operated by the National Trust of South Australia, steam pump, locomotive, traction engine, tractors, machinery and irrigation equipment
Contemporary Art Centre of South Australia	Adelaide	Adelaide	Arts	Contemporary art
Crystal Brook Heritage Centre	Crystal Brook	Mid North	Local history	information
Dingley Dell	Port MacDonnell	Limestone Coast	Historic house	website, home of poet Adam Lindsay Gordon
Edithburgh Museum	Edithburgh	Yorke Peninsula	Local history	information
Embroiderers' Guild of South Australia Museum	Mile End	Adelaide suburbs	Textile	website, embroidered, beaded, patchwork and lace pieces – the collection started in 1965 became known officially as the Embroiderers' Guild Museum in 1988.
Encounter Coast Discovery Centre	Victor Harbor	Fleurieu Peninsula	Local history	website, information, operated by the National Trust of South Australia, located in a former Customs house and station master's residence
Enfield Heritage Museum	Regency Park	Adelaide suburbs	Open air	information, town and country life in South Australia from the 1880s to more recent times
Eudunda Family Heritage Gallery	Eudunda		Local history	website
Excell Blacksmith and Engineering Workshop Museum	Tumby Bay	Eyre Peninsula	History	information
Farm Shed Museum	Kadina	Yorke Peninsula	Agriculture	website, farm machinery, role of women on farms, operated by the National Trust of South Australia
Fayes Underground Home	Coober Pedy	Far North	Historic house	information, furnished dugout home
Flinders University Museum of Art	Adelaide	Adelaide	Art	website, part of Flinders University
Fort Glanville Conservation Park	Semaphore South	Adelaide suburbs	Military	19th century fort
Fred Teague's Museum	Hawker	Flinders Ranges	History	website, information, includes gemstones, minerals, fossils, photographs, antique bottles and memorabilia
Friedensberg Historic German School Museum	Springton	Barossa Valley	Education	information
Gamble Cottage	Blackwood	Adelaide suburbs	Historic house	website, operated by the National Trust of South Australia
Gawler Old Telegraph Station Museum	Gawler	Adelaide suburbs	Local history	website, operated by the National Trust of South Australia
Glencoe Woolshed	Glencoe	Limestone Coast	Farming	website, 19th century blade shearing and wool handling shed, operated by the National Trust of South Australia
Goolwa Motor Museum	Goolwa	Fleurieu Peninsula	Automotive	information
Goolwa Museum	Goolwa	Fleurieu Peninsula	Local history	website, operated by the National Trust of South Australia
Greenock Aviation Museum	Greenock	Barossa Valley	Aerospace	information, preserved and replica aircraft, restoration projects, scale models and aviation memorabilia
Hahndorf Academy	Hahndorf	Adelaide Hills	Multiple	website, regional art gallery, local history, German migration, drawings of Hans Heysen
Hindmarsh Fire & Folk Museum	Hindmarsh	Adelaide suburbs	Firefighting	website, equipment, clothing and vehicles, operated by the Hindmarsh Historical Society
Holdfast Bay History Centre	Brighton	Adelaide suburbs	Local history	website
Hope Cottage Museum	Kingscote	Kangaroo Island	Historic house	website, website, mid 19th century period cottage with period rooms, local history displays, operated by the National Trust of South Australia
Jamestown Railway Station and Goods Shed Museum	Jamestown	Mid North	Local history	website, operated by the National Trust of South Australia
Jill and Vic Fauser's Private Museum	Port Neill	Eyre Peninsula	History	information, includes stationary engines, a blacksmith shop, shells, rocks and bottles, historic household items
Kapunda Community Gallery	Kapunda	Mid North	Art	website
Kapunda Museum	Kapunda	Mid North	Local history	information
Kerry Packer Civic Gallery	Adelaide	Adelaide	Art	website, part of the University of South Australia
Kimba Historical Museum	Kimba	Eyre Peninsula	Open air	information
Kingston Historic House	Kingston Park	Adelaide suburbs	Historic house	website, mid 19th century home of George Strickland Kingston
Kingston National Trust Museum	Kingston SE	Limestone Coast	Local history	website, operated by the National Trust of South Australia
Koppio Smithy Museum	Koppio	Eyre Peninsula	Local history	website, information, operated by the National Trust of South Australia
Lobethal Archives and Historical Museum	Lobethal	Adelaide Hills	Local history	information, German and English pioneer heritage
Lochend	Cambelltown	Adelaide suburbs	Historic house	information, mid 19th century home of the town's founder
Louise Flierl Mission Museum	Hahndorf	Adelaide Hills	Religious	information, history of the Lutheran Church of Australia in Papua New Guinea and more recently in South East Asia since 1886
Loxton Historical Village	Loxton	Riverland	Open air	website, includes a baker, bank, blacksmith, garage, printer, farm complex, railway, institute, school, operational fruit block and more
Lucindale Agricultural and Folk Museum	Lucindale	Limestone Coast	Local history	information, operated by the Lucindale Historical Society
Mallala Museum	Mallala		Local history	website
Mallee Tourist and Heritage Centre	Pinnaroo	Murray Mallee	Local plus specialities	information Murray Mallee dryland farming, plus D. A. Wurfel grain collection; extensive range restored farm machinery including replica Ridley stripper; letterpress printing
Malowen Lowarth Cottage	Burra	Mid North	Historic house	website, operated by the National Trust of South Australia, mid 19th century period stone cottage
Mannum Dock Museum Of River History	Mannum		Local history	information, includes a paddle steamer, dry dock, local history exhibits, fossils, Aboriginal people
Market Square Museum	Burra	Mid North	History	information, late 19th century period general store and shopkeeper's residence
Martindale Hall	Mintaro	Mid North	Historic house	Owned by the University of Adelaide, leased as heritage museum and boutique hotel
Mary MacKillop Interpretive Centre	Penola	Limestone Coast	Biographical	Based on the life and achievements of Mary MacKillop and Father Julian Tenison Woods
Mary MacKillop Museum Adelaide	Kensington	Adelaide suburb	Social history	Life and work of Mary MacKillop, Julian Tenison Woods and the Sisters of St Joseph, past and present
Melrose Courthouse Heritage Centre	Melrose	Flinders Ranges	Local history	website
Meningie Cheese Factory Museum	Meningie		Local history	website,
Migration Museum, Adelaide	Adelaide	Adelaide	Cultural	Immigration and settlement history of South Australia
Milang Historic Railway Museum	Milang	Fleurieu	Railway	South Australian Railway and Light Railway displays, many interactive, information
Mill Cottage Museum	Port Lincoln	Eyre Peninsula	Historic house	information
Millicent Living History Museum	Millicent	Limestone Coast	Local history	information
Millicent Museum	Millicent	Limestone Coast	Local history	website, operated by the National Trust of South Australia, features restored buggies, carriages and wagons, a machinery shed
Minlaton Museum	Minlaton	Yorke Peninsula	Local history	website, operated by the National Trust of South Australia
MOD. Museum	Adelaide	Adelaide	Future	website, situated in the University_of_South_Australia CRI building on North Terrace
Moonta Mining Museum	Moonta	Yorke Peninsula	Mining	website, operated by the National Trust of South Australia, life of the copper miners
Moonta Wheal Hughes Copper Mine	Moonta	Yorke Peninsula	Mining	website, operated by the National Trust of South Australia, tour of the former copper mine
Morgan Museum	Morgan	Riverland	Local history	website, located in 3 sites, includes farming, riverboat trade, pumping station for the Morgan to Whyalla pipeline, horse-drawn vehicles
Morphetts Enginehouse Museum	Burra	Mid North	Technology	information, restored mining engine house
Mount Dutton Bay Woolshed	Wangary	Eyre Peninsula	Local history	website, shearing, farming and fishing tools and artifacts
Mount Gambier Courthouse Museum	Mount Gambier	Limestone Coast	Law enforcement	website, operated by the National Trust of South Australia
Mount Laura Homestead Museum	Whyalla	Eyre Peninsula	Multiple	website, information, includes early 20th century homestead, workman's cottage, shed with stationary engines, telecommunications museum, operated by the National Trust of South Australia
Murray Bridge Regional Gallery	Murray Bridge		Art	website
Museum of Classical Archaeology, Adelaide	Adelaide	Adelaide	Archaeology	Archaeology of Etruria, ancient Greece and ancient Rome, part of the University of Adelaide
Nangwarry Forestry & Logging Museum	Nangwarry	Limestone Coast	Forestry	website
Naracoorte Art Gallery	Naracoorte	Limestone Coast	Art	website, traditional and contemporary visual arts including etchings by John C. Goodchild, aboriginal prints, paintings and ceramics, furniture and social history items
Naracoorte Caves National Park	Naracoorte	Limestone Coast	Natural history	Fossils found in the caves on display in the Wonambi Fossil Centre
National Military Vehicle Museum	Salisbury	Adelaide suburbs	Military	Trucks, tanks, uniforms, artillery
National Motor Museum, Birdwood	Birdwood	Adelaide Hills	Transportation	Automobiles, motorcycles, model cars
National Railway Museum, Port Adelaide	Port Adelaide	Adelaide suburbs	Railway	Locomotives, rolling stock, historic buildings and equipment
National Trust Agricultural and Folk Museum	Cleve	Eyre Peninsula	Agriculture	website, operated by the National Trust of South Australia in the Cleve Old Council Chambers, open by appointment
Old Government House, South Australia	Belair National Park	Adelaide Hills	Historic house	Former summer residence of the Governors of South Australia
Old Timers Mine and Museum	Coober Pedy	Far North	Mining	website, opal mining
Olivewood	Renmark	Riverland	Historic house	website, operated by the National Trust of South Australia, 1880s period house with a working orangery and olive trees
Onkaparinga Woollen Mill Museum	Lobethal	Adelaide Hills	Textile	website
Parndana Soldier Settlement Museum	Parndana	Kangaroo Island	Local history	information, history of the soldier settlement scheme on the island after World War II
Penneshaw Maritime and Folk Museum	Penneshaw	Kangaroo Island	Local history	website, operated by the National Trust of South Australia
Peterborough Motorcycle and Antique Museum	Peterborough	Mid North	Transportation	website, rare and interesting motorcycles and artefacts
Polish Hill River Church Museum	Sevenhill	Mid North	Ethnic	website, contribution of Polish migrants to the development of the State
Port Elliot National Trust Historic Railway and Seaport Centre	Port Elliot	Fleurieu Peninsula	Railway	website, operated by the National Trust of South Australia
Port Lincoln Railway Museum	Port Lincoln	Eyre Peninsula	Railway	website
Port MacDonnell and District Museum	Port MacDonnell	Limestone Coast	Local history	website
Port Milang Museum	Milang		Local history	information
Port Pirie Historic and Folk Museum	Port Pirie	Mid North	Mining	website, operated by the National Trust of South Australia
Port Pirie Regional Art Gallery	Port Pirie	Mid North	Art	website
Port Pirie RSL & Military Museum	Port Pirie	Mid North	Military	website
Port Victoria Maritime Museum	Minlaton	Yorke Peninsula	Maritime	Sailing ships, sailing crews, shipwrecks
Prospect Hill Historical Museum	Meadows	Adelaide Hills	Local history	information
Radium Hill Museum	Olary		Local history	information, history of Radium Hill uranium mine
Ray Robinson Memorial Military Museum	Kadina	Yorke Peninsula	Military	information
Redruth Gaol	Burra	Mid North	Prison	website, operated by the National Trust of South Australia, mid 19th century prison
Riddoch Art Gallery	Mount Gambier	Limestone Coast	Art	website
River Dolls of Goolwa	Goolwa	Fleurieu Peninsula	Toy	website, dolls, bears and toys from 20th century
R.M. Williams Outback Heritage Museum	Prospect	Adelaide suburbs	Biographical	website, life of R. M. Williams and products of his company
Robe Customs House	Robe	Limestone Coast	Local history	website, operated by the National Trust of South Australia
Roseworthy Agricultural Museum	Roseworthy	Adelaide suburbs	Agriculture	website, history and the development of agricultural machinery, much of which was invented in South Australia
The Round House	Murray Bridge	Murraylands	Local history	Homestead museum documenting the early development of the town of Murray Bridge.
Ruston's Classic Car Museum	Renmark	Riverland	Automotive	website, vintage and historic racing cars
Samstag Museum of Art	Adelaide	Adelaide	Art	Part of the University of South Australia, contemporary art
Sansouci Puppet Museum and Gallery	Wilmington	Flinders Ranges	Puppetry	information, puppets, marionettes and ventriloquist dolls
Santos Museum of Economic Botany	Adelaide	Adelaide	Natural history	website, part of Adelaide Botanic Garden, botanical specimens and art
Sheep's Back Museum	Naracoorte	Limestone Coast	Farming	website, sheep raising and the wool industry, operated by the National Trust of South Australia
South Australian Aviation Museum	Port Adelaide	Adelaide suburbs	Aerospace	Displays aircraft and aircraft engines of relevance to South Australia
South Australian Maritime Museum	Port Adelaide	Adelaide suburbs	Maritime	Immigration to South Australia, maritime history, fleet of historic ships
South Australian Whale Centre	Victor Harbor	Fleurieu Peninsula	Natural history	website, whales and regional marine life
South Australian Museum	Adelaide	Adelaide	Natural history	Natural history museum and research institution
South Australia Police Historical Society	Thebarton	Adelaide suburbs	Law enforcement	History of South Australia Police and of law enforcement in South Australia
South Coast Regional Arts Centre	Goolwa	Fleurieu Peninsula	Art	website
Stangate House and Garden	Aldgate	Adelaide Hills	Historic house	Operated by the National Trust of South Australia, 1940s house with camellia gardens
Stansbury Museum	Stansbury	Yorke Peninsula	Local history	website, 1910 period rooms, collections of clothing, gemstones, bottles, shells and dolls, farming, industry
SteamRanger	Adelaide Hills	Adelaide Hills	Railway	Heritage railway using broad gauge steam locomotives
Steamtown Heritage Rail Centre	Peterborough	Mid North	Railway	
Strathalbyn and District Heritage Centre	Strathalbyn	Fleurieu Peninsula	Local history	website, 19th century police station and courthouse with Victorian period rooms
Streaky Bay Museum	Streaky Bay	Eyre Peninsula	Local history	website, operated by the National Trust of South Australia
St John Ambulance Historical Society of South Australia	Unley	Adelaide suburbs	Medical	information
Swan Reach Museum	Swan Reach		Local history	information
Tailem Rail Museum	Tailem Bend		Railway	information
Tea Tree Gully Heritage Museum	Tea Tree Gully	Adelaide suburbs	Local history	website, operated by the National Trust of South Australia, a member of National Trust of South Australia, lifestyles of residents in the Tea Tree Gully area from the 1850s to 1950s, (name change in 2015 from Old Highercombe Hotel Museum), Accredited museum in History Trust of SA's Museums and Collections (MaC) program.
Tate Museum	Adelaide	Adelaide	Geology and palaeontology	Extensive university collection of geological and palaeontological samples collected since 1880. Named after Ralph Tate, including the Douglas Mawson Antarctic Collection.
Tandanya National Aboriginal Cultural Institute	Adelaide	Adelaide	Arts	Specialises in Indigenous Australian art including visual art, music and storytelling
Terowie Pioneer Gallery and Museums	Terowie	Mid North	Local history	information
Tramway Museum, St Kilda	St Kilda	Adelaide suburbs	Railway	Large collection of trams, some of which are used to carry visitors to the St Kilda Adventure Playground.
Tumby Bay Branch Museum	Tumby Bay	Eyre Peninsula	Local history	website, operated by the National Trust of South Australia
Ukrainian Museum (Australia)	Hindmarsh	Adelaide suburbs	Ethnic	information, Ukrainian history and artisan traditions
Uleybury School Museum	One Tree Hill	Adelaide suburbs	Education	information
Umoona Opal Mine and Museum	Coober Pedy	Far North	Mining	website, opal mining, fossils, aboriginal heritage, dugout homes
Unley Museum	Unley	Adelaide suburbs	Local history	website
Urlwin Park Agricultural Museum	Balaklava	Mid North	Agriculture	information, farm tractors, equipment, tools, vehicles, buildings
Urrbrae House	Urrbrae	Adelaide suburbs	Historic house	Operated by the University of Adelaide, late 19th century mansion
Wallaroo Heritage and Nautical Museum	Wallaroo	Yorke Peninsula	Local history	website, operated by the National Trust of South Australia
Willunga Courthouse Museum	Willunga	Adelaide suburbs	Law enforcement	website, operated by the National Trust of South Australia, courthouse complex including cells, stable and police residence
Willunga Slate Museum	Willunga	Adelaide suburbs	Mining	website, operated by the National Trust of South Australia, located in the Courthouse Museum stables, area slate mining
Winn's Bakehouse	Coromandel Valley	Adelaide suburbs	Local history	website, operated by the National Trust of South Australia
Whyalla Maritime Museum	Whyalla	Eyre Peninsula	Maritime	website, includes the landlocked HMAS Whyalla (J153), a Bathurst class corvette museum ship
Yankalilla District Historical Museum	Yankalilla	Fleurieu Peninsula	Local history	information
Wantok Place	North Adelaide	Adelaide	Artefacts	Papua New Guinea artefacts, owned by the Lutheran Church of Australia

== See also ==
- List of museums in Australia
