= Museum of Classical Archaeology =

Museum of Classical Archaeology may be:

- Museum of Classical Archaeology, Adelaide, Australia
- Museum of Classical Archaeology, Cambridge, England

== See also ==
- Ure Museum of Greek Archaeology, Reading, England
