= Lobethal Archives and Historical Museum =

Pioneer museum in South Australia

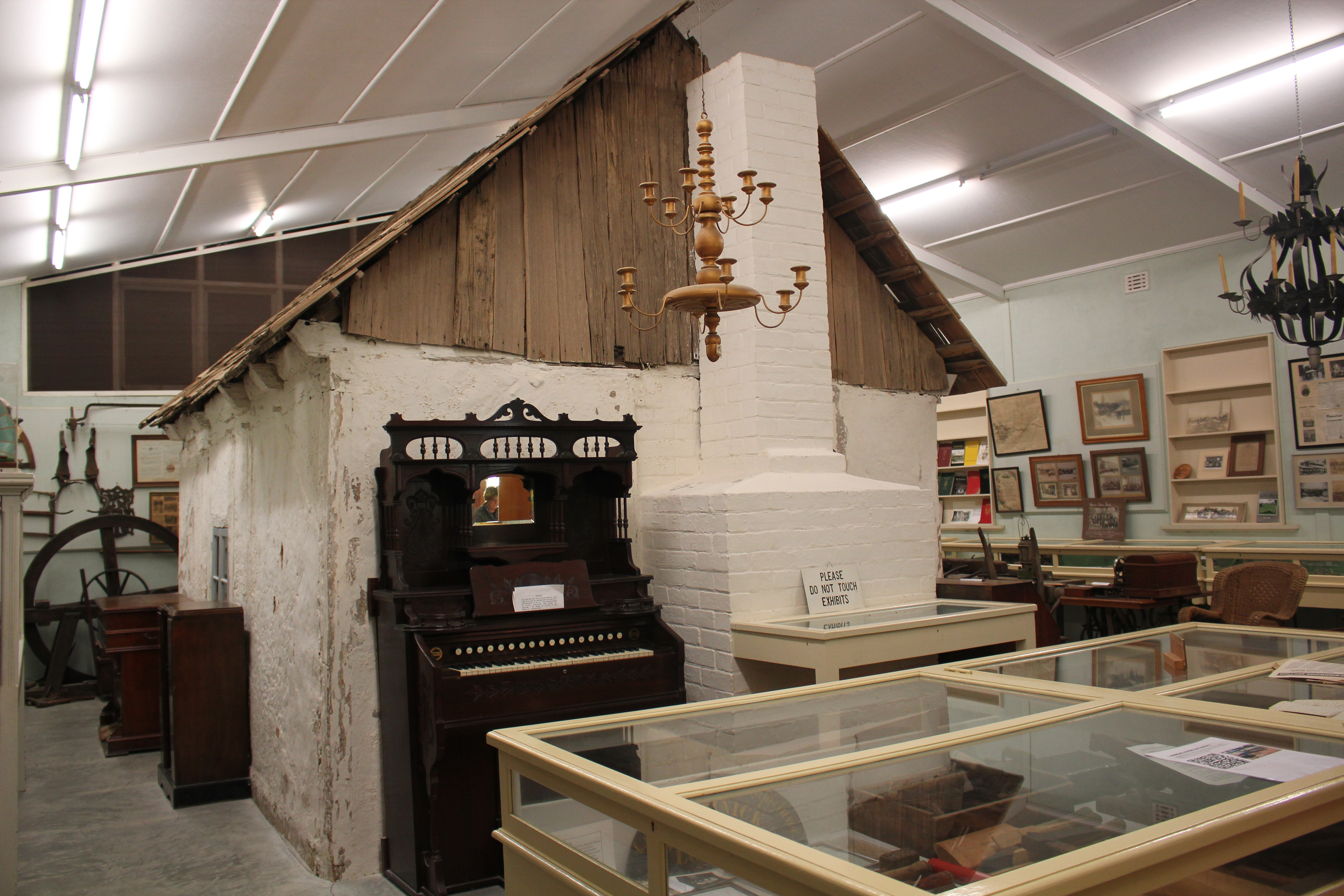
- Interior of Lobethal Archives and Museum showing the original Lutheran Seminary Building

- Location within South Australia
- Location: Lobethal, South Australia, Australia
- Coordinates: 34°54′16″S 138°52′39″E
- Accreditation: registered with History SA

The Lobethal Archives and Historical Museum is a German Pioneer Museum located in Lobethal in the Adelaide Hills in South Australia, opened in 1956.

The museum was founded on the collections of Jonas Vanagas, a Lithuanian migrant who settled in Lobethal after World War II. On 6 May 1956, the Premier Sir Thomas Playford officially opened the Lobethal Archives and Historical Museum, then called The Jonas Vanagas Collection. In its early years, the museum was housed in a room at the Lobethal Institute. In 1961, a modern museum was constructed using the original Lutheran seminary building. This seminary building was built in 1845 and is considered the earliest theological college in Australia as well as the oldest still in existence in the Southern Hemisphere.

The museum's main collection is a series of artefacts brought to Australia by German pioneers on the ship the Skjold in 1841 and also includes numerous historical documents about the early year of German settlement in South Australia. Displays include needlecrafts, woodwork and pictures made from human hair, feathers and wax, and other colonial artefacts. Other collections include original pictures of local industries and agriculture, cricket bats made at the Kumnick Cricket Bat Factory which was in operation in Lobethal from 1895 to 1956. The museum holds a collection of items relating to Clara Serena Kleinschmidt (1890-1972), the world famous opera singer who was born in Lobethal.

== See also ==
- List of museums in South Australia
