= National Military Vehicle Museum =

- Established: 1993; 33 years ago (Port Adelaide); 2008; 18 years ago (Endinburgh Parks)
- Location: 10 Sturton Road; Edinburgh SA 5111; Australia
- Coordinates: 34°43′34″S 138°37′46″E
- Type: Military Museum
- Public transit access: No
- Parking: Free onsite parking
- Website: http://www.military-vehicle-museum.org.au

The National Military Vehicle Museum, is a Military automobile museum in Edinburgh, South Australia, established in 1993.

The museum is housed in a group of historic WW2-era buildings within the Defence precinct of Edinburgh Parks, formerly part of the No.2 Explosives and Filling Factory, and is run by the Military Vehicle Preservation Society of South Australia (MVPSSA). The museum is quite unique in the sense that a large portion of the collection's vehicles are privately owned by the members of the MVPSSA, and the majority of those are maintained in running condition and are regularly used in support of events such as the Anazc Day march, Clipsal 500 and Christmas pageants.

Vehicles range from horse-drawn equipment from WWI through to modern military vehicles. The collection has a special focus on vehicles associated with South Australia's military history and includes vehicles built in Adelaide by General Motors Holden and the Islington Railway Workshops.

== Overview ==
The National Military Vehicle Museum, managed by the Military Preservation Society of South Australia, is dedicated to preserving and showcasing military vehicles and related artifacts. Run by passionate volunteers from the Society, the museum features a diverse collection of restored vehicles from World War I to the present with Military armoury, radio equipment and more, providing an immersive experience into military history.

== History ==
Founded in August 1993, the museum initially opened in Port Adelaide and later relocated to a set of historic World War II-era buildings at Edinburgh Parks. This unique location enhances the authenticity and historical connection of the exhibits, as many structures date back to the same era as some of the museum's artifacts.

== Exhibits ==
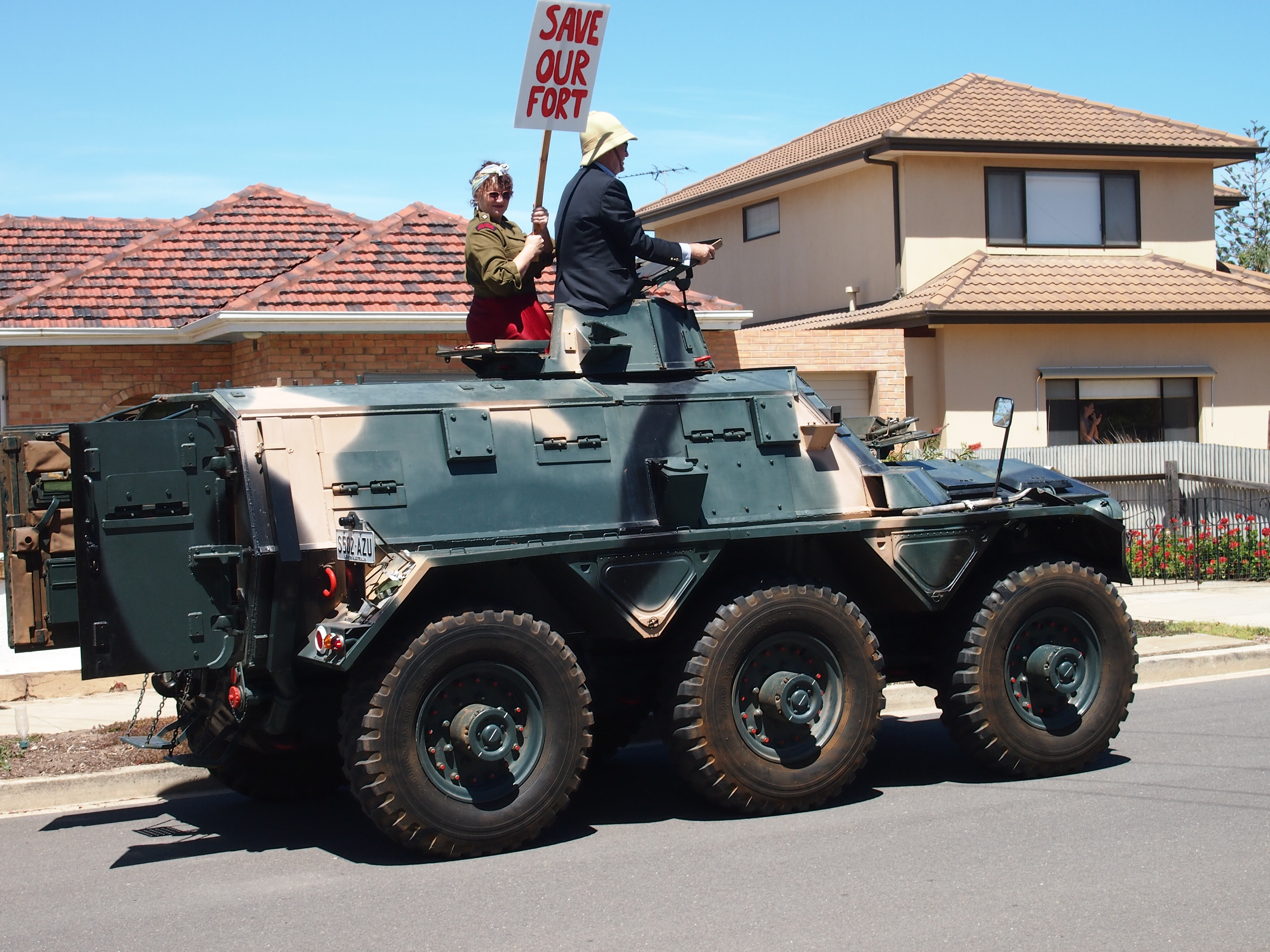
An Alvis Saracen from the museum took part in a community protest against the sale of Fort Largs in 2014.

The museum's collection comprises privately owned military vehicles meticulously restored to operational standards, enabling them to be road-registered and regularly driven. This hands-on approach ensures the vehicles are not only preserved but also functionally maintained, offering visitors a unique chance to witness these vehicles in action during special events. The exhibits cover a wide historical range, from early 20th-century military transportation to contemporary vehicles.

== Membership and Involvement ==
Visitors interested in military history and preservation are encouraged to join the Military Vehicle Preservation Society, which connects enthusiasts throughout Australia and globally. Members have the opportunity to volunteer at the museum, engage in events, and contribute to the preservation efforts.

== Publications ==
The Olive Drab magazine is a monthly publication published by the MVPSSA, which covers activities of the society and the museum. It is delivered either electronically or via mail to members of the society and to other third-parties.

== Gallery ==
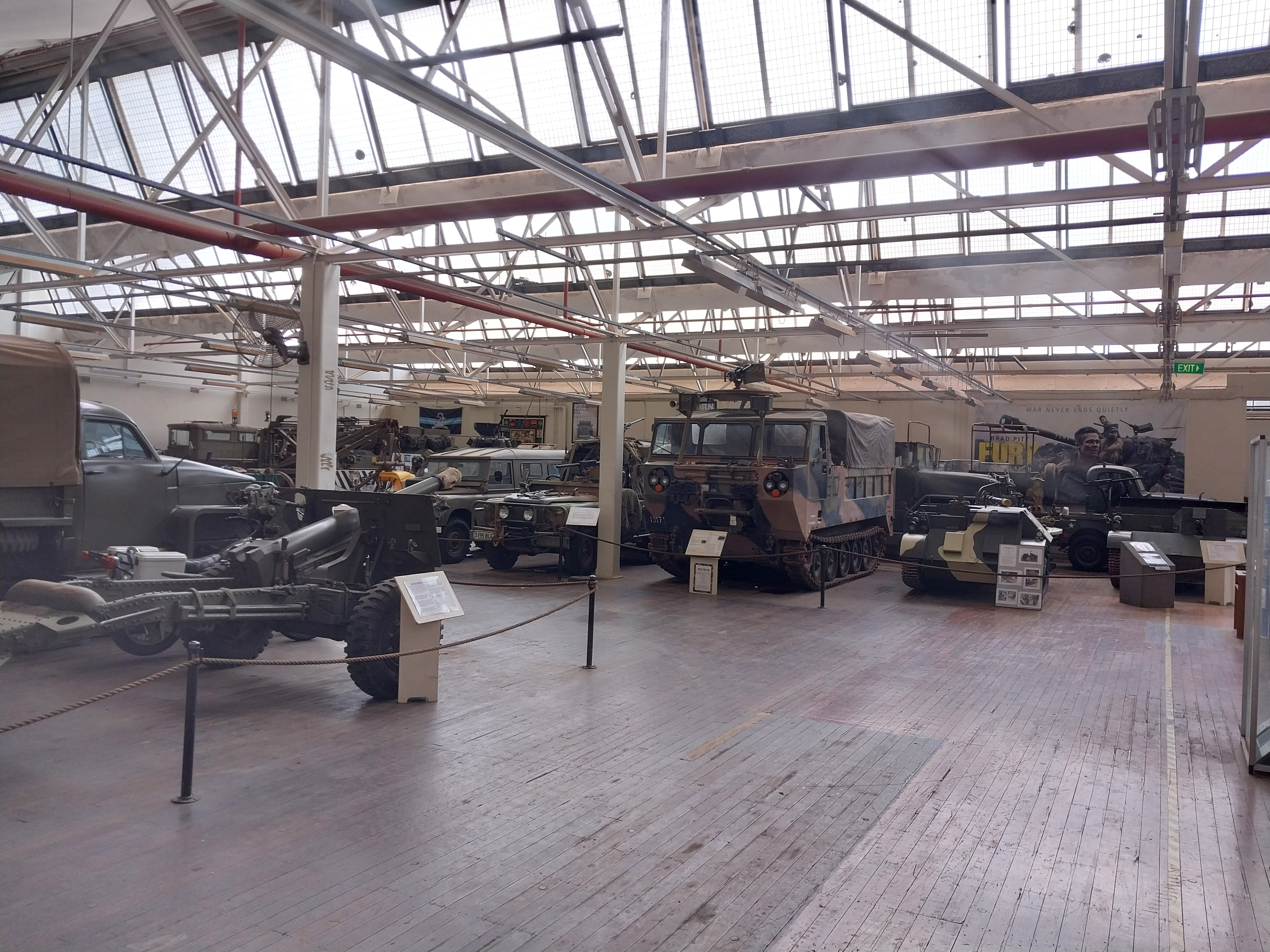

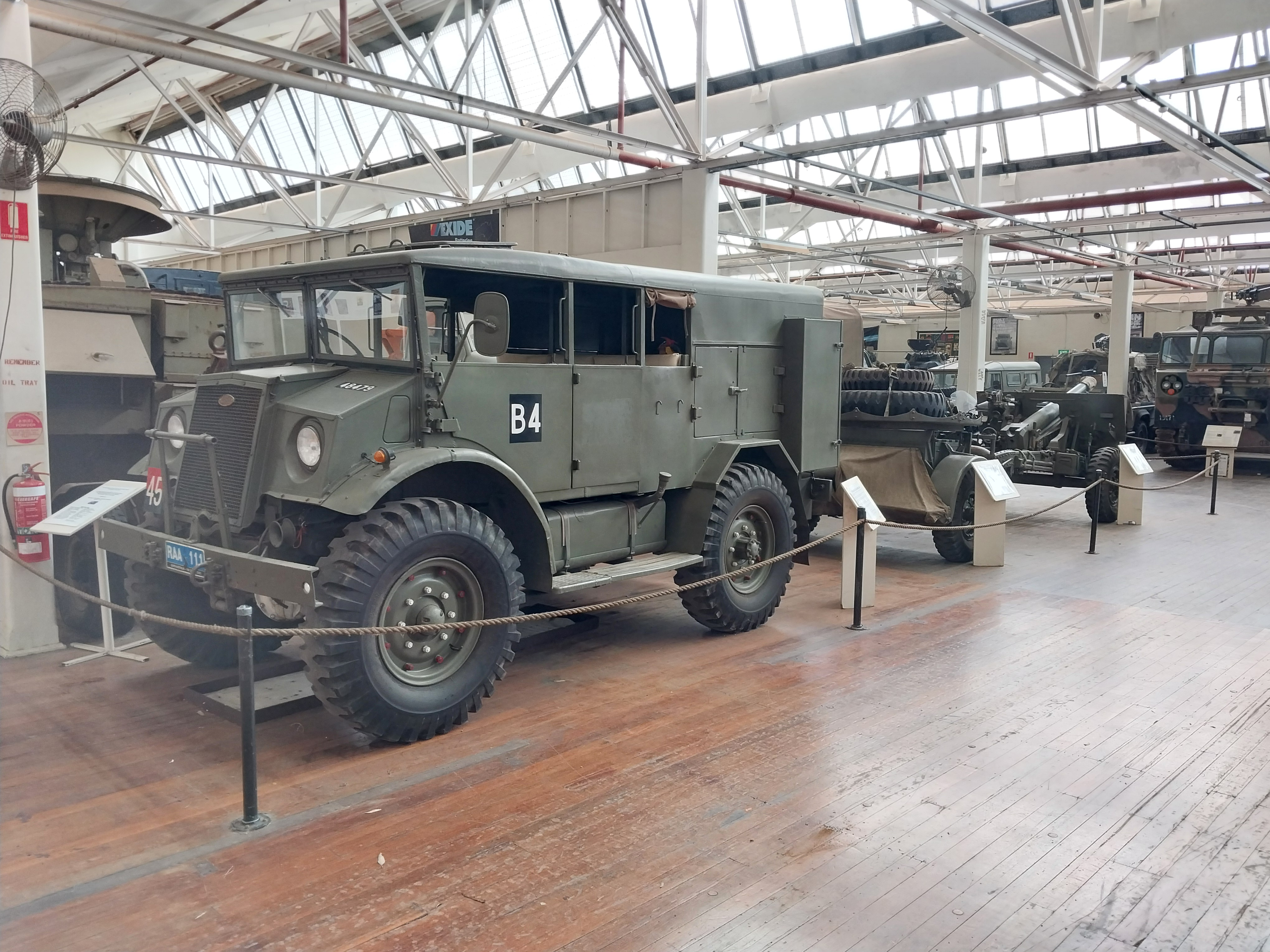

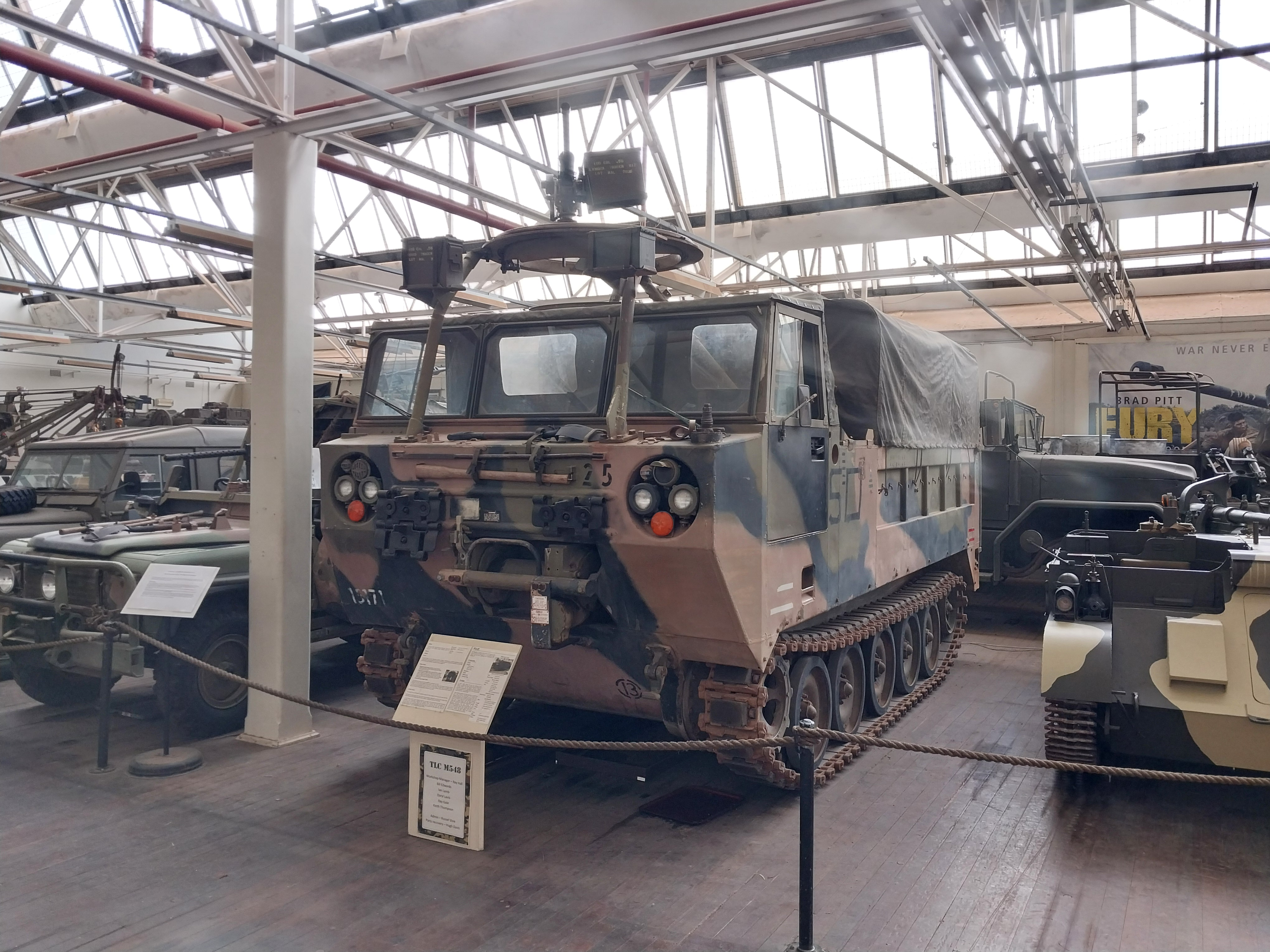

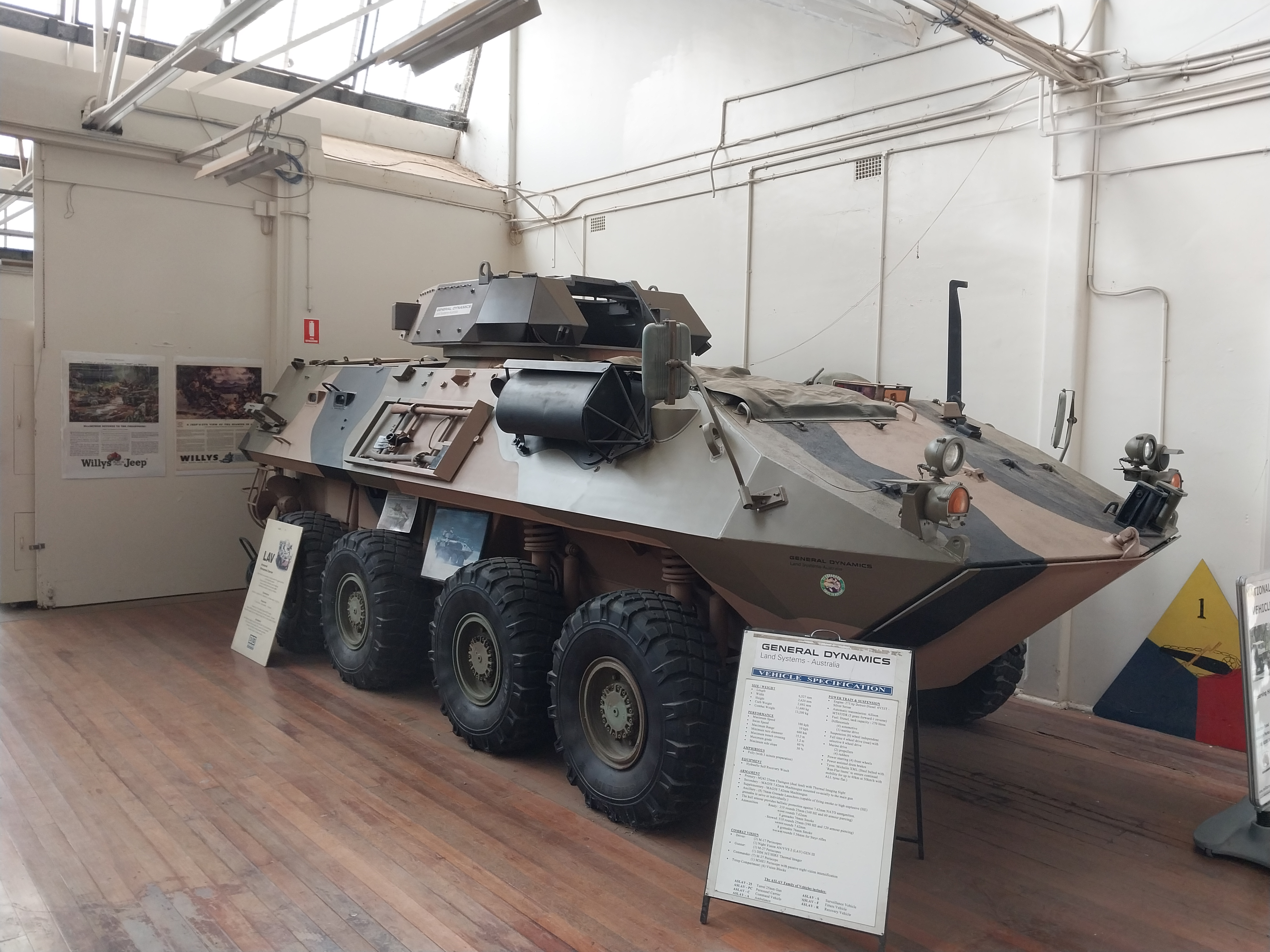

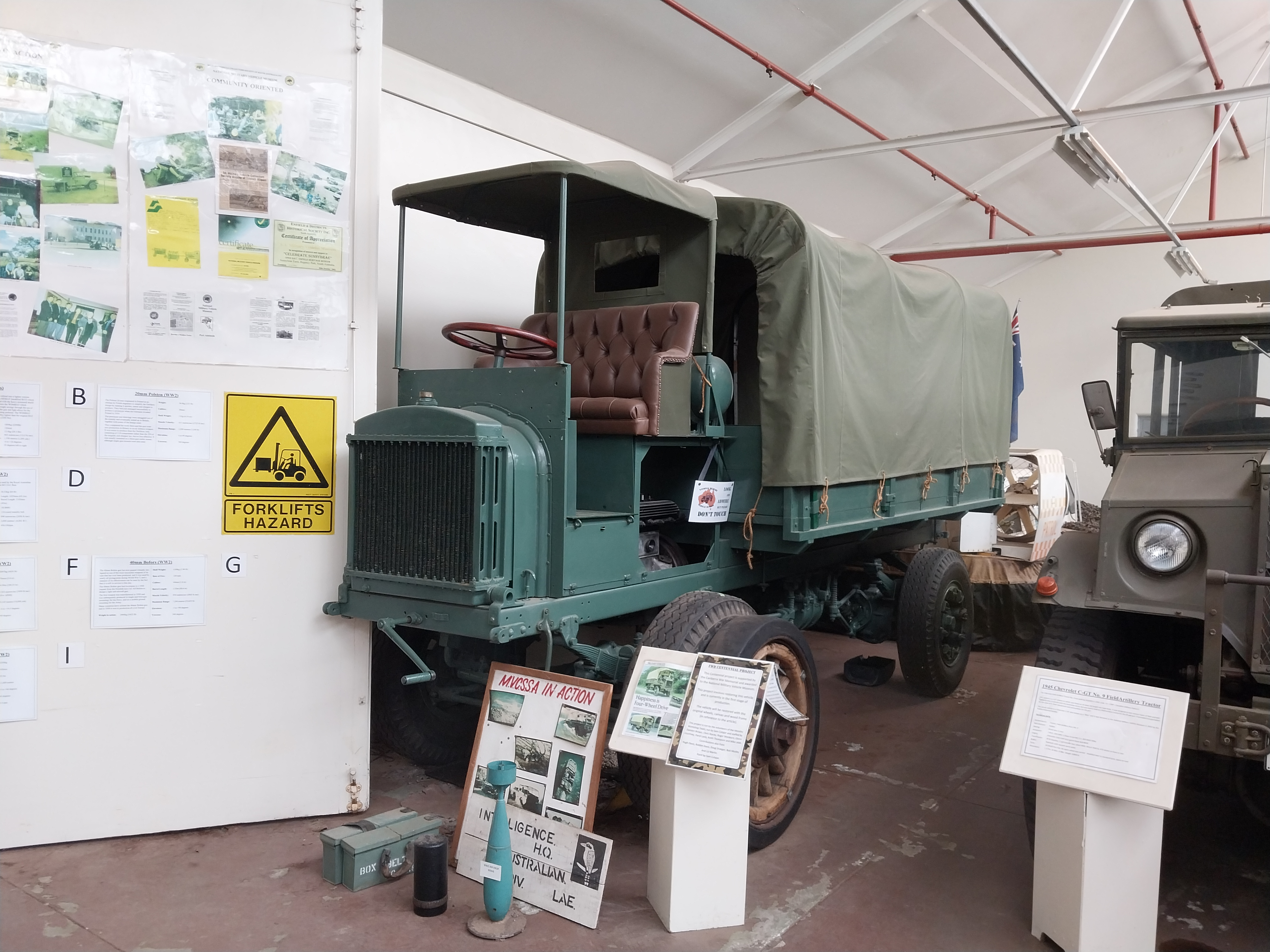

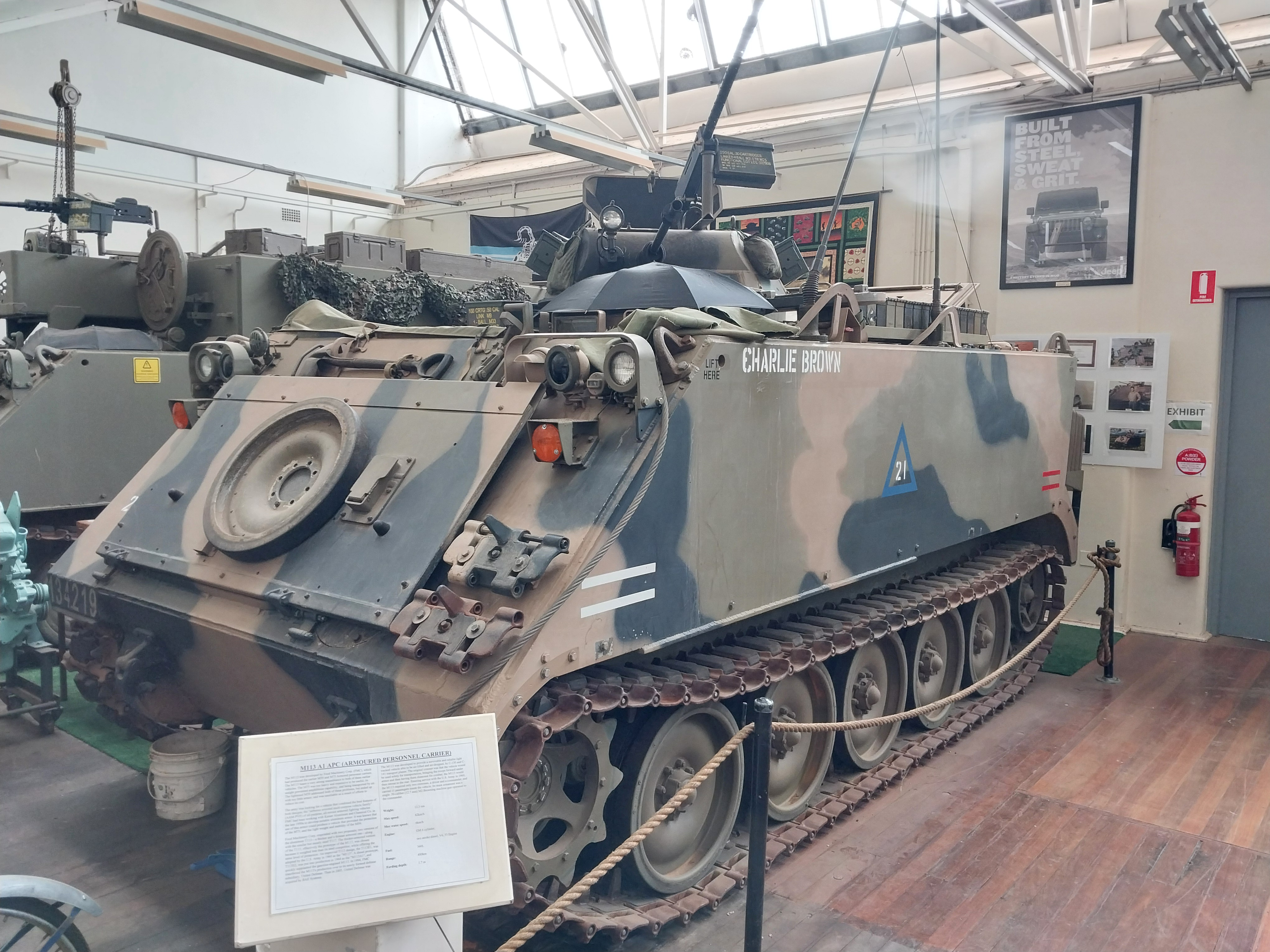

== See also ==
- List of museums in South Australia
- List of automobile museums
