= Bublacowie Military Museum =

Private military museum

Bublacowie Military Museum is a private museum on the Yorke Peninsula, South Australia on Brentwood Road, near the Bublacowie Road intersection. 34.9220°S 137.6106°E

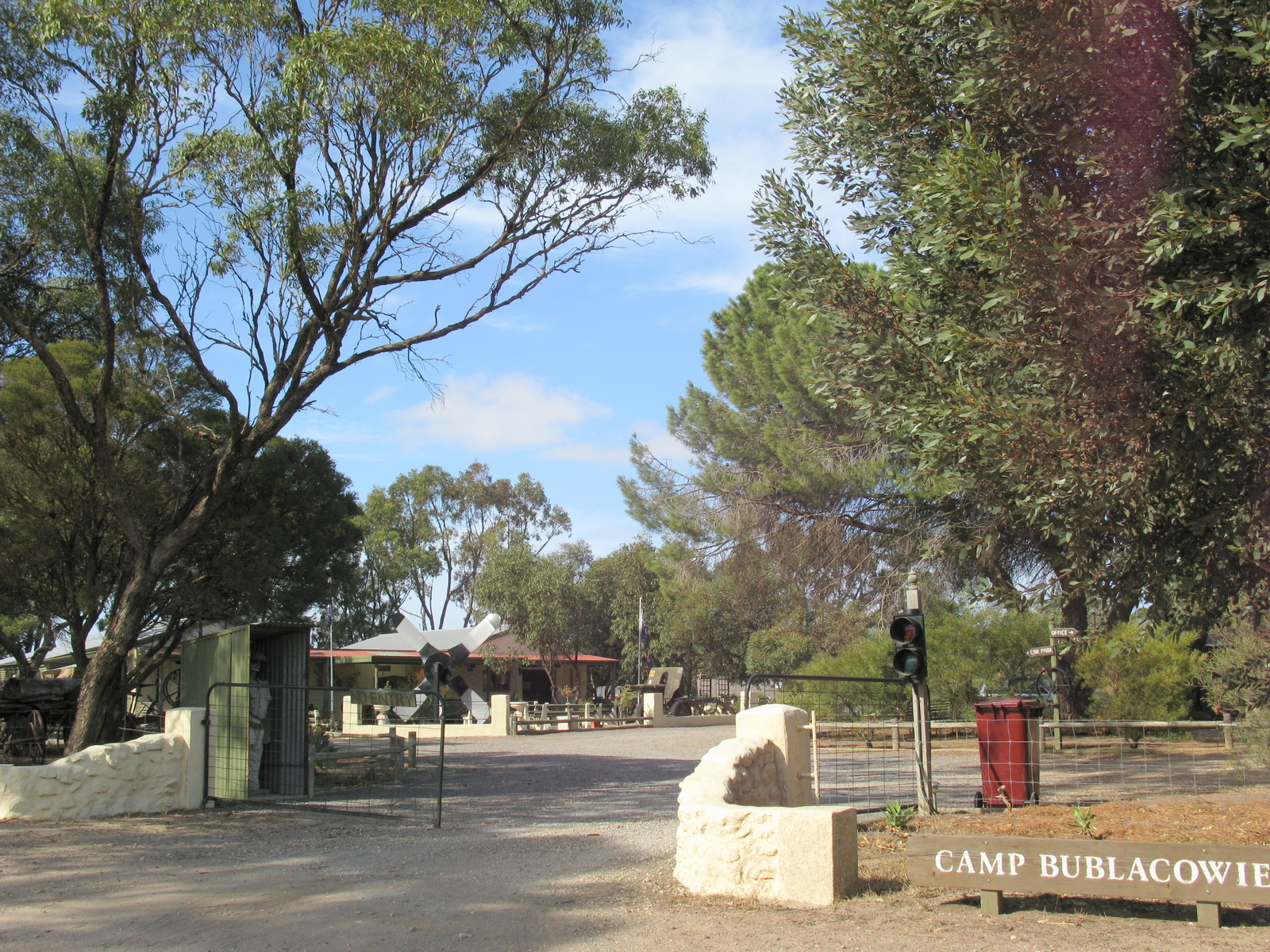

The museum was created by Christopher Soar, an Australian Army veteran of Malaya, Borneo and Vietnam conflicts. He was motivated by the need to preserve artefacts previously held by a Yorke Peninsula RSL club, then discarded when the club was disbanded. To this end, Soar purchased the old Bublacowie one-room schoolhouse (closed 1943), with Soar and his wife living in the attached residence. With the assistance of local volunteers, he acquired display cases for the smaller of those items and others since acquired, also some personal memorabilia.

Larger items include field cannon, military vehicles and a German Storch aircraft.

The museum attracts around 1,200 visitors per year and some 1,500 children on school excursions and hosts remembrance ceremonies on Anzac Day and Armistice Day.

== Gallery ==
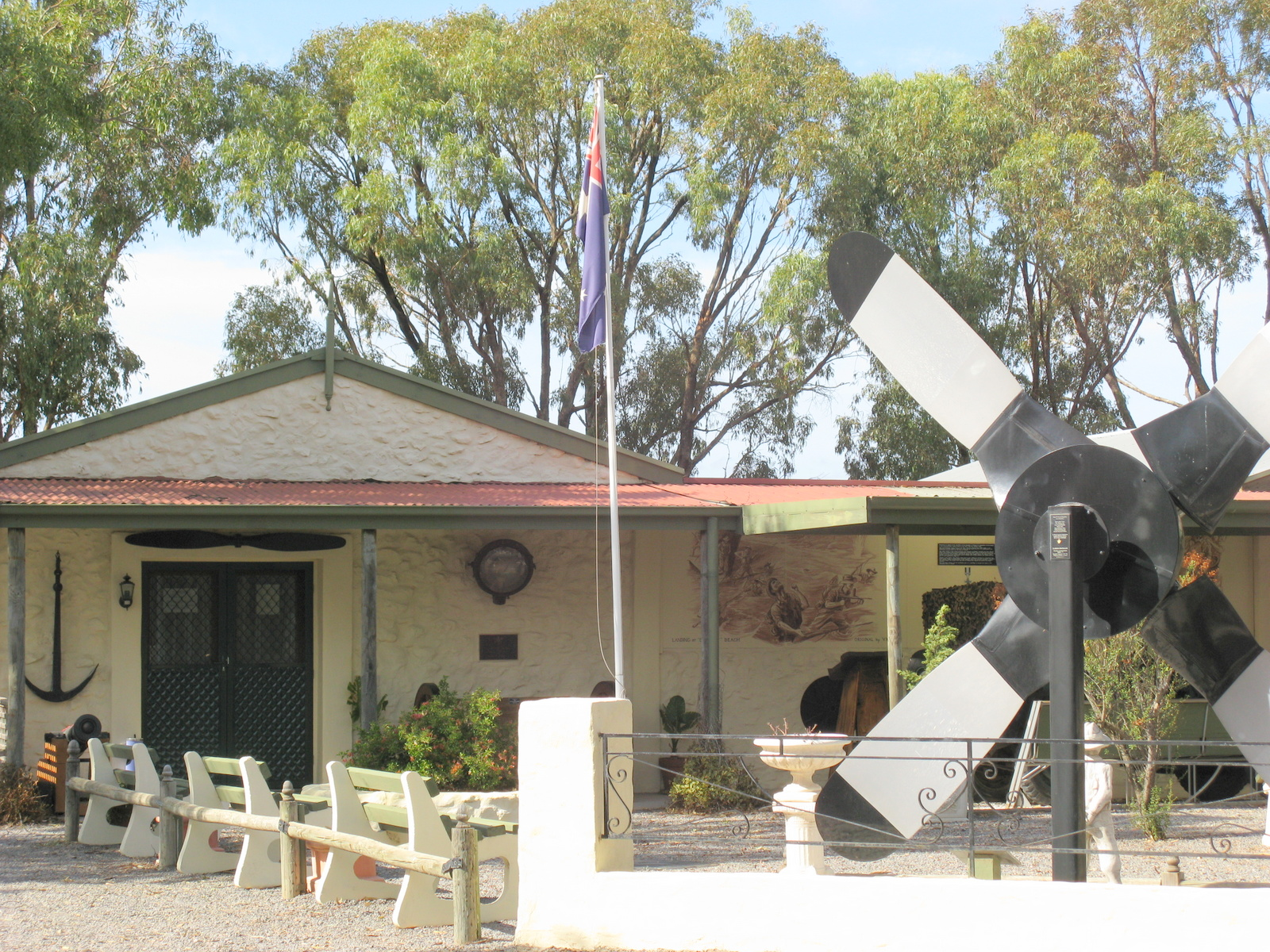
Main building

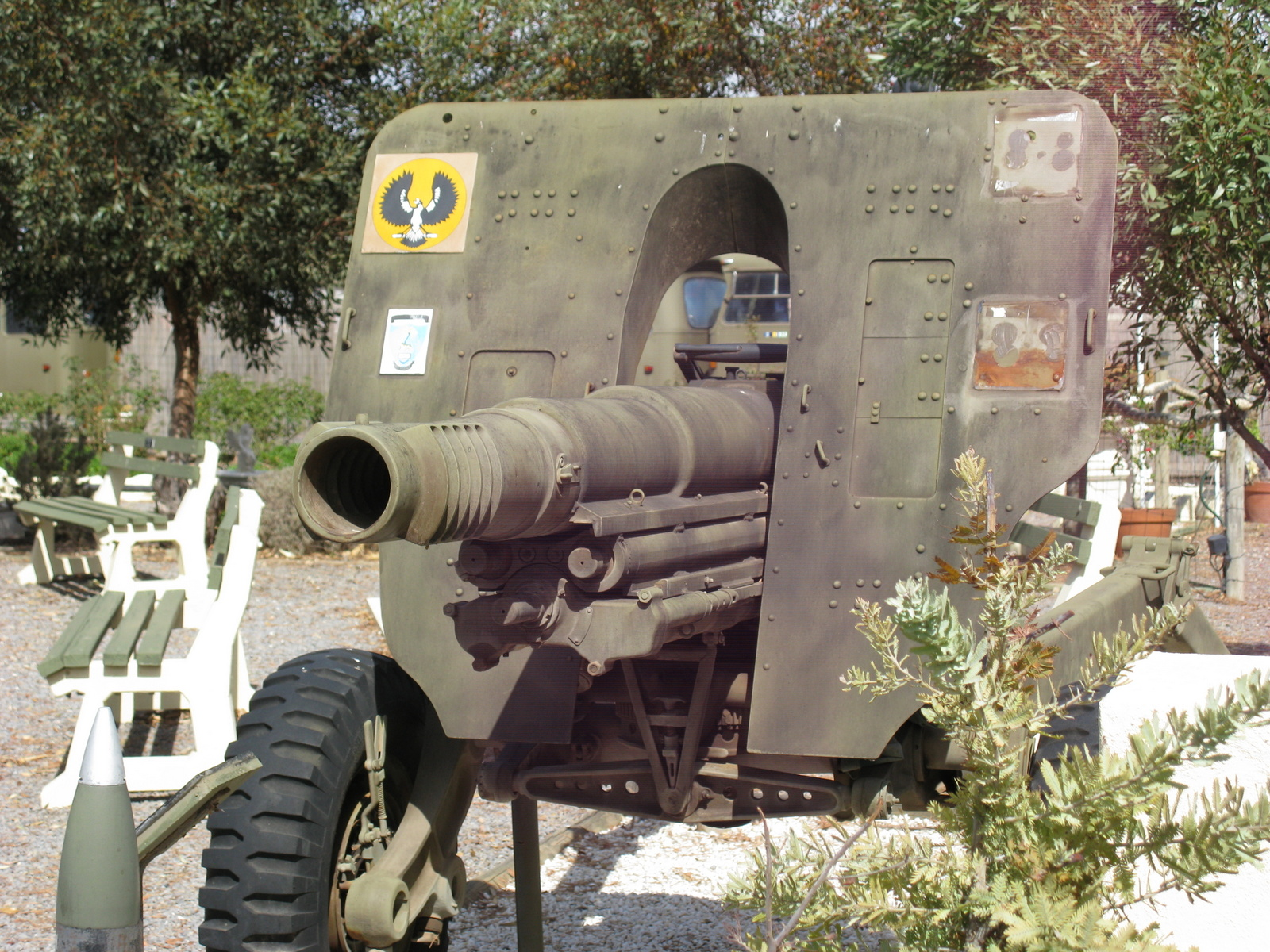
Gun exhibit

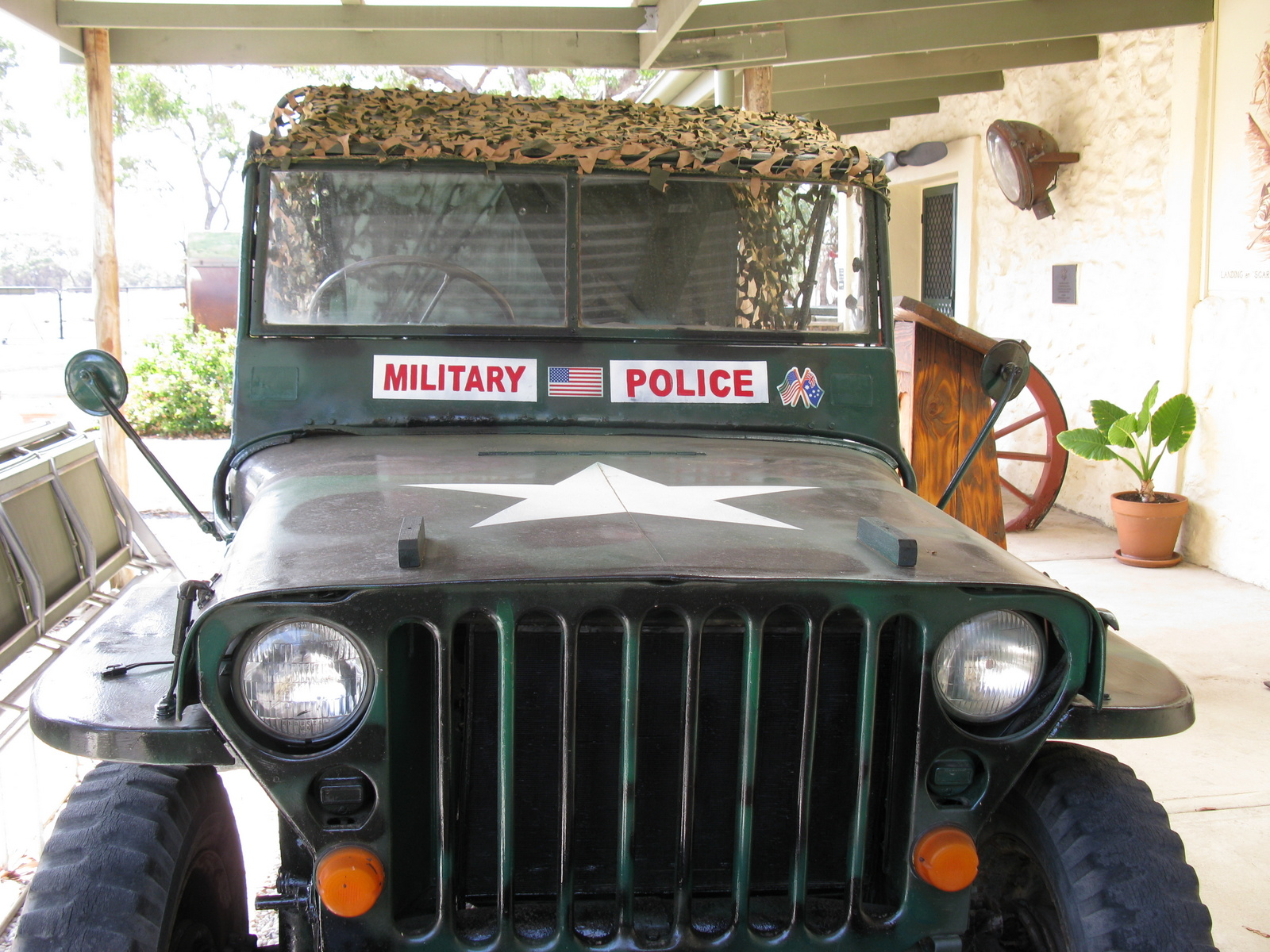
Jeep exhibit

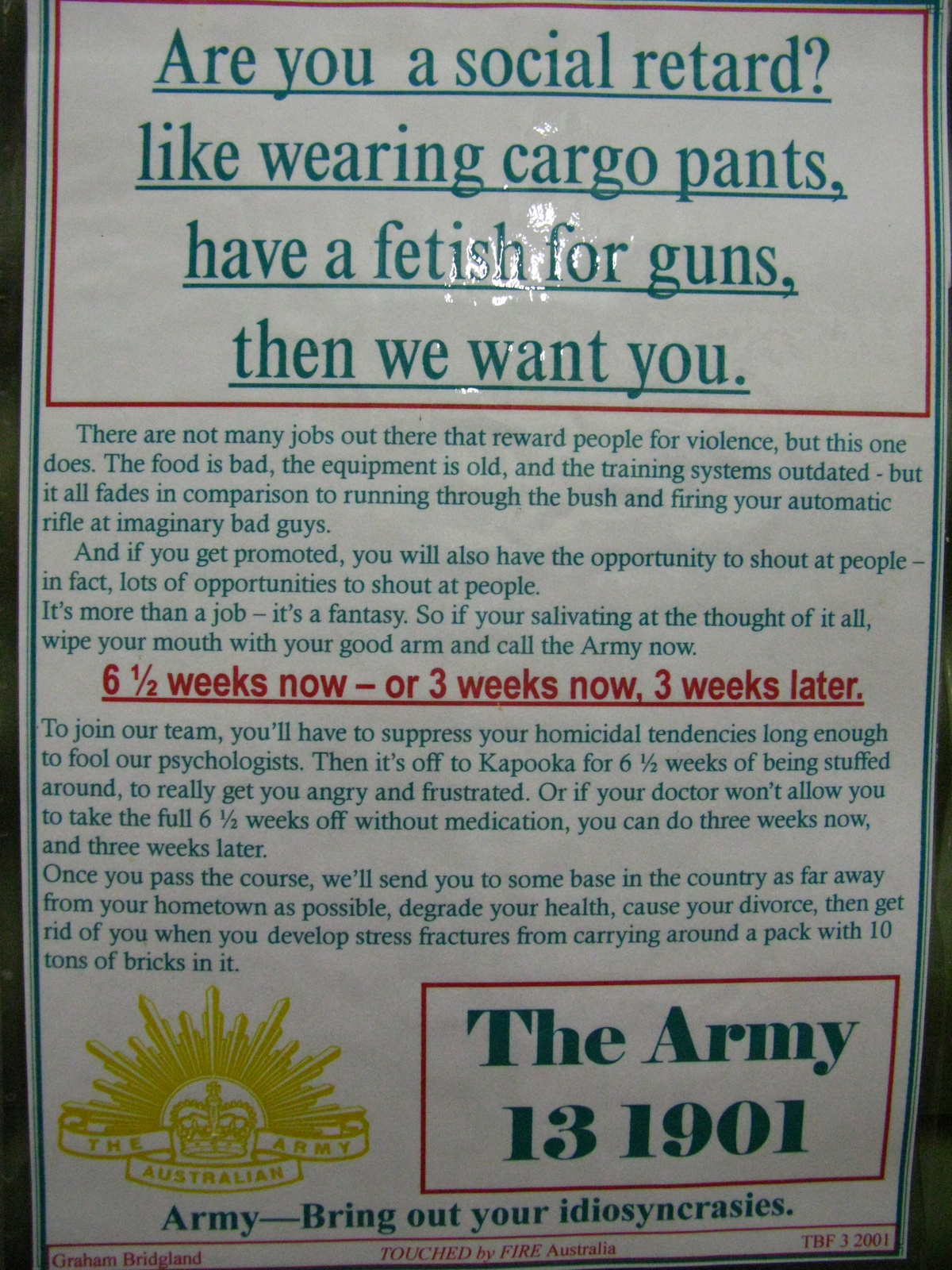
Satirical poster

== See also ==
- List of museums in South Australia
- Interview with owner and curator Chris Soar
