= Islington Sewage Farm =

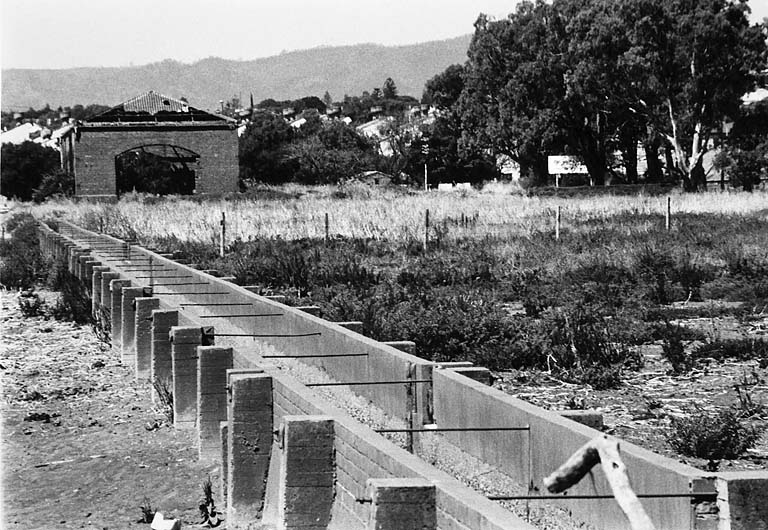
- Islington straining shed c. 1890 (facing east)
- Interactive map of the Islington Sewage Farm area
- Alternative names: Tam O'Shanter Sewage Farm

General information
- Status: Partly demolished with remainder heritage listed
- Location: Tam O'Shanter, South Australia, Adelaide
- Coordinates: 34°51′36″S 138°34′12″E
- Groundbreaking: 1879
- Opened: 1881
- Closed: 1966

The Islington Sewage Farm (also known as Tam O'Shanter Sewage Farm) was a sewerage treatment facility located at Tam O'Shanter Belt/Islington (now Regency Park) in South Australia, which operated from 1881 until 1966.

According to a 1996 heritage survey by the City of Enfield Islington Sewage Farm was claimed to be Australia's earliest "water borne waste disposal treatment system".

== History ==
In 1879 land that is now Regency Park was acquired by the City of Adelaide for the purpose of constructing the Islington Sewage Farm. The sewage farm commenced operation in 1881. In 1948, a concrete watercourse was extended to North Arm Creek (Port River) and the post-war population boom saw the sewage farm overloaded and raw sewerage diverted to the North Arm Creek. Plans for a new sewerage works for Adelaide commenced in 1960 and the treatment of sewerage was relocated to the Bolivar Waste Water Treatment Plant at Bolivar, 6 km (3.7 mi) to the north, in 1966. The Islington sewage farm was subsequently closed and the land fell into disuse. The new industrial suburb of Regency Park was created on the site.

From 1975 to 1981 parts of the former sewage farm were subdivided and sold off by the state government. The 4.5-acre (1.8 ha) former residence of the sewage farm manager, Sunnybrae Farm, was preserved and in 1981 was transferred to the City of Enfield and declared a Historic Conservation and Recreation Centre. The old farm buildings at Sunnybrae were restored by history enthusiasts in partnership with the council. The site now houses a function centre and includes a museum originally created by the local historical society. The 3,500-square-metre (38,000 sq ft) site of the straining shed about 400 m (1,300 ft) southeast of Sunnybrae Farm near Pedder Crescent was also preserved.

== Sunnybrae ==
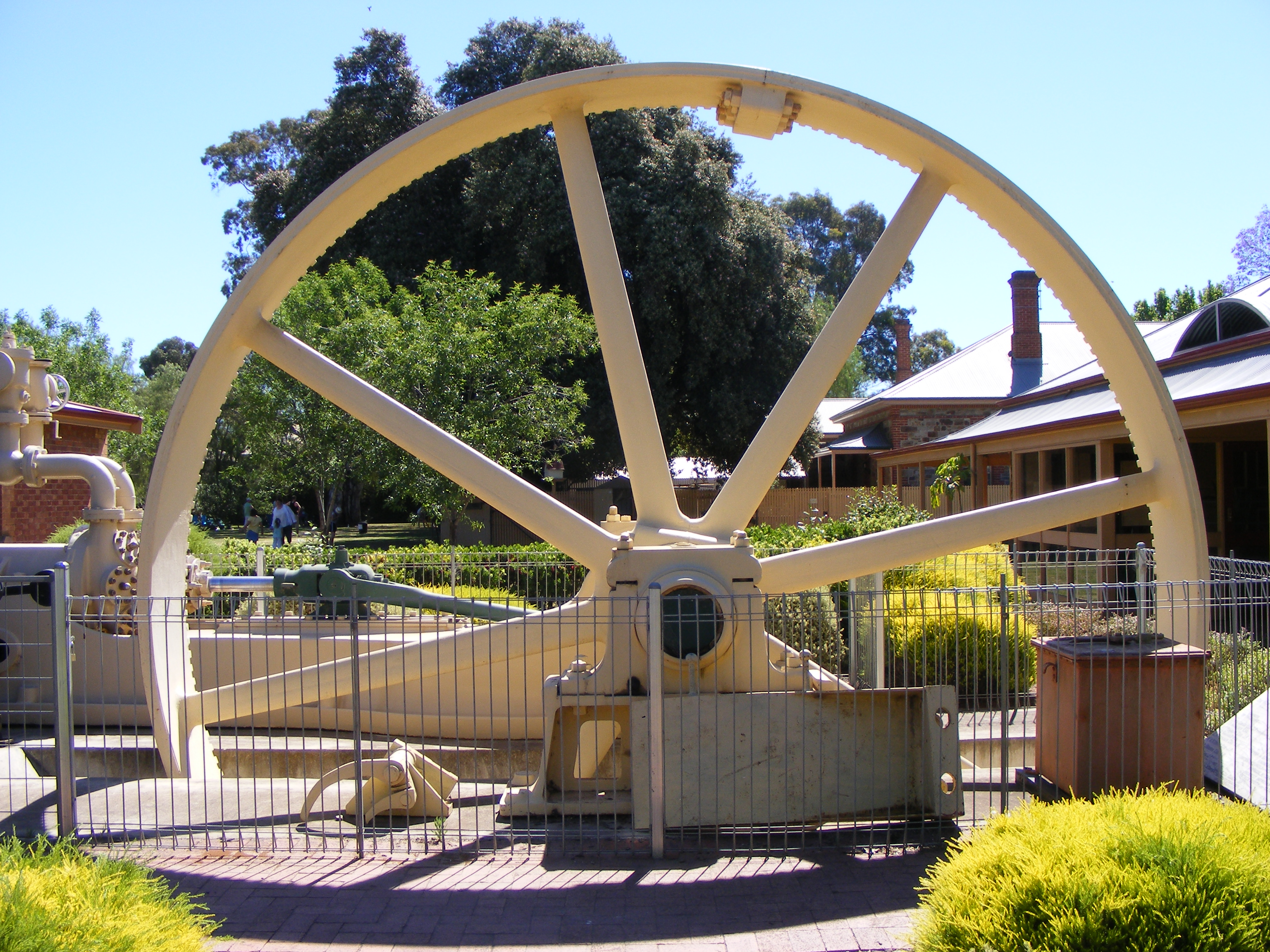
Historic flywheel once used by the SA Meat Corporation at Gepps Cross now housed at Sunnybrae Farm

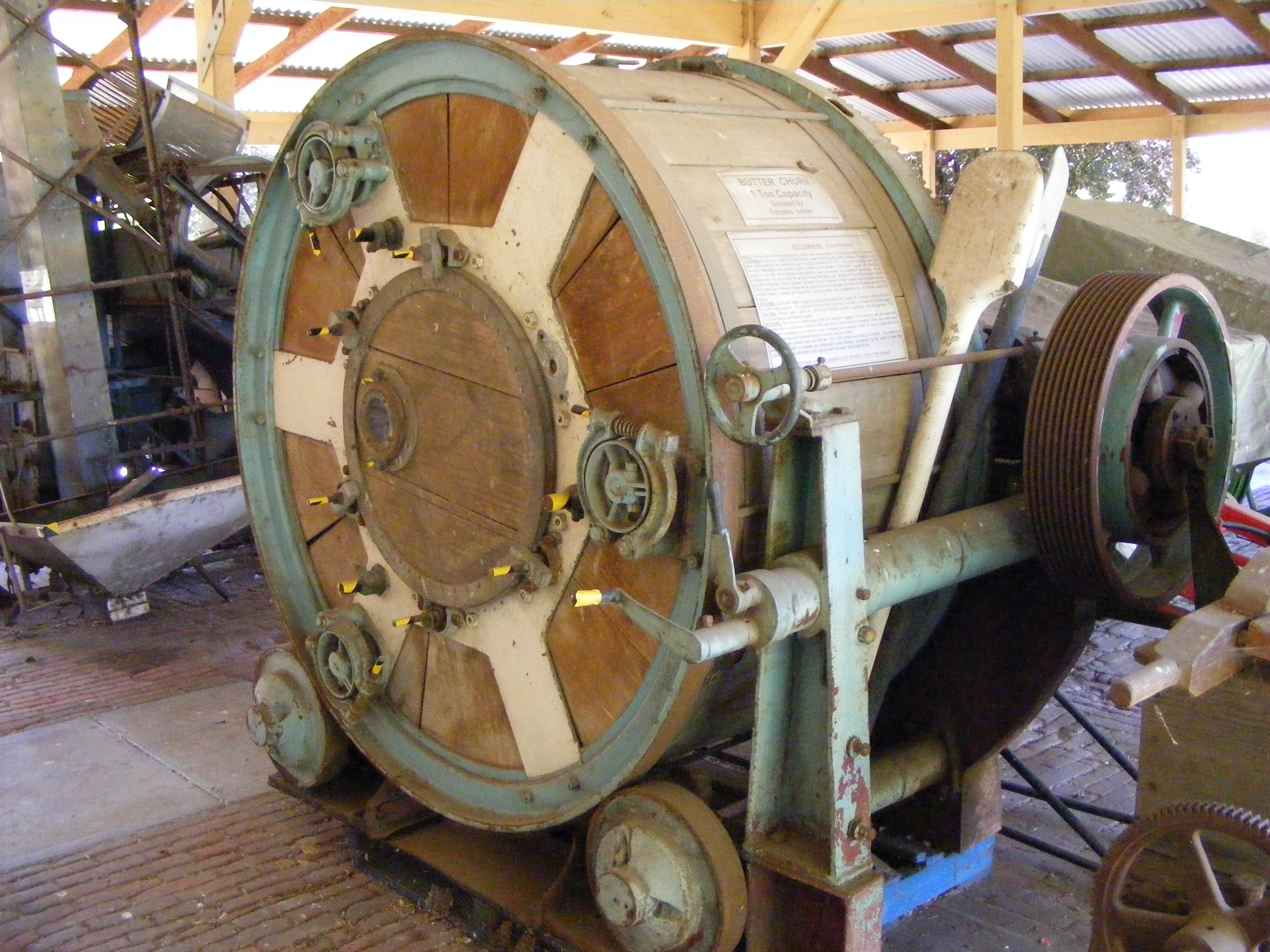
Butter churn on display at Sunnybrae Farm

Sunnybrae Farm Complex (34.871°S 138.575°E) is a heritage-listed site in Regency Park, South Australia. The historic Sunnybrae homestead was once the official residence of the sewage farm's manager. In addition to the manager's residence, the historic complex also includes "Dairymen's Quarters, Cheese Room and Cellars, Stables, Cow Shed and Smoke House". It was only used for dairying and cheese production in 1882 to 1884, but continued to be used for depasturing stock and vegetable and fruit production irrigated by the processed sewage.

In 1990 the City of Enfield gave the Enfield & Districts Historical Society the Sunnybrae property to house a museum celebrating local history. The museum was officially opened in June 1995. In 2001, the society built the Sunnybrae Farm Federation Pavilion with the assistance of a $28,000 Commonwealth grant. The society conducted open days and other public activities from 2002 to 2008. The historical society was dissolved in July 2012 and the property changed into private hands. It became known as Sunnybrae Estate, a commercially-owned function centre.

== Straining shed ==
Islington Sewage Farm Straining Shed
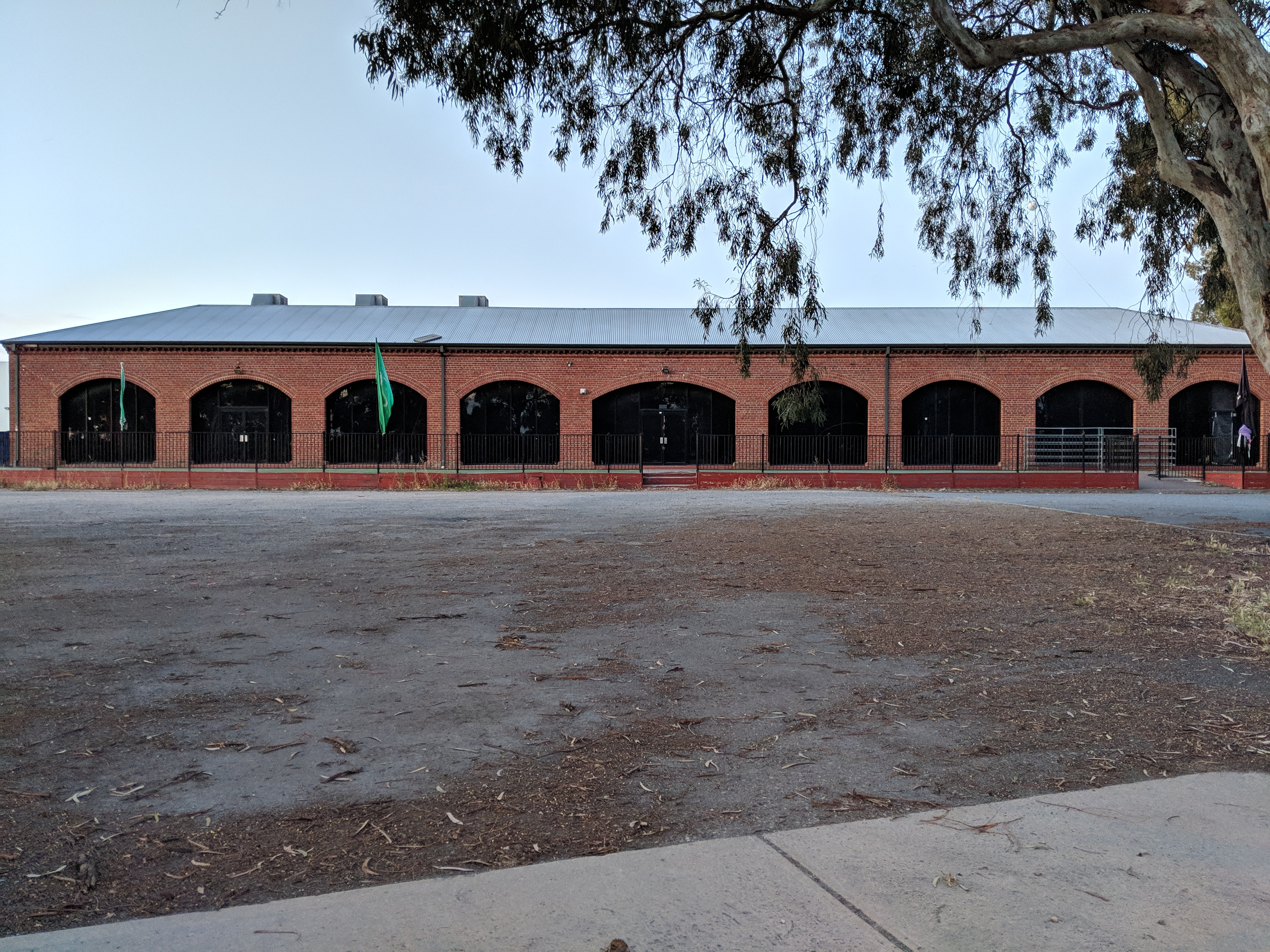
- Islington straining shed in 2018 (facing north)
- Interactive map of the Islington Sewage Farm Straining Shed area
- Alternative names: Tam O'Shanter Sewage Farm Straining Shed

General information
- Status: Heritage listed
- Location: Tam O'Shanter, South Australia, Adelaide
- Coordinates: 34°52′26″S 138°34′44″E
- Closed: 1966

The straining shed of the sewage farm was preserved from the 1970s land sale. As such the Islington Sewage Farm Straining Shed () was state heritage-listed in 1984 because it represents "part of a comprehensive waste treatment process of the late 19th century." The building is also an example of how seemingly basic public infrastructure of the era was designed and built to be visually eminent and symbolic of civic pride. It is sited about 400 m (1,300 ft) southeast of Sunnybrae Farm near Pedder Crescent in view of Regency Road.
