= Unley Museum =

Coordinates: 34°57′05″S 138°36′32″E

The Unley Museum
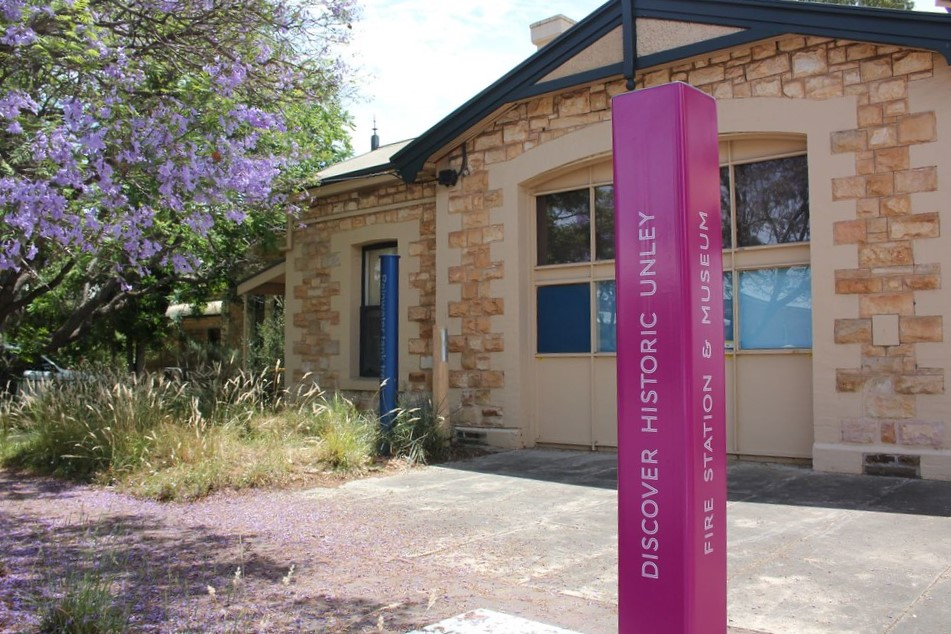
- Established: 1971
- Location: 80 Edmund Ave, Unley
- Type: Culture Museum
- Curator: Karen Paris
- Website: https://www.unley.sa.gov.au/facilities-events/unley-museum

The Unley Museum is a local history museum in Unley, South Australia located at 80 Edmund Avenue in the former Unley Fire Station building, built in 1898. It was founded as a museum in 1971, and operated by the City of Unley. The museum with five gallery spaces has more than 12,000 photographs and objects, and has grown from donations of Unley people. The Unley Museum incorporates several display galleries, a research library, and conducts research into house histories and families of Unley.

In 2012 The Unley Museum won the Museums and National Galleries Award MAGNA 2012 (Level 2), the nomination "Permanent Exhibition" for "Gorgeous Gardens". The judges described the project: "An engaging project, innovatively presented, well researched and visually appealing, with strong connections to a diversity of community members through a subject to which all can relate positively."

In 2016 The Unley Museum won the Museums and National Galleries Award MAGNA 2016 (Level 1), the nomination "Permanent Exhibition or Gallery Fitout" for the best permanent exhibition "200 Years of Change". This permanent exhibition tells about two centuries of history from the Kaurna people to Unley today. The interactive exhibition includes displays, photographs, videos and objects that could be touched and used in order to discover exciting stories about the history of Unley.

In 2017 the Unley Museum won the Museums and National Galleries Award MAGNA 2017 (Level 1), the nomination "Permanent Exhibition or Gallery Fitout" for the exhibition "Terrible Tales of Unley". The exhibition explores the stories from Unley's past related to mystery, murder, and fire. The interactive displays include activities to keep visitors entertained in order to solve an Unley mystery.

In 2019 the Unley Museum was awarded an Adelaide Fringe Festival Award for the contemporary art exhibition.

"Things of Nature". A contemporary art exhibition explores the significance of nature.

== Gallery ==
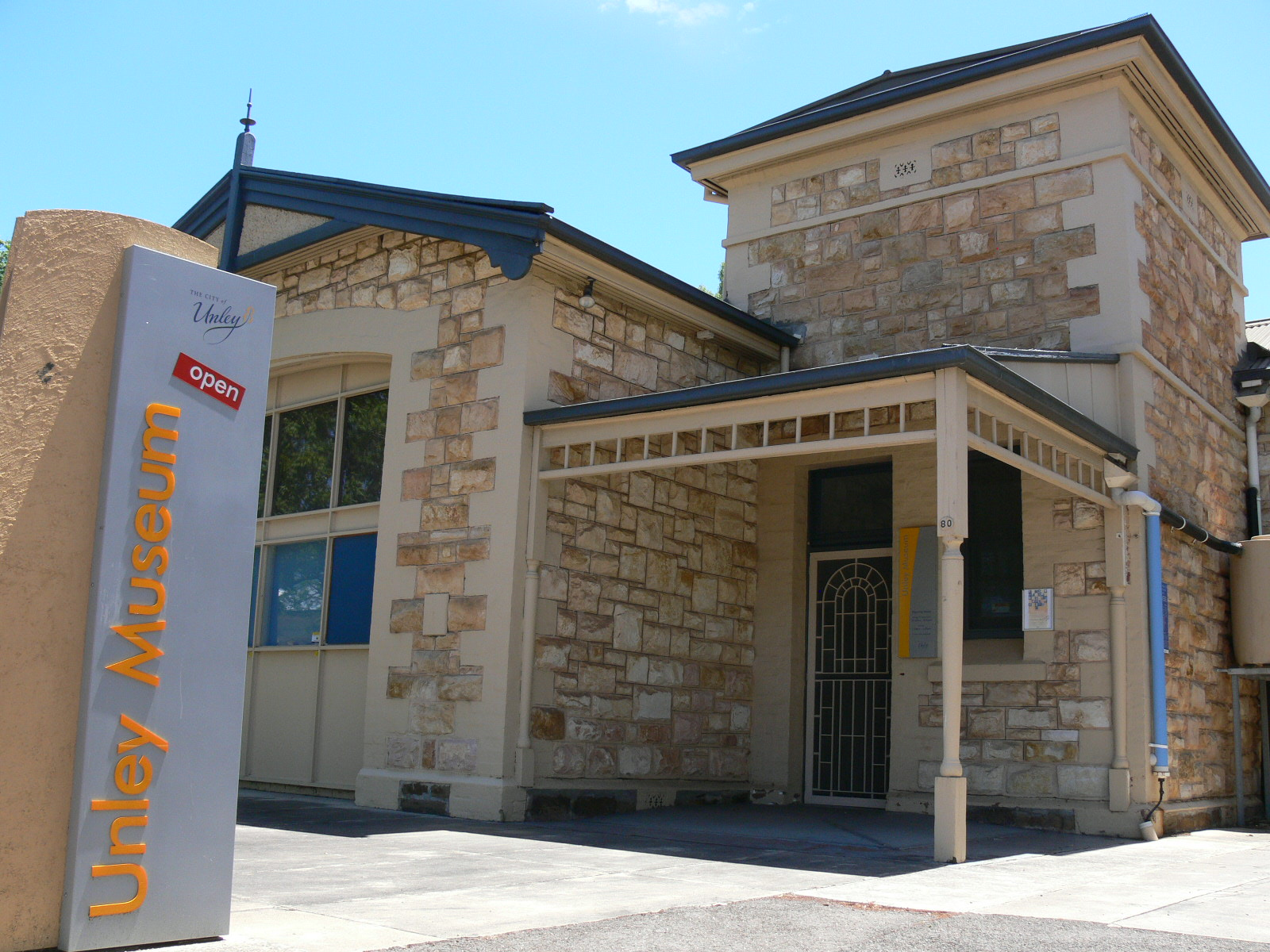
Museum entrance

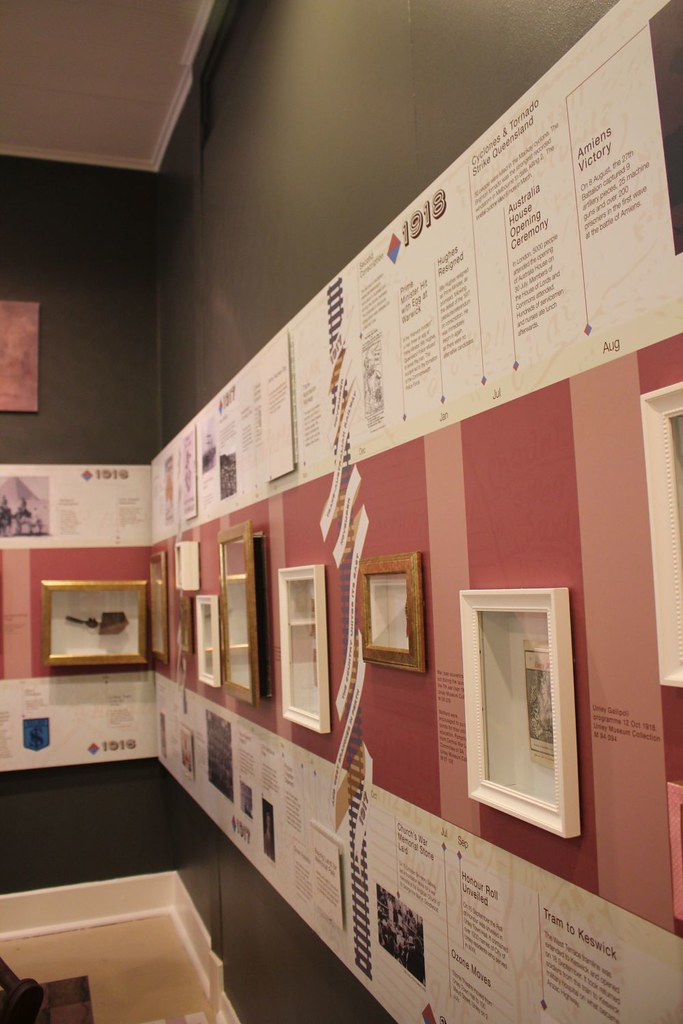
Permanent exhibition: "Unley: 200 Years of Change"
