= Museum of Classical Archaeology, Adelaide =

Classical archaeology museum in South Australia

The Museum of Classical Archaeology is teaching collection of the School of Humanities at Adelaide University in South Australia.

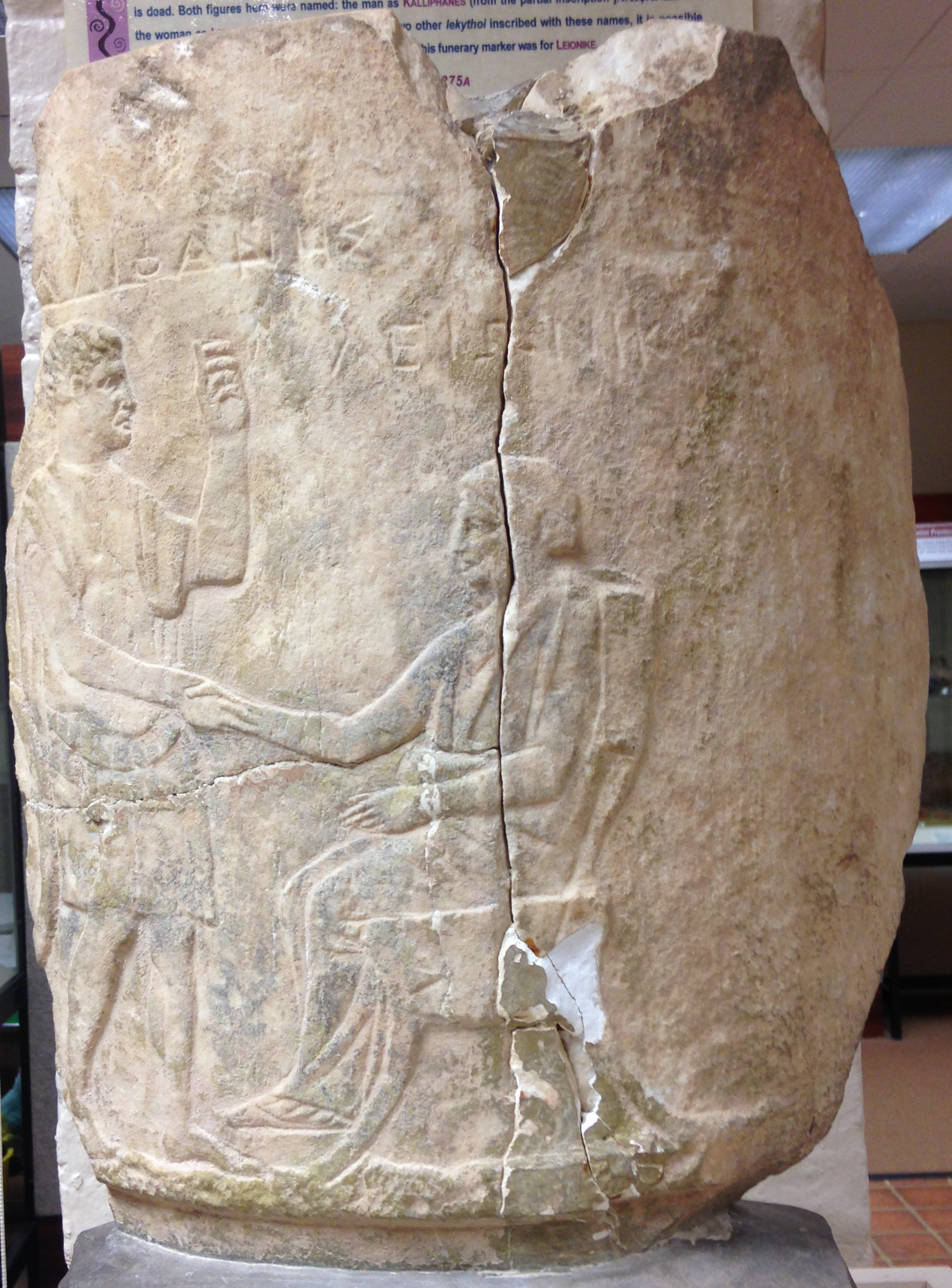
Attic marble funerary lekythos fragment

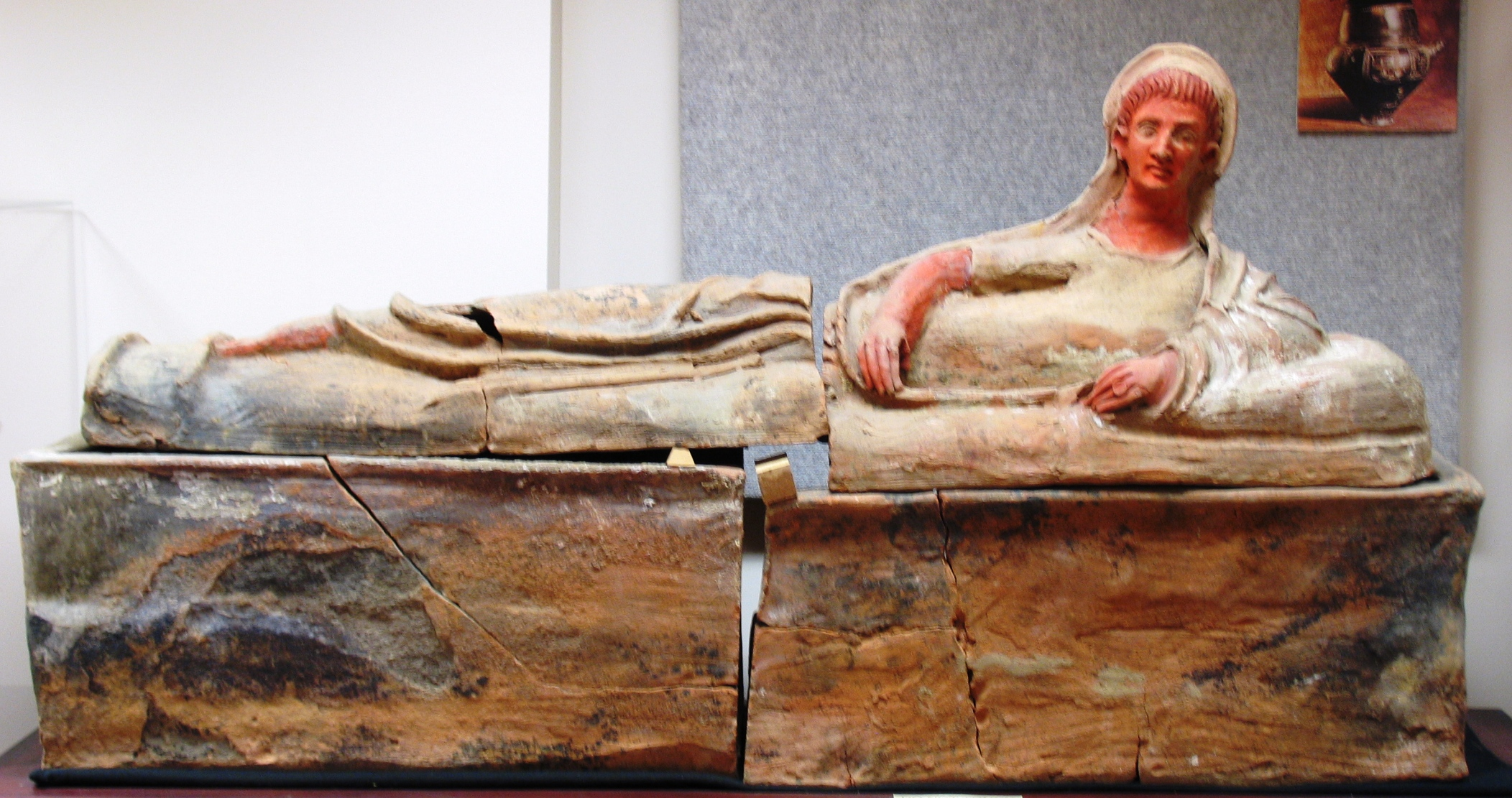
Tarquinian painted terracotta sarcophagus

== History of the collection ==
As early as 1910, H. Darnley Naylor, the Hughes Professor of Classics at the University of Adelaide, anticipated that a future and "much-needed classical and historical museum" would incorporate a recent donation of ancient coins to the university. Further coin collections were added in the 1920s and 1930s. It was only in the 1960s, however, that the Classics Department acquired a display case and a small collection of antiquities, mostly Greek pottery, which had been housed within the department. As the teaching of Greek and Roman archaeology grew at Adelaide, so too did the collection. In 1979, students and staff created a large model of Athens for a temporary exhibition within the university. By 1980, the collection had outgrown its location, and the university agreed to locate it within the grand Henry Basten Room, upstairs in the historic Mitchell Building on North Terrace. It opened to the public in 1983, under the directorship of Dr Frank Sear. Staffing was provided by the department.

In addition to objects owned by the university, the new Museum of Classical Archaeology included Greek and Roman objects on long-term loans from the store-rooms of the South Australian Museum and the Art Gallery of South Australia. This generous collaboration continues to this day. The Greek community in Adelaide has long supported the department in its teaching and outreach activities. The committee of the longstanding Greek Glendi Festival donated some forty casts of Classical and Hellenistic sculptures from the Greek Government.

To celebrate the opening of the museum in 1983, the University Foundation funded the acquisition of a Corinthian bronze helmet – a type that was popular in the 6th century BC – whilst Professor A. D. Trendall donated a Campanian late Classical lekythos by the Pagenstecher Group. The "Friends of the Museum" was also launched at the opening, to support the outreach programme of public talks about classical archaeology, and to raise money for further acquisitions. An opportunity presented itself the next year, when the personal collection of the late Arthur Dannatt came on the market in Adelaide. With the substantial support of the Friends, his collection was added to the museum in its entirety. In so doing, the museum expanded its cultural horizons, for Dannatt had acquired not only Greek, Etruscan and Roman small objects, but also objects from Egypt and Mesopotamia.

In the early 1990s, Sear took up the Chair of Classics at the University of Melbourne. Under the directorship of his successor, Dr. Margaret O'Hea, Near Eastern cultures have been added to the museum, including material donated by Sydney University's excavations at Pella. The museum continues to grow as a result of private donations. Financial considerations in the 1990s made it impossible to continue to keep the museum open, but school groups can pay to visit the museum, and in recent years, the enthusiasm of the Alumni volunteers of the university have made it possible to re-open the museum on the first Tuesday of the month during the academic year. The museum now has a Facebook page, and public archaeology lectures in Adelaide are advertised there and on Eventbrite.

== Highlights ==
Egyptian artifacts include a representative collection of funerary amulets, figurines and funerary equipment from the New Kingdom to the Late Period. On permanent loan from the Student Union is a fragmentary table of offerings and stele from New Kingdom Egypt, acquired at the start of the 20th century by Lady Symons. Some pottery from graves excavated by John Garstang at Beni Hassan in Middle Egypt is also on loan here from the SA Museum and AGSA.

The Near Eastern collection includes Paleolithic and Neolithic stone tools from the 1994-1996 Pella Hinterland Survey in the north Jordan Valley and pottery from Bronze Age and Iron Age tombs excavated by the Sydney University Expedition to Pella in Jordan. There is also pottery, some cuneiform tablets and figurines from the site of Ur in southern Mesopotamia.

The Eastern Mediterranean is also represented by a representative range of Early Bronze Age to Iron Age pottery from Cyprus. In addition to pottery and lamps from the Late Bronze Age to Hellenistic periods, the Greek collection includes both the Corinthian bronze helmet, mentioned above, and a fragment of a Late Classical marble lekythos from Attica, showing the deceased Leonike and her husband Kalliphanes (Clairmont Catalogue 7.330).

Italian cultures before the rise of Rome are also represented, particularly Villanovan and Etruscan pottery and bronzes. The painted terracotta sarcophagus (Gentili Catalogue B150) dates from the period of Roman domination of Etruria (modern Tuscany), showing a young man reclining as if for a feast on its lid. Highlights of the Roman collection include small bronze figurines from Gaul and Egypt, as well as marble funerary sculptures. Objects from Roman and early Byzantine Egypt also include terracotta figurines (on loan from SAM), a fragment of Coptic textile and a souvenir pilgrim flask of Saint Menas. A small number of early Islamic and mediaeval objects are also on display, to highlight the continuity and changes of material culture in the post-Roman world.

There is also a wide-ranging display of glassware, from Mycenaean flat beads, a core-formed aryballos of the Classical period, to Roman and Byzantine blown and mould-blown vessels.
