= 1893 South Australian House of Assembly election =

1893 South Australian colonial election (House of Assembly)
- 15 April – 6 May 1893
- All 54 seats in the South Australian House of Assembly; 28 seats needed for a majority
- Turnout: 49,833 (67.6%)
| Party | Leader | Vote % | Seats | +/– |
|---|---|---|---|---|
| National Defence | John Downer | 22.2 | 18 | +18 |
| United Labor | John McPherson | 18.8 | 10 | +10 |
| Independents | N/A | 59.0 | 26 | −28 |
This lists parties that won seats. See the complete results below.
| Premier before | Premier after |
|---|---|
| John Downer | John Downer |

The 1893 South Australian House of Assembly election was held between 15 April and 6 May 1893 to elect all 54 members of the South Australian House of Assembly as part of the 1893 South Australian colonial election.

== Overall results ==
House of Assembly (AV) – Turnout 67.6% (Non-CV)
| Party | Votes | | | Seats | |
| Party | Votes | % | Swing (pp) | Seats | Change |
|---|---|---|---|---|---|
| Independent | 51,805 | 59.0 | –41.0 | 26 | ▼28 |
| National Defence | 19,438 | 22.2 | New | 18 | ▲18 |
| United Labor | 16,458 | 18.8 | New | 10 | ▲10 |
| Total | 87,701 | 100.0 | – | 54 | |
| Formal votes | 49,184 | 98.7 | +0.3 | | |
| Informal votes | 649 | 1.3 | –0.3 | | |
| Turnout | 49,833 | 67.6 | +14.5 | | |
| Enrolled voters | 73,619 | – | – | | |
Source: Electoral Commission of South Australia

== Results by district ==
=== Albert ===
1893 South Australian colonial election: Albert
| Party | Candidate | Votes | % | ±% |
|---|---|---|---|---|
| National Defence | George Ash (elected 1) | 741 | 29.7 | −3.1 |
| National Defence | Andrew Dods Handyside (elected 2) | 632 | 25.3 | −1.2 |
| Independent | Archibald Peake | 577 | 23.1 | +23.1 |
| Independent | Beaumont Arnold Moulden | 545 | 21.8 | −2.5 |
| Total formal votes | | 1,285 | 99.1 | +0.7 |
| Informal votes | | 12 | 0.9 | −0.7 |
| Turnout | | 1,297 | 75.6 | +10.3 |

=== Barossa ===
1893 South Australian colonial election: Barossa
| Party | Candidate | Votes | % | ±% |
|---|---|---|---|---|
| National Defence | James Hague (elected 1) | 1,011 | 30.4 | +8.8 |
| National Defence | John Downer (elected 2) | 1,008 | 30.3 | +4.9 |
| United Labor | James Jones | 685 | 20.6 | +20.6 |
| Independent | JH Schickel | 623 | 18.7 | +18.7 |
| Total formal votes | | 1,907 | 98.9 | +0.1 |
| Informal votes | | 22 | 1.1 | −0.1 |
| Turnout | | 1,929 | 71.4 | +4.6 |

=== Burra ===
1893 South Australian colonial election: Burra
| Party | Candidate | Votes | % | ±% |
|---|---|---|---|---|
| Independent | Frederick Holder (elected 1) | 1,400 | 42.8 | +9.6 |
| Independent | George Hingston Lake (elected 2) | 1,017 | 31.0 | +10.6 |
| Independent | Walter Hughes Duncan | 857 | 26.2 | +14.8 |
| Total formal votes | | 1,736 | 98.4 | +0.6 |
| Informal votes | | 29 | 1.6 | −0.6 |
| Turnout | | 1,765 | 66.3 | +12.0 |

=== East Adelaide ===
1893 South Australian colonial election: East Adelaide
| Party | Candidate | Votes | % | ±% |
|---|---|---|---|---|
| Independent | Theodor Scherk (elected 1) | 1,472 | 39.3 | −4.0 |
| United Labor | John McPherson (elected 2) | 1,398 | 37.4 | +37.4 |
| Independent | James Zimri Sellar | 567 | 15.2 | −5.0 |
| Independent | Thomas Hyland Smeaton | 305 | 8.2 | +8.2 |
| Total formal votes | | 2,234 | 98.7 | +0.6 |
| Informal votes | | 28 | 1.3 | −0.6 |
| Turnout | | 2,262 | 68.8 | +42.6 |

=== East Torrens ===
1893 South Australian colonial election: East Torrens
| Party | Candidate | Votes | % | ±% |
|---|---|---|---|---|
| Independent | Thomas Playford (elected 1) | 2,502 | 38.9 | −1.8 |
| United Labor | Frederick Coneybeer (elected 2) | 2,158 | 33.5 | +33.5 |
| National Defence | David Packham | 1,775 | 27.6 | +4.0 |
| Total formal votes | | 3,738 | 98.5 | +0.6 |
| Informal votes | | 57 | 1.5 | −0.6 |
| Turnout | | 3,795 | 65.8 | +14.6 |

=== Encounter Bay ===
1893 South Australian colonial election: Encounter Bay
| Party | Candidate | Votes | % | ±% |
|---|---|---|---|---|
| National Defence | Henry Edward Downer (elected 1) | 409 | 27.8 | +0.7 |
| Independent | John Robert Kelly (elected 2) | 373 | 25.4 | +3.8 |
| Independent | Matthew Wood Green | 308 | 20.9 | +20.9 |
| National Defence | Charles Henry Hussey | 239 | 16.2 | +1.0 |
| Independent | Frederick Abbot Haynes | 126 | 8.5 | +8.5 |
| Independent | Daniel Lewis Taylor | 13 | 0.8 | +0.8 |
| Total formal votes | | 814 | 99.0 | +3.6 |
| Informal votes | | 9 | 1.0 | −3.6 |
| Turnout | | 823 | 73.0 | +2.9 |

=== Flinders ===
1893 South Australian colonial election: Flinders
| Party | Candidate | Votes | % | ±% |
|---|---|---|---|---|
| Independent | John Moule (elected 1) | 650 | 35.2 | +7.4 |
| United Labor | Alexander Poynton (elected 2) | 500 | 27.1 | +27.1 |
| Independent | Paul Frederick Bonnin | 478 | 25.9 | +3.7 |
| Independent | Edward Daniel Swaffer | 88 | 4.8 | −3.5 |
| Independent | John Venning | 83 | 4.5 | +4.5 |
| Independent | Archibald Beviss | 33 | 1.8 | +1.8 |
| Independent | John Bowyer Bull | 16 | 0.9 | +0.9 |
| Total formal votes | | 1,041 | 96.6 | −0.9 |
| Informal votes | | 35 | 3.4 | +0.9 |
| Turnout | | 1,076 | 36.7 | +5.6 |

=== Frome ===
1893 South Australian colonial election: Frome
| Party | Candidate | Votes | % | ±% |
|---|---|---|---|---|
| National Defence | Laurence O'Loughlin (elected 1) | 1,426 | 36.7 | +10.2 |
| National Defence | Clement Giles (elected 2) | 1,073 | 27.6 | +1.6 |
| United Labor | Andrew Dungey | 635 | 16.4 | +16.4 |
| Independent | George Moran | 293 | 7.5 | +7.5 |
| Independent | James Aitcheson | 200 | 5.2 | −4.5 |
| Independent | John Heithersay | 187 | 4.8 | +4.8 |
| Independent | Alexander Dey | 69 | 1.0 | +1.0 |
| Total formal votes | | 2,238 | 98.9 | +0.4 |
| Informal votes | | 25 | 1.1 | −0.4 |
| Turnout | | 2,263 | 57.7 | +9.5 |

=== Gladstone ===
1893 South Australian colonial election: Gladstone
| Party | Candidate | Votes | % | ±% |
|---|---|---|---|---|
| Independent | Alfred Catt (elected 1) | 1,214 | 35.4 | +3.5 |
| National Defence | James Henderson Howe (elected 2) | 1,187 | 34.6 | +0.6 |
| United Labor | Ernest Roberts | 1,027 | 30.0 | +30.0 |
| Total formal votes | | 2,133 | 99.3 | +1.3 |
| Informal votes | | 14 | 0.7 | −1.3 |
| Turnout | | 2,147 | 70.5 | +9.0 |

=== Gumeracha ===
1893 South Australian colonial election: Gumeracha
| Party | Candidate | Votes | % | ±% |
|---|---|---|---|---|
| National Defence | Robert Homburg (elected 1) | 987 | 38.9 | +8.0 |
| National Defence | William Randell (elected 2) | 580 | 22.8 | +22.8 |
| Independent | John Medway Day | 449 | 17.7 | +17.7 |
| Independent | Theodore Hack | 290 | 11.4 | −7.7 |
| Independent | John McEwin | 234 | 9.2 | −8.6 |
| Total formal votes | | 1,364 | 98.9 | −0.9 |
| Informal votes | | 15 | 1.1 | +0.9 |
| Turnout | | 1,379 | 68.8 | +7.1 |

=== Light ===
1893 South Australian colonial election: Light
| Party | Candidate | Votes | % | ±% |
|---|---|---|---|---|
| National Defence | Jenkin Coles (elected 1) | 1,415 | 41.4 | +7.3 |
| National Defence | James Wharton White (elected 2) | 1,025 | 30.0 | +6.9 |
| Independent | Paddy Glynn | 979 | 28.6 | +6.8 |
| Total formal votes | | 1,940 | 99.5 | +0.5 |
| Informal votes | | 9 | 0.5 | −0.5 |
| Turnout | | 1,949 | 73.1 | +9.9 |

=== Mount Barker ===
1893 South Australian colonial election: Mount Barker
| Party | Candidate | Votes | % | ±% |
|---|---|---|---|---|
| Independent | John Cockburn (elected 1) | 1,059 | 42.5 | −5.3 |
| National Defence | Albert Henry Landseer (elected 2) | 927 | 37.2 | +5.2 |
| National Defence | Friedrich Wilhelm Paech | 397 | 15.9 | +15.9 |
| Independent | Charles Henry Matters | 103 | 4.1 | −16.1 |
| Total formal votes | | 1,344 | 97.6 | +0.1 |
| Informal votes | | 33 | 2.4 | −0.1 |
| Turnout | | 1,377 | 75.0 | +10.3 |

=== Newcastle ===
1893 South Australian colonial election: Newcastle
| Party | Candidate | Votes | % | ±% |
|---|---|---|---|---|
| Independent | Richard Foster (elected 1) | 1,115 | 34.0 | +34.0 |
| Independent | Thomas Burgoyne (elected 2) | 1,068 | 32.5 | +2.7 |
| Independent | Joseph Hancock | 823 | 25.1 | +6.3 |
| Independent | William Joseph Crocker | 276 | 8.4 | +7.1 |
| Total formal votes | | 1,948 | 98.8 | ±0.0 |
| Informal votes | | 24 | 1.2 | ±0.0 |
| Turnout | | 1,972 | 57.1 | +16.3 |

=== Noarlunga ===
1893 South Australian colonial election: Noarlunga
| Party | Candidate | Votes | % | ±% |
|---|---|---|---|---|
| Independent | William Blacker (elected 1) | 665 | 38.7 | +38.7 |
| National Defence | Alexander McDonald (elected 2) | 605 | 35.2 | +3.5 |
| Independent | George Berry | 181 | 10.5 | +10.5 |
| Independent | Thomas Atkinson | 127 | 7.4 | −14.1 |
| Independent | Felix De Caux | 110 | 6.4 | +6.4 |
| Independent | Benjamin Ferne Lloyd | 32 | 1.9 | +1.9 |
| Total formal votes | | 928 | 99.1 | +0.4 |
| Informal votes | | 8 | 0.9 | −0.4 |
| Turnout | | 936 | 67.8 | +1.2 |

=== North Adelaide ===
1893 South Australian colonial election: North Adelaide
| Party | Candidate | Votes | % | ±% |
|---|---|---|---|---|
| United Labor | Richard Wood (elected 1) | 1,325 | 35.9 | +35.9 |
| Independent | George Charles Hawker (elected 2) | 1,267 | 34.3 | +2.3 |
| Independent | Lewis Cohen | 1,102 | 29.8 | −9.8 |
| Total formal votes | | 2,326 | 99.0 | +0.4 |
| Informal votes | | 24 | 1.0 | −0.4 |
| Turnout | | 2,350 | 75.4 | +26.2 |

=== Northern Territory ===
1893 South Australian colonial election: Northern Territory
| Party | Candidate | Votes | % | ±% |
|---|---|---|---|---|
| Independent | Vaiben Louis Solomon (elected 1) | 272 | 44.3 | −9.3 |
| Independent | Walter Griffiths (elected 2) | 188 | 30.6 | +30.6 |
| Independent | RM Stow | 143 | 23.3 | +23.3 |
| Independent | Thomas Coward | 11 | 1.8 | +1.8 |
| Total formal votes | | 343 | 98.3 | −1.0 |
| Informal votes | | 6 | 1.7 | +1.0 |
| Turnout | | 349 | 43.8 | +3.0 |

=== Onkaparinga ===
1893 South Australian colonial election: Onkaparinga
| Party | Candidate | Votes | % | ±% |
|---|---|---|---|---|
| National Defence | Robert Caldwell (elected 1) | 874 | 32.9 | +10.7 |
| Independent | Frank Johnson (elected 2) | 696 | 26.2 | +5.2 |
| Independent | Caleb George Gurr | 578 | 21.7 | +8.9 |
| Independent | William Ball Merchant | 511 | 19.2 | −1.2 |
| Total formal votes | | 1,482 | 98.9 | +1.8 |
| Informal votes | | 16 | 1.1 | −1.8 |
| Turnout | | 1,498 | 74.5 | +10.5 |

=== Port Adelaide ===
1893 South Australian colonial election: Port Adelaide
| Party | Candidate | Votes | % | ±% |
|---|---|---|---|---|
| United Labor | William Archibald (elected 1) | 1,781 | 29.5 | +29.5 |
| United Labor | Ivor MacGillivray (elected 2) | 1,722 | 28.5 | +28.5 |
| National Defence | Charles Tucker | 1,049 | 17.3 | +17.3 |
| Independent | James Sinclair | 995 | 16.5 | +0.3 |
| Independent | Alfred Edwin Sawtell | 343 | 5.7 | +0.6 |
| Independent | George Feltham Hopkins | 157 | 2.6 | −15.7 |
| Total formal votes | | 3,173 | 98.6 | +0.9 |
| Informal votes | | 44 | 1.4 | −0.9 |
| Turnout | | 3,217 | 71.5 | +34.0 |

=== Stanley ===
1893 South Australian colonial election: Stanley
| Party | Candidate | Votes | % | ±% |
|---|---|---|---|---|
| Independent | Peter Paul Gillen (elected 1) | 1,261 | 43.1 | +4.7 |
| National Defence | Edward William Hawker (elected 2) | 633 | 21.6 | +21.6 |
| Independent | John Miller | 619 | 21.2 | −5.6 |
| Independent | James Murrie | 413 | 14.1 | +14.1 |
| Total formal votes | | 1,549 | 98.9 | +0.4 |
| Informal votes | | 18 | 1.1 | −0.4 |
| Turnout | | 1,567 | 66.9 | −0.2 |

=== Sturt ===
1893 South Australian colonial election: Sturt
| Party | Candidate | Votes | % | ±% |
|---|---|---|---|---|
| United Labor | Thomas Price (elected 1) | 1,434 | 25.3 | +25.3 |
| Independent | John Jenkins (elected 2) | 1,433 | 25.3 | −11.1 |
| United Labor | Henry Adams | 1,412 | 24.9 | 24.9 |
| Independent | Henry Dixon Gell | 1,050 | 18.5 | −5.2 |
| Independent | Friend Henry Edwards | 289 | 5.1 | +5.1 |
| Independent | Charles Reid | 48 | 0.8 | +0.8 |
| Total formal votes | | 2,997 | 98.9 | +0.2 |
| Informal votes | | 34 | 1.1 | −0.2 |
| Turnout | | 3,031 | 66.5 | +13.2 |

=== Victoria ===
1893 South Australian colonial election: Victoria
| Party | Candidate | Votes | % | ±% |
|---|---|---|---|---|
| Independent | James Cock (elected 1) | 1,053 | 29.6 | +4.9 |
| National Defence | George Riddoch (elected 2) | 835 | 23.5 | +2.4 |
| Independent | John James Osman | 830 | 23.4 | −8.6 |
| National Defence | James Pick | 629 | 17.7 | −4.4 |
| Independent | Francis Davison | 207 | 5.8 | +5.8 |
| Total formal votes | | 1,910 | 98.8 | +0.3 |
| Informal votes | | 24 | 1.2 | −0.3 |
| Turnout | | 1,934 | 81.9 | +9.8 |

=== Wallaroo ===
1893 South Australian colonial election: Wallaroo
| Party | Candidate | Votes | % | ±% |
|---|---|---|---|---|
| Independent | Henry Allerdale Grainger (elected 1) | 1,265 | 35.4 | +12.8 |
| United Labor | Richard Hooper (elected 2) | 1,130 | 31.6 | +31.6 |
| Independent | Peter Allen | 636 | 17.8 | +17.8 |
| United Labor | James Malcolm | 471 | 13.2 | +6.6 |
| Independent | Benjamin Crosby | 75 | 2.1 | +0.8 |
| Total formal votes | | 2,073 | 98.0 | −0.4 |
| Informal votes | | 43 | 2.0 | +0.4 |
| Turnout | | 2,116 | 66.6 | +13.6 |

=== West Adelaide ===
1893 South Australian colonial election: West Adelaide
| Party | Candidate | Votes | % | ±% |
|---|---|---|---|---|
| United Labor | Lee Batchelor (elected 1) | 1,543 | 40.8 | +40.8 |
| Independent | Charles Kingston (elected 2) | 1,513 | 40.0 | +10.7 |
| Independent | Lawrence Grayson | 686 | 18.1 | −6.9 |
| Independent | Charles Beer | 39 | 1.0 | +1.0 |
| Total formal votes | | 2,226 | 98.5 | −0.2 |
| Informal votes | | 35 | 1.5 | +0.2 |
| Turnout | | 2,261 | 71.5 | +26.8 |

=== West Torrens ===
1893 South Australian colonial election: West Torrens
| Party | Candidate | Votes | % | ±% |
|---|---|---|---|---|
| Independent | Thomas Henry Brooker (elected 1) | 2,217 | 46.0 | +23.8 |
| United Labor | Frank Hourigan (elected 2) | 1,421 | 29.5 | +29.5 |
| Independent | Benjamin Gould | 1,186 | 24.6 | −3.8 |
| Total formal votes | | 2,676 | 98.5 | −0.1 |
| Informal votes | | 41 | 1.5 | +0.1 |
| Turnout | | 2,717 | 73.7 | +15.4 |

=== Wooroora ===
1893 South Australian colonial election: Wooroora
| Party | Candidate | Votes | % | ±% |
|---|---|---|---|---|
| National Defence | John William Castine (elected 1) | 614 | 24.4 | −5.6 |
| National Defence | James McLachlan (elected 2) | 539 | 21.4 | +8.0 |
| Independent | James Joseph Johnson | 448 | 17.8 | +11.4 |
| National Defence | Robert Kelly | 295 | 11.7 | −6.1 |
| Independent | David Virgo | 209 | 8.3 | +8.3 |
| United Labor | Frederick Richard Adams | 181 | 7.2 | +5.8 |
| Independent | David Smith | 127 | 5.1 | +5.1 |
| Independent | James Kelly | 101 | 4.0 | +4.0 |
| Total formal votes | | 1,403 | 98.9 | ±0.0 |
| Informal votes | | 15 | 1.1 | ±0.0 |
| Turnout | | 1,418 | 74.2 | −2.3 |

=== Yatala ===
1893 South Australian colonial election: Yatala
| Party | Candidate | Votes | % | ±% |
|---|---|---|---|---|
| Independent | Richard Butler (elected 1) | 883 | 40.5 | +30.3 |
| National Defence | William Gilbert (elected 2) | 618 | 28.3 | −0.4 |
| Independent | James Doyle | 333 | 15.3 | +3.1 |
| National Defence | Charles Willcox | 306 | 14.0 | +14.0 |
| Independent | Johann Sudholz | 40 | 1.8 | +1.8 |
| Total formal votes | | 1,189 | 98.9 | +0.7 |
| Informal votes | | 13 | 1.1 | −0.7 |
| Turnout | | 1,202 | 72.5 | +6.0 |

=== Yorke Peninsula ===
1893 South Australian colonial election: Yorke Peninsula
| Party | Candidate | Votes | % | ±% |
|---|---|---|---|---|
| Independent | Arthur Short (elected 1) | 540 | 23.6 | +14.9 |
| Independent | Harry Bartlett (elected 2) | 459 | 20.1 | +0.9 |
| Independent | Henry Lamshed | 401 | 17.5 | +4.9 |
| National Defence | Ben Rounsevell | 369 | 16.1 | +16.1 |
| Independent | Alexander James Anderson | 206 | 9.0 | +9.0 |
| Independent | William Verco Cornish | 142 | 6.2 | +6.2 |
| Independent | William Henry Quartly | 106 | 4.6 | +4.6 |
| Independent | Thomas Smith | 38 | 1.7 | +1.7 |
| Independent | William John O'Brien | 26 | 1.1 | +1.1 |
| Total formal votes | | 1,218 | 98.6 | −1.2 |
| Informal votes | | 17 | 1.4 | +1.2 |
| Turnout | | 1,235 | 66.0 | +10.0 |
