= Members of the South Australian House of Assembly, 1890–1893 =

This is a list of members of the South Australian House of Assembly from 1890 to 1893, as elected at the 1890 colonial election:

Name	Party	Electorate	Term of office
George Ash		Albert	1890–1897
Harry Bartlett		Yorke Peninsula	1887–1896
David Bews ^{[3]}		Wallaroo	1885–1891
William Blacker ^{[6]}		Noarlunga	1892–1913
Hon John Cox Bray ^{[5]}		East Adelaide	1871–1892
Thomas Henry Brooker		West Torrens	1890–1905
Thomas Burgoyne		Newcastle	1884–1915
Richard Butler ^{[1]}		Yatala	1890–1924
Robert Caldwell		Onkaparinga	1884–1902
Hon Alfred Catt		Gladstone	1881–1906
James Cock		Victoria	1890–1899
John Cockburn		Mount Barker	1884–1898
Lewis Cohen		North Adelaide	1887–1893, 1902–1906
Hon Jenkin Coles		Light	1875–1878, 1881–1911
James Cowan ^{[1]}		Yatala	1890
Charles Dashwood ^{[6]}		Noarlunga	1887–1892
Henry Edward Downer		Encounter Bay	1881–1896
Hon Sir John Downer		Barossa	1878–1901
William Gilbert		Yatala	1881–1906
Clement Giles		Frome	1887–1902
Peter Paul Gillen		Stanley	1889–1896
Benjamin Gould		West Torrens	1887–1893
Henry Allerdale Grainger		Wallaroo	1884–1885, 1890–1901
Lawrence Grayson		West Adelaide	1887–1893
Theodore Hack		Gumeracha	1890–1893
James Hague		Barossa	1890–1902
Joseph Hancock		Newcastle	1890–1893
Andrew Dods Handyside		Albert	1885–1904
Hon George Charles Hawker		North Adelaide	1858–1865, 1875–1883, 1884–1895
Frederick Holder		Burra	1887–1901
Robert Homburg		Gumeracha	1884–1905
Richard Hooper ^{[3]}	Labor	Wallaroo	1891–1902
George Feltham Hopkins		Port Adelaide	1875–1893, 1887–1893
William Horn		Flinders	1887–1893
James Henderson Howe		Gladstone	1881–1896
John Jenkins		Sturt	1887–1905
Frank Johnson		Onkaparinga	1884–1896
Hugh Craine Kelly ^{[2]}		Wooroora	1890–1891
John Robert Kelly		Encounter Bay	1890–1896
Robert Kelly ^{[2]}		Wooroora	1891–1893
Hon Charles Kingston		West Adelaide	1881–1900
George Hingston Lake		Burra	1890–1896
Henry Lamshed		Yorke Peninsula	1890–1893
Albert Henry Landseer		Mount Barker	1875–1899
Alexander McDonald		Noarlunga	1887–1915
John McPherson ^{[5]}	Labor	East Adelaide	1892–1897
John Miller		Stanley	1884–1885, 1890–1893, 1896–1902
John Moule		Flinders	1884–1896
Laurence O'Loughlin		Frome	1890–1918
John James Osman		Victoria	1888–1893
Hon John Langdon Parsons		Northern Territory	1878–1884, 1890–1893
Hon Thomas Playford ^{[1]}		East Torrens	1868–1871, 1875–1894, 1899–1901
Hon Ben Rounsevell		Port Adelaide	1875–1893, 1899–1906
Theodor Scherk		East Adelaide	1886–1905
Sir Edwin Thomas Smith		East Torrens	1871–1877, 1878–1893
Vaiben Louis Solomon ^{[4]}		Northern Territory	1890–1901, 1905–1908
William Frederick Stock		Sturt	1887–1893
James Wharton White		Light	1890–1896

^{1} Yatala MHA James Cowan was killed in an accident on 21 July 1890, only two months after his election. Richard Butler won the resulting by-election on 13 August.
^{2} Wooroora MHA Hugh Craine Kelly died on 13 January 1891. Robert Kelly won the resulting by-election on 25 February..
^{3} Wallaroo MHA David Bews died on 24 February 1891. Independent Labor candidate Richard Hooper won the resulting by-election on 23 May.
^{4} Northern Territory MHA Vaiben Louis Solomon resigned on 5 March 1891. He was re-elected in the resulting by-election on 23 and 25 May.
^{5} East Adelaide MHA John Cox Bray resigned on 6 January 1892. Labor candidate John McPherson won the resulting by-election on 23 January.
^{6} Noarlunga MHA Charles Dashwood resigned on 24 February 1892. William Blacker won the resulting by-election on 26 March.
