= Members of the South Australian House of Assembly, 1893–1896 =

This is a list of members of the South Australian House of Assembly from 1893 to 1896, as elected at the 1893 colonial election:

Name	Party	Electorate	Term of office
William Archibald	Labor	Port Adelaide	1893–1910
George Ash	NDL	Albert	1890–1897
Harry Bartlett		Yorke Peninsula	1887–1896
Lee Batchelor	Labor	West Adelaide	1893–1901
William Blacker		Noarlunga	1892–1913
Thomas Henry Brooker		West Torrens	1890–1905
Thomas Burgoyne		Newcastle	1884–1915
Richard Butler		Yatala	1890–1924
Robert Caldwell	NDL	Onkaparinga	1884–1902
John William Castine	NDL	Wooroora	1884–1902
Hon Alfred Catt		Gladstone	1881–1906
James Cock		Victoria	1890–1899
Hon John Cockburn		Mount Barker	1884–1898
Hon Sir Jenkin Coles	NDL	Light	1875–1878, 1881–1911
Frederick Coneybeer	Labor	East Torrens	1893–1921, 1924–1930
Andrew Dods Handyside	NDL	Albert	1885–1904
Henry Edward Downer	NDL	Encounter Bay	1881–1896
Hon Sir John Downer	NDL	Barossa	1878–1901
Richard Foster		Newcastle	1893–1906
William Gilbert	NDL	Yatala	1881–1906
Clement Giles	NDL	Frome	1887–1902
Peter Paul Gillen		Stanley	1889–1896
Paddy Glynn ^{[2]}	NDL	North Adelaide	1887–1890, 1895–1896, 1897–1901
Henry Allerdale Grainger		Wallaroo	1884–1885, 1890–1901
Walter Griffiths		Northern Territory	1893–1900
James Hague	NDL	Barossa	1890–1902
Edward William Hawker	NDL	Stanley	1884–1889, 1893–1886
Hon George Charles Hawker ^{[2]}		North Adelaide	1858–1865, 1875–1883, 1884–1895
Frederick Holder		Burra	1887–1901
Robert Homburg	NDL	Gumeracha	1884–1905
Richard Hooper	Labor	Wallaroo	1891–1902
Frank Hourigan	Labor	West Torrens	1893–1901
Hon James Henderson Howe	NDL	Gladstone	1881–1896
John Jenkins		Sturt	1887–1905
Frank Johnson		Onkaparinga	1884–1896
John Robert Kelly		Encounter Bay	1890–1896
Hon Charles Kingston		West Adelaide	1881–1900
George Hingston Lake		Burra	1890–1896
Albert Henry Landseer	NDL	Mount Barker	1875–1899
Ivor MacGillivray	Labor	Port Adelaide	1893–1918
Alexander McDonald	NDL	Noarlunga	1887–1915
James McLachlan Sr.	NDL	Wooroora	1893–1902
John McPherson	Labor	East Adelaide	1892–1897
John Moule		Flinders	1884–1896
Laurence O'Loughlin	NDL	Frome	1890–1918
David Packham ^{[1]}	NDL	East Torrens	1894–1896
Hon Thomas Playford ^{[1]}		East Torrens	1868–1871, 1875–1894, 1899–1901
Alexander Poynton	Labor	Flinders	1893–1901
Thomas Price	Labor	Sturt	1893–1909
William Randell	NDL	Gumeracha	1893–1896, 1896–1899
George Riddoch	NDL	Victoria	1893–1896
Theodor Scherk		East Adelaide	1886–1905
Arthur Short		Yorke Peninsula	1893–1896
Vaiben Louis Solomon		Northern Territory	1890–1901, 1905–1908
James Wharton White	NDL	Light	1890–1896
Richard Wood	Labor	North Adelaide	1893–1902

^{1} East Torrens MHA Thomas Playford resigned on 17 April 1894. David Packham won the resulting by-election on 19 May.
^{2} North Adelaide MHA George Charles Hawker died on 21 May 1895. Paddy Glynn won the resulting by-election on 8 June.
