= Members of the South Australian House of Assembly, 1896–1899 =

This is a list of members of the South Australian House of Assembly from 1896 to 1899, as elected at the 1896 colonial election:

Name	Party	Electorate	Term of office
William Archibald	Labor	Port Adelaide	1893–1910
George Ash ^{[4]}	NDL	Albert	1890–1897
Lee Batchelor	Labor	West Adelaide	1893–1901
William Blacker		Noarlunga	1892–1913
Thomas Henry Brooker		West Torrens	1890–1905
Thomas Burgoyne		Newcastle	1884–1915
Richard Butler		Yatala	1890–1924
Robert Caldwell	NDL	Onkaparinga	1884–1902
William Carpenter	Labor	Encounter Bay	1896–1902
John William Castine	NDL	Wooroora	1884–1902
Hon Alfred Catt		Gladstone	1881–1906
James Cock		Victoria	1890–1899
Hon John Cockburn ^{[7]}		Mount Barker	1884–1898
Frederick Coneybeer	Labor	East Torrens	1893–1921, 1924–1930
Hon Sir Jenkin Coles	NDL	Light	1875–1878, 1881–1911
William Copley	NDL	Yorke Peninsula	1884–1887, 1896–1902
William Patrick Cummins ^{[2]}		Stanley	1896–1907
John Darling, junior	NDL	East Torrens	1896–1905
Hon Sir John Downer	NDL	Barossa	1878–1901
Charles Dumas ^{[7]}	NDL	Mount Barker	1898–1902
Walter Hughes Duncan	NDL	Onkaparinga	1896–1906
Richard Foster		Newcastle	1893–1906
William Gilbert	NDL	Yatala	1881–1906
Paddy Glynn ^{[3]}	NDL	North Adelaide	1887–1890, 1895–1896, 1897–1901
Charles Rufus Goode	NDL	Burra	1896–1899
Clement Giles	NDL	Frome	1887–1902
Peter Paul Gillen ^{[2]}		Stanley	1889–1896
Henry Allerdale Grainger		Wallaroo	1884–1885, 1890–1901
Walter Griffiths		Northern Territory	1893–1900
James Hague	NDL	Barossa	1890–1902
Andrew Dods Handyside	NDL	Albert	1885–1904
Arthur Harrold ^{[3]}	NDL	North Adelaide	1896–1897
Frederick Holder		Burra	1887–1901
Robert Homburg	NDL	Gumeracha	1884–1905
Richard Hooper	Labor	Wallaroo	1891–1902
Frank Hourigan	Labor	West Torrens	1893–1901
James Hutchison ^{[6]}	Labor	East Adelaide	1898–1902
John Jenkins		Sturt	1887–1905
Hon Charles Kingston		West Adelaide	1881–1900
Albert Henry Landseer		Mount Barker	1875–1899
Ivor MacGillivray	Labor	Port Adelaide	1893–1918
Alexander McDonald	NDL	Noarlunga	1887–1915
James McLachlan, senior	NDL	Wooroora	1893–1902
John McPherson ^{[6]}	Labor	East Adelaide	1892–1897
John Miller		Stanley	1884–1885, 1890–1893, 1896–1902
David Moody		Light	1878–1881, 1884–1887, 1896–1899
James Toulmin Morris		Victoria	1896–1902
William Tennant Mortlock		Flinders	1896–1899, 1901–1902
Laurence O'Loughlin		Frome	1890–1918
King O'Malley		Encounter Bay	1896–1899
Archibald Peake ^{[4]}		Albert	1897–1915, 1915–1920
Alexander Poynton	Labor	Flinders	1893–1901
Thomas Price	Labor	Sturt	1893–1909
William Richard Randell ^{[1]}		Gumeracha	1893–1896, 1896–1899
Ernest Roberts	Labor	Gladstone	1896–1902, 1905–1908
Theodor Scherk		East Adelaide	1886–1905
John Shannon		Yorke Peninsula	1896–1905
Vaiben Louis Solomon		Northern Territory	1890–1901, 1905–1908
Charles Willcox ^{[1]}	NDL	Gumeracha	1896
Richard Wood	Labor/Ind. ^{[5]}	North Adelaide	1893–1902

^{1} Gumeracha NDL MHA Charles Willcox resigned on 18 June 1896 following concerns about his status as a government contractor. He was declared by the Court of Disputed Returns to have been incapable of being elected on 19 June. William Richard Randell, who Willcox had defeated at the 1896 election, won the resulting by-election on 10 July.
^{2} Stanley MHA Peter Paul Gillen died on 22 September 1896. William Patrick Cummins won the resulting by-election on 17 October.
^{3} North Adelaide NDL MHA Arthur Harrold resigned on 2 April 1897. NDL candidate Paddy Glynn won the resulting by-election on 22 May.
^{4} Albert NDL MHA George Ash died on 23 February 1897. Archibald Peake won the resulting by-election on 22 May, but was unseated by the Court of Disputed Returns on 3 July following allegations of electoral irregularities in the booth at Holder. Peake won a second by-election on 31 July.
^{5} North Adelaide MHA Richard Wood was expelled from the Labor Party in November 1897 and served out his term as an independent.
^{6} East Adelaide Labor MHA John McPherson died on 13 December 1897. Labor candidate James Hutchison won the resulting by-election on 22 January 1898.
^{7} Mount Barker MHA John Cockburn resigned on 20 April 1898. Charles Dumas won the resulting by-election on 14 May.
