= Joseph Glynn =

Joseph Glynn may refer to:

- Joseph Glynn (politician)
- Joseph Glynn (engineer)
