= James Shakespeare =

James Shakespeare (c. 1840 – 4 October 1912) was an organist in the early days of the colony of South Australia.

== History ==
Shakespeare was born in Birmingham, England, the oldest child and elder son of Joseph Shakespeare, an engineer who claimed descent from the family of the "Bard of Avon".

It is possible that the family emigrated to Australia aboard Emily in August 1849, though only one Shakespeare appears among the arrivals, listed as "Sarah A. Shakespeare". Joseph unsuccessfully applied for a licence for his residential "Railway Hotel" roughly opposite the Adelaide Railway Station, and was subsequently listed as a "temperance hotel".

James was educated at Christ Church School, in North Adelaide, whose headmaster was James Bath. Shakespeare then served as an assistant to Mr. Bath, who later became Secretary to the Minister of Education, then taught for a few years at J. L. Young's Adelaide Educational Institution.

He and his brother William clearly had a substantial musical education, perhaps largely from their father, who had constructed a pipe organ for his own home use. The boys were frequently called on to preside at the piano at various functions of organizations such as the Freeman Street and North Adelaide Young Men's Societies, part of a network of similarly named groups attached to Protestant churches. William was also known as an actor and elocutionist of some ability.

He decided on the life of a professional musician, and around 1862 was appointed organist (or rather harmoniumist) at the Freeman Street (now part of Gawler Place) Congregational Church, and was on 12 April 1867 the first organist and choirmaster of its successor the Stow Memorial Church, Flinders Street, and would serve the two churches for a total of 45 years.

So primitive were the ideas of the people in regard to the musical service that they would not tolerate the introduction of chants and, psalms. The "fathers" of the church were very hostile to the pipe organ, and considered it uncalled for and "Popish." When I introduced the chanting of a hymn many of the congregation would immediately sit down. In fact, a meeting was held deprecating voluntary playing or music after the service. The minister asked if I would simply play "I will arise and go to my father,' and no concluding voluntary. I did this for a time, but afterwards said I would rather go than submit to be so hampered. I determined to play a simple melody before and after the service, but it had to be of a hymnal character lest it should shock the good folk. An anthem was never heard except on festive occasions; and then the very people who objected most strongly to its employment in the regular service were delighted with it, and we were asked to sing it at tea and public meetings. Mr. C. B. Symes, when pastor, determined that he would not only have chanting but the Te Deum, but this was fatal to his popularity. Some of the church members reduced their subscriptions by 50 per cent., but I little knew how much the pastor had suffered in trying to improve the music until Mr. Symes told me himself afterwards. When the late Rev. W. Roby Fletcher took the pulpit there was an accumulated debt of £200. caused by the reduced subscriptions. A committee was formed to decide how this should be wiped off. It was suggested that the organ should be closed, the organist dismissed, and the harmonium reinstated; and that I should be asked to play for £30 per annum. I replied that if the church was in difficulties I would play for nothing; but that I would not disgrace my profession by playing for £30 a year. As I had offered to play for nothing, they could not very well send me away, and I remained.

From 1867 or earlier he taught piano and harmonium from premises in Franklin Street, then at his home "Stratford Villa", Pulteney Street

He was organist for the Adelaide Philharmonic Society from its foundation in April 1869 to 1872, to be replaced by W. R. Pybus.

In 1871 Shakespeare produced Bellini's opera Norma using amateur performers, on three consecutive evenings 10–12 April at White's Assembly Rooms to considerable acclaim, and 21–23 and 26 November in the following year, also at White's, the English opera Maritana, with Robert T. Gowenlock notable as Don Caesar de Bazan.

When Shakespeare was inducted into Freemasonry he was appointed the organist of his lodge, and was later elected organist to the Grand Lodge, appointments he retained until his last years. He composed a musical service of Masonic Ritual, which was published in book form in London. Shakespeare was also an artist in oil painting. For many years he conducted the young men's Bible class at Stow Church.

On retiring as organist with Stow Memorial Church in December 1907, Shakespeare was presented with an address and a purse of sovereigns, a traditional token of appreciation by church congregations.

After nine months' illness the death, occurred from paralysis on Friday morning, at Miss Hill's Private Hospital, of Mr. James Shakespeare. . For many years Mr. Shakespeare resided at Stratford Villa, in-Pulteney street. The house was named after the birthplace of the great bard, from whom Mr. Shakespeare claimed descent. Here he conducted a bachelors' home, and many of his old associates, who still live in Adelaide, will share in the regret at his death.

== Family ==
Joseph Shakespeare (c. 1808 – 18 March 1888) was married to Sophia Shakespeare, née Lewis, (c. 1818 – 15 May 1875), perhaps his second wife when they emigrated. He married again to Emma Sutherland (c. 1820 – 25 November 1906) on 17 May 1882. They lived at the Temperance Hotel, North Terrace then "Seaview Villa", Seaview Road, Henley Beach. Joseph's children included:

- James Shakespeare (c. 1840 – 4 October 1912) never married, no known children.
- Mary Ann Shakespeare (c. 1841 – November 1917) married Lawrence Grayson MP (1839–1916) on 3 December 1863
- William "Bill" Shakespeare (4 June 1843 – 4 February 1930) married Julia Ann Martin ( – 4 October 1915) on 22 December 1864. He married again, to Elsie Grimmond Bruce ( –1962) in 1917. He was the first S.A. Railways apprentice before being appointed City Inspector and Inspector of Weights and Measures. He was secretary of the South Australian Sunday School Union for many years. He was a life member of the S.P.C.A. and leading light of the Trinity Church Literary Society, Adelaide Garrick Club and other organizations. Mrs Shakespeare managed Shakespeare's temperance hotel on North Terrace nearly opposite the railway station.
- Priscilla Shakespeare (c. 1846 – 23 February 1926) married Henry Thomas Davis (c. 1841 – 23 August 1878) in 1868. Priscilla was prima donna in Norma.
- Jane Shakespeare (15 January 1849 – 21 May 1928) married Rev. William Henry Newbould ( – 1909) on 23 December 1873. He was a longtime Congregational minister at Truro.
- Sophia Shakespeare (c. 1851 – 20 September 1927) married Clement James Holder (1852–1899) on 6 March 1877. He was a brother of Frederick William Holder
- Susannah "Susie" Shakespeare ( – 31 July 1936) married (Richard) William John Leicester ( – 28 September 1926) on 16 March 1881. William was involved with Adelaide Milling Company and the first secretary of Port Adelaide Football Club.

George Shakespeare, an organist and music teacher of Mount Gambier, South Australia, also with origins in Birmingham, brother of William Shakespeare FRAM. and another claimed descendant of the Bard, appears not to be closely related.
