= Lee Batchelor =

Australian politician (1865–1911)

The Honourable Lee Batchelor
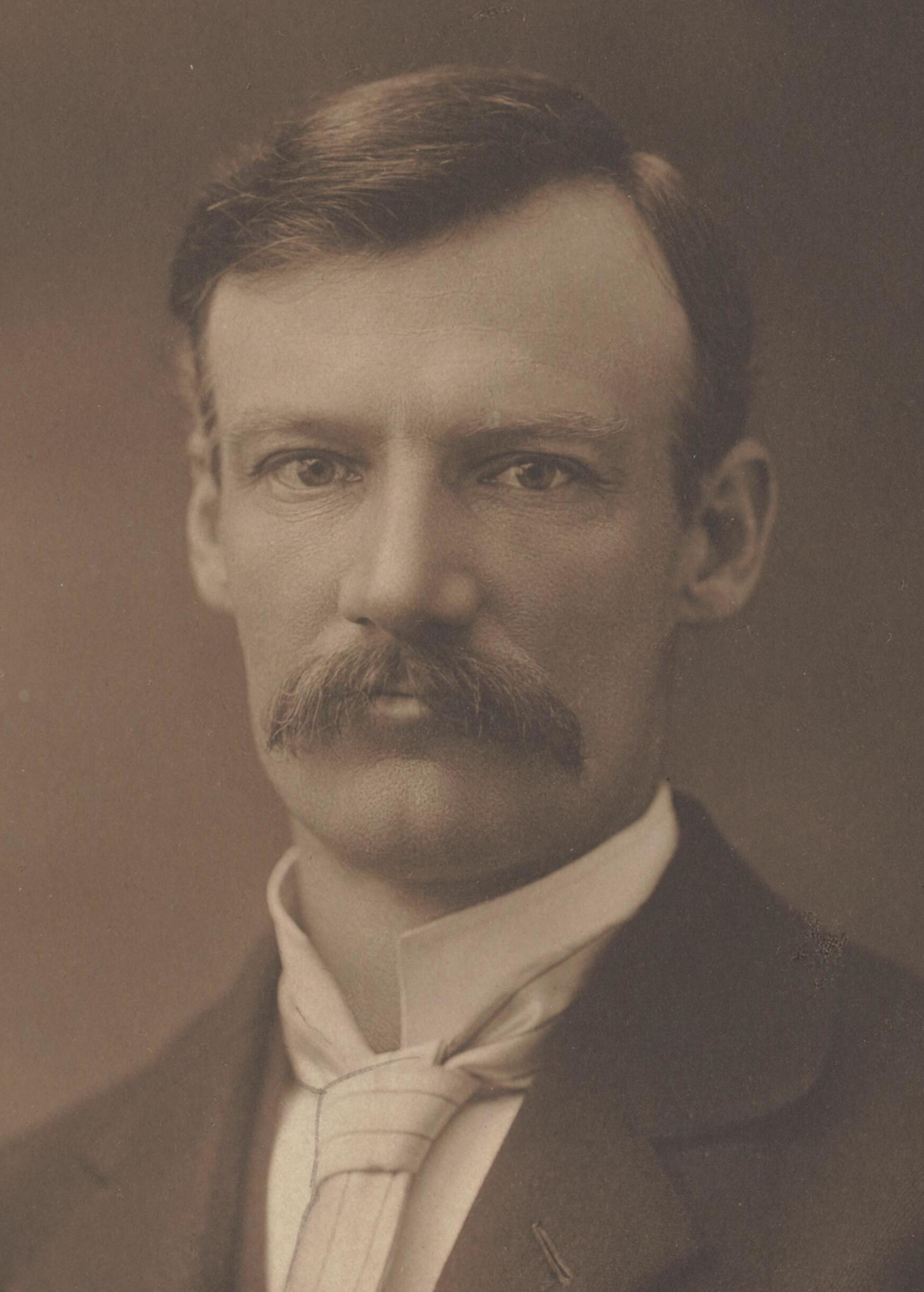

Minister for External Affairs
- In office 29 April 1910 – 8 October 1911
- Prime Minister: Andrew Fisher
- Preceded by: Littleton Groom
- Succeeded by: Josiah Thomas
- In office 13 November 1908 – 2 June 1909
- Prime Minister: Andrew Fisher
- Preceded by: Alfred Deakin
- Succeeded by: Littleton Groom

Minister for Home Affairs
- In office 27 April 1904 – 17 August 1904
- Prime Minister: Chris Watson
- Preceded by: John Forrest
- Succeeded by: Dugald Thomson

Leader of the United Labor Party
- In office 13 December 1897 – 12 December 1899
- Preceded by: John McPherson
- Succeeded by: Thomas Price

Member of the Australian Parliament for Boothby
- In office 16 December 1903 – 8 October 1911
- Preceded by: New seat
- Succeeded by: David Gordon

Member of the Australian Parliament for South Australia
- In office 30 March 1901 – 16 December 1903 Serving with Langdon Bonython, Paddy Glynn, Frederick Holder, Charles Kingston, Alexander Poynton, Vaiben Louis Solomon
- Preceded by: New seat
- Succeeded by: Seat abolished

Leader of the United Labor Party
- In office 4 April 1898 – 12 December 1899
- Preceded by: John McPherson
- Succeeded by: Tom Price

Personal details
- Born: Egerton Lee Batchelor; 10 April 1865 Adelaide, South Australia
- Died: 8 October 1911 (aged 46) Mount Donna Buang, Victoria, Australia
- Party: Labor
- Occupation: Trade unionist

Egerton Lee Batchelor (10 April 1865 – 8 October 1911) was an Australian politician and trade unionist. He was a pioneer of the Australian Labor Party (ALP) in South Australia, which at the time was known as the United Labor Party (ULP). He was a member of the South Australian House of Assembly (1893–1901), leading the ULP from 1898 until his resignation in 1899 to accept a ministerial post in a non-Labor government, with the party's approval. Batchelor entered federal politics in 1901 and held cabinet posts in the first three ALP governments. He was Minister for Home Affairs (1904) under Chris Watson, and then served two terms as Minister for External Affairs (1908–1909, 1910–1911) under Andrew Fisher. He suffered a fatal heart attack at the age of 46 while climbing Mount Donna Buang.

== Early life ==
Egerton Lee Batchelor was born in Adelaide, South Australia on 10 April 1865. His parents Capel Baines and Elizabeth Batchelor were named in his birth record and they are assumed to have had a de facto marriage. They separated before 1876, and he and his two brothers were raised by their mother. Batchelor was educated at the North Adelaide Model School and worked there as a pupil-teacher when he was 12. He also worked at the North Adelaide Church of Christ secondary school but became an apprentice engine-fitter in the government engineering plant in the Adelaide suburb of Islington at 17.

== Trade union career ==
Batchelor soon became active in the labour movement and joined the Amalgamated Society of Engineers (Adelaide) in 1882 and was its president four times between 1889 and 1898. He was also president of the Railway Service Mutual Association. He was elected treasurer of the Trades and Labor Council in 1892 and secretary in 1893. In 1890 he married Rosina Mooney. In 1891, Batchelor was a prominent founding member of the United Labor Party. He was the ULP secretary from 1892 to 1896 and was president in 1898.

== Colonial politics ==
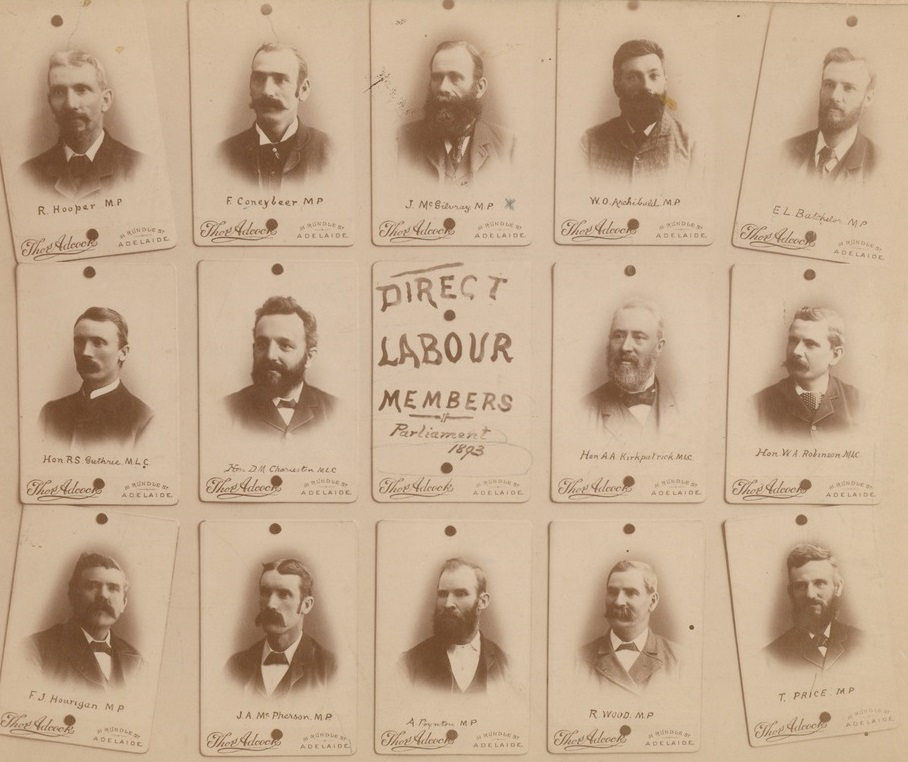
ULP parliamentarians following the 1893 colonial election.

Batchelor was nominated for election to the South Australian House of Assembly on behalf of the ULP in 1893. He gained widespread support from the electorate, and was elected at the top of the poll, becoming one of ten of the first Labor Members of Parliament in South Australia, after John McPherson, the first ULP leader, was elected to East Adelaide in a 1892 by-election. Batchelor also defeated a sitting minister in his seat, and outpolled Charles Kingston, a later Premier of South Australia. When McPherson died in 1897, Batchelor became Labor leader, with the party continuing to support the Kingston liberal government. Thomas Price succeeded Batchelor as Labor leader after the 1899 election (and went on to form the world's first stable Labor government, after the 1905 election). John Verran led Labor to form the state's first of many majority governments at the 1910 election.

Following the fall of the Kingston ministry in December 1899 and the brief premiership of Vaiben Louis Solomon, Batchelor was invited to join Frederick Holder's government as the Minister for Education and Agriculture. As the Minister, Batchelor legislated for a new teacher training scheme coupled with university education. Although the Labor Party pledge of 1899 refused the right of members to join a non-Labor administration, caucus released Batchelor from this constraint: Holder's was essentially the old Kingston ministry with which Labor had associated closely. Batchelor resigned from caucus and from the leadership and became the first Labor member in Australia to join a non-Labor ministry, with the party's unanimous approval.

== Federal politics ==
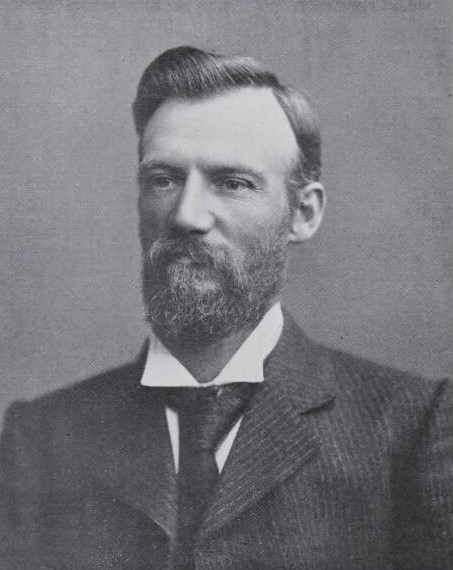
Batchelor, c. 1901

He retired from the South Australian parliament in 1901 and stood for election to the Parliament of Australia in the first Australian election. Batchelor, along with Holder, was elected to the Australian House of Representatives in the single statewide Division of South Australia. Batchelor was the only Labor member of the seven MPs. Labor candidate Thomas Price finished eighth. After South Australia was divided into electoral divisions for the 1903 election to which Batchelor was assigned the Division of Hindmarsh. Batchelor however unselfishly gave up this seat for one of his state MPs, instead deciding to contest the Division of Boothby against former Premier Vaiben Solomon. The voters of Boothby rewarded this selflessness with his election.

In 1904, Batchelor was the Minister for Home Affairs in the government of Chris Watson. He was a "certain inclusion" in Watson's ministry, and along with Billy Hughes had been counselled Watson in selecting the remainder of the Watson ministry. One of his main responsibilities in the short-lived ministry was for the passage of the Seat of Government Act as to the founding of the new national capital. He was nominated in the leadership contest when Watson retired as inaugural Labor leader in 1907 but declined to stand.

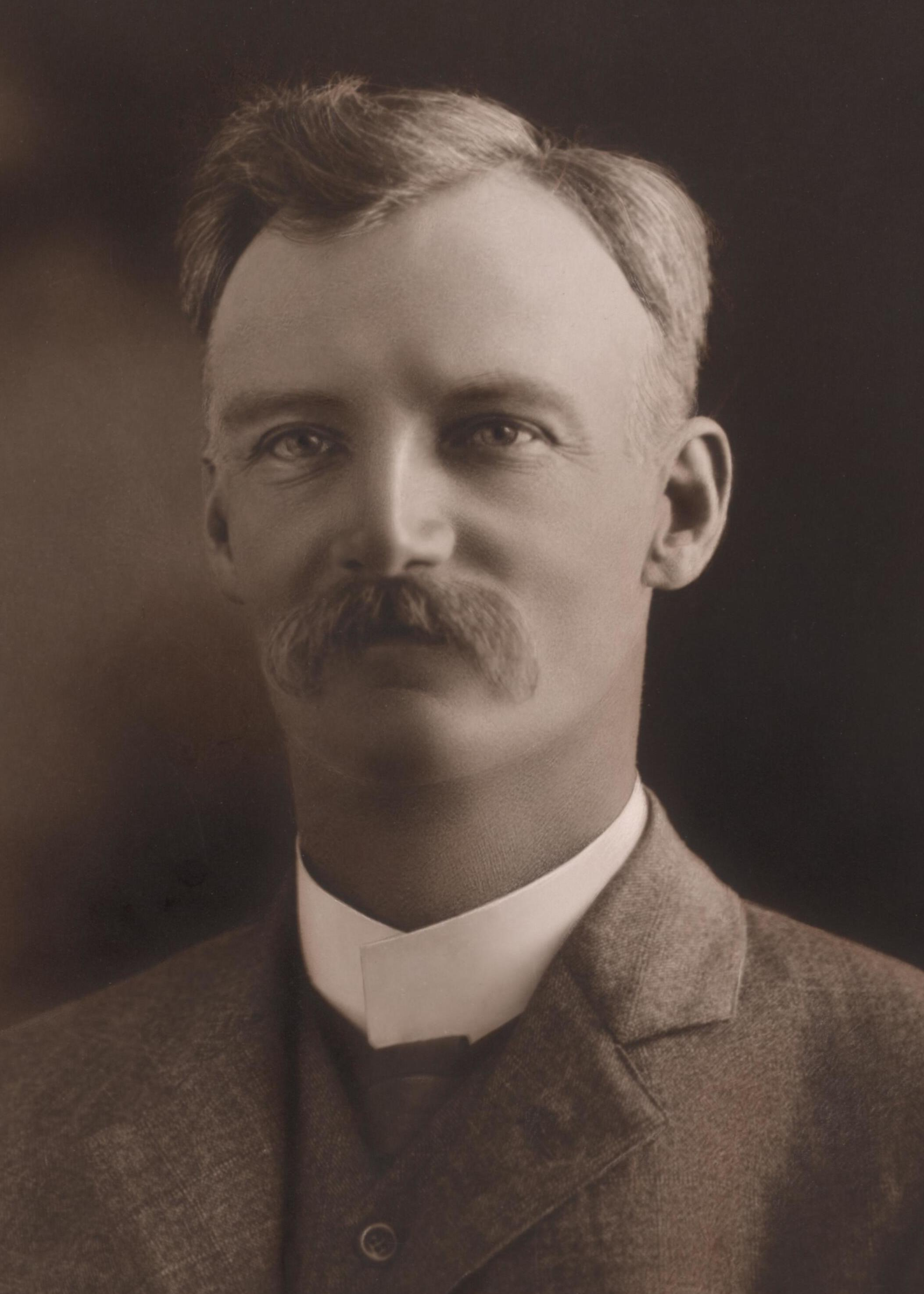
Batchelor, c. 1908

From 1908 to 1909, and again from 1910 to 1911, Batchelor was the Minister for External Affairs under the governments of Andrew Fisher. Batchelor attended the 1911 Imperial Conference along with Fisher, as the leading spokesperson on trade and foreign policy matters.

When the Northern Territory was transferred to the control of the Commonwealth in January 1911, Batchelor was the first minister to be given the responsibility of overseeing the administration of the territory. During this time he worked to create reserves for the Indigenous peoples of the Northern Territory.

A 'vigorous, wiry-looking abstemious man', Batchelor was, however, never robust. On 8 October 1911, when climbing Mount Donna Buang near Warburton, Victoria, with fellow members of the Wallaby Club, he collapsed from a heart attack and died immediately at age 46. After a memorial service in Melbourne, his body was returned to Adelaide for burial in West Terrace cemetery. He was survived by his wife and six children.

He was the first serving Minister who was also a member of the parliament to die in office (Sir James Dickson, Minister for Defence, died in January 1901 but he was not a member of parliament). Shortly after his death, in 1912, the town of Batchelor, Northern Territory (which is about 98 kilometres south of Darwin) was named after him.

== Sources ==
- McMullin, R., (2004) So Monstrous a Travesty: Chris Watson and the world’s first national labour government, Scribe Publications: Sydney. ISBN 1 920 76912 9.

Political offices
Preceded by John Forrest	Minister for Home Affairs; 1904	Succeeded by Dugald Thomson
Preceded by Alfred Deakin	Minister for External Affairs; 1908–1909	Succeeded by Littleton Groom
Preceded by Littleton Groom	Minister for External Affairs; 1910–1911	Succeeded by Josiah Thomas
Parliament of Australia
New division	Member for South Australia; 1901–1903; Served alongside: Bonython, Glynn, Holder, Kingston, Poynton, Solomon	Electorate abolished
New division	Member for Boothby; 1903–1911	Succeeded by David Gordon
Parliament of South Australia
Preceded by Lawrence Grayson	Member for West Adelaide; 1893 – 1901; Served alongside: Charles Kingston, Bill Denny	Succeeded by Francis Keogh
Party political offices
Preceded by John McPherson	Leader of the United Labor Party; 1898 – 1899	Succeeded by Thomas Price
