= Electoral district of East Adelaide =

Former South Australian state electoral district

Coordinates: 34°56′S 138°35′E

East Adelaide South Australia—House of Assembly
- State: South Australia
- Created: 1862
- Abolished: 1902
- Namesake: East Adelaide
- Demographic: Metropolitan

East Adelaide was an electoral district of the South Australian Legislative Council from 1851 to 1857 and an electoral district of the South Australian House of Assembly from 1862 to 1902.

== First incarnation ==
East Adelaide was a seat of the unicameral South Australian Legislative Council from 1851 until that council's abolition in 1857. Francis Stacker Dutton was the elected member for the duration.

== Second incarnation ==
The lower house electoral district was created when the Electoral district of City of Adelaide was abolished in 1862 and East Adelaide and Electoral district of West Adelaide created. The district of Adelaide was ultimately recreated in 1902 by the recombination of East Adelaide and West Adelaide.

The electorate was created by the Electoral Districts Act (No. 20) of the South Australian parliament in 1861 but it was not until the state election of 1862 election that candidates were first elected to represent East Adelaide. The electorate at its creation included all of the City of Adelaide (South Adelaide, North Adelaide and the Adelaide parklands) east of the centres of King William Street, Poole street, John Street and O'Connell Street.

In 1872 the area of the electorate shrunk when the Electoral district of North Adelaide was created by excising those parts of East and West Adelaide south of the River Torrens.

Successful 1891 Wallaroo by-election candidate Richard Hooper was the first Labor member of the House of Assembly, but was not a member of the newly formed United Labor Party (ULP), instead serving as an independent Labor member. The 1892 East Adelaide by-election saw ULP candidate John McPherson win the seat. It was the first time the ULP had won a seat in the House of Assembly, with electoral success to be followed at the 1893 colonial election, winning 10 of 54 seats and the balance of power, allowing the ULP to support the liberal opposition led by Charles Kingston in defeating the conservative government led by John Downer.

=== Members ===
Member	Party	Term	Member	Party	Term
William Bakewell		1862–1864	Philip Santo		1862–1868
Thomas Reynolds		1864–1870	Philip Santo		1862–1868
Thomas Reynolds		1864–1870	Robert Cottrell		1868–1875
David Murray		1870–1871	Robert Cottrell		1868–1875
John Cox Bray		1871–1892	Robert Cottrell		1868–1875
John Cox Bray		1871–1892	William Kay		1875–1878
John Cox Bray		1871–1892	George Fowler		1878–1881
John Cox Bray		1871–1892	Thomas Johnson		1881–1884
John Cox Bray		1871–1892	George Dutton Green		1884–1886
John Cox Bray		1871–1892	Theodor Scherk		1886–1902
John McPherson	Labor	1892–1897	Theodor Scherk		1886–1902
James Hutchison	Labor	1898–1902	Theodor Scherk		1886–1902
