= 1892 East Adelaide colonial by-election =

A by-election was held for the South Australian House of Assembly seat of East Adelaide on 23 January 1892. This was triggered by the resignation of the progressive former premier and state MHA John Cox Bray.

Successful 1891 Wallaroo by-election candidate Richard Hooper was the first Labor member of the House of Assembly, but was not a member of the newly formed United Labor Party (ULP), instead serving as an independent Labor member. Although he attended caucus meetings he never joined the ULP. The 1892 East Adelaide by-election saw ULP candidate John McPherson win the seat. It was the first time the ULP had won a seat in the House of Assembly, with electoral success to be followed at the 1893 colonial election, winning 10 of 54 seats and the balance of power, allowing the ULP to support the liberal opposition led by Charles Kingston in defeating the conservative government led by John Downer.

== Results ==
East Adelaide state by-election, 23 January 1892
Party	Candidate	Votes	%	±%
Labor	John McPherson	1,200	53.9	N/A
	George Fowler	1,026	46.1	N/A
Labor gain from Other		Swing	N/A	

== See also ==
- List of South Australian state by-elections
