= James Bath (headmaster) =

James Bath (c. 1830 – 20 May 1901) was head of a school attached to Christ Church, North Adelaide, South Australia, before founding his own school. He later joined the colonial public service, eventually serving as secretary to a succession of Ministers for Education.

== History ==
Bath was born in England, and was educated at a school near Malmesbury, Wiltshire, at which school he served for a few years as assistant master. Influenced by George Blakiston Wilkinson's book South Australia: its advantages and resources and J. C. Byrne's Twelve Years Wandering in the British Colonies, he emigrated to South Australia aboard the Asia, arriving at Port Adelaide in September 1851. He had only been in the colony a month when he was appointed headmaster of the (Anglican) Christ Church school in North Adelaide. Shortly after, the great Victorian gold rush began, leaving South Australia with a shortage of adult male workers and a collapse of the local economy, and Bath was left to cope with 100 students with little assistance. James Shakespeare was one ex-student who assisted for a year or two. After ten years Bath founded his own school, the "North Adelaide Classical and Mercantile Academy", in nearby Ward Street. The school ran until 1867, when he successfully applied for a position as Secretary to the Central Board of Education, which in 1877 was replaced with the Council of Education, Bath again serving as Secretary. In 1883 he was appointed Secretary to the Minister of Education, and served in that capacity under fourteen Ministers, one of whom, William Copley, was once one of his students.

== Family ==
James Bath married Mary Hardy (d. 29 March 1887) in England. Their children included:

- Emily Bath (1852–1917) married Edmund Chauntrell Hughes in 1883
- Alice Isabella Bath (b. 1854)
- Hubert Bath (b. 1856)
- Louisa Mary Bath (1858–1882)
- Matilda Evelyn/Evelyn Matilda Bath (1860–1921)
- Elsie Mabel Bath (b. 1867) married Harold Whitfield Williams in 1888
- Helena Ethel Bath (1869 – 7 June 1909) married James Gordon Stewart (c. 1870 – 19 June 1899) in 1896. She married again, to Andrew Adams on 28 April 1909 and died a month later.
