= Hugh Craine Kelly =

Australian politician

Hugh Craine Kelly (2 December 1848 – 13 January 1891) was a farmer and politician in colonial South Australia.

Hugh was born the fifth son of William Kelly (1804–1888) of Cudlee Creek and Gumeracha, South Australia. He was educated at Prince Alfred College and farmed at Alma, South Australia. He was of Chairman of the Alma District Council and President of the Alma Farmers' Union. He was a worker for the temperance movement and lay preacher at his Wesleyan Methodist church.

He was elected to the seat of Wooroora in the South Australian House of Assembly and served from April 1890 until the following January, when he died as a result of being thrown from a buggy near Port Wakefield. James Cowan and J. G. Ramsay met similar deaths. One critic praised him for his clear and melodious voice, his matter-of-fact clarity of expression, steadfastness of purpose and imperviousness to flattery.

His brother Robert won the ensuing by-election.

His wife Alice Lousia Ridgway (19 Apr 1856 - 7 Mar 1914), married 15 Mar 1876, at the residence of the brides father John Ridgway, at Salter's Springs, South Australia. They had no children.

== Family ==
William Kelly (2 December 1804 – 31 December 1888) married Catherine Cowley ( – ) and had one son. He married again, to Jane Christiana Caley (1819 – 13 March 1893) on 27 January 1838, and emigrated to South Australia on the Lloyds, arriving in December 1838. Among their children were:

- William Kelly (1825 – 1 May 1891) married Elizabeth Ann Gould (19 August 1826 – 9 October 1924), lived at Goulds Creek, Onetree Hill.

- Joseph Kelly ( – ) of Maitland
- William Kelly ( – April 1915) of Maitland

- W. C. Kelly ( – 14 July 1918) killed in action

- John McClelland Kelly (c. 1841 – 25 December 1906)
- youngest daughter Annie Kelly ( – ) married Edward Henry Rhodes ( – ) on 16 February 1892

- Esther Kelly (1840 – 6 July 1868) married Robert Clarke (c. 1830 – 5 November 1903) of Rapid Bay on 7 April 1860, lived at "Mona Vale", Tarlee.
- John Kelly (23 February 1843 – 1923) married Mary Jane Moore (1844 – 10 March 1905) of Gumeracha on 21 April 1866; they farmed at "Hartley", Riverton. He married again, on 1 August 1906, to the widow Mary Anne Graham (1855–1938).
- Robert Kelly (6 May 1845 – 26 October 1920) married Mary Goldsack (6 February 1848 – 19 June 1894) of Glen Osmond on 21 July 1870, farmed at "Oaklands", Tarlee.

- William Stanley Kelly (15 August 1882 – 5 June 1969) married Ada May Dawson ( – ) on 10 February 1909. He farmed at Merindie Station, Giles Corner and was significant in the development of the meat export trade.
- Hugh Craine Kelly (1894 – 18 October 1917) was killed in action during World War I

- Thomas "Tom" Kelly (1847 – 19 June 1925) married cousin Phebe Ann Kelly (1856 – 4 October 1917) of Yankalilla on 12 October 1876. They farmed at "Ramsey House", Alma; he later retired to "Ramsey", Joslin, South Australia.
- Annie Kelly (c. 1853 – 1 November 1881) married Charles Dunn jnr (c. 1841 – 4 October 1920) of Charleston, South Australia on 2 April 1874. Charles was the second son of Charles Dunn (c. 1795 – 3 June 1881), who founded Charleston and was brother of John Dunn of Mount Barker. She was Charles Dunn jnr's second wife, the first having died on 23 July 1873. On 4 June 1889 Charles married again, to Kate Temby (c. 1851 – 20 April 1929).
- Hugh Craine Kelly (2 December 1848 – 13 January 1891) married Alice Louisa Ridgway ( – ) of Salter's Springs on 15 March 1876.
- adopted daughter Julia Hannah Kelly (c. 1854 – 12 October 1882) married chemist Walter Long (1850–1919) on 2 April 1874
- Catherine Isabella "Bella" Kelly (1855 – 22 August 1921) married Elliott Hannaford (9 June 1856 – 2 July 1934) on 22 June 1876. Elliott was a son of Frederick Hannaford M.P. and descendant of Susannah Hannaford. They lived at "Pekina Lodge" Orroroo, later "Riverside", Cudlee Creek.
- Edward Kelly (1858 – 30 March 1931) married Mary Ann "May" Randell (28 January 1860 – 17 February 1931) of Gumeracha on 20 July 1882, and farmed at "Sulby Glen", Cudlee Creek. Mary Ann was a daughter of William Randell, the riverboat pioneer; his paddle-steamer Mary Ann was named for her.

- Edward William Kelly ( – ) married Olive Eva Teakle ( – ) of Kenton Valley on 22 June 1912

- Elizabeth Kelly (1860–1941) married Thomas Edwin Medlyn (1857–1930)

Hugh Craine Kelly (1814 – when?)

Robert Kelly (1823 – 17 May 1893) was married to Mary Ann Kelly ( – 14 May 1893) farmed at "Cornhill", Yankalilla, retired to Knightsbridge. and died within four days of each other.

- John Robert Kelly (26 September 1849 – 1 September 1919), member for Encounter Bay 1890 to 1896, then farmed at Oakey, Queensland.
- Phebe Ann Kelly (1856 – 4 October 1917) married cousin Thomas Kelly (1847 – 19 June 1925) on 12 October 1876, farmed at "Ramsey House", Alma; he later retired to "Ramsey", Joslin, South Australia.

Another early settler, though probably unrelated, can be mentioned here to avoid confusion: Robert Symons Kelly (c. 1817 – 29 September 1893) married Elizabeth (c. 1810 – 14 March 1893), arrived in the Platina in February 1839 and settled at Modbury, which he named for his home town.
