= Joseph Glynn (politician) =

Sir Joseph Aloysius Glynn (16 August 1869 – 6 March 1951) was an Irish politician, knight and historian.

Glynn was the son of John McMahon Glynn of Gort, County Galway. His older brother Patrick Glynn emigrated to Australia and became a government minister. Educated at Blackrock College, he became a solicitor in 1890. Nine years later he was elected to Galway County Council and acted as its chairman from 1902 to 1912.

Glynn served as chairman of the Natural Insurance Commissioners from 1911 to 1933. He was knighted in 1915. While President of the Irish Council of St. Vincent de Paul, he was admitted to the Order of St. Gregory the Great. He was also a leading member of An Ríoghacht.

He married Bride Donnellan, daughter of John O'Neil Donnellon, in 1894. After her death in 1921, he married her younger sister, Kate, in 1923. He died in 1951 in Dublin, aged 82.

== Bibliography ==
- Knockmoy Abbey, in Journal of the Royal Society of Antiquaries, xxiv, 1904
- Life of Matt Talbot, Catholic Truth Society, Dublin, 1927
- Beatha Mhartin Talboid 1856–1927, 1935
