= Joseph Hancock (politician) =

Australian politician

Joseph Hancock (23 August 1856 – 8 February 1916) was an Australian politician who represented the South Australian House of Assembly seat of Newcastle from 1890 to 1893.
