= John McPherson =

Australian politician (1860–1897)

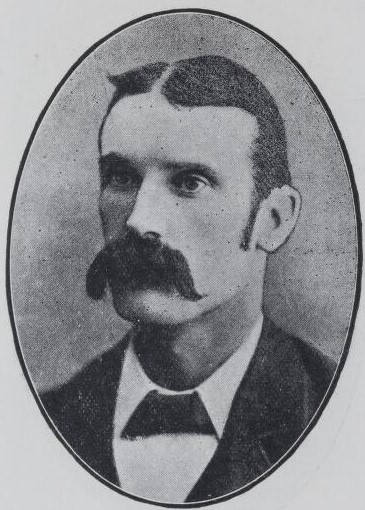

1st Leader of the United Labor Party
- In office 23 February 1892 – 13 December 1897
- Succeeded by: Lee Batchelor

Personal details
- Born: John Abel McPherson; 28 January 1860
- Died: 13 December 1897
- Party: United Labor Party

John Abel McPherson (28 January 1860 – 13 December 1897) was the first leader of the South Australian United Labor Party from 1892 to 1897. Though he never led a government himself, he helped lay the groundwork which ensured that at the 1905 election, Thomas Price would form the world's first stable Labor government. John Verran led Labor to form the state's first of many majority governments at the 1910 election.

== Early life ==
McPherson was born in Aberdeen, Scotland and migrated with his wife to Adelaide in 1882, joining the South Australian Typographical Society and working as a printer.

McPherson played a big part in the building and management of the South Australian Trades Hall, home of the United Trades and Labor Council (UTLC) of which he became an honorary secretary in 1890. A pioneer in the Australian labour movement, he was an effective conciliator in disputes between employers and butchers, drivers, tanners and carriers, and maritime workers over shorter hours and wage regulation.

== Parliament ==
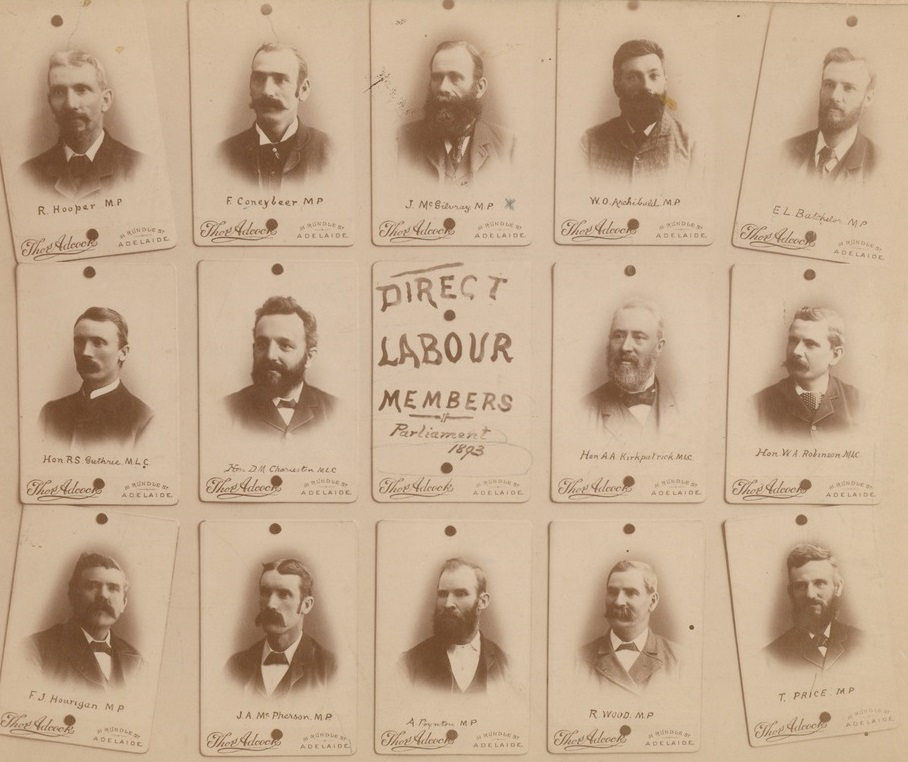
ULP parliamentarians following the 1893 colonial election.

A UTLC meeting with the purpose of creating an elections committee was convened on 12 December 1890, and held on 7 January 1891. The elections committee was formed, officially named the United Labor Party of South Australia with McPherson the founding secretary. Later that year, Labor enjoyed immediate success, electing David Charleston, Robert Guthrie and Andrew Kirkpatrick to the South Australian Legislative Council. A week later, Richard Hooper won the 1891 Wallaroo by-election as an independent Labor member in the South Australian House of Assembly. McPherson won the 1892 East Adelaide by-election on 23 January, becoming the first official Labor member of the House of Assembly at the age of 32. McPherson held the seat of East Adelaide until his death.

In his maiden speech, McPherson strongly deplored non-European immigration, as was the unanimous view of 19th century Australian man and politician alike, in conjunction with noting the many unemployed people in both city and country. He also advocated a progressive land tax and opening up the land to smallholders. He sat on the shops and factories commission which advocated consolidation and simplification of the Health Act and new laws to cover factories and working conditions. He was also an advocate for eight-hour working days and women's voting rights. McPherson was a frequent contributor in the House on Federation, giving characteristically cautious support - from the point of view of democracy, he was fearful of the power of the Senate.

Prior to the April 1893 election, all MPs were classed as independents regardless of their ideological leaning. As such, majority government did not exist, and frequent changes of Premier occurred. It was the first general election Labor would stand at, resulting in conservative and liberal leaning MPs beginning to divide, additionally with unidentified groupings and independents, as well as the formation of the staunchly anti-Labor National Defence League. The voluntary turnout rate increased from 53 to 68 percent, with Labor on 19 percent of the vote, and 10 Labor candidates including McPherson and Hooper were elected to the 54-member House of Assembly which gave Labor the balance of power. The liberal government of Charles Kingston was formed with the support of Labor, ousting the conservative government of John Downer. Kingston at times was accused by McPherson of conservatism. On occasion McPherson threatened to withdraw support from Kingston's cabinet, hoping to get a better deal from the opposition. Labor gained a 5.5 percent swing and another two seats at the April 1896 election. Kingston served as Premier for a then-record of six and a half years, usually implementing legislation with Labor support.

== Death ==
McPherson, diagnosed with cancer in August 1897, died the following December, aged only 37 years. James Hutchison retained the seat for Labor at the subsequent by-election. His funeral was attended by 1,000 mourners, who followed his coffin to West Terrace Cemetery. An oil portrait by Mrs E. Anson was presented to the Trades Hall and an inscription from Robert Browning was carved on his tombstone:

One who never turned his back but marched breast forward...

== Notes ==
South Australian House of Assembly
Preceded by John Bray	Member for East Adelaide; 1892 – 1897; Served alongside: Theodor Scherk	Succeeded by James Hutchison
Party political offices
New political party	Leader of the United Labor Party; 1892 – 1897	Succeeded by Lee Batchelor
