= John Robert Kelly =

Australian politician

John Robert Kelly (26 September 1849 – 1 September 1919) was a farmer and politician in colonial South Australia who later ran a farm in Queensland.

He was born near Yankalilla the eldest son of Robert (1823 – 17 May 1893) and Mary Ann Kelly, née Clarke, ( – 14 May 1893) who left London on the John Woodhall, arriving in South Australia in January 1849. They farmed at "Cornhill", Bald Hills near Yankalilla. John took over the farm when his parents retired to Knightsbridge.

He represented the electorate of Encounter Bay in the South Australian House of Assembly from April 1890 to April 1896, as an associate of Henry Downer. His cousins Hugh Craine Kelly and Robert Kelly represented Wooroora from April 1890 to January 1891 and February 1891 to April 1893 respectively.

He moved to Oakey on the Darling Downs, Queensland, where he ran a substantial farm, and was appointed a magistrate there in 1899. He actively supported Federation and was prominent in farmers' organizations. He was a founder, with W. Kent, of the Queensland Farmers' Union, and founded a land agency in 1912 with Edward Gore (c. 1877–1935). Kelly retired a few years later, but the company Edward Gore & Co. prospered.

== Family ==
Robert Kelly (1823 – 17 May 1893) married Mary Ann Clarke ( – 14 May 1893) before leaving for South Australia. They died within four days of each other. Their family included:

- John Robert Kelly (26 September 1849 – 1 September 1919) married Annie Mary Mitchell ( – ) on 31 August 1876.

- John Algar "Jack" Kelly (c. April 1882 – 9 May 1916) fought in Egypt during World War I, died there of pneumonia. He was buried in Egypt.

- Angus William Kelly (10 June 1851 – 2 October 1923) married Eva Priscilla Lovelock ( – ) on 26 April 1883. He was a successful farmer and grazier of Redhill and Booleroo, retired to Walkerville.
- Henry Edward Kelly (14 December 1853 – ) married Katherine Ross, née McIntosh ( – ) on 15 November 1887
- Esther Jane Kelly (14 August 1855 – 5 December 1889) married John Cornish ( – ) on 8 September 1876

- Florence Mary Cornish (c. 1877 – 15 July 1937) married L. J. Leverington ( – ) on 6 January 1902

- Phebe Ann Kelly (29 October 1856 – 2 October 1923) married Thomas Kelly (12 October 1876 – )
- Edgar Clarke Kelly (19 March 1858 – 5 November 1937) married Fanny Emma Jones ( – ) on 13 April 1882
