= 1893 South Australian colonial election =

- 15 April – 6 May 1893

All 54 seats in the South Australian House of Assembly (28 seats needed for a majority)
- Registered: 73,619
- Turnout: 67.6% (▲14.5 pp)
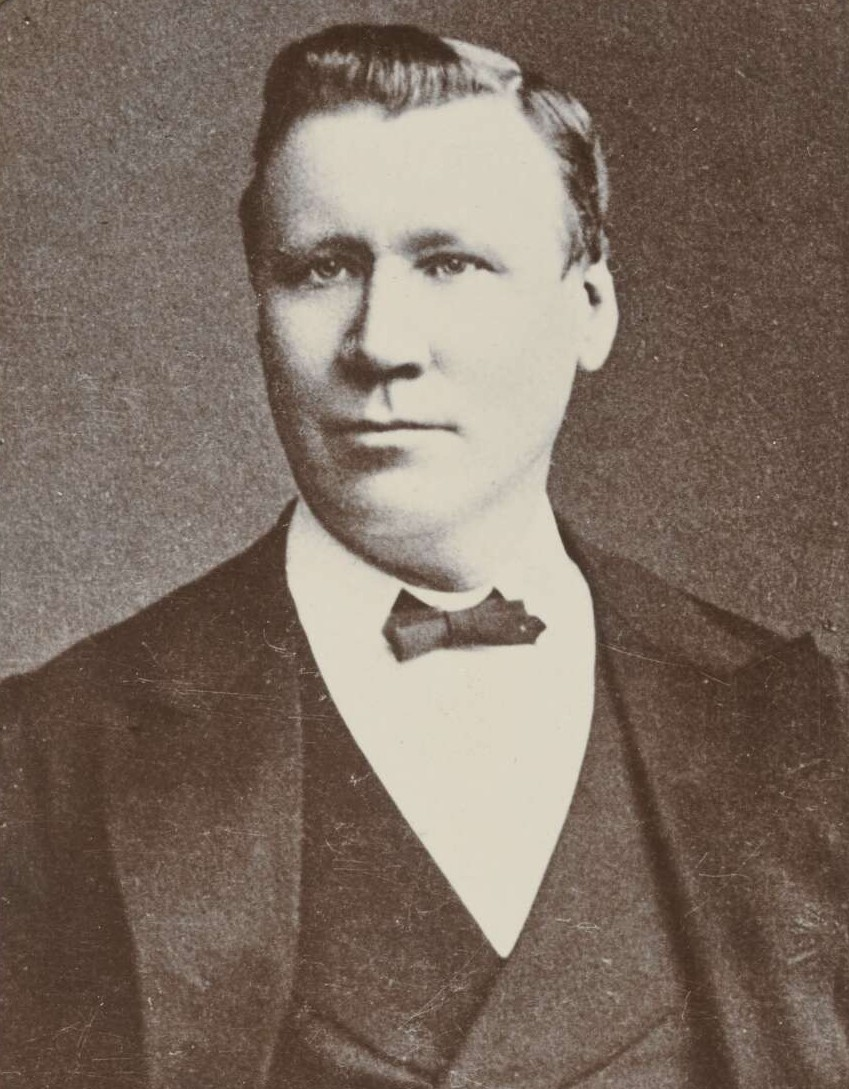

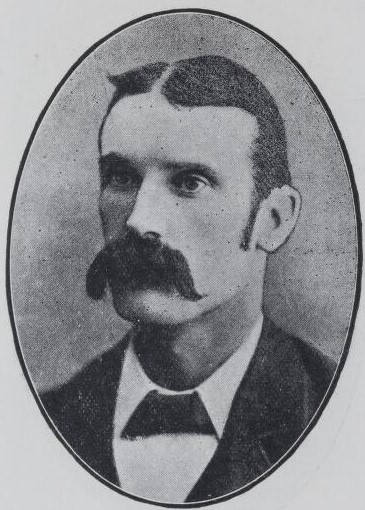
	First party	Second party	Third party
	IND
Leader	N/A	John Downer	John McPherson
Party	Independent	National Defence	United Labor
Leader since	N/A	N/A	23 February 1892
Leader's seat	N/A	Barossa	East Adelaide
Last election	54 seats	Did not exist	Did not exist
Seats before	52	0	2
Seats won	26	18	10
Seat change	▼26	▲18	▲8
Popular vote	51,805	19,438	16,458
Percentage	59.0%	22.2%	18.8%
Swing	▼41.0 pp	▲22.2 pp	▲18.8 pp
- Results by electoral district for the House of Assembly
Premier before election
John Downer
National Defence
Elected Premier
John Downer
National Defence

The 1893 South Australian colonial election was held between 15 April and 6 May 1893 to elect members to the 14th Parliament of South Australia. All 54 seats in the House of Assembly (the lower house, whose members were elected at the 1890 election) were up for re-election. This was the first state election contested by political parties; United Labor was formed in January 1891, which also led to the formation of the conservative National Defence League that same year. Independents won 26 seats, making them the largest contingency in the House. John Downer, the leader of the National Defence League, remained Premier for eight days after the formation of the new Parliament before he was replaced by Charles Kingston, who remained Premier for six years.

The election used non-compulsory plurality block voting, in which electors voted for as many candidates as they wished. Members of the House of Assembly were elected to 27 multi-member districts consisting of two seats each. Suffrage extended to men (including Aboriginal men) over 21 years of age, unless they were "attainted or convicted of treason or felony".

== Background ==
A United Trades and Labor Council meeting with the purpose of creating an elections committee was convened on 12 December 1890, and held on 7 January 1891. The elections committee was formed, officially named the United Labor Party of South Australia with McPherson the founding secretary. Later that year, the ULP enjoyed immediate success, electing David Charleston, Robert Guthrie and Andrew Kirkpatrick to the South Australian Legislative Council. A week later, Richard Hooper won the 1891 Wallaroo by-election as an independent Labor member in the South Australian House of Assembly. McPherson won the 1892 East Adelaide by-election on 23 January, becoming the first official Labor leader and member of the House of Assembly. At the 1893 election, ten Labor candidates including McPherson and Hooper were elected to the 54-member House of Assembly which gave the ULP the balance of power. So successful, a decade later at the 1905 election, Thomas Price would form the world's first stable Labor government. John Verran led Labor to form the state's first of many majority governments at the 1910 election.

In response to the ULP, the second party in South Australia formed − the National Defence League (NDL), created by the conservative forces in the colony, and this sharpened the existing conflict with the more 'radical groups'. It also reflected a trend for the conservative members to gravitate to the NDL, and the progressive members to support Kingston, a strong advocate of progressive social policy and reform of the Legislative Council. One issue which was increasingly dividing the Kingston liberal group and the NDL was the restrictive franchise for the Legislative Council. By the 1893 election, both the ULP and NDL had built up impressive electoral organisations. There was no "Liberal" or "Kingston" party, but there was a relatively cohesive Kingston group among both independent members and candidates. The Liberal and Democratic Union would not be formed until the 1906 election.

== Results ==
House of Assembly (BV) – Turnout 67.6% (Non-CV)
Party	Votes			Seats	
Party	Votes	%	Swing (pp)	Seats	Change
Independent	51,805	59.0	–41.0	26	▼26
National Defence	19,438	22.2	+22.2	18	▲18
United Labor	16,458	18.8	+18.8	10	▲8
Total	87,701	100.0	–	54	
Informal votes	649	1.3	–0.3		
Turnout	49,833	67.6	+14.5		
Registered voters	73,619	–	–		
Source: ECSA

== See also ==
- Members of the South Australian House of Assembly, 1893–1896
- 1891 South Australian Legislative Council election
