= John James Osman =

Australian politician (1847–1916)

Member of the South Australian House of Assembly for Victoria
- In office November 1888 – April 1893

Personal details
- Born: 1 December 1847 London, England
- Died: 24 February 1916 (aged 68) South Australia
- Spouse: Eliza Osborne
- Children: 6
- Occupation: Politician

John James Osman (1 December 1847 – 24 February 1916) was a politician in South Australia.

Osman was the son of Henry Osman and Charlotte his wife, was born in London, and went to Adelaide, South Australia, as a child in 1854. Osman, who was a captain in the Volunteer Force of South Australia, was married at Milnes Gap, South Australia to Miss Eliza Osborne on 10 January 1880. He was elected to the South Australian House of Assembly for the Victoria district at the by-election in November 1888, and was Minister of Lands in the John Cockburn Government from July to August 1890, after the retirement of James Howe. Osman was member for Victoria until April 1893.

Osman was married twice, he had five sons and a daughter by his second wife, Eliza Osborne, all born in Millicent, South Australia.
