= John William Castine =

Australian politician

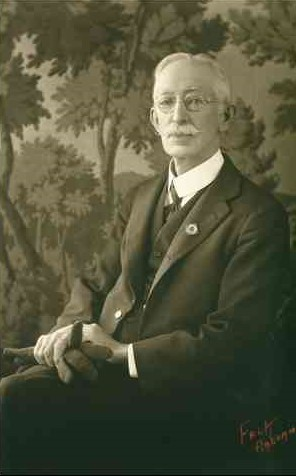
Castine in 1926

John William Castine (27 May 1846 – 13 June 1939) was an Australian politician who represented the South Australian House of Assembly multi-member seat of Wooroora from 1884 to 1902, representing the National Defence League from 1893.

Born in Plymouth, Devon in 1846, Castine migrated to South Australia in 1862 where he worked as a storekeeper. He enlisted in the Military Defence Force, where he rose to the rank of major before 1893. Parliamentary work included participation on royal commissions and committees. He served as a trustee of the Savings Bank and was for a time a director of the Botanical Gardens of South Australia.

== See also ==
- Hundred of Castine
