= Robert Kelly (politician) =

Australian politician

Robert Kelly (6 May 1845 – 26 October 1920) was an Australian politician. He was a member of the South Australian House of Assembly from 1891 to 1893, representing the electorate of Wooroora.

Kelly was a singer at Riverton, before being elected to fill the remainder of the term of his brother, Hugh Craine Kelly, who had died in an accident. He was educated at Adelaide Educational Institution and previously gained political experience as a member of the Royal Commission on pastoral lands. He was later a member of the Pastoral Board, forming a triumvirate with Surveyor-General W. Strawbridge and farmers' representative Ifould.
