= South Australian Labor Party =

Affiliate of the Labor Party in South Australia

South Australian Labor Party Australian Labor Party (South Australian Branch)
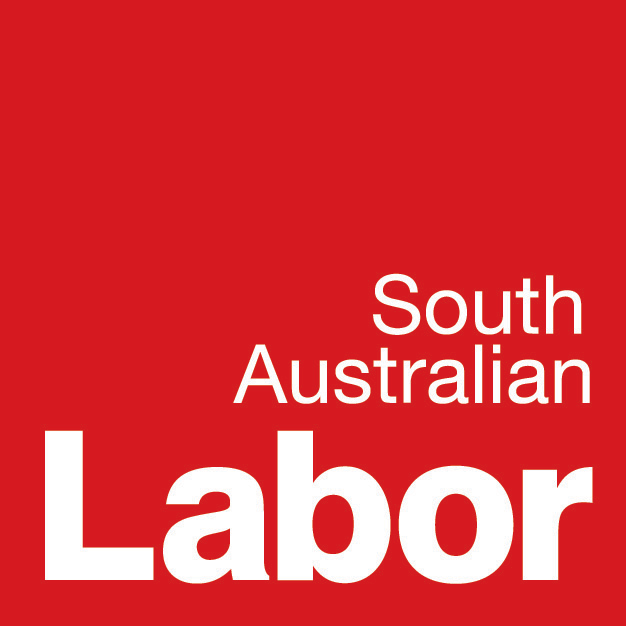
- Leader: Peter Malinauskas
- Deputy Leader: Kyam Maher
- President: Josh Peak
- Secretary: Aemon Bourke
- Founded: 7 January 1891; 135 years ago
- Headquarters: 141 Gilles Street, Adelaide, South Australia
- Youth wing: South Australian Young Labor
- Women's wing: Labor Women's Network
- LGBT wing: Rainbow Labor
- Ideology: Social democracy
- Political position: Centre-left
- National affiliation: Australian Labor
- Colours: Red
- Slogan: For the Future
- House of Assembly: 34 / 47
- Legislative Council: 10 / 22
- House of Representatives: 7 / 10 (SA seats)
- Senate: 5 / 12 (SA seats)

Website
- sa.alp.org.au

Seats in local government
- Adelaide: 4 / 12
- Charles Sturt: 4 / 17
- Holdfast Bay: 1 / 13
- Marion: 1 / 13
- Port Adelaide Enfield: 7 / 18
- Prospect: 1 / 9
- Tea Tree Gully: 2 / 14
- West Torrens: 4 / 15

The South Australian Labor Party, officially the Australian Labor Party (South Australian Branch), is the affiliate of the Australian Labor Party (ALP) in the Australian state of South Australia and is the major progressive centre-left political party in South Australian politics. The party is the oldest continuously active political party in the states history and the most electorally successful contemporary party in South Australia having won thirteen of the last seventeen state elections since 1970. Peter Malinauskas has served as Labor’s state parliamentary leader since 2018 and Aemon Bourke as party state secretary since 2022.

Formed as the United Labor Party in 1891, the South Australian Labor Party was the first Labor party in the world to hold stable government in 1905 under the leadership of Premier Tom Price. Since the 1970 election, marking the beginning of democratic fair representation (one vote, one value) and ending decades of pro-rural electoral malapportionment known as the Playmander, Labor have won 13 of the 17 elections. Spanning 16 years and 4 terms, Labor was in government from the 2002 election until the 2018 election. Jay Weatherill led the Labor government since a 2011 leadership change from Mike Rann. During 2013 it became the longest-serving state Labor government in South Australian history, and went on to win a fourth four-year term at the 2014 election. After losing the 2018 election, the party spent 4 years in opposition before leader Peter Malinauskas led the party to landslide victories in the 2022 and 2026 state elections.

Labor's most notable historic Premiers of South Australia include Thomas Price in the 1900s, Don Dunstan in the 1970s, John Bannon in the 1980s, and Mike Rann in the 2000s.

== Formation ==
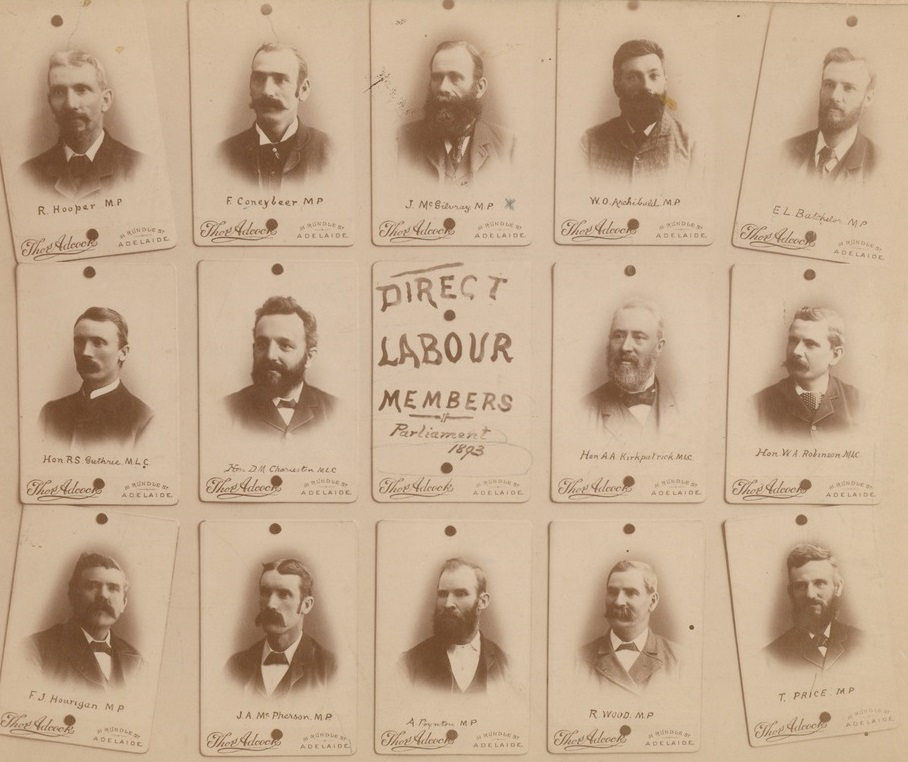
ULP parliamentarians following the 1893 colonial election.

A United Trades and Labor Council meeting with the purpose of creating an elections committee was convened on 12 December 1890, and held on 7 January 1891. The elections committee was formed, officially named the United Labor Party of South Australia (unlike state Labor, prior to 1912 their federal counterparts included the 'u' in their spelling of Labour) with John McPherson the founding secretary. Four months later, Labor enjoyed immediate success, electing David Charleston, Robert Guthrie and Andrew Kirkpatrick to the South Australian Legislative Council. A week later, Richard Hooper won the 1891 Wallaroo by-election as an independent Labor member in the South Australian House of Assembly. McPherson won the 1892 East Adelaide by-election on 23 January, becoming the first official Labor leader and member of the House of Assembly.

Prior to party creation, South Australian politics had lacked parties or solid groupings, although loose liberal and conservative blocs had begun to develop by the end of the 1880s. The 1893 election was the first general election Labor would stand at, resulting in liberal and conservative leaning MPs beginning to divide, additionally with unidentified groupings and independents, as well as the subsequent formation of the staunchly anti-Labor National Defence League. The voluntary turnout rate increased from 53 to 68 percent, with Labor on 19 percent of the vote, and 10 Labor candidates including McPherson and Hooper were elected to the 54-member House of Assembly which gave Labor the balance of power. The Kingston liberal government was formed with the support of Labor, ousting the Downer conservative government. Kingston served as Premier for a then-record of six and a half years, usually implementing legislation with Labor support.

Thomas Price formed the state's first Labor minority government and the world's first stable Labor Party government at the 1905 election with the support of several non-Labor MPs to form the Price-Peake administration, which was re-elected at the 1906 double dissolution election, with Labor falling just two seats short of a majority. So successful, John Verran led Labor to form the state's first of many majority governments at the 1910 election, just two weeks after the 1910 federal election where their federal counterparts formed Australia's first elected majority in either house in the Parliament of Australia, the world's first Labor Party majority government at a national level, and after the 1904 Chris Watson minority government the world's second Labor Party government at a national level.

Known as the United Labor Party of South Australia until 1917, the Australian Labor Party at both a state/colony and federal level pre-dates, among others, both the British Labour Party and the New Zealand Labour Party in party formation, government, and policy implementation.

== Premiers ==
Parliamentary Party Leader
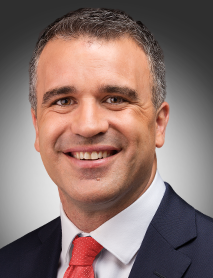
- Incumbent; Peter Malinauskas since 9 April 2018
- Deputy: Kyam Maher

Thirteen of the nineteen parliamentary Labor leaders have served as Premier of South Australia: Thomas Price (1905–1909), John Verran (1910–1912), Crawford Vaughan (1915–1917), John Gunn (1924–1926), Lionel Hill (1926–1927 and 1930–1931; expelled from party but continued as Premier until 1933), Frank Walsh (1965–1967), Don Dunstan (1967–1968 and 1970–1979), Des Corcoran (1979), John Bannon (1982–1992), Lynn Arnold (1992–1993), Mike Rann (2002–2011), Jay Weatherill (2011–2018) and Peter Malinauskas (2022–present). Robert Richards was Premier in 1933 while leading the rebel Parliamentary Labor Party of MPs who had been expelled in the 1931 Labor split; he would later be readmitted and lead the party in opposition. Bannon is Labor's longest-serving Premier of South Australia, ahead of Rann and Dunstan by a matter of weeks. Every Labor leader for more than half a century has gone on to serve as Premier.

== Deputy Premiers ==
Since the position's formal introduction in 1968, nine parliamentary Labor deputy leaders have served as Deputy Premier of South Australia: Des Corcoran (1968 and 1970–1979), Hugh Hudson (1979), Jack Wright (1982–1985), Don Hopgood (1985–1992), Frank Blevins (1992–1993), Kevin Foley (2002–2011), John Rau (2011–18), Susan Close (2022–2025) and Kyam Maher (2025–present). Foley is the state's longest-serving Deputy Premier.

== List of parliamentary leaders ==
No	Party leader	Constituency	Assumed office	Left office	Premier	Reason for departure
1	John McPherson	East Adelaide (1892–1897)	23 February 1892	13 December 1897		Died
2	Lee Batchelor	West Adelaide (1893–1901)	1897/1898	12 December 1899		Joined federal parliament
3	Tom Price	Sturt/Torrens (1893–1909)	12 December 1899	31 May 1909	1905–1909	Died
4	John Verran	Wallaroo (1901–1917)	1909	26 July 1913	1910–1912	Lost party room challenge to Vaughan
5	Crawford Vaughan	Torrens/Sturt (1905–1918)	26 July 1913	12 February 1917	1915–1917	Quit party
6	Andrew Kirkpatrick	Leg. Council (1891–1897; 1900–1905); Newcastle (1915–1918)	6 March 1917	15 February 1918		Retired
7	John Gunn	Adelaide (1915–1926)	18 April 1918	18 August 1926	1924–1926	Resigned
8	Lionel Hill	East Torrens / Port Pirie (1915–1933)	18 August 1926	15 August 1931	1926–1927; 1930–1933	Expelled from party
9	Edgar Dawes	Sturt (1930–1933)	12 May 1932	22 April 1933		Lost seat in 1933 election
10	Andrew Lacey	Port Pirie (1933–1946)	22 April 1933	1 April 1938		Stepped down after splinter parties merged
11	Robert Richards	Wallaroo (1918–1949)	1 April 1938	27 October 1949	(1933)	Retired
12	Mick O'Halloran	Burra Burra (1918–1927); Frome (1938–1960)	27 October 1949	22 September 1960		Died
13	Frank Walsh	Goodwood / Edwardstown (1941–1968)	22 September 1960; Acting until 5 October 1960	1 June 1967	1965–1967	Retired
14	Don Dunstan	Norwood (1953–1979)	1 June 1967	15 February 1979	1967–1968; 1970–1979	Resigned
15	Des Corcoran	Millicent / Coles / Hartley (1962–1982)	15 February 1979; Acting until 15 March 1979	2 October 1979	1979	Resigned after 1979 election loss
16	John Bannon	Ross Smith (1977–1993)	2 October 1979	4 September 1992	1982–1992	Resigned
17	Lynn Arnold	Salisbury / Ramsay / Taylor (1979–1994)	4 September 1992	20 September 1994	1992–1993	Resigned
18	Mike Rann	Briggs / Ramsay (1985–2012)	20 September 1994	21 October 2011	2002–2011	Lost party room challenge to Weatherill
19	Jay Weatherill	Cheltenham (2002–2018)	21 October 2011	9 April 2018	2011–2018	Resigned after 2018 election loss
20	Peter Malinauskas	Leg. Council (2015–2018); Croydon (since 2018)	9 April 2018		2022–	

== List of deputy parliamentary leaders ==
Party deputy leader	Assumed office	Left office	Deputy Premier
John Fitzgerald	21 April 1933	22 June 1934	
Robert Richards	22 June 1934	1 April 1938	
Andrew Lacey	1 April 1938	4 September 1946	
Mick O'Halloran	4 September 1946	27 October 1949	
Frank Walsh	27 October 1949	5 October 1960	
Cyril Hutchens	5 October 1960	1 June 1967	
Des Corcoran	1 June 1967	15 March 1979	1967–1968; 1970–1979
Hugh Hudson	15 March 1979	2 October 1979	1979
Jack Wright	2 October 1979	16 July 1985	1982–1985
Dr. Don Hopgood	26 July 1985	4 September 1992	1985–1992
Frank Blevins	4 September 1992	14 December 1993	1992–1993
Mike Rann	14 December 1993	20 September 1994	
Ralph Clarke	20 September 1994	31 December 1996	
Annette Hurley	1 January 1997	February 2002	
Kevin Foley	February 2002	7 February 2011	2002–2011
John Rau	7 February 2011	9 April 2018	2011–2018
Susan Close	9 April 2018	19 September 2025	2022–2025
Kyam Maher	19 September 2025		2025–present

== Current federal parliamentarians ==
=== House of Representatives ===
- Matt Burnell – Spence MP since 2022
- Mark Butler – Hindmarsh MP since 2019, previously Port Adelaide MP from 2007 to 2019.
- Claire Clutterham – Sturt MP since 2025
- Steve Georganas – Adelaide MP since 2019, previously Hindmarsh MP from 2004 to 2013 and again from 2016 to 2019.
- Louise Miller-Frost – Boothby MP since 2022
- Amanda Rishworth – Kingston MP since 2007
- Tony Zappia – Makin MP since 2007

=== Senate ===
- Don Farrell – since 2016
- Karen Grogan – since 2021
- Marielle Smith – since 2019
- Penny Wong – since 2002
- Charlotte Walker – since 2025

== Historic party officials ==
- Elizabeth Rose Hanretty

== Electoral performance ==
=== House of Assembly ===
Election	Leader	Votes	%	Seats	+/–	Position	Status
1893	John McPherson	16,458	18.8	10 / 54	▲10	▲3rd	Crossbench
1896	John McPherson	39,107	24.3	12 / 54	▲2	3rd	Crossbench
1899	Lee Batchelor	40,756	25.4	11 / 54	▼1	3rd	Crossbench
1902	Thomas Price	48,515	19.9	5 / 42	▼6	3rd	Opposition
1905	Thomas Price	148,550	41.3	15 / 42	▲10	▲1st	Minority
1906	Thomas Price	143,577	44.8	20 / 42	▲5	1st	Minority
1910	John Verran	197,935	49.1	22 / 42	▲2	1st	Majority
1912	John Verran	253,163	46.7	16 / 40	▼6	▼2nd	Opposition
1915	Crawford Vaughan	153,034	45.9	26 / 46	▲10	▲1st	Majority
1918	Andrew Kirkpatrick	145,093	44.7	17 / 46	▼9	▼2nd	Opposition
1921	John Gunn	179,308	44.6	16 / 46	▼1	2nd	Opposition
1924	John Gunn	192,256	48.4	27 / 46	▲11	▲1st	Majority
1927	Lionel Hill	243,450	47.9	16 / 46	▼11	▼2nd	Opposition
1930	Lionel Hill	102,194	48.6	30 / 46	▲14	▲1st	Majority
1933	Edgar Dawes	48,273	27.8	6 / 46	▼24	▼2nd	Opposition
1938	Andrew Lacey	57,124	26.1	9 / 39	▲3	2nd	Opposition
1941	Robert Richards	56,062	33.3	11 / 39	▲2	2nd	Opposition
1944	Robert Richards	105,298	42.5	16 / 39	▲5	2nd	Opposition
1947	Robert Richards	133,959	48.6	13 / 39	▼3	2nd	Opposition
1950	Mick O'Halloran	134,952	48.1	12 / 39	▼1	2nd	Opposition
1953	Mick O'Halloran	166,517	50.9	14 / 39	▲2	2nd	Opposition
1956	Mick O'Halloran	129,853	47.4	15 / 39	▲1	2nd	Opposition
1959	Mick O'Halloran	191,933	49.3	17 / 39	▲2	2nd	Opposition
1962	Frank Walsh	219,790	53.9	19 / 39	▲2	▲1st	Opposition
1965	Frank Walsh	274,432	55.0	21 / 39	▲2	1st	Majority
1968	Don Dunstan	292,445	51.9	19 / 39	▼2	1st	Opposition
1970	Don Dunstan	305,478	51.6	27 / 47	▲8	1st	Majority
1973	Don Dunstan	324,135	51.5	26 / 47	▼1	1st	Majority
1975	Don Dunstan	321,481	46.3	23 / 47	▼3	1st	Majority
1977	Don Dunstan	383,831	51.6	27 / 47	▲4	1st	Majority
1979	Des Corcoran	300,277	40.8	20 / 47	▼7	▼2nd	Opposition
1982	John Bannon	353,999	46.3	24 / 47	▲5	▲1st	Majority
1985	John Bannon	393,652	48.2	27 / 47	▲3	1st	Majority
1989	John Bannon	346,268	40.1	22 / 47	▼5	▼2nd	Minority
1993	Lynn Arnold	277,038	30.4	10 / 47	▼12	2nd	Opposition
1997	Mike Rann	312,929	35.2	21 / 47	▲11	2nd	Opposition
2002	Mike Rann	344,559	36.4	23 / 47	▲2	▲1st	Minority
2006	Mike Rann	424,715	45.2	28 / 47	▲5	1st	Majority
2010	Mike Rann	367,480	37.5	26 / 47	▼2	1st	Majority
2014	Jay Weatherill	364,420	35.8	23 / 47	▼3	1st	Minority (2014)
2014	Jay Weatherill	364,420	35.8	23 / 47	▼3	1st	Majority (2014–2017)
2014	Jay Weatherill	364,420	35.8	23 / 47	▼3	1st	Minority (2017–2018)
2018	Jay Weatherill	343,896	32.8	19 / 47	▼4	▼2nd	Opposition
2022	Peter Malinauskas	436,134	40.0	27 / 47	▲8	▲1st	Majority
2026	Peter Malinauskas	419,626	37.5	34 / 47	▲7	1st	Majority

== See also ==
- 2026 South Australian state election
- 2022 South Australian state election
- Members of the South Australian House of Assembly, 2022–2026
- Members of the South Australian Legislative Council, 2022–2026
- Liberal Party of Australia (South Australian Division)
- Playmander, the 1936–1968 electoral malapportionment
- Rann government
- List of elections in South Australia
