= Balance of power (parliament) =

Situation often leading to a minority or coalition government

In parliamentary politics, balance of power is a situation in which a minority government's survival depends on the cooperation of MPs who are not from the ruling party nor the official opposition. The members holding the balance of power may guarantee their support for a government by either joining it in a coalition government or a confidence and supply agreement. In return for such a commitment, such members may demand legislative or policy commitments from the party they are to support. A person or party may also hold a balance of power in a chamber without any commitment to government, in which case both the government and opposition groupings may on occasion need to negotiate for that person's or party's support.

== Australia ==
=== House of Representatives ===
In the 1940 federal election of the 74 seats in the House of Representatives, the United Australia/Country Coalition won 36 seats, the Labor Party won 32, the Non-Communist Labor Party won 4, and there were two independents, leaving the United Australia government of Robert Menzies without a majority in the lower house. The Coalition continued in government with the support of the two independents. The following year, the Non-Communist Labor Party, a breakaway Labor faction associated with former New South Wales premier Jack Lang, was readmitted to the Labor Party, and after the removal of Menzies by his own party, the independents in Parliament switched their support to Labor, allowing Opposition Leader John Curtin to form a minority government until his landslide reelection in 1943.

After the 2010 federal election of the 150 seats in the House of Representatives, both the Labor Party and the Liberal/National Coalition held 72 seats, and there was one Greens, one MP was a member of the National Party of Western Australia (which is not part of the Liberal/National Coalition), and four independents. After several weeks of negotiations, Labor Prime Minister Julia Gillard eventually retained power after signing separate confidence and supply agreements with the Greens and three of the independents. The agreements required the non-government party to support the government in a no-confidence motion and on supply bills, in return for the passage of some legislation, such as setting up an emissions trading scheme in the case of the Greens (see Gillard Government § Minority government). The Labor minority government was able to govern for the full term of the house.

=== Senate ===
The Senate, which serves as the nation's upper house and as a house of review, was established on the basis of ensuring that the smaller Colonies joining the Commonwealth were given equal representation, as required under the Commonwealth of Australia Constitution Act 1900. Between 1901 and 1918, Senators were elected on a first past the post system, changing to each state voting as one electorate on a preferential system from 1918 until 1948. During this period, the majority party in the lower house also generally had a commanding majority in the Senate. Since 1949, Senators are elected on the basis of achieving a transferable quota in each State or Territory. In more recent years, this method of election has generally resulted in a multi-party mix. In the early years after the establishment of the Commonwealth, Senators were more inclined to vote along State lines, with some exceptions.

The Senate has the power to reject, amend or defer bills passed by the lower house, thus obliging the government of the day to negotiate with minor parties in the Senate (or the opposition) in order to pass its legislation. The Australian Senate cannot directly bring down a government, though it can pass an indicative motion of no confidence and has the power to defer or block supply bills, as notoriously occurred in the constitutional crisis of 1975 which was precipitated, in part, by the deferment of supply through a manipulated balance of power.

== Canada ==
Compared to other Westminster Systems, minority governments are far more common in Canada. Much of this is credited to the relatively uneven electoral demographics of the country, with most national parties relying on regional bases. Throughout the 1950s, 1960s, and 1970s, minority Parliaments were quite common in Canada, and produced many subsequent political compromises through political cooperation, mostly between the Liberal Party of Canada and the New Democratic Party of Canada, which included the Canada Pension Plan and Universal Healthcare during the tenure of Lester B. Pearson. After the 1980 election, minority governments became less common in Canada for the next several decades, but the 2004 general election returned Canada to minority government, and the subsequent general elections of 2005–06 and 2008 would also result in minority governments, but the 2011 general election gave Stephen Harper's Conservatives a clear majority in the House of Commons for the first time since the merging of the Progressive Conservative Party and the Canadian Alliance. The 2019, 2021 and 2025 federal elections produced three consecutive Liberal minority governments, the longest unbroken stretch of minority government in federal Canadian history.

Despite the frequency of minority governments, however, coalitions are rare to nonexistent in Canadian democracy, especially in federal politics, and especially in the modern era. A notable exception was the political crisis that arose during the 2008–09 Canadian parliamentary dispute, in which the three opposition parties attempted to form a coalition government to oust the Conservative Party of Canada, which held a minority mandate in the House of Commons. This coalition failed, however, due to Governor-General Michaëlle Jean's resulting prorogation of Parliament until January 2009.

At the provincial level, by contrast, coalitions have governed in the provincial Parliaments of Saskatchewan, Manitoba, Ontario and British Columbia.

== France ==
Mainly due to the two-round system being in use for parliamentary elections, minority governments are extremely uncommon in France: since 1958 and the establishment of the Fifth Republic, France has only produced two hung parliaments and four minority administrations to date: in 1988, with the Socialists as the largest party, and in 2022, with the centrist presidential coalition emerging as the largest bloc in the lower house of Parliament.

=== 1988–1993 ===
President Mitterrand dissolved the lower house following his reelection as President of France in May 1988. After the 1988 French legislative election, the composition of parliament was Socialist Party (and allies) on 275, RPR-UDF on 220, Centrist Union on 41, Communists 25, Others on 14 put of a total of 577. This meant that no party had a majority in parliament.

The election produced a hung parliament with the Socialists emerging as the largest party but falling short of an overall majority. Both the Centrists and the Communists ended up holding the balance of power since either one could allow the government to cling onto power.

Prime Minister Michel Rocard, a centre-left figure, formed a new government after the parliamentary elections, incorporating independent centre-right ministers to attract support from the Centrist Union group. It enabled him to navigate through a fragmented National Assembly, relying alternately on centrist and communist lawmakers to pass significant legislation.

In 1991, Rocard was replaced with Édith Cresson, the first woman to lead a French government in history. Cresson formed a new minority government and, like Rocard, she appointed centrist ministers and, at times, relied on the Communists' support to push legislation through.

In 1992, Pierre Bérégovoy was appointed PM and, as his predecessor did, he formed a minority administration, again incorporating independent figures to Cabinet and bargaining with communist and centrist lawmakers to advance his policies. Just under a year into his tenure, Bérégovoy led the Socialists into crushing defeat in the 1993 French legislative election and subsequently resigned.

Throughout those five years in hung parliament territory, multiple motions of no confidence were brought forward and some of them failed by razor-thin margins. The closest vote of no confidence took place on 27 May 1992: it was tabled by centre-right to right-wing opposition lawmakers on the matter of Common Agricultural Policy reform and saw the Bérégovoy government surviving by only 3 votes (286 votes, short of the 289 required).

=== 2022–present ===
2022 French legislative election Ensemble (centrist presidential coalition) 245, NUPES (left-wing coalition) 131, RN (radical right) 89, LR (centre-right to right-wing) 64, miscellaneous left 22, miscellaneous right 10, regionalists 10, Others 6. Total seats 577.

The parliamentary elections, taking place less than two months after the 2022 presidential election, led to Macron's centrist government losing its majority in the National Assembly, ending up at least 38 short of the crucial 289-threshold needed to command a majority in the Chamber. The balance of power was therefore held by the centre-right to right-wing Republicans (LR), with a parliamentary group of 62 MPs.

On the 21 and 22 June, President Macron held talks with leaders from all parties represented in Parliament, stretching from the far-left to the far-right, in an effort to find common ground and, if possible, secure a majority in the lower house, either by forming a coalition government or by resorting to a national unity government. Talks eventually failed since no opposition party expressed interest in propelling a Macron-led government or forming a national union cabinet.

At the end on June, Macron's Prime Minister, Élisabeth Borne, in turn held talks with leaders from all opposition groups of the National Assembly, discussing the possibility of a coalition agreement or some sort of confidence-and-supply deal. The talks again failed to produce any meaningful result.

On 4 July, Macron reshuffled the Cabinet and officially formed a minority administration, a change symbolized by the PM's decision not to seek a vote of confidence in the lower house, as permitted by the French Constitution, since the government was likely to fall on such a vote.

As of 18 June 2023, 17 motions of no confidence against Macron's government were defeated since the beginning of the 16th National Assembly: the closest his government came to fall in Parliament (to date) was on 20 March 2023 when a cross-party no-confidence motion failed by only 9 votes, the slimmest margin for any French government since 1992. On this occasion as in several others since July 2022, it was the Republicans' policy of abstention that prevented Macron's government to collapse. Thus, some argue that the Republicans can be considered as granting confidence-and-supply to the executive power, despite no formal agreement being in place.

Nonetheless, precisely because no formal agreement with opposition parties has been signed, the Borne government has had to bargain with opposition groups (mainly with the Republicans' MPs) to get any meaningful legislation through. It also explains why the government has already been defeated on numerous occasions in Parliament, a rare occurrence in the Fifth Republic's history. At times, such an unprecedented situation has pushed the Cabinet toward using special constitutional provisions (mostly, the infamous constitutional article 49.3) to break parliamentary gridlock or to prevent failure on major bills (such as on the 2023 Government and Social Security budgets or on the 2023 pension system reform bill...).

== New Zealand ==
Since the implementation of a mixed-member proportional (MMP) and multi-party system, several small parties have commonly held the balance of power following elections in New Zealand. Following the first MMP election in 1996, New Zealand First, a third party, held the balance of power, and the formation of a new government by either of the two major parties, Labour and National, depended on the support of New Zealand First and its leader Winston Peters.. A similar situation occurred after the 2017 general election, when New Zealand First once again held the balance of power, and the formation of a new government by either of the two major parties, Labour and National, depended on its support.

== Sweden ==
With Sweden having proportional representation, small parties in the centre of politics often have vast influence over government formation, such as in the 2014 and 2018 election cycles, where the original coalitions could not form majorities in the Riksdag and bipartisan agreements were formed in bids to deny the Sweden Democrats the balance of power that was apparent by both election results. In 2018, the Social Democrats entered a pact with two centrist parties. This required the government to go against several key promises from the campaign regarding no tax cuts for high-income earners due to the coalition lacking a majority to stay otherwise. The Sweden Democrats voted for opposition budgets after both elections, leaving the leftist government to govern on right-leaning financial terms for the first halves of 2015 and 2019. Under the previous bloc-dominated politics, the balance of power was less flexible, with the smallest party of the governing bloc usually holding the balance of power courtesy of close elections.

== United Kingdom ==
The normal UK response to a "hung" or "balanced" parliament is the formation of a minority government. Coalitions or even formal agreements by one party to support the government of another party are rare.

1847–1852

Conservative 325, Whig and Radical 292, Irish Repeal 36, Irish Confederate 2, Chartist 1. Total seats 656.

The 1847 United Kingdom general election produced a House of Commons in which no group had a clear majority. Candidates calling themselves Conservatives won the largest number of seats. However, the split among the Conservatives between the majority of Protectionists, led by Lord Stanley, and the minority of free traders, known also as the Peelites, led by former prime minister Sir Robert Peel, left the Whigs, led by prime minister Lord John Russell, in a position to continue in government.

The Irish Repeal group won more seats than in the previous general election, while the Chartists' Feargus O'Connor gained the only seat the party would ever hold.

1885–1886

Liberal 319, Conservative 249, Irish Parliamentary Party 86, Others 16. Total seats 670.

As a result of the 1885 United Kingdom general election there was no single party with a majority in the House of Commons. The Irish Nationalists, led by Charles Stewart Parnell had the balance of power.

The Conservative minority government (led by the Marquess of Salisbury), which had come to office earlier in the year after the Parnellites and dissident Liberals had defeated the Liberal government of W.E. Gladstone, improved its position in the election but not sufficiently to obtain a majority. During the general election Parnell had called on Irish voters in Britain to vote Tory (i.e., Conservative).

However, as Gladstone was willing to propose a measure of Home Rule for Ireland which Salisbury opposed, Parnell decided to bring down the Conservative ministry when the new parliament met. A Liberal minority government came into office in January 1886.

1892–1895

Conservative and Liberal Unionist 313, Liberal 272, Irish Nationalists 81, Others 4. Total seats 670.

The situation was similar to that in 1885–86. Following the 1892 United Kingdom general election, although the Irish Nationalists were split between pro and anti-Parnellite factions, they all still preferred the pro-Home-Rule Liberals to the anti-Home-Rule Unionists of Salisbury. The Conservative government was defeated early in the new parliament and Gladstone formed a new Liberal minority government.

1910–1915

January 1910 United Kingdom general election Liberal 274, Conservative and Liberal Unionist 272, Irish Nationalists 82, Labour 40, Other 2. Total seats 670.

December 1910 United Kingdom general election Liberal 272, Conservative and Liberal Unionist 271, Irish Nationalists 84, Labour 42, Other 1. Total seats 670.

The Liberal government of H.H. Asquith continued in office as a stable minority administration. Despite strains, both the Irish and Labour members preferred a Liberal government to a Conservative one. This continued to be the case until Asquith formed a Liberal-Conservative-Labour coalition to prosecute the First World War.

1923–1924

1923 United Kingdom general election Conservative 258, Labour 191, Liberal 158, Others 8. Total seats 615.

The 1923 general election led to the defeat of the Conservative government of Stanley Baldwin. The Labour Party of Ramsay MacDonald formed a minority government in January 1924. Although the party with the balance of power (Asquith's Liberals) appeared to be in a very strong position, the Labour leaders made a deliberate decision not to reach any agreement with the Liberals. As the Liberal Party did not want to join forces with the Conservatives and could not afford a quick general election, they were left in the awkward position of having to vote with the government on measures they had not been consulted about.

The Labour government eventually fell when, in a debate about alleged political interference in a decision whether to prosecute a Communist newspaper editor, the Conservative Party abandoned its own motion and voted for a Liberal one which thus passed and caused the resignation of the Labour government.

1929–1931

1929 United Kingdom general election Labour 287, Conservative 260, Liberal 59, Others 9. Total seats 615.

The situation was similar to 1923–1924. However the Labour Party was the largest party in the House of Commons, so the Liberals (now led by David Lloyd George) could abstain without bringing down the new Labour minority government.

As the world economic situation worsened, MacDonald had some discussions with Lloyd George. These led to a government bill to introduce the Australian style alternative vote electoral system. This measure was being obstructed by the Conservative Party and dissident Labour politicians and had not become law before the Labour government fell. A National government was formed, in 1931, with the support of a part of the Labour Party and Conservative and Liberal leaders.

February–October 1974

February 1974 United Kingdom general election Labour 301, Conservative 297, Liberal 14, Others 23. Total seats 635.

This election led to the Conservative government of Edward Heath losing its majority, with Harold Wilson's Labour Party winning four more seats. However no two parties (other than Conservative and Labour) could jointly provide a majority in the House of Commons. The balance of power was held jointly by the Liberals and others (Plaid Cymru and Scottish National Party, with the Northern Irish members)—who were unlikely to act together.

Heath entered into discussions with the Liberal leader Jeremy Thorpe. No agreement was reached, mostly because Heath was not prepared to agree to electoral reform. Also, the Liberals were not keen to support a government which had just lost an election (although it did narrowly win the popular vote). In any event, a Conservative-Liberal coalition would have been a minority government and would have needed the support of the Ulster Unionist Party (which had recently broken with the Conservatives) to command a bare majority of seats.

Heath resigned and Wilson then formed a minority government.

2010–2015

2010 United Kingdom general election Conservative 306, Labour 258, Liberal Democrats 57, Others 29. Total seats 650.

This election led to David Cameron's Conservative Party being the largest party with no majority. The balance of power was held jointly by the Liberal Democrats and others (the Green Party, Plaid Cymru and Scottish National Party, with the Northern Irish members)—who were unlikely to act together.

Labour incumbent Gordon Brown and Cameron announced their intentions to enter discussions with the Lib Dem leader Nick Clegg, open to signing a deal to allow a government to be formed. Having stated before the election that the party with the largest number of seats should have the initial say on forming a government, Clegg announced his intention to begin talks with the Conservative Party. Talks between the Liberal Democrats and Labour were also held, but Brown's continued presence as Prime Minister was seen as a stumbling block to formulating a Labour–Liberal Democrat deal. Thus, Brown announced that he would step down as Labour leader by September 2010. With Labour attempting to form its own coalition government, the Conservatives promised the Liberal Democrats a referendum on changing the voting mechanism to the Alternative Vote (AV) system. In response Labour said that they would introduce AV then hold a referendum asking the public to approve it.

However, by 11 May, the possibility of a Lib–Lab pact was looking unlikely as talks between the Conservatives and Liberal Democrats continued, and after concluding that he would not be able to form a government, Gordon Brown announced his resignation on the evening of 11 May. Cameron became Prime Minister and announced his intention to form a coalition government, the first since the Second World War, with the Liberal Democrats. As one of his first moves, Cameron appointed Nick Clegg as Deputy Prime Minister. Later that day, the two parties jointly published the Conservative – Liberal Democrat Coalition Agreement specifying the terms of the coalition deal.
