= Richard Hooper (Australian politician) =

Australian politician

Richard Hooper (25 January 1846 – 24 July 1909) was an Australian politician who represented the South Australian House of Assembly multi-member seat of Wallaroo from 1891 to 1902.

Hooper was born in Cornwall in England and arrived in South Australia in 1858. He was a miner at Moonta, and became president of the Moonta Amalgamated Miners' Association in 1889. Hooper was the first Labor member of the South Australian House of Assembly, but was not a member of the newly formed United Labor Party, instead serving as an Independent Labor member. He was first elected at the 1891 Wallaroo by-election on 23 May. He was re-elected as an Independent Labor member in 1893, 1896 and 1899; although he attended caucus meetings he never joined the United Labor Party. After his parliamentary career, he moved to Western Australia, where he worked as a nightwatchman and was active in the Labor Party there.
