= Electoral results for the district of Yorke Peninsula =

South Australian district election results

This is a list of election results for the electoral district of Yorke Peninsula in South Australian elections.

== Members for Yorke Peninsula ==
Two members (1884–1902)
Member	Party	Term	Member	Party	Term
William Beaglehole		1884–1887	Robert Caldwell		1884–1890
Harry Bartlett		1887–1896	Robert Caldwell		1884–1890
Harry Bartlett		1887–1896	Henry Lamshed		1890–1893
Harry Bartlett		1887–1896	Arthur Short		1893–1896
John Shannon		1896–1902	William Copley	National League	1896–1902

Two members (1915–1938)
Member	Party	Term	Member	Party	Term
Peter Allen	Liberal Union	1915–1923	Henry Tossell	Liberal Union	1915–1923
Peter Allen	Liberal Federation	1923–1925	Henry Tossell	Liberal Federation	1923–1930
Edward Giles	Liberal Federation	1926–1932	Henry Tossell	Liberal Federation	1923–1930
Edward Giles	Liberal Federation	1926–1932	Baden Pattinson	Liberal Federation	1930–1932
Edward Giles	Liberal and Country	1932–1933	Baden Pattinson	Liberal and Country	1932–1938
Daniel Davies	Independent	1933–1938	Baden Pattinson	Liberal and Country	1932–1938

Single member (1938–1970)
Member	Party	Term
Daniel Davies	Independent	1938–1941
Cecil Hincks	Liberal and Country	1941–1963
James Ferguson	Liberal and Country	1963–1970

== Election results ==
=== Elections in the 1960s ===
1968 South Australian state election: Yorke Peninsula
Party	Candidate	Votes	%	±%
Liberal and Country	James Ferguson	4,651	74.9	+5.4
Labor	Leo Travis	1,563	25.2	−5.4
Total formal votes		6,214	98.4	+0.2
Informal votes		99	1.6	−0.2
Turnout		6,313	96.3	−1.2
Liberal and Country hold		Swing	+5.4	

1965 South Australian state election: Yorke Peninsula
Party	Candidate	Votes	%	±%
Liberal and Country	James Ferguson	4,276	69.5	−30.5
Labor	Michael Kennedy	1,875	30.5	+30.5
Total formal votes		6,151	98.2	
Informal votes		111	1.8	
Turnout		6,262	97.5	
Liberal and Country hold		Swing	N/A	

1962 South Australian state election: Yorke Peninsula
Party	Candidate	Votes	%	±%
Liberal and Country	Cecil Hincks	unopposed		
Liberal and Country hold		Swing		

=== Elections in the 1950s ===
1959 South Australian state election: Yorke Peninsula
Party	Candidate	Votes	%	±%
Liberal and Country	Cecil Hincks	unopposed		
Liberal and Country hold		Swing		

1956 South Australian state election: Yorke Peninsula
Party	Candidate	Votes	%	±%
Liberal and Country	Cecil Hincks	unopposed		
Liberal and Country hold		Swing		

1953 South Australian state election: Yorke Peninsula
Party	Candidate	Votes	%	±%
Liberal and Country	Cecil Hincks	unopposed		
Liberal and Country hold		Swing		

1950 South Australian state election: Yorke Peninsula
Party	Candidate	Votes	%	±%
Liberal and Country	Cecil Hincks	unopposed		
Liberal and Country hold		Swing		

=== Elections in the 1940s ===
1947 South Australian state election: Yorke Peninsula
Party	Candidate	Votes	%	±%
Liberal and Country	Cecil Hincks	unopposed		
Liberal and Country hold		Swing		

1944 South Australian state election: Yorke Peninsula
Party	Candidate	Votes	%	±%
Liberal and Country	Cecil Hincks	unopposed		
Liberal and Country hold		Swing		

1941 South Australian state election: Yorke Peninsula
Party	Candidate	Votes	%	±%
Liberal and Country	Cecil Hincks	2,286	53.9	+10.2
Independent	Daniel Davies	1,365	32.2	−24.1
Labor	Herman Dolling	593	14.0	+14.0
Total formal votes		4,244	99.1	0.0
Informal votes		39	0.9	0.0
Turnout		4,283	65.3	−8.1
Liberal and Country hold		Swing	N/A	

- Preferences were not distributed.

=== Elections in the 1930s ===
1938 South Australian state election: Yorke Peninsula
Party	Candidate	Votes	%	±%
Independent	Daniel Davies	2,725	56.3	
Liberal and Country	Alexander Ferguson	2,114	43.7	
Total formal votes		4,839	99.1	
Informal votes		44	0.9	
Turnout		4,883	73.4	
Independent hold		Swing		
