= Electoral results for the district of Dunstan =

South Australian district election results

This is a list of electoral results for the Electoral district of Dunstan in South Australian state elections.

== Members for Dunstan ==
Member	Party	Term
Steven Marshall	Liberal	2014–2024
Cressida O'Hanlon	Labor	2024–present

== Election results ==
=== Elections in the 2020s ===
==== 2026 ====
2026 South Australian state election: Dunstan
Party	Candidate	Votes	%	±%
Labor	Cressida O'Hanlon	8,823	37.9	+2.7
Liberal	Anna Finizio	6,592	28.3	−18.4
Greens	Christel Mex	3,840	16.5	+2.8
One Nation	Victoria Pollifrone	2,725	11.7	+11.7
Independent	Ian McBryde	443	1.9	+1.9
Animal Justice	Miranda Smith	429	1.8	+1.8
Family First	Fiona Leslie	276	1.2	−3.2
Australian Family	Nick Zollo	94	0.4	+0.4
Fair Go	Ricci Stanley	83	0.4	+0.4
Total formal votes		23,305	96.0	−2.2
Informal votes		974	4.0	+2.2
Turnout		24,279	89.8	+0.1
Two-candidate-preferred result
Labor	Cressida O'Hanlon	13,532	58.1	+8.6
Liberal	Anna Finizio	9,773	41.9	−8.6
Labor notional gain from Liberal		Swing	+8.6	

==== 2024 by-election ====
2024 Dunstan state by-election
Party	Candidate	Votes	%	±%
Liberal	Anna Finizio	9,334	43.5	−3.2
Labor	Cressida O'Hanlon	6,896	32.1	−3.1
Greens	Katie McCusker	4,116	19.2	+5.5
Animal Justice	Frankie Bray	682	3.2	+3.2
Australian Family	Nicole Hissey	440	2.0	+2.0
Total formal votes		21,468	98.1	−0.2
Informal votes		425	1.9	+0.2
Turnout		21,893	80.8	−8.9
Two-party-preferred result
Labor	Cressida O'Hanlon	10,914	50.8	+1.4
Liberal	Anna Finizio	10,554	49.2	−1.4
Labor gain from Liberal		Swing	+1.4	

==== 2022 ====
2022 South Australian state election: Dunstan
Party	Candidate	Votes	%	±%
Liberal	Steven Marshall	11,219	46.7	−2.6
Labor	Cressida O'Hanlon	8,445	35.2	+6.4
Greens	Kay Moncrieff	3,279	13.7	+4.7
Family First	Tony Holloway	1,067	4.4	+4.4
Total formal votes		24,010	98.2	
Informal votes		437	1.8	
Turnout		24,447	89.7	
Two-party-preferred result
Liberal	Steven Marshall	12,135	50.5	−6.9
Labor	Cressida O'Hanlon	11,875	49.5	+6.9
Liberal hold		Swing	−6.9	

Distribution of preferences: Dunstan
Party	Candidate	Votes	Round 1		Round 2	
Party	Candidate	Votes	Dist.	Total	Dist.	Total
Quota (50% + 1)		12,006				
Liberal	Steven Marshall	11,219	+384	11,603	+532	12,135
Labor	Cressida O'Hanlon	8,445	+446	8,891	+2,984	11,875
Greens	Kay Moncrieff	3,279	+237	3,516	Excluded	
Family First	Tony Holloway	1,067	Excluded			

=== Elections in the 2010s ===
==== 2018 ====
2018 South Australian state election: Dunstan
Party	Candidate	Votes	%	±%
Liberal	Steven Marshall	10,517	47.0	−3.4
Labor	Matt Loader	6,514	29.1	−6.6
SA-Best	Jack Noonan	2,901	13.0	+13.0
Greens	Harriet De Kok	1,892	8.4	−2.7
Dignity	Ben Wilson	571	2.5	+0.4
Total formal votes		22,395	97.4	−0.4
Informal votes		599	2.6	+0.4
Turnout		22,994	90.5	+1.1
Two-party-preferred result
Liberal	Steven Marshall	12,566	56.1	+2.5
Labor	Matt Loader	9,829	43.9	−2.5
Liberal hold		Swing	+2.5	

2014 South Australian state election: Dunstan
Party	Candidate	Votes	%	±%
Liberal	Steven Marshall	10,978	50.0	+3.7
Labor	Jo Chapley	7,881	35.9	+2.1
Greens	Michael Donato	2,465	11.2	−0.5
Dignity for Disability	Rick Neagle	624	2.8	+1.0
Total formal votes		21,948	97.8	+1.4
Informal votes		494	2.2	−1.4
Turnout		22,442	91.3	−0.4
Two-party-preferred result
Liberal	Steven Marshall	11,656	53.1	−1.7
Labor	Jo Chapley	10,292	46.9	+1.7
Liberal hold		Swing	−1.7	

== See also ==
- Electoral results for the district of Norwood
