= Arthur Ernest William Short =

Australian politician

Arthur Ernest William Short (24 October 1888 – 19 July 1949) was a prominent South Australian businessman and city councillor, who died within three weeks of being elected Lord Mayor of Adelaide.

Short was born in Maitland, Yorke Peninsula, the only son of Arthur Short, member for Yorke Peninsula in the South Australian House of Assembly from 1893 to 1896.

He was founder and managing director of Adelaide paper merchants Woolcott, Short & Co., which had premises off King William Street. In 1934 they moved to 13–19 Anster Street, off Waymouth Street, and shortly afterwards became A. E. W. Short Pty. Limited. He was a prominent Rotarian – twice President of Adelaide Rotary Club, District Governor for South Australia (District 65) 1935–1936, and Governor of Rotary International.

He was a longtime supporter and member of the management committee of the Somerton Crippled Children's Home, vice-president of The Crippled Children's Association of South Australia, and a member of the Kangaroo Club administration committee. (The Kangaroo Club (1931-c. 1955) was an initiative of radio station 5AD, and raised funds for children's charities.)

He was councillor for Gawler ward in the Adelaide City Council for nine years, serving on several committees then, as the endorsed LCL candidate, elected Lord Mayor on 2 July 1949 when he defeated C. W. Lloyd. He died of peritonitis at Wakefield Street Private Hospital after being suddenly taken ill at his Unley Park home.

== Family ==
Ernest Short married Viola Warren on 28 October 1914. They had one daughter and a son, Max Cameron Short (29 September 1922 – 1 June 1944), who was killed while serving as Flying Officer with 454 Squadron, RAAF in the Middle East during World War II.
