= Scosa =

scosa
- Merged into: Novita
- Founded: 1950
- Type: Incorporated
- Headquarters: Woodville, South Australia
- Region served: South Australia
- Affiliations: National Disability Services, Cerebral Palsy Australia
- Website: http://www.scosa.com.au/

scosa (the Spastic Centres of South Australia Inc.) was a South Australian organisation providing a range of supports to children and adults with disabilities. Initially it focused on people with cerebral palsy. In August 2019, it was announced that scosa was to merge into Novita.

== History ==
scosa had its beginnings in the efforts of parents of children with cerebral palsy.

In 1946, Norman Taylor, the then-president of The Crippled Children's Association of South Australia (now known as Novita Children's Services), invited Daphne Gum to return to Adelaide to establish a centre for the care of children with cerebral palsy. Gum was the Director of the Spastic Centre ("The Centre") was established in the then Adelaide Children's Hospital, officially opening on 6 March 1946. The Centre used one room in the first-floor Outpatients' Department. As the lifts were old and unreliable, at times pupils were carried up and down the stairs. On 3 November 1949 the Centre moved to a prefabricated building of three rooms which had been purchased in Kermode Street, North Adelaide.

scosa was incorporated on 18 April 1950 as the South Australian Spastic Paralysis Welfare Association Inc.

scoca established a home (opened 29 November 1952) and school at Woodville and also provided other services including: speech pathology; physiotherapy; occupational therapy; medical services; splint making; accommodation; with palliative care and a nursing home services.

From 1995 the Government of South Australia Department of Education took on the responsibility for children with disabilities and deinstitutionalisation led residents of institutional accommodation into the community, with CARA (Community Accommodation and Respite Agency Inc).

== Miss South Australia and Miss Australia ==
The Miss South Australia Quest was run by Spastic Centres of South Australia Inc. which as a member of The Spastic Centres of Australia ran the Miss Australia Quest/Awards for 45 years from 1954 to 2000. Over its duration entrants, their families, committees, sponsors and the general public of Australia raised in excess of A$87 million.

== See also ==
- Cerebral Palsy Alliance (NSW)
