= 2024 Dunstan state by-election =

State by-election in South Australia

- 23 March 2024

Electoral district of Dunstan in the South Australian House of Assembly
- Turnout: 24,447 (80.8% ▼8.9)
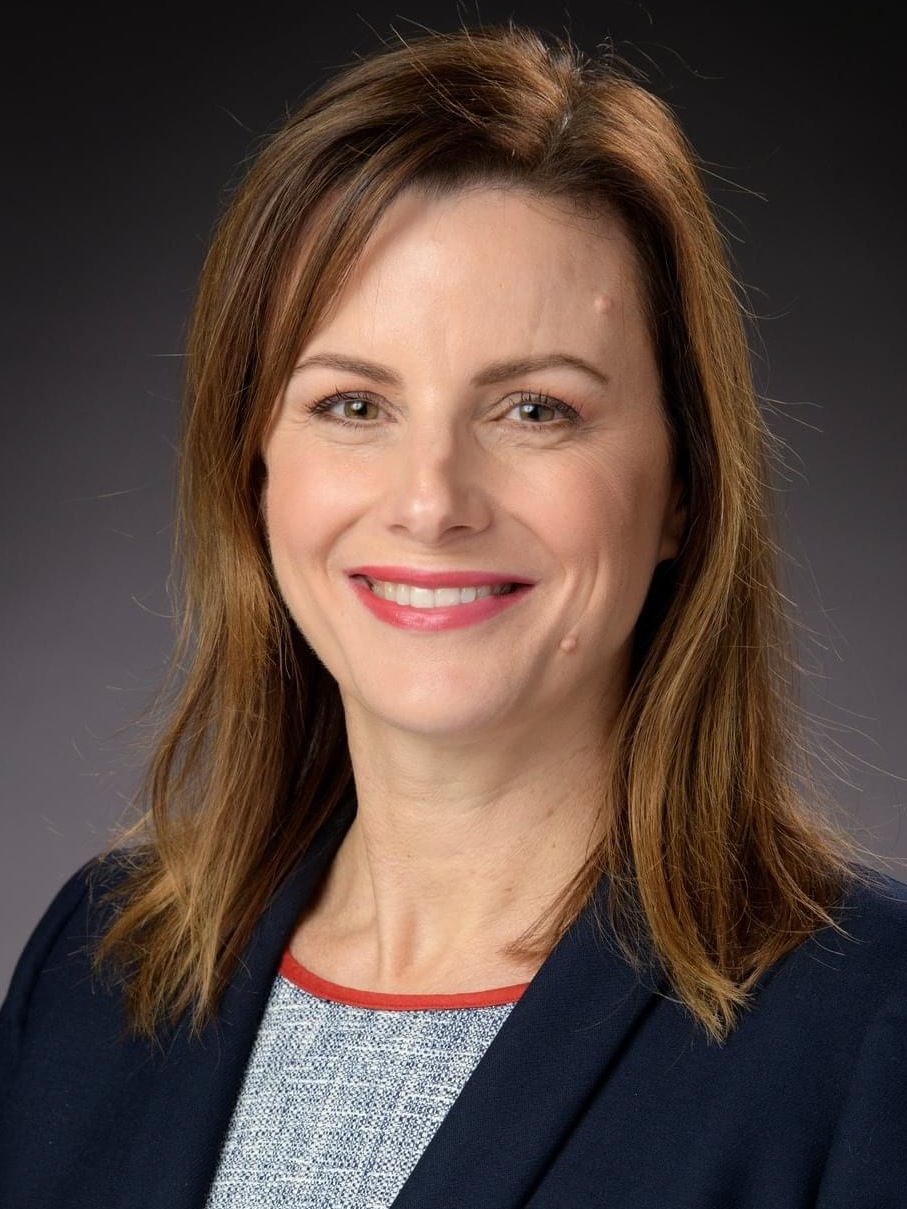

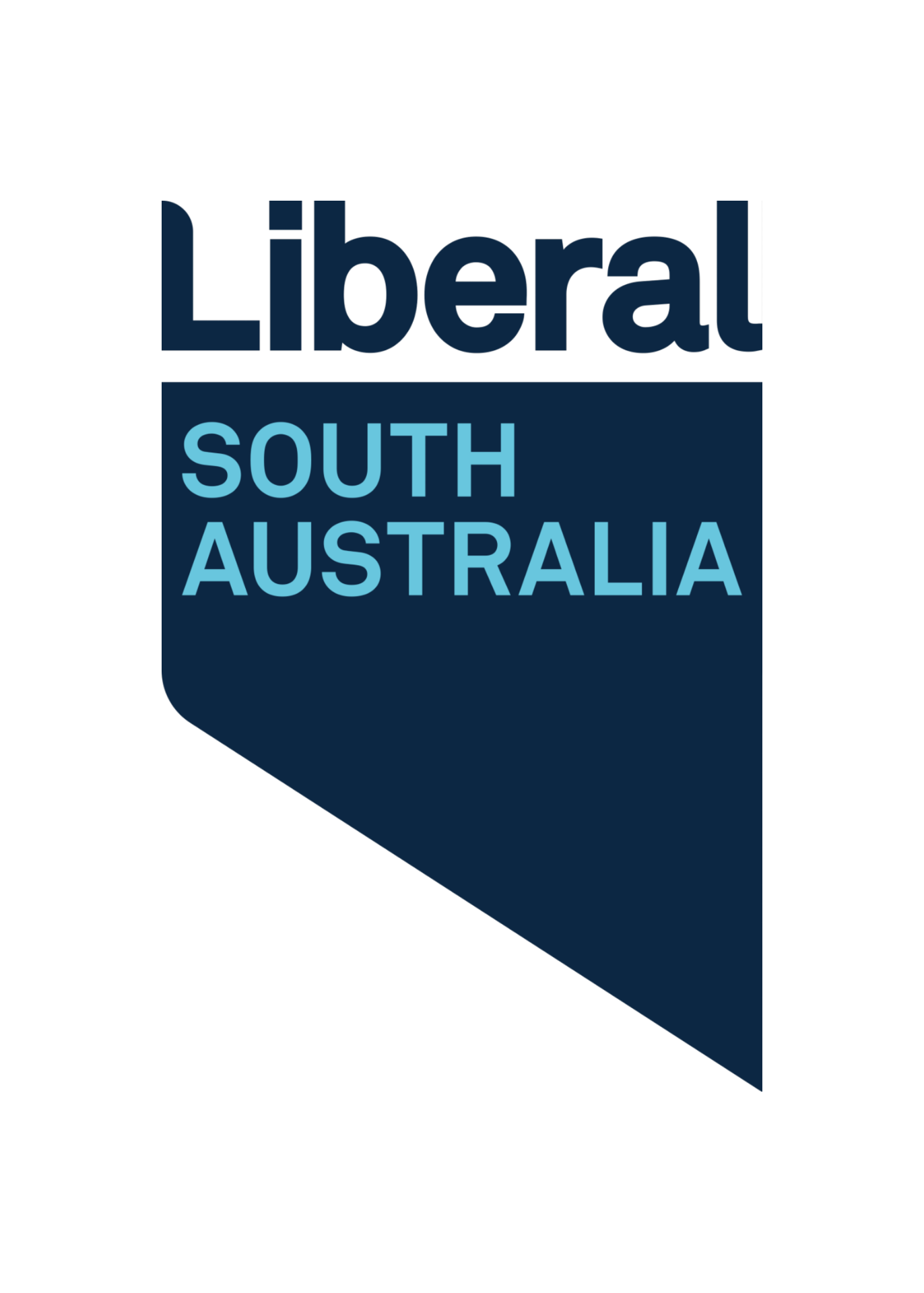

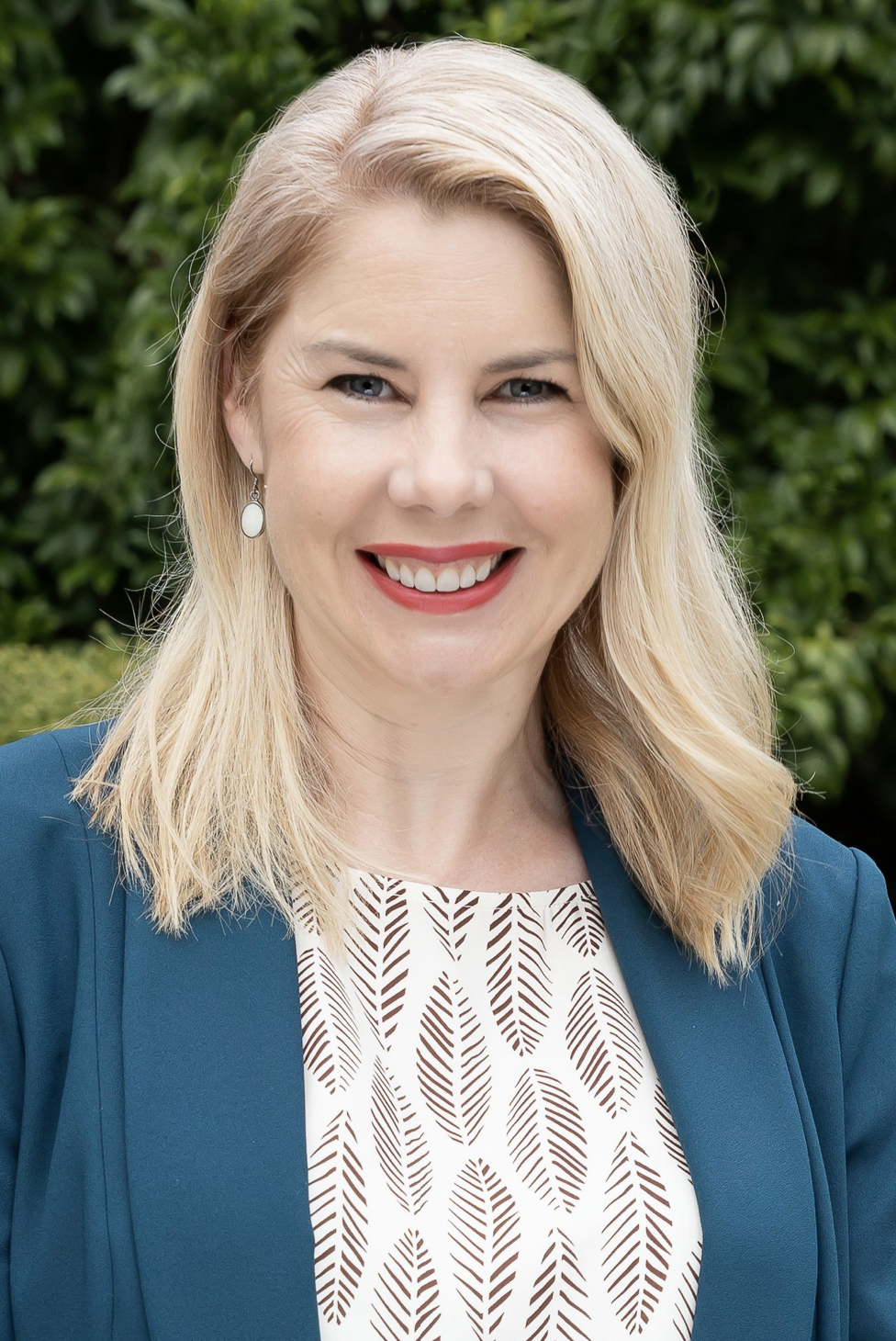
| | First party | Second party | Third party |
|---|---|---|---|
| Candidate | Cressida O'Hanlon | Anna Finizio | Katie McCusker |
| Party | Labor | Liberal | Greens |
| Popular vote | 6,896 | 9,334 | 4,116 |
| Percentage | 32.1% | 43.5% | 19.2% |
| Swing | ▼3.1 | ▼3.2 | ▲5.5 |
| TPP | 50.8% | 49.2% |
| TPP swing | ▲1.4 | ▼1.4 |
- The electoral district of Dunstan (highlighted in green) in the greater Adelaide area.
MP before election
Steven Marshall
Liberal
Elected MP
Cressida O'Hanlon
Labor

A by-election for the seat of Dunstan in the South Australian House of Assembly was held on 23 March 2024, following the resignation of incumbent member and former premier Steven Marshall, which was announced on 24 January 2024.

Labor candidate Cressida O'Hanlon, who challenged Marshall for the seat two years earlier, was elected the new member, defeating Liberal candidate Anna Finizio. O'Hanlon is the first Labor member to represent the seat in its present incarnation; it was created in 2014 as a reconfiguration of Norwood, the seat of former Labor premier Don Dunstan. She is only the second member other than Marshall to have represented the seat since then. It is the first instance of a governing party gaining a seat in a by-election from the Opposition in South Australia in over a century.

== Background ==
The by-election was triggered by the resignation of sitting Liberal MP and former premier Steven Marshall.

Dunstan is considered an ultra-marginal seat, sitting on a 0.5% margin. Indeed, at the 2022 state election, when Marshall's Liberal government unsuccessfully sought a second term (but were defeated in a landslide), Marshall suffered a nearly seven percent swing, and O'Hanlon narrowly missed taking the seat off the Liberals. When all preferences were distributed, Marshall came within 260 votes of losing his own seat.

=== 2022 result ===
2022 South Australian state election: Dunstan
| Party | Candidate | Votes | % | ±% |
|---|---|---|---|---|
| Liberal | Steven Marshall | 11,219 | 46.7 | −2.6 |
| Labor | Cressida O'Hanlon | 8,445 | 35.2 | +6.4 |
| Greens | Kay Moncrieff | 3,279 | 13.7 | +4.7 |
| Family First | Tony Holloway | 1,067 | 4.4 | +4.4 |
| Total formal votes | | 24,010 | 98.2 | |
| Informal votes | | 437 | 1.8 | |
| Turnout | | 24,447 | 89.7 | |
Two-party-preferred result
| Liberal | Steven Marshall | 12,135 | 50.5 | −6.9 |
| Labor | Cressida O'Hanlon | 11,875 | 49.5 | +6.9 |
| Liberal hold | | Swing | −6.9 | |

Distribution of preferences: Dunstan
| Party | Candidate | Votes | Round 1 | | Round 2 | |
| Party | Candidate | Votes | Dist. | Total | Dist. | Total |
|---|---|---|---|---|---|---|
| Quota (50% + 1) | | 12,006 | | | | |
| Liberal | Steven Marshall | 11,219 | +384 | 11,603 | +532 | 12,135 |
| Labor | Cressida O'Hanlon | 8,445 | +446 | 8,891 | +2,984 | 11,875 |
| Greens | Kay Moncrieff | 3,279 | +237 | 3,516 | Excluded | |
| Family First | Tony Holloway | 1,067 | Excluded | | | |

== Candidates ==
List of candidates as they appear on the ballot order.

- Frankie Bray (Animal Justice Party)
- Cressida O'Hanlon (Labor)
- Katie McCusker (Greens)
- Anna Finizio (Liberal)
- Nicole Hussey (Australian Family Party)

== Results ==
2024 Dunstan state by-election
| Party | Candidate | Votes | % | ±% |
|---|---|---|---|---|
| Liberal | Anna Finizio | 9,334 | 43.5 | −3.2 |
| Labor | Cressida O'Hanlon | 6,896 | 32.1 | −3.1 |
| Greens | Katie McCusker | 4,116 | 19.2 | +5.5 |
| Animal Justice | Frankie Bray | 682 | 3.2 | +3.2 |
| Australian Family | Nicole Hissey | 440 | 2.0 | +2.0 |
| Total formal votes | | 21,468 | 98.1 | −0.2 |
| Informal votes | | 425 | 1.9 | +0.2 |
| Turnout | | 21,893 | 80.8 | −8.9 |
Two-party-preferred result
| Labor | Cressida O'Hanlon | 10,914 | 50.8 | +1.4 |
| Liberal | Anna Finizio | 10,554 | 49.2 | −1.4 |
| Labor gain from Liberal | | Swing | +1.4 | |

== See also ==
- List of South Australian House of Assembly by-elections
