= Daphne Lorraine Gum =

Australian educator and activist (1917-2017)

- Born: 24 January 1916; Pinnaroo, South Australia
- Died: 28 February 2017 (aged 101); Australia
- Occupation: Educator
- Parent(s): Cecil William Gum and Ruby Annie (née McKenzie) Gum

Daphne Lorraine Gum MBE, OA (24 January 1916 – 28 February 2017) was an Australian pioneer in the care and education of children with cerebral palsy.

== Early life and education ==
Daphne Lorraine Gum was born to Cecil and Ruby Gum on 24 January 1916 in the Pinnaroo Hospital; Pinnaroo, South Australia. Her grandfather and father owned farming lands in Pinnaroo.

In 1919, she moved with her parents and elder sister Marjorie to the township of Crystal Brook, where Marjorie and Daphne commenced school. Gum's younger siblings Betty Christina ("Chris"), Donald and Denise were born at the Crystal Brook Hospital. In 1927, the family moved to North Unley, a suburb of Adelaide. Gum and her sister Chris attended a private school, Fairford House.

After passing the Qualifying Certificate Examination of Grade 7, Gum entered the Methodist Ladies College (which became Annesley College in 1977). As a result of The Great Depression, and the death of Ruby in 1931, most of the family moved to the farming property at Pinnaroo, while Gum remained in Adelaide. In 1933 Gum commenced her three-year kindergarten and primary school teaching training at the Methodist Ladies College.

== Early career ==
In February 1936, after graduation, Gum commenced in a single teacher position with a family at the Tapio Subsidised School, in the Broken Hill Inspectorate of the New South Wales Education Department. She commenced with three students from the Barnfield family of the Tapio Station. They were later joined by another student. In 1942, she took up a position as a teacher in residence at Woodlands Church of England Girls' Grammar School, working with both the kindergarten and lower school.

Partly due to her late mother having had poliomyelitis (or infantile paralysis, as it was then known), Gum was interested in working with sick or disadvantaged children. In 1945, she commenced employment at the Spastic Centre at the Royal Children's Hospital in Melbourne, Victoria. There Gum worked with children with cerebral palsy, attending the weekly clinics of Dame Jean Macnamara, a specialist in the treatment and care of children with cerebral palsy. During her tenure in Melbourne, Gum resided in the Presbyterian Ladies' College boarding house in East Melbourne.

In 1946, at the request of Mr Norman Taylor, the then president of The Crippled Children's Association of South Australia (now known as Novita Children's Services), Gum returned to Adelaide to establish a centre for the care of children with cerebral palsy, becoming the Director of the Spastic Centre.

In Adelaide, she returned to Woodlands Church of England Girls' Grammar School in residence, again taking charge of the Junior Boarding House in the evenings, while devoting her days to her new work. "The Centre", as it was then known, was established in the then Adelaide Children's Hospital, officially opening on 6 March 1946. The Centre used one room in the first-floor Outpatients' Department.

In 1948 Gum left Woodlands: taking up residence nearer to the Adelaide Children's Hospital and concentrating wholly on her work for The Crippled Children's Association of South Australia. On 3 November 1949, the Centre moved to a prefabricated building of three rooms which had been purchased in Kermode Street, North Adelaide.

== Ashford House ==
The Centre remained in North Adelaide until 1951, when The Crippled Children's Association of South Australia purchased Ashford House and its property of one and one half acres on Anzac Highway, Ashford with assistance from the South Australian government. The buildings at Kermode Street were dismantled and rebuilt in the grounds of Ashford House. In 1955, Gum took twelve months leave of absence to study and to visit relevant schools and centres overseas.

Around 1956, the school was renamed Ashford House School for Cerebral Palsied Children. School colours of green and silver (green and grey for school uniforms) were chosen. The school motto, "Animo et Fide", meaning 'with Courage and Faith" was worked into a school badge. House names – Schweitzer, Wilberforce, Shaftesbury, Flynn, Sturt and Nightingale – were employed instead of grades.

The dismantled and rebuilt prefabricated buildings remained The Ashford Spastic Centre until 1960, when the proceeds of a Channel Nine television telethon were donated to the Spastic Centre. This support, with a government subsidy, was used to build a permanent school, the first sod being turned on 7 July 1961.

In 1960 the Ashford House Activity Centre – a therapeutic learning centre for teenagers and young adults, planned by the medical director, Dr Ralph Horton – had been built and was opened by the then premier, Sir Thomas Playford. In September 1966 Gum attended the Tenth World Congress of the International Society for Rehabilitation of the Disabled in Wiesbaden, Germany; also touring facilities in other countries. In August 1968, Gum resigned her position.

== New Guinea ==
Due to her interest in the children of New Guinea, Gum was appointed to work in the Methodist Overseas Mission school in Raluana, New Britain, New Guinea. In the following year she was appointed to the school at Halis, New Ireland, New Guinea, where she worked with three New Guinean teachers and one trainee student in the village two miles away. In English lessons in New Guinea, Gum used the "Words in Colour" reading charts which she and others had pioneered at the Ashford Centre.

Around 1971, Gum was asked by Miss Ruth Watts, headmistress of the Methodist Ladies College, to take on a temporary position at the school. The position became permanent and Ms Gum again used the pioneering "Words in Colour" system. In 1975, at the age of 60 years, Gum completed her last years as a teacher with a double Grade 7 group in a large open classroom, term-teaching with two other teachers.

== Post-retirement ==
In 1975, Gum returned to New Guinea to share the "One Hundred Years in the Islands" celebration. From 1976, she pursued various interests including chess, sketching, the Methodist Ladies' College Old Scholar's Association committee (including a time as president during 1979–80), university lectures, a world tour and time spent in Guatemala, Honduras and El Salvador with her nephew, Geoff Renner, Director of World Vision in the Latin American Countries of Central and South America.

Gum became involved in the work of Marjorie Black House on King William Road, Unley, a voluntary organisation meeting place and support center for people with mental health issues. In 1982, Gum became chair and coordinator of the work of Marjorie Black House, when it was threatened with closure. Gum's Tuesday Club, the last of the Marjorie Black clubs to close, held its final gathering on 16 August 2005. She participated in the transfer of the building to the South Australian Council of Social Service. Since the early 1970s she participated in the collection of and care of the college memorabilia at the Library Historical Centre at Annesley College.

On 27 May 2013, Gum attended the unveiling ceremony of the Daphne Gum Playground at the Annesley Junior School. Until 2015, she lived independently, close to Ashford House, which is now a school for children with autism. On 24 January 2016, she celebrated her 100th birthday with family and friends. Gum died in February 2017 at the age of 101.

== Publications ==
- The Intriguing Origins of Ashford House (1995)
- The Old Gum Tree at Ashford
- A Rich Tapestry of Lives: Celebrating the 90th birthday of the Methodist Ladies college/Annesley College Old Scholars Association (1995)

== Former Students ==
Gum's former students include Brenton, whose reunion with Gum in 2010 featured in the South Australian television program, Postcards. Her students also included Michael Wooley (awarded the 2005 Distinguished Service Medal by CP Australia), and the late John Hickman, PhD whom Gum helped overcome profound cerebral palsy to obtain a PhD and a research post at Australian National University.

== Honours ==
In 1960 Gum became a Member of the Order of the British Empire (MBE) in recognition of her work with children affected by cerebral palsy. In 1966 Gum was awarded the Order of Australia Medal for her services to education and in helping children with cerebral palsy.
