= Steven Marshall =

Premier of South Australia from 2018 to 2022

The Honourable Steven Marshall AO
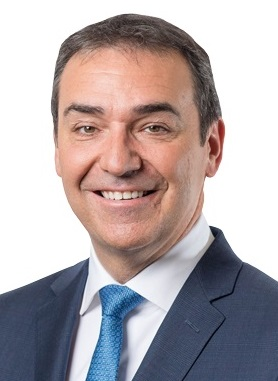
- Marshall in 2018

46th Premier of South Australia
- In office 19 March 2018 – 21 March 2022
- Monarch: Elizabeth II
- Governor: Hieu Van Le; Frances Adamson
- Deputy: Vickie Chapman; Dan van Holst Pellekaan
- Preceded by: Jay Weatherill
- Succeeded by: Peter Malinauskas

Leader of the Opposition in South Australia
- In office 4 February 2013 – 19 March 2018
- Preceded by: Isobel Redmond
- Succeeded by: Peter Malinauskas

Leader of the South Australian Liberal Party
- In office 4 February 2013 – 19 April 2022
- Deputy: Vickie Chapman; Dan van Holst Pellekaan
- Preceded by: Isobel Redmond
- Succeeded by: David Speirs

Deputy Leader of the South Australian Liberal Party
- In office 23 October 2012 – 4 February 2013
- Leader: Isobel Redmond
- Preceded by: Mitch Williams
- Succeeded by: Vickie Chapman

Member of the South Australian Parliament for Dunstan
- In office 15 March 2014 – 6 February 2024
- Preceded by: District established
- Succeeded by: Cressida O'Hanlon

Member of the South Australian Parliament for Norwood
- In office 20 March 2010 – 15 March 2014
- Preceded by: Vini Ciccarello
- Succeeded by: District abolished

Personal details
- Born: Steven Spence Marshall; 21 January 1968 (age 58) Woodville South, South Australia
- Party: Liberal Party of Australia (SA)
- Spouse: Sue (divorced)
- Children: 2
- Education: Ethelton Primary School; Immanuel College
- Alma mater: Adelaide University; Durham University (MBA)
- Profession: Businessperson
- Website: stevenmarshall.com.au

Steven Spence Marshall AO (born 21 January 1968) is a former Australian politician who served as the 46th premier of South Australia between 2018 and 2022. He was a member of the South Australian Division of the Liberal Party of Australia in the South Australian House of Assembly from 2010 until 2024, representing the electorate of Dunstan (known as Norwood before 2014).

Marshall became the leader of the South Australian Liberal Party in February 2013, and was the leader of the opposition between 2013 and 2018. He had previously been the party's deputy leader from October 2012 to February 2013. Initially unsuccessful at the 2014 state election, Marshall led the opposition into government at the 2018 state election and on 19 March was sworn in as Premier by the governor. His government was defeated at the 2022 state election, and Marshall's premiership ended on 21 March. Following the defeat, he announced his resignation as party leader, which took effect upon the party's election of David Speirs as new leader on 19 April 2022. Marshall resigned from Parliament in February 2024.

== Early life and education ==
Marshall was born in Woodville South, a suburb of Adelaide, South Australia. He attended Ethelton Primary School and Immanuel College, before studying business at the South Australian Institute of Technology (now Adelaide University). He completed an MBA at Durham University in the United Kingdom.

== Early career in business ==
In 1997, his father retired from running the family business, Marshall Furniture, and Steven Marshall took on the role of managing director. While acting as managing director, the company won the South Australian small business prize in the national 2001 Employer of the Year awards, due to the company's commitment to hire people with disabilities. He continued running the firm until 2001, when mounting pressure from imports forced the family to sell the business to Steinhoff International. This led to a role on the Steinhoff Asia-Pacific board, which he then left in order to take on a number of different positions in the South Australian business sector, including chairman of Jeffries Soils and general manager of Michell Pty Ltd.

Marshall served on the South Australian Manufacturing Industry Advisory Board prior to entering politics in 2010.

== Politics ==
Marshall joined the Liberal Party in 2007. Marshall entered South Australian Parliament at the 2010 state election, winning the seat of Norwood as a candidate for the South Australian Division of the Liberal Party of Australia. He defeated Labor incumbent Vini Ciccarello. In December 2011, Opposition Leader Isobel Redmond promoted Marshall to the front bench, assigning him the shadow portfolios of industry and trade, defence industries, small business, science and information economy, environment and conservation, sustainability and climate change.

Marshall said in August 2012 that he would be willing to sign a pledge that he would not challenge Redmond for the Liberal Party leadership or Mitch Williams for the deputy leadership. On 19 October 2012, Martin Hamilton-Smith and Marshall declared a leadership spill against Redmond and Williams. In a partyroom ballot occurred on 23 October 2012, Redmond retained the leadership by one vote; however, Marshall was elected to the deputy leadership. Marshall was denied his preferred treasury portfolio by Redmond, but instead was given the health and economic development portfolios, while retaining his roles in industry and trade, defence, small business and science.

=== Leader of the Opposition ===
On 31 January 2013 after Redmond resigned as Leader of the Opposition and Leader of the SA Liberals, it was speculated that Marshall would succeed her. At the ballot on 4 February 2013, Marshall was elected unopposed.

=== 2014 state election ===
The 2014 state election was held on 15 March. Marshall contested Dunstan, a reconfigured version of Norwood. He faced Labor leader Jay Weatherill, who had replaced Mike Rann in 2011. Leading up to the election, the SA Liberals had led Labor in every recorded Newspoll since 2009. The election resulted in a hung parliament with 23 seats for Labor and 22 for the Liberals with the Liberals winning a majority of the two party preferred vote. The balance of power then rested with the two crossbench independents, Bob Such and Geoff Brock. Such did not indicate who he would support in a minority government before he went on medical leave for a brain tumour, diagnosed one week after the election. With 24 seats required to govern, Brock provided support to the incumbent Labor government, allowing Weatherill to continue in office as head of a minority government, with Brock given a ministry portfolio.

The day before the election, Marshall made a political gaffe, saying by mistake "If people in South Australia want change, they want a better future, they want to grow our economy then they need to vote Labor tomorrow". Marshall contested Dunstan, essentially a renamed version of Norwood, and suffered a 1.7% two-party (2PP) swing. A swing against the Liberals occurred in seven of the nine Liberal-retained metropolitan seats.^{a}

After the election, Marshall continued to lead the Liberals in opposition. Former Liberal leader Martin Hamilton-Smith became an independent two months after the election and indicated his support for the government. Following the death of Such and the subsequent 2014 Fisher by-election which Labor won by five votes from a 7.3% 2PP swing away from the Liberals, Labor went from minority to majority government. Brock and Hamilton-Smith maintained their confidence and supply support for the government which provided a 26 to 21 parliamentary majority.

=== 2018 state election ===
The 2018 state election was held on 17 March. The July to September 2014 Newspoll had seen Labor begin to lead the Liberals on the two-party-preferred vote for the first time since 2009. The October to December 2015 Newspoll saw Marshall's leadership approval rating drop 11 points to 30%, the equal lowest Newspoll approval rating in history for a South Australian Opposition Leader since Dale Baker in 1990. At the election, Marshall again faced Weatherill and Labor which were seeking a record fifth term in office and the "wild card" centrist party, SA-Best, led by former Senator Nick Xenophon, who was seeking the balance of power in the Assembly. The 2016 electoral redistribution had given the Liberals an advantage of 27 seats to Labor's 20 seats heading into the election.

Four hours after the close of polls on election day, at approximately 10pm ACDST, Weatherill telephoned Steven Marshall and conceded defeat. Marshall was introduced to the election day function by former Liberal Premier John Olsen and claimed victory. The SA Liberals had won the election with 25 seats to Labor's 19, a bare majority of two – the first time the Liberals had won a state election since Olsen's victory in 1997.

=== Premier of South Australia ===
Two days after the election, with the result beyond doubt even though counting was still under way, Marshall had himself, deputy leader Vickie Chapman, and Father of the South Australian Parliament Rob Lucas sworn in as an interim three-person government by the Governor of South Australia, Hieu Van Le. Marshall became Premier, Chapman Deputy Premier and Attorney-General, and Lucas Treasurer. Lucas had previously served as Treasurer in the last Liberal government. The full ministry was sworn in on 22 March. In addition to serving as Premier, Marshall retained responsibility for portfolio areas of The Arts, Aboriginal Affairs and Reconciliation, Defence and Space Industries, Veterans' Affairs and Multicultural Affairs, although these were no longer named as ministries.

In late 2018, Arts South Australia was dismantled and its functions transferred to direct oversight by the Department of the Premier and Cabinet. On 11 January 2020, Marshall assumed the responsibilities of the Tourism ministry when he relieved David Ridgway of the role in the immediate aftermath of the devastation of key South Australian tourist areas during the 2019–20 bushfires.

Marshall led his government into the 2022 state election, becoming only the second Liberal Premier since the end of the Playmander to serve a full term and take the party into the next election. At that election, the Liberals were heavily defeated on a swing of over six percent. Marshall himself was nearly defeated in his own seat of Dunstan. A redistribution had seemingly made Dunstan safer for him by boosting his majority to 7.1 percent, just over the threshold of fairly safe. However, he was nearly defeated by Labor challenger Cressida O'Hanlon, suffering a swing of almost seven percent. Marshall would have lost had 260 Green voters preferenced O'Hanlon over him. This left Dunstan as the most marginal seat in the chamber, with Marshall now sitting on a paper-thin majority of 0.5 percent. His premiership formally ended on 21 March when the new cabinet led by Peter Malinauskas was sworn in at Government House.

The day after the election Marshall announced his resignation as party leader, which took effect on 19 April 2022 when the party room elected former Environment Minister David Speirs his successor on 19 April 2022. He remained as a backbencher until resigning from state parliament in February 2024. O'Hanlon took the seat for Labor at the ensuing by-election.

== Other roles ==
As of 2017, he was an ambassador for scosa, having previously served on the board for five years. He was a board member for Reconciliation SA for some years and has been a White Ribbon ambassador. He is the founding chairman of Compost for Soils, a program started in South Australia that has subsequently been implemented nationally.

In November 2023, Marshall took up a position with the US nonprofit contractor Mitre Corporation.

As of January 2026, he was living in New York, and serving as president of the American Australian Association. The association was established by Keith Murdoch in 1948 as a private nonprofit organisation "dedicated to broadening, strengthening and developing ties across the Pacific", and sponsors the United States Studies Centre at the University of Sydney.

== Recognition and honours ==
In 2001, Marshall received a Centenary of Federation Medal for services to the disability sector.

He was appointed as an Officer of the Order of Australia (AO) in the 2026 Australia Day Honours for "distinguished service to the people and Parliament of South Australia, to business, to people with disability, and to governance and board positions".

== Personal life ==
Marshall has lived in the Dunstan electorate for his entire adult life.

Marshall is divorced and has two adult children. In January 2022, he had to isolate for a week due to having had dinner with his daughter just before she tested positive to COVID-19.

Marshall grew up a supporter of the Port Adelaide Football Club, and supports Norwood Football Club in the local competition.

== See also ==
- 2022 South Australian state election

== Notes ==
^a: Per Results of the South Australian state election, 2014 (House of Assembly), a swing against the Liberals occurred in seven of the nine Liberal-retained metropolitan seats despite the statewide swing – in Dunstan, Adelaide, Unley, Bragg, Heysen, Waite, Davenport.

Political offices
| Preceded by Mitch Williams | Deputy Leader of the Opposition in South Australia; 2012–2013 | Succeeded by Vickie Chapman |
| Preceded by Isobel Redmond | Leader of the Opposition of South Australia; 2013–2018 | Succeeded by Peter Malinauskas |
| Preceded by Jay Weatherill | Premier of South Australia; 2018–2022 | Succeeded by Peter Malinauskas |
| Preceded by Peter Malinauskas | Leader of the Opposition of South Australia; 2022 | Succeeded by David Speirs |
South Australian House of Assembly
| Preceded by Vini Ciccarello | Member for Norwood; 2010–2014 | District abolished |
| District created | Member for Dunstan; 2014–2024 | Succeeded by Cressida O'Hanlon |
Party political offices
| Preceded by Isobel Redmond | Leader of the Liberal Party of Australia (South Australian Division); 2013–2022 | Succeeded by David Speirs |
