= Novita Services =

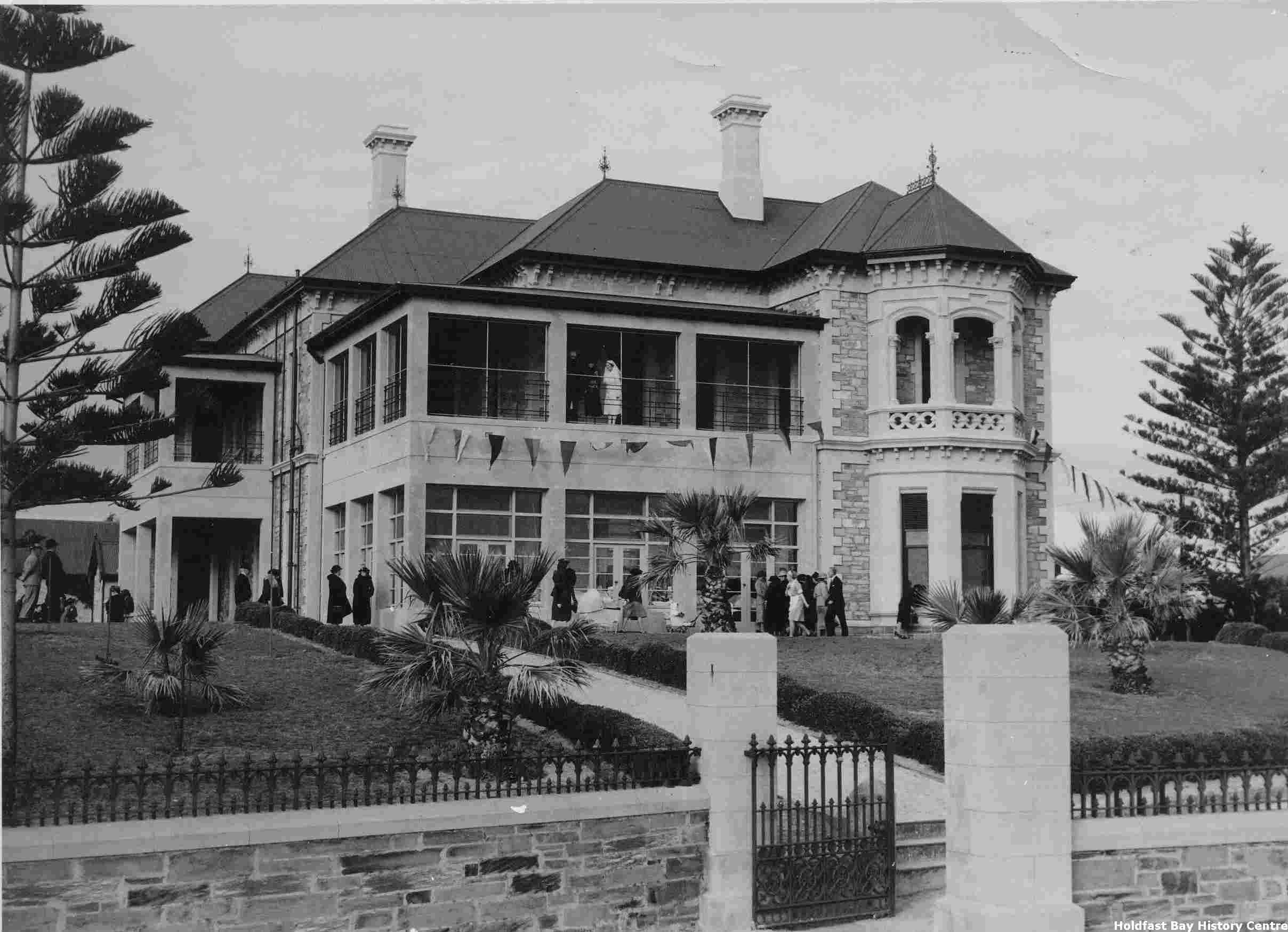
- Predecessor: Crippled Children's Association of South Australia, Inc
- Founded: 1939
- Type: Incorporated
- Registration no.: ABN 137 537 636 Novita Services
- Headquarters: 341 Port Road, Hindmarsh, South Australia 5007
- Location(s): Children's Services: Hindmarsh, Parafield Gardens, St Marys and Elizabeth, Whyalla; with services also provided throughout regional South Australia plus Broken Hill, New South Wales.
- Region served: South Australia, Broken Hill, New South Wales
- Affiliations: National Disability Services
- Website: https://www.novita.org.au/

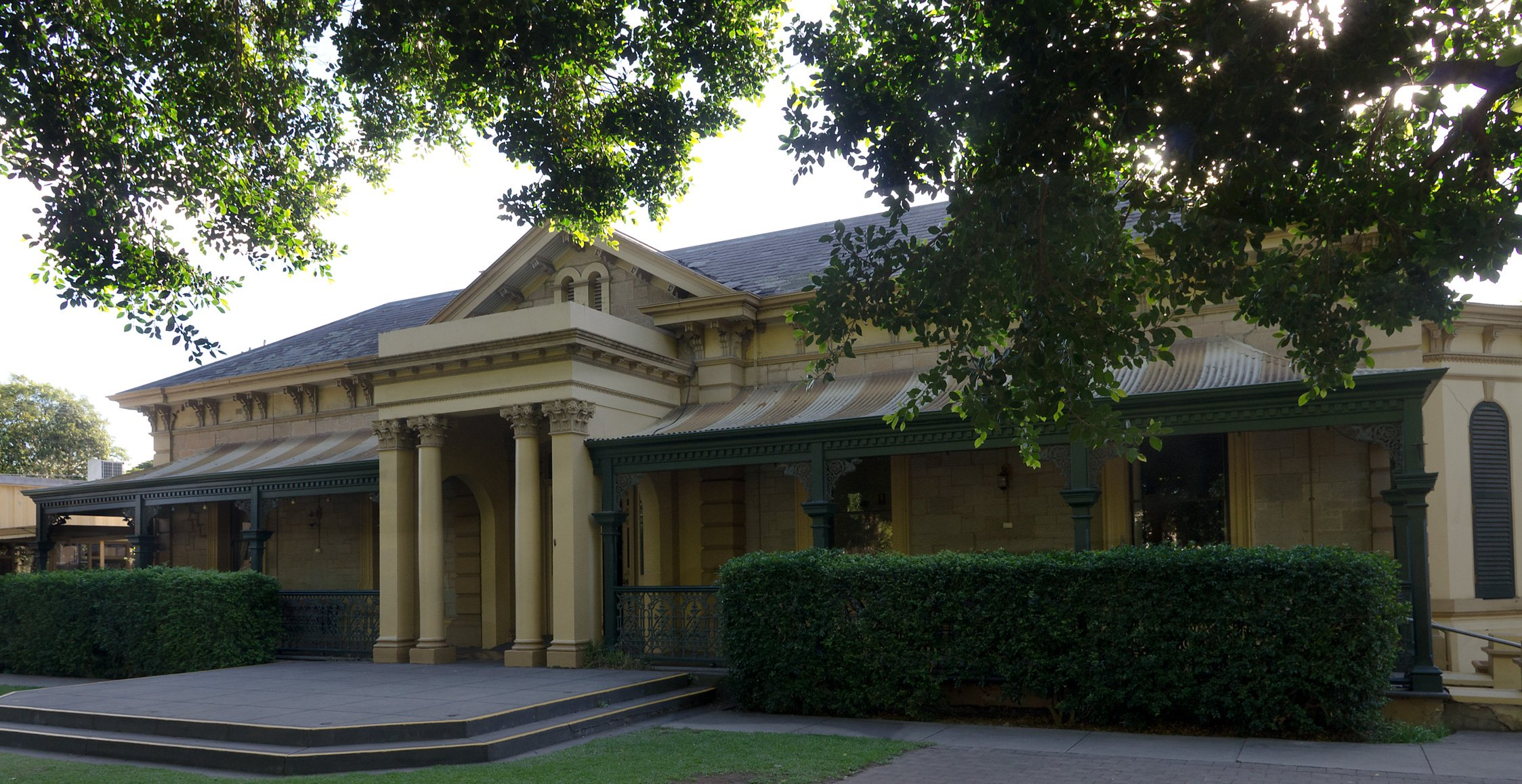
Ashford House in Adelaide, South Australia

Novita is a South Australian disability organisation, providing support, services and equipment to children, teens and adults living with disability, their families and carers. In August 2019, it was announced that scosa was to merge into Novita.

== History ==
The Crippled Children's Association of South Australia (CCA) origins lay in the Crippled Children's Committee formed in 1932, an inaugural meeting of the CCA was held the on 13 December 1938 and it was incorporated in 1939 and operated as the Somerton Crippled Children's Home. The name was changed to Novita Children's Services in 2004.

It originally focused on supporting children with poliomyelitis, expanding to support those with cerebral palsy by 1944, and now works with children with a broad range of needs. With the current emphasis on community based care and deinstitutionalisation, Novita Children's Services stopped providing institutional care at Regency Park in 1993, working with children and families in locally based centres and in community settings. It also provides support under the National Disability Insurance Scheme (NDIS).

Initially relying on public and South Australian Government support the CCA ran the Somerton Crippled Children's Home from 1939, and the Ashford House School, both to 1976. Both accommodation services and the school then moved Regency Park Centre for the Young Disabled.

In 2019, Novita merged with scosa and their headquarters relocated in 2020 to a new facility at Hindmarsh.

== People ==
- Russell Ebert
- Daphne Lorraine Gum
- Roland Ellis Jacobs
- Kevin Scarce
- Arthur Ernest William Short
