= Everard Park, South Australia =

Everard Park
- Suburb
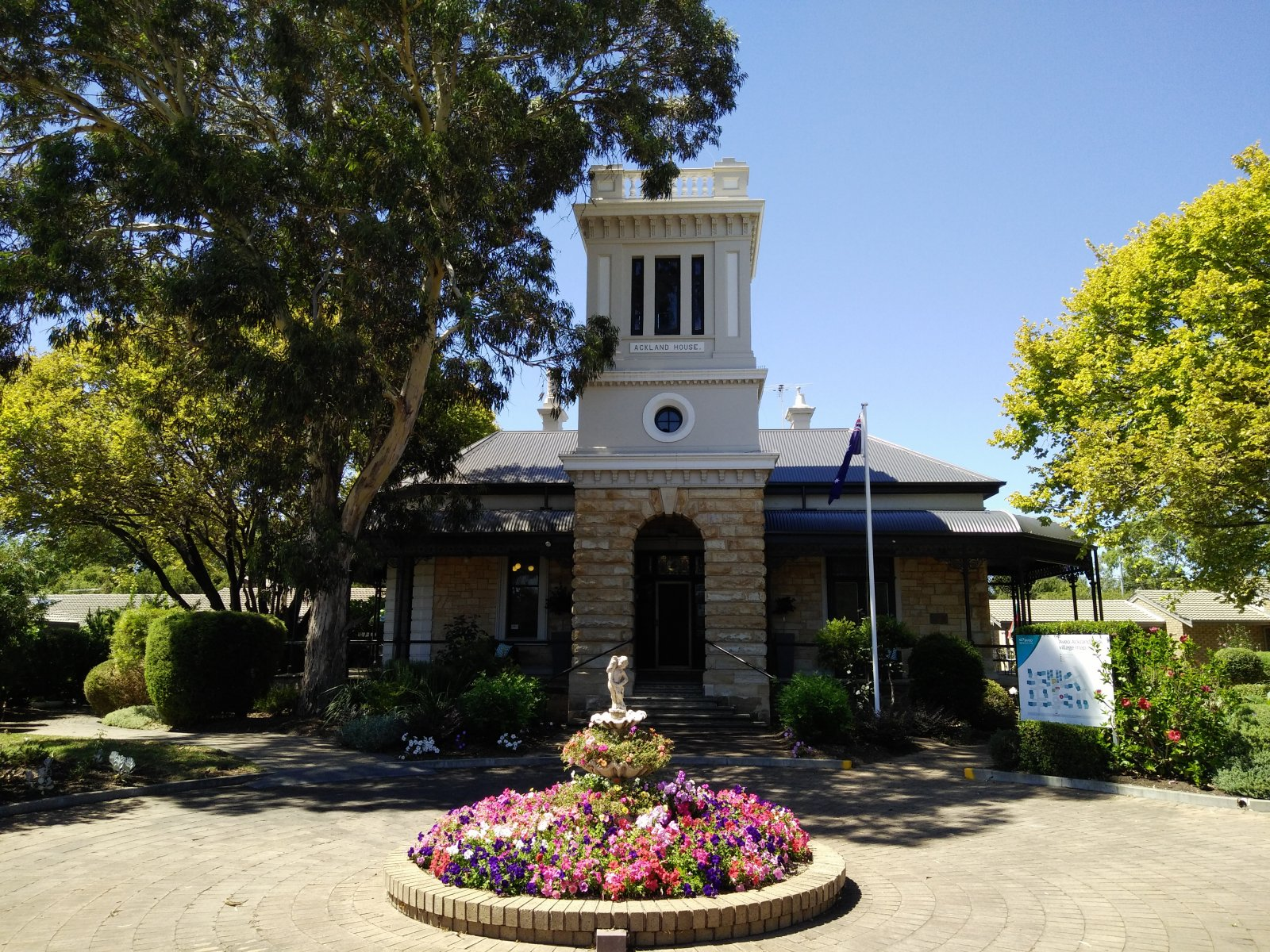
- Ackland House (built 1901)

- Interactive map of Everard Park
- Country: Australia
- State: South Australia
- City: Adelaide
- LGA: City of Unley
- Location: 3 km (1.9 mi) from Adelaide

Government
  - State electorate: Badcoe
  - Federal division: Adelaide

Population
  - Total: 1,071 (SAL 2021)
- Postcode: 5035
Suburbs around Everard Park
Kurralta Park	Ashford	Keswick
Glandore	Everard Park	Forestville
Glandore	Black Forest	Black Forest

Everard Park is a small inner south-western suburb of Adelaide in the City of Unley, once part of the extensive land holdings of the prominent colonist Dr. Charles George Everard, and the location of "Marshfield", the home of part of his family.

It is also the location of Ackland House, built for chaff merchant William Ackland in 1901.

The suburb is bounded by Anzac Highway to the northwest, South Road to the west, Norman Terrace and the Glenelg tram line to the southeast, and Third and Fourth Avenues to the east. Surrounding suburbs are Forestville, Ashford, Glandore and Black Forest.

The triangular Everard Park Reserve is located in the northern part of the suburb surrounded by Africaine, Nibley and Hillsley Avenues. Aveo Ackland Park retirement village (named after Ackland House) and Lifecare Parkrose Village are located on Norman Terrace.

The suburb is served by Glenelg tram stop 5 to the southeast, stop 6 to the south west, and by many bus routes along South Road and Anzac Highway.

The art deco Roxy picture theatre building is located on Anzac Highway.

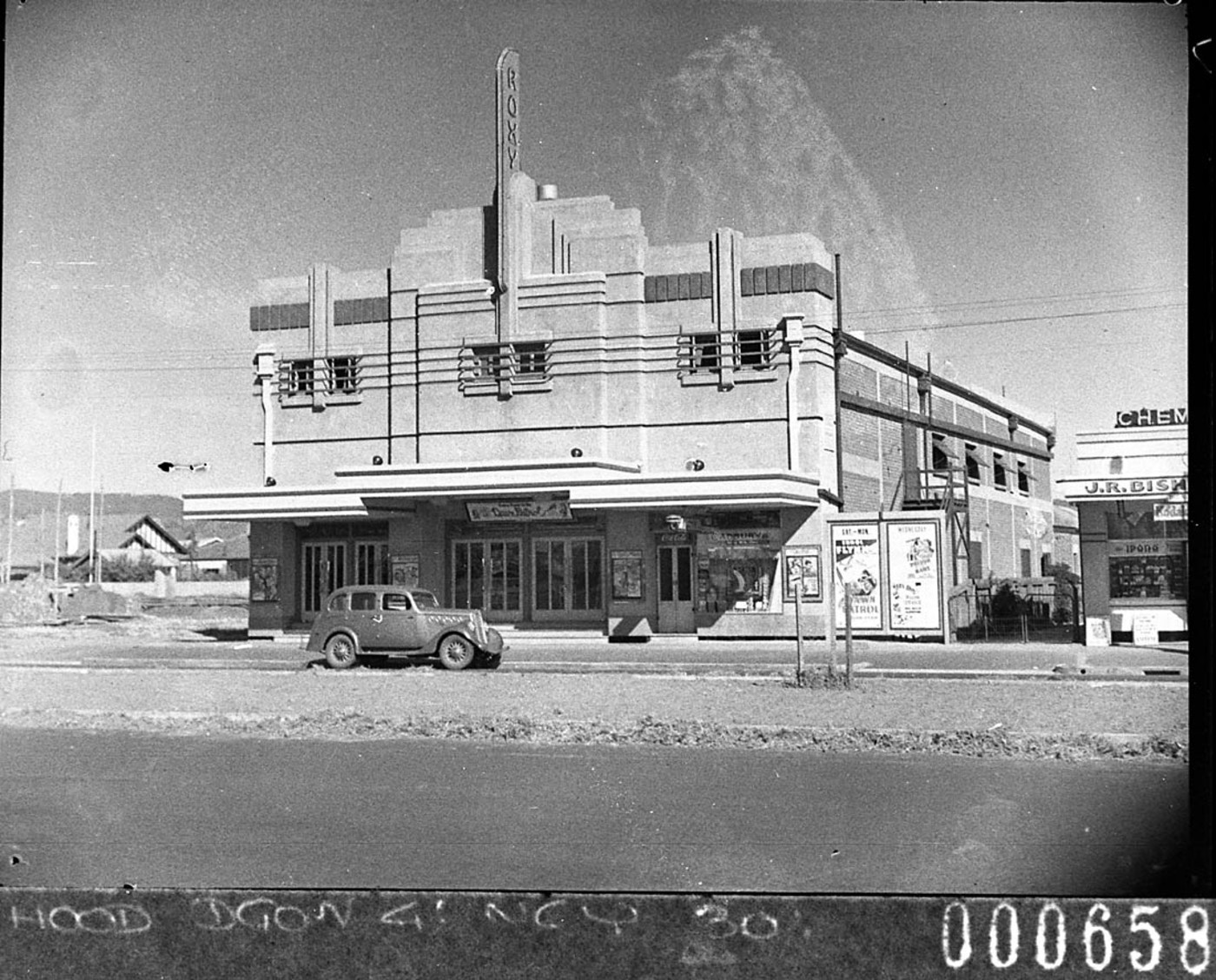
The Roxy in 1939

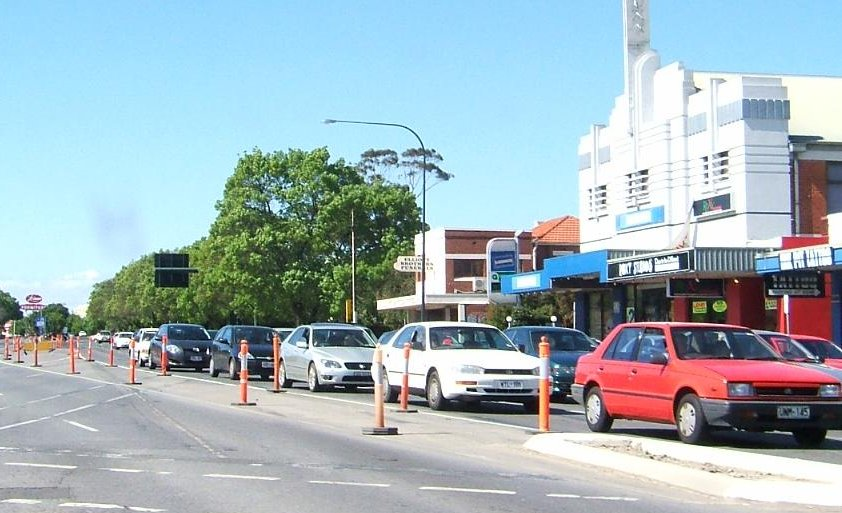
The Roxy in 2008

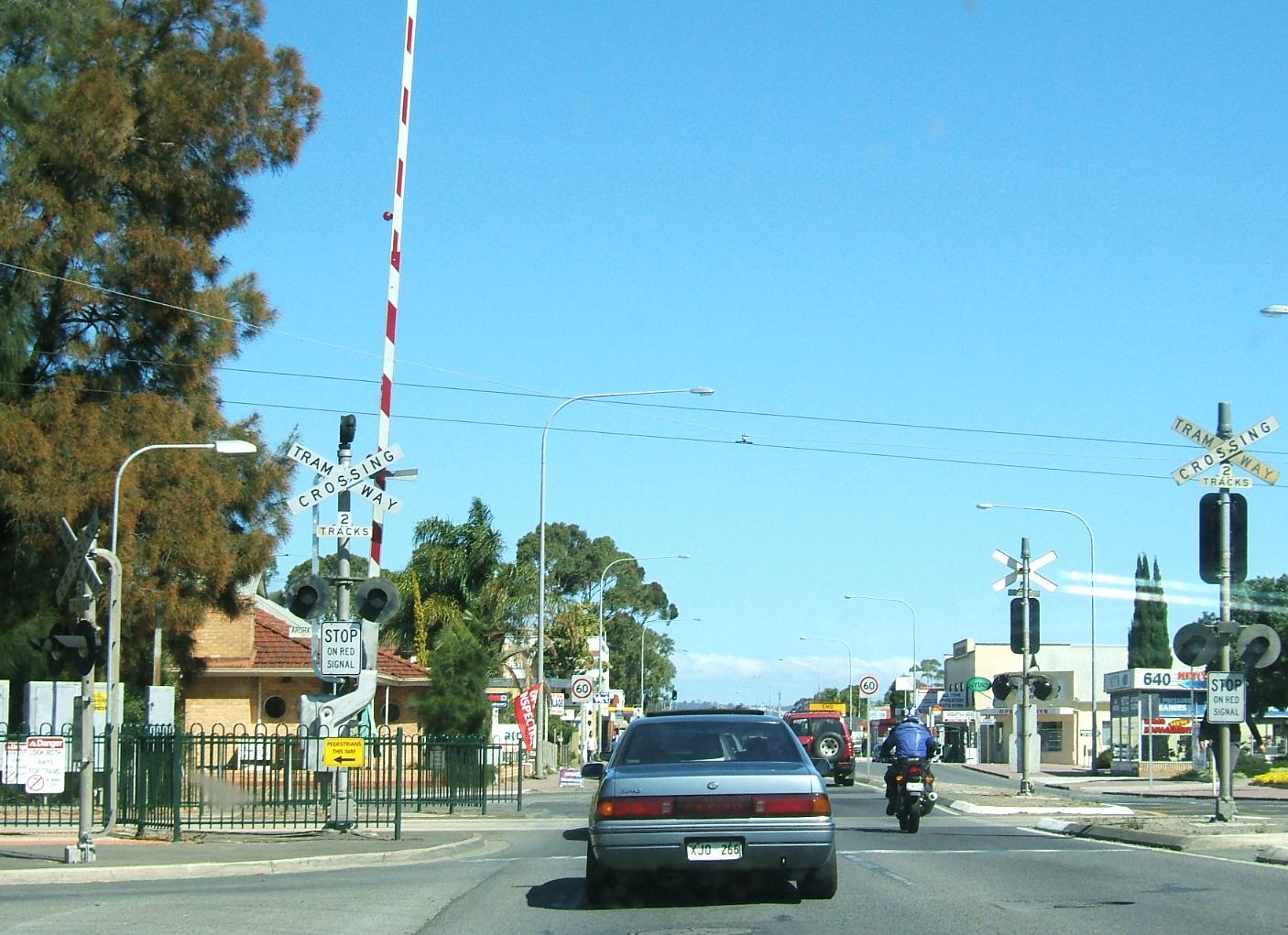
South Road at the former Everard Park tram crossing before construction of a tram overpass

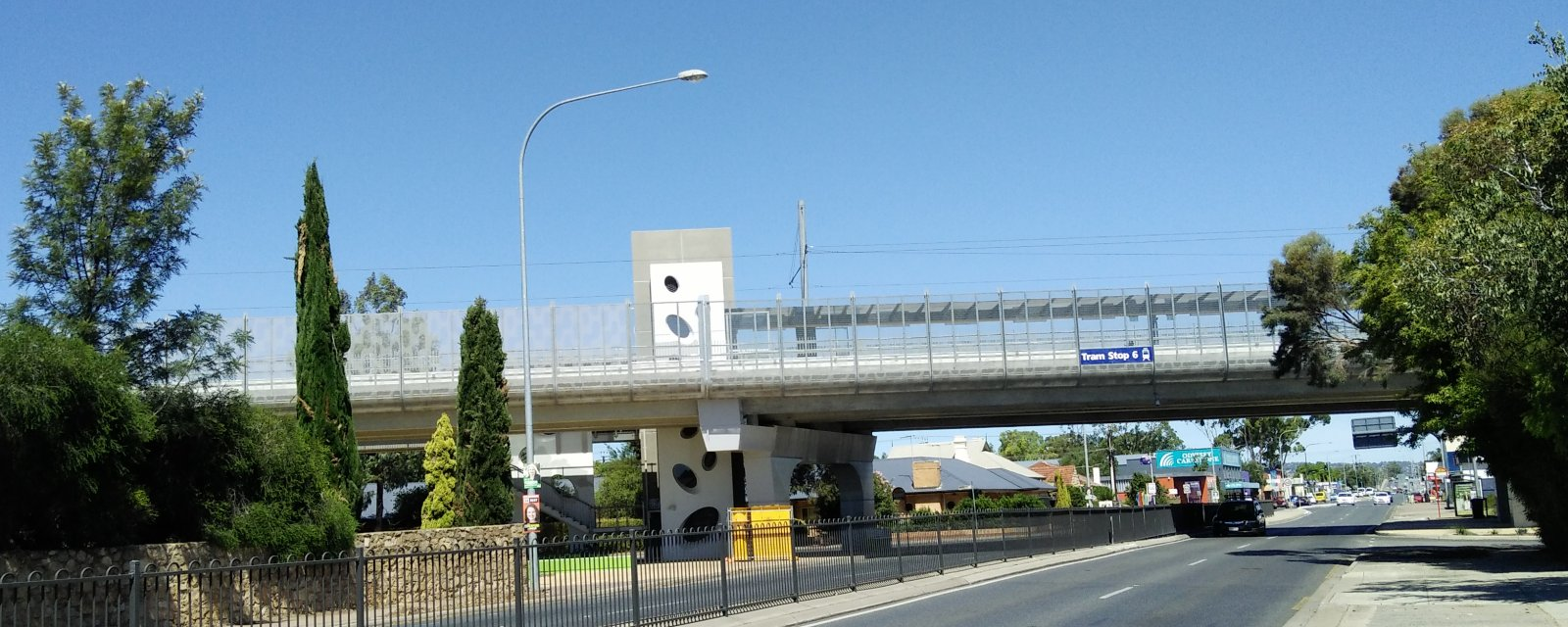
South Road Tram Overpass and tram stop 6
