= Henry Lamshed =

Australian politician

Member for Yorke Peninsula in the South Australian House of Assembly
- In office April 1890 – April 1893 Serving with Harry Bartlett
- Preceded by: Robert Caldwell
- Succeeded by: Arthur Short (politician)

Chairman of District Council of Yorke Peninsula
- In office 1888 – 1890 ?

Member of District Council of Strathalbyn
- In office 1867 – 1873 ?

Personal details
- Born: 11 April 1836 near Plymouth, England
- Died: 13 June 1918 (aged 82) Maitland, South Australia
- Resting place: Maitland, South Australia
- Spouses: Harriet Johnston (m. 1858; died 1864) Elizabeth Choules (m. 1864; died 1897) Sarah Jane Slade (m. 1898)
- Occupation: Carrier, farmer, politician

Henry Lamshed (11 April 1836 – 13 June 1918) was a farmer and politician in colonial South Australia.

Lamshed was born near Plymouth, England, a descendant of an old Newton Abbott, Devonshire, family. He emigrated to South Australia on the Lord Hungerford, arriving at Port Adelaide in November 1856, and for several years worked on a farm at McLaren Vale. He established a carrying business at Strathalbyn. He took up land near Maitland when that district was first opened for settlement around 1875, and ran a farm there, "Oakwood", until around 1916, when he retired.

He was a member of the Strathalbyn District Council from 1867 until he closed his carrying business in 1873 to take up farming on Yorke Peninsula. In 1888 he was one of the foundation members of the Yorke's Peninsula District Council. He was elected to the seat of Yorke Peninsula in the South Australian House of Assembly and served from April 1890 to April 1893 as a colleague of Harry Bartlett.

He died after several months' illness and was buried in Maitland.

== Family ==
Henry Lamshed married Harriet Johnston (c. 1836 – 28 March 1864); they had two sons. He married again, to Elizabeth Choules (16 May 1838 – 14 June 1897) in November 1864. Her family arrived in S.A. on the Diadem in November 1840; she had a previous marriage to William Spanswick. He married a third time, on 24 February 1898, to Sarah Jane Slade (c. 1850 – 18 July 1938) of Alberton. His children included:

- Samuel Thomas Lamshed (29 January 1859 – 22 October 1916) born in Brighton, South Australia, married Sabina Cornish (c. 1863 – 13 April 1945) on 18 November 1885, lived at Kainton then Sunny Vale, Yorke Peninsula.
- William Lamshed (6 January 1861 – 3 April 1878) was drowned in a dam while watering horses.
- Henry Herbert Lamshed (19 September 1865 – 21 July 1942) married (Lucy) Ann Greenslade (c. 1866 – 19 May 1923) on 6 March 1889. He was a Maitland town councillor and served a term from 1922 as Mayor and subsequently as Magistrate. He married again, to "Bessie", in late 1927.
- Ellen Mary "Nellie" Lamshed (19 February 1867 – 1938) married Henry "Harry" Wilkinson (14 May 1865 – ) on 31 March 1891
- Frederick George Lamshed (16 June 1870 – 2 December 1940) married Ada Jane Edwards on 29 April 1896, lived at "Oakwood", Maitland.
- Charles Arthur Lamshed (20 May 1873 – 31 October 1931) married Alice Elisabeth Rowe (5 January 1883 – 12 September 1956) on 15 December 1899. A worker for Red Cross and the Cheer-Up Society, he was postmaster at Yorketown when he died in a cricketing accident. Alice was appointed MBE in 1952 for her work with the South Australia Mental Hospital Women's Auxiliary.
- Francis Walter "Frank" Lamshed (15 August 1874 – 7 November 1952) married Eva Tilly (5 March 1880 – 8 November 1956) on 3 September 1902
- Edith Elizabeth Lamshed (14 October 1875 – 14 September 1969)
- Theodore William Lamshed (13 July 1881 – 1 December 1930)

== Wider South Australian Lamshed family ==
The surname "Lamshed", rare elsewhere in Australia, was well known in South Australia around Strathalbyn, Maitland, Kadina and Moonta in the late 19th century.

It appears that over about ten years, most of a large family of Lamshed/Lamshead/Lambshead migrated to South Australia. Most of them lived around Strathalbyn in the 1860s, then moved to the upper Yorke Peninsula area when it was opened for closer settlement in the 1870s.

Henry's father Samuel migrated last, in 1865 on the Maori with Samuel's second wife Jane and youngest three children. The surname spelling appears to have been Lambshead or Lamshead in some early South Australian documents, but eventually standardised on Lamshed.

=== Thomas Lamshed ===
Thomas Lamshed (c. 1843 – 28 August 1912) born Bere Alston, Devon, emigrated 1862, lived Strathalbyn, married Elizabeth G(eorge) Bailey (1846 – 20 March 1933), farmed at Echunga, Mount Crawford, Riverton, Maitland, Sunny Vale, retired to Kadina.

- Thomas James Lamshed (4 June 1864 – 4 June 1912) married Sarah Baldock (23 May 1868 – 2 July 1946) of Tipara on 20 November 1889, lived Sunny Vale.

- Clarence Albert Lamshed ( – ) was witness to the World War I death of cousin William Horace Lamshed.

- William Lamshed (2 June 1866 – 21 March 1944) married (Priscilla) Amy Gepp (2 June 1867 – 7 August 1898) of Magill, was postmaster at Hallett c. 1897–1905, Wilmington 1905–1909, then lived at Mile End
- Samuel Lamshed (19 September 1868 – 20 October 1944) married Annie Florence Scott of Moonta on 28 January 1892. He married again, to Emma "Emmie" Mutton on 2 March 1904, lived Kainton then Kadina

- William Horace "Will" Lamshed (8 May 1894 – 20 September 1917), born at Weetulta, was killed in action, Polygon Wood, Belgium, during the Third Battle of Ypres.

- Gilbert Lamshed (31 August 1872 – 10 June 1951) married Laura Ethel Porker of Kainton on 8 March 1899, lived Cunliffe later Seaton Park, Adelaide
- Arthur John "Jack" Lamshed (19 October 1875 – 18 November 1954) married Priscilla Florence Rose, lived at Cunliffe then Kadina
- Ada Elizabeth Lamshed (11 November 1878 – 1923) married Francis Herbert (or Herbert Francis) Baldock (c. 1875 – 28 January 1947) of Sandilands
- Alfred George Lamshed (15 August 1880 – 25 August 1941) married Florence Ann "Flo" Walker on 3 April 1907, lived Tipara then Sunny Vale
- Herbert Sydney Lamshed (2 September 1884 – 19 December 1938) married Margaretta Stanway on 30 June 1909
- Walter Ernest "Ern" Lamshed (3 May 1888 – 1968) married Mabel Phillips on 27 June 1921, farmed at Kadina
- Nellie May Lamshed (22 January 1891 – 27 February 1976) married George Robinson Snodgrass (24 July 1883 – 11 March 1939), farmed at Wallaroo; he died following a gun accident

=== Others ===
The family of Samuel Lamshed sen. appears to have been:

- With Mary Ann Choke (1810–1853)
  - Henry William (1836–1918), the subject of this article, migrated on the Lord Hungerford in 1856
  - Sarah Ann (1838–1939), may have married someone Thomas and lived in Sydney
  - Mary (1839–1932), migrated on the Ocean Chief in 1864, married Thomas Blatchford in 1865
  - Ann (1841–1930), migrated on the Ocean Chief in 1864, married Benjamin Lloyd in 1865
  - Thomas (1843–1912) migrated on the Mary Shepherd in 1863, further described above
  - William (1845–1880) married Lucy Swann in 1878 in South Australia
  - Samuel (1848–1901), Maori 1865 married Ellen Bell
  - Jacob (or James) (1852–1874), Maori 1865 married Sarah Ann Foster 1873
- with Jane Lambshead (ca. 1815–1892), Maori 1865
  - Emma Jane (1858-1950), Maori 1865 married William Fletcher 1883

=== Max Lamshed ===
The noted journalist and Red Cross official Maxwell Robert Arthur "Max" Lamshed OBE (5 April 1901 – 25 July 1971) was the only child of A. J. Lamshed of Rendelsham, Robe and Mount Gambier. Max's grandfather was the Jacob listed above. Max described Will Lamshed (1894–1917) as a "great-uncle".
