= Charles George Everard =

Australian politician

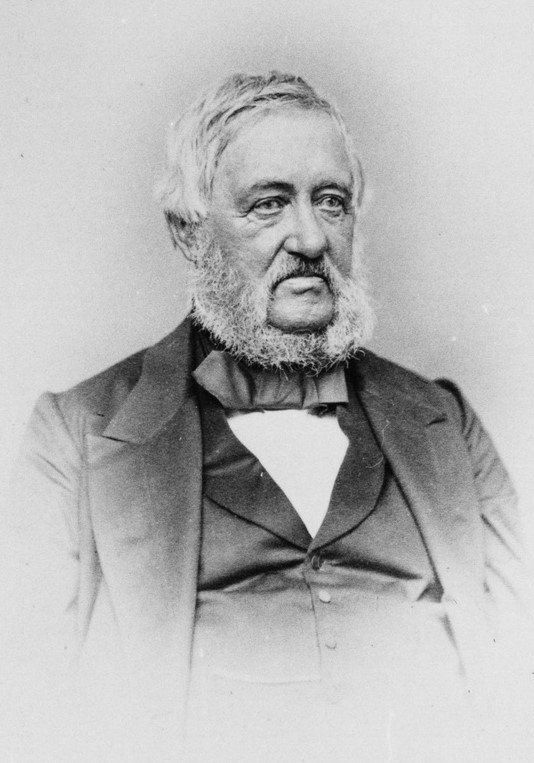

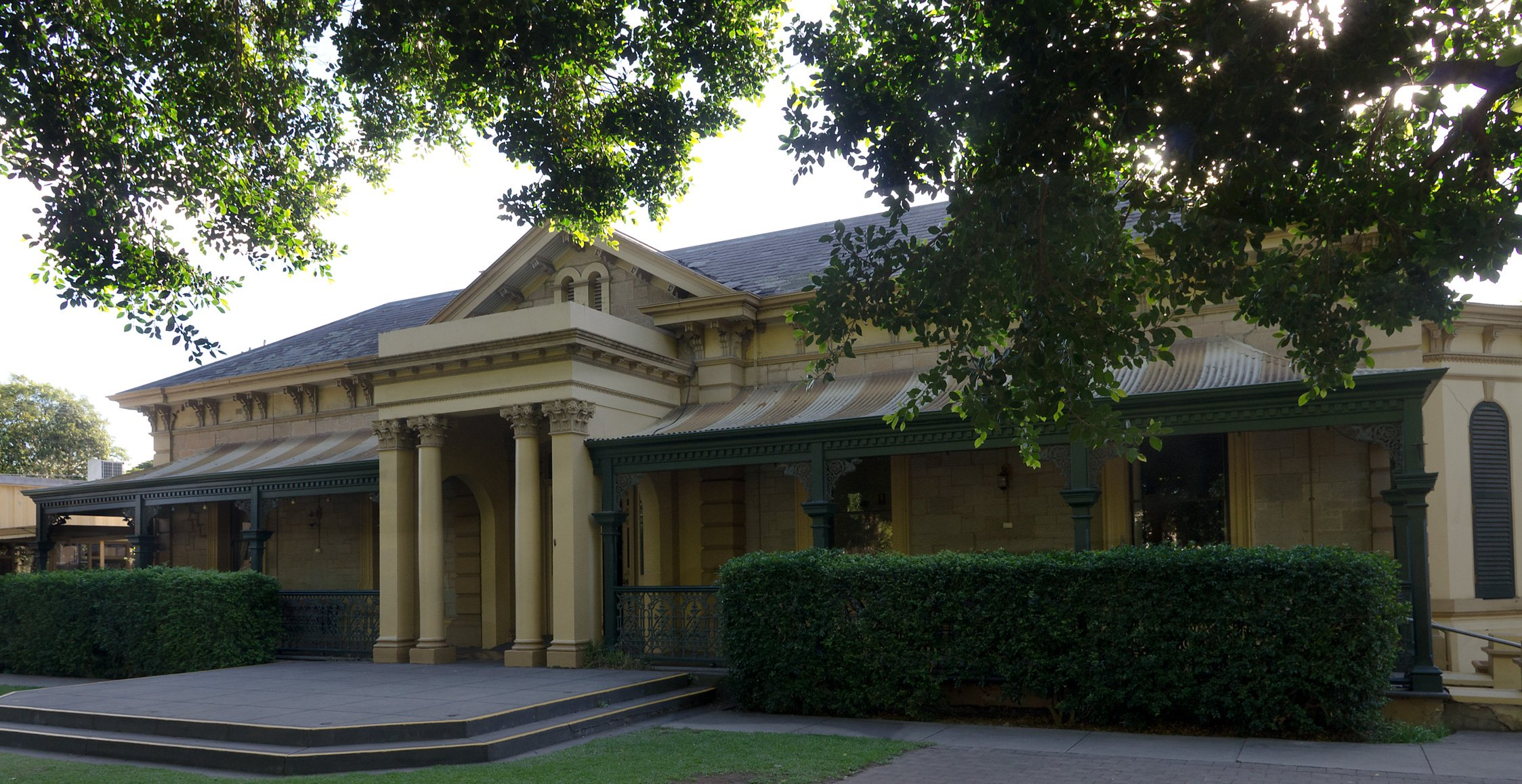
Ashford House in 2013

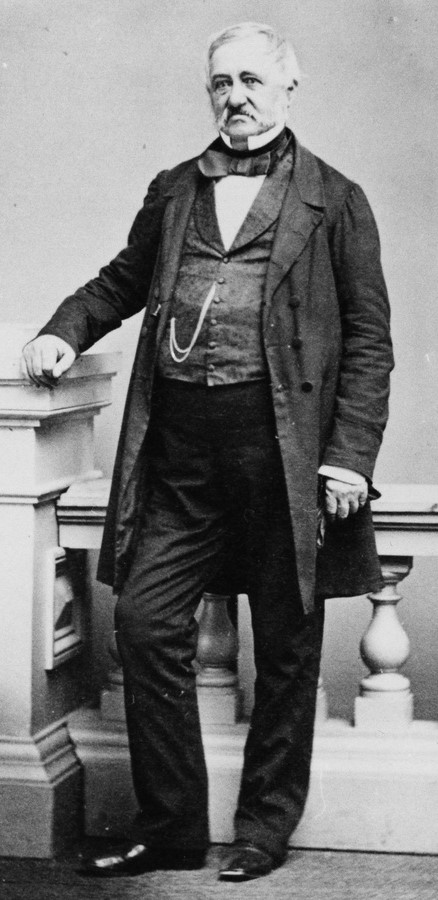

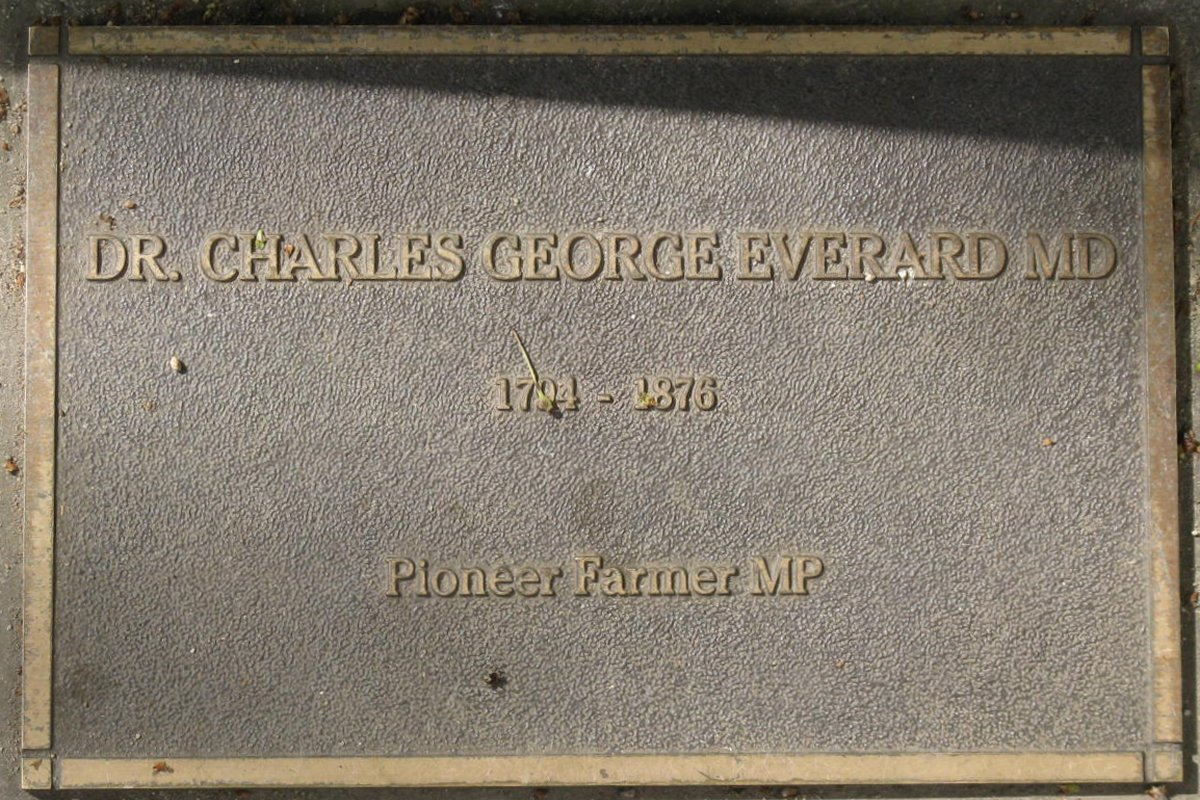
Plaque on the Jubilee 150 Walkway (North Terrace, Adelaide).

Dr Charles George Everard MD (29 August 1794 – 30 March 1876) was a medical doctor, pioneer farmer and Member of the Legislative Council, in the early days of South Australia.

== Early life ==
Charles was born in Marshfield Gloucestershire on 29 August 1794. He, his wife Catherine (1786–1866), and children William (1819–1889), Charles John (1821–1892) and James George (died 1840 at aged 15) of Gloucestershire, arrived in Adelaide from London on the ship Africaine under Captain John Finlay Duff on 9 November 1836, and were present at the Proclamation of the new Colony.

== Contribution to South Australia ==
Before leaving England he had purchased Sections 43 and 44 in the Hundred of Adelaide and eight Town Acres. He built his first house on one of these, on the corner of Hindley and Morphett Streets, along with a row of shops. He then turned his attention to Section 43 on the Bay Road (now Anzac Highway). Around 1838 he acquired Section 52 from Walter Thompson, making a total of 138 acres. By 1841 he and son William had cropped several acres of wheat and some barley, and built two cottages; one of pine and one of brick.

In 1838 he built a house at what is now 87 Anzac Highway, called Ashford House and was used for Ashford Special School, later renamed to Errington Special Education Centre, until the end of 2013.

Everard was appointed a justice of the peace in 1850 and won a seat in the first fully elected Legislative Council in 1857.

Everard Park, South Australia was once part of his extensive land holdings: two acres on Wakefield Street, for many years used as a pitch for visiting circuses, was in 1894 purchased by A. Simpson & Son for a factory.

== Other ==
Everard's son William was a member of the South Australian House of Assembly then the Legislative Council and was Minister for Education at the time of Everard's death.

The Electoral district of Ashford's name derives from the name given by Everard sometime before 1845 to his property 'Ashford', that was thought to have the best orchard in the colony. The name was also given to a suburb within the electorate: Ashford, South Australia
