= Ashford House =

Historic house in Adelaide, Australia

Coordinates: 34.9506°S 138.5744°E

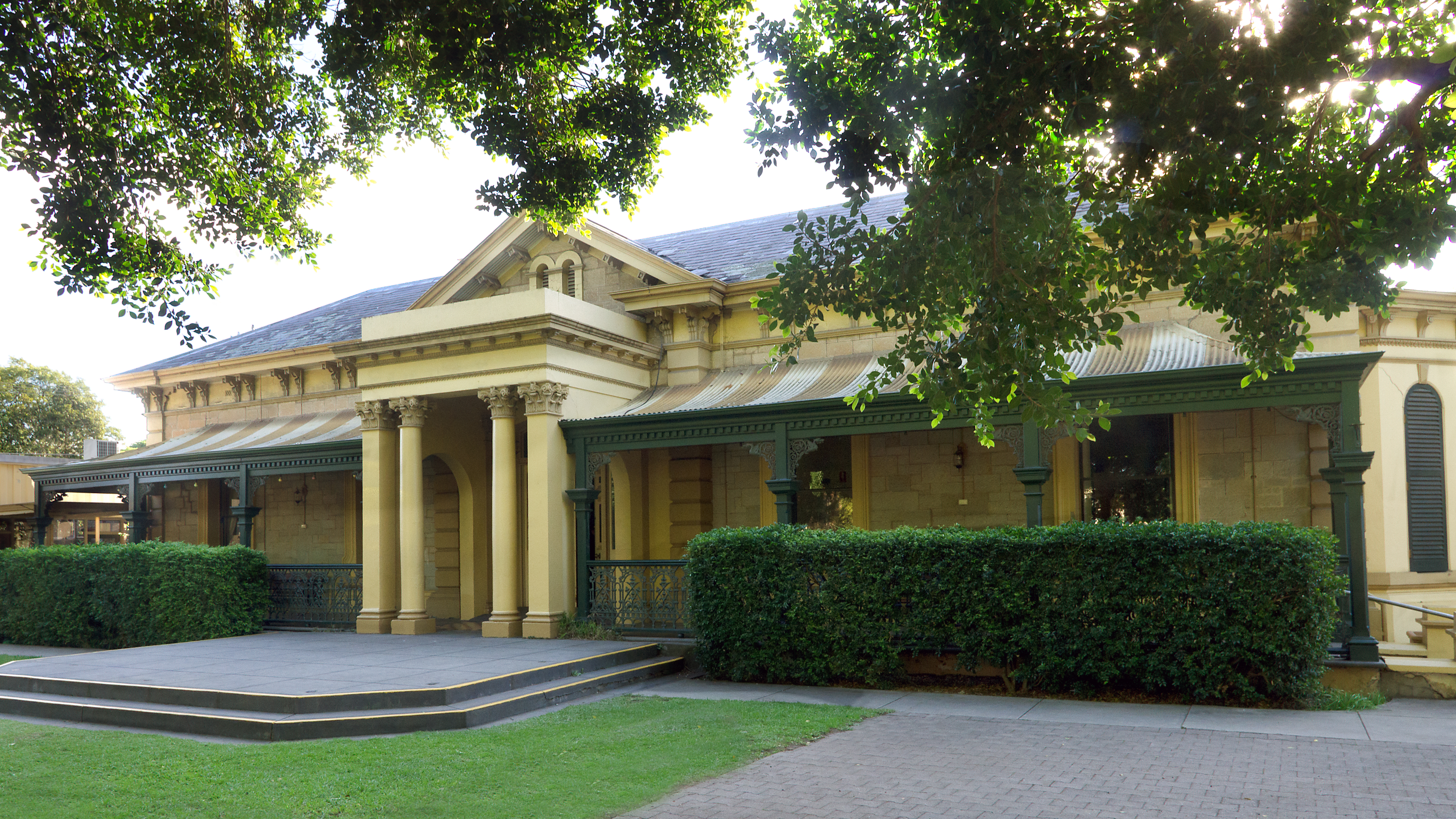
Ashford House in 2013

Ashford House, located in the Adelaide suburb of Ashford, South Australia, was originally built in 1838 by Dr Charles Everard, and is amongst the oldest historic buildings in South Australia.

The house has Local Heritage listing status with the City of West Torrens.

On 19 November 2019, the City of West Torrens voted and resolved to seek State Heritage listing by the SA Heritage Council.

== History ==
The current building was completed in 1882. At the rear of the house are the remains of an old gum tree, which is of historical significance as it was in place when Dr Everard arrived in 1836.

== Usage ==
In 1952 The Crippled Children’s Association of South Australia purchased Ashford House. Since 1976 the house has been operated by the Department of Education and Children Development and currently forms part of the Errington Special Education Centre. It was placed on the Classified List by the National Trust of South Australia in 1980. In October 2012, the South Australian State Government announced construction had commenced at the William Light School in Plympton to allow relocation from the current site at the beginning of 2014. In November 2013, the SA Government announced a school specifically for children with autism spectrum disorders will commence in 2015. The school, called the Treetop Autism Specific School, opened in 2016 and is the state's first school specifically for autistic students.
