= Cressida O'Hanlon =

Australian politician

Cressida O'Hanlon MP
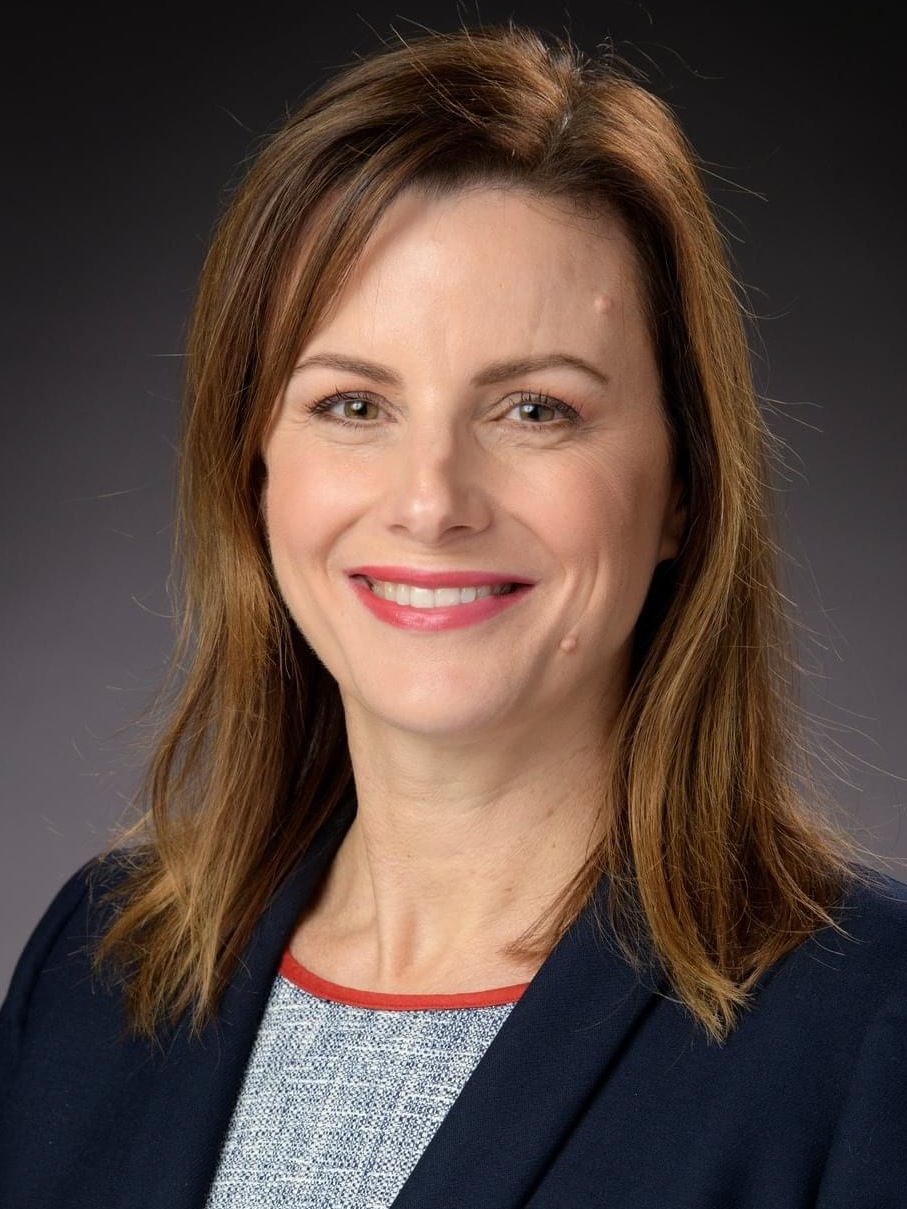
- Official portrait, 2022

Member of the South Australian House of Assembly for Dunstan
- Incumbent
- Assumed office 23 March 2024
- Preceded by: Steven Marshall

Personal details
- Born: 1972 (age 53–54)
- Party: Labor
- Relations: Boyd family

Cressida Clytie O'Hanlon (born 1972) is an Australian politician from the Labor Party. She has been a member of the South Australian House of Assembly since winning the 2024 Dunstan state by-election. She contested the same seat against Premier Steven Marshall in the 2022 state election losing by 260 votes.

Cressida previously owned her own corporate mediating business and also worked part-time as a staff member to Reggie Martin MLC.

== Political career ==
In the 2019 Australian federal election she was the Australian Labor Party candidate in the Division of Sturt running unsuccessfully against Liberal candidate James Stevens.

At the 2022 South Australian state election, O'Hanlon challenged the Premier, Steven Marshall, in his seat of Dunstan. A redistribution seemingly made Dunstan more secure for Marshall, and O'Hanlon needed a 7.1 percent swing to win it. However, election night saw a large swing toward Labor in Adelaide, and O’Hanlon picked up a swing of 6.9 percent after Green preferences flowed overwhelmingly to her. Had 260 more Green voters preferenced her ahead of Marshall, O'Hanlon would have won.

Marshall retired from politics two years later. In the ensuing by-election, O’Hanlon made political history when she became the first government-backed candidate to win a seat from the opposition in a South Australian by-election in more than 116 years. Labor won the seat by 360 votes.

O'Hanlon won a full term at the 2026 state election, boosting her slender majority to 8.1 percent, on the stronger side of fairly safe. This was Labor's best result in Dunstan and its predecessor, Norwood, since 1982.

== Family ==
Cressida is married to businessman and Army officer, James O'Hanlon, who is a 33-year veteran of the Australian Army. She is the daughter of a bricklayer and an artist.

Her grandparents, part of the Boyd artistic dynasty, were the artists David Boyd and Hermia Boyd.

South Australian House of Assembly
| Preceded by Steven Marshall | Member for Dunstan; 2024–present | Incumbent |
