= Arthur Short (politician) =

Australian politician

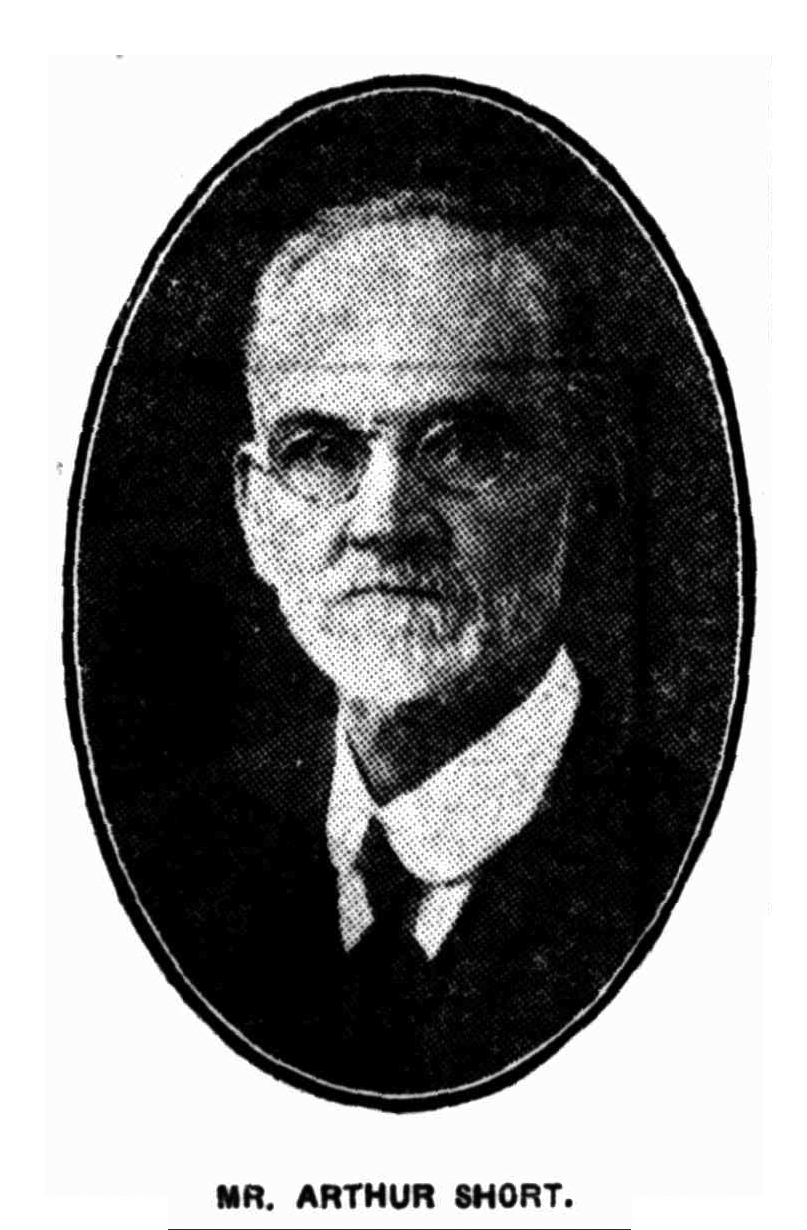
from "An Eventful Life", The Register, 23 February 1926, p. 10

Arthur Short (18 June 1850 – 25 October 1933) was a politician in the British colony of South Australia.

Arthur was born in Salisbury, South Australia to Edwin and Ann Short, née Kerwin.

Edwin was a son of Captain William Short H.E.I.C.S., and may also have served in the East India Company, but had been chief officer on the Emma trading between Adelaide and Sydney. He married in Sydney in October 1842 and moved to South Australia the following January. They lived first in South Richmond, as did Edwin's father William, and in 1846 settled at Yankalilla, then around 1848 moved to "Courtwick Farm", Salisbury, where Arthur and his brother Albert excelled in athletics. In 1869 Edwin Short selected 1,000 acres (400 ha) near Maitland and the Cocoanut [sic] Station, Kulpara which the boys managed alone until 1873 when the rest of the family moved to "The Cocoanut".

Arthur was educated at a Grammar School. His father, always an aggressive man, around 1860 following a blow to the head, began displaying erratic behaviour. He believed he was being persecuted by the Rymill brothers, Sir Henry Ayers and his own lawyers Way & Symon. He became so violent that in 1876 his wife petitioned for him to be admitted to the Adelaide Lunatic Asylum. Edwin Short appealed against his confinement, and was able to produce witnesses as to his sanity, but evidence given by his family and neighbours was compelling. Arthur had taken over management of the properties, and in 1880 was licensed as an auctioneer.

When Maitland, Kilkerran, Moolywurtie, and Cunningham were formed into a district he was elected the first district clerk, later Maitland's first town clerk, and Mayor for a total of six years. He was elected to the South Australian House of Assembly seat of Yorke Peninsula and served from April 1893 to April 1896, succeeding Henry Lamshed as associate of Harry Bartlett. He stood again, but was beaten by William Copley.

He left for Western Australia, where he ran an auctioneering business in Murray Street, Perth from 1898, then Hay Street. He contested the Western Australian Legislative Assembly seats of West Perth in 1900 and East Perth seat in 1901, but was unsuccessful. He filed for bankruptcy in 1904 and returned to South Australia sometime after mid-1906.

In 1908 he applied for an auctioneer's licence in South Australia and again in 1916, then began auctioneering for Phillips & Co. of Franklin Street. He had a residence at 157 Fisher Street, Malvern, where he died.

== Family ==
William Short H.E.I.C.S. ( – before October 1873)

- Edwin Short ( – ) married Ann Kerwin ( – ) in Sydney in October 1842. Both died before 1926. Their children included:

- Edwin Short jnr (c. 1844 – )
- William Short (21 October 1846 – ) married Mary Frost (c. May 1846 – 23 April 1917) in 1865. He was born at Brighton, farmed at "Courtwick", Salisbury for two years, then from around 1876 a pioneer farmer at Winulta.
- Albert Short (10 April 1848 – ) married Emma Kentish (12 May 1854 – ) on 13 January 1875
- Arthur Short (18 June 1850 – 25 October 1933) married Julia Nugent Blackham (10 October 1856 – 13 August 1949, daughter of William John James Blackham and Elizabeth Blackham née Guy) on 9 June 1881, lived at Glenelg in 1925

- Ida Frances Julia Short (6 January 1883 – 1968)
- Lillie Estelle/Estella Kerwin/Kirwan Short (14 March 1885 – 1966)
- Arthur Ernest William Short (24 October 1888 – 19 July 1949), known as Ernest or A.E.W. Short, married Viola Warren on 28 October 1914. He was managing director of paper merchants Woolcott, Short & Co. and elected Lord Mayor of Adelaide 1949, but died a few weeks later.
- Florence Adair "Florrie" Short (1890–1981) married Augustus Montay/Moutray "Gus" Crane ( –1971) on 18 December 1924

- Ellen Short (c. 1853 – ) married Charles Albert Abbott ( – ) on 5 September 1898
- Alfred Short (after 1855 – )
- Emily Short (c. August 1860 – 4 October 1873) died after falling from a horse
