= Daniel Davies (Australian politician) =

Australian politician

Daniel Merddyn Scott Davies (1 March 1872 – 1 October 1951) was an Australian politician who represented the South Australian House of Assembly seat of Yorke Peninsula from 1933 to 1941 as an independent.

Davies was a postal employee at Mount Gambier for seven years, before being transferred as assistant postmaster at Glenelg in 1899, and then again transferred as postmaster at Minlaton in 1908, where he remained for the rest of his life. He initially continued as postmaster, but later become an auctioneer and agent, working as an agent until his death. He was a long-serving Justice of the Peace, had been Assistant Returning Officer for Yorke Peninsula for 21 years prior to standing for parliament and was secretary, and later long-serving auditor, of the Minlaton Institute. He was also secretary of the Minlaton Show and Minlaton Literary Society, was a founder of the Minlaton Dramatic Club, and was the Minlaton representative of the Yorketown Pioneer.

Davies was elected to the House of Assembly for Yorke Peninsula as an independent at the 1933 state election. He was re-elected at the 1938 election, when he was one of 14 of 39 independent lower house MPs, which as a grouping won 40 percent of the primary vote, more than either of the major parties. Davies was involved in organising among the independents in the aftermath and served as the representative of the independent MPs on the public works committee. He was strongly opposed to party politics, internal party preselections and binding caucus votes, and supported proportional representation and an overhaul of betting legislation. He was defeated by Liberal and Country League candidate Cecil Hincks at the 1941 election.

He died at the Minlaton Hospital in October 1951.

South Australian House of Assembly
Preceded by Edward Giles	Member for Yorke Peninsula; 1933–1941; Served alongside: Baden Pattinson (to 1938)	Succeeded by Cecil Hincks
