= Cecil Hincks =

Australian politician

Sir Cecil Hincks
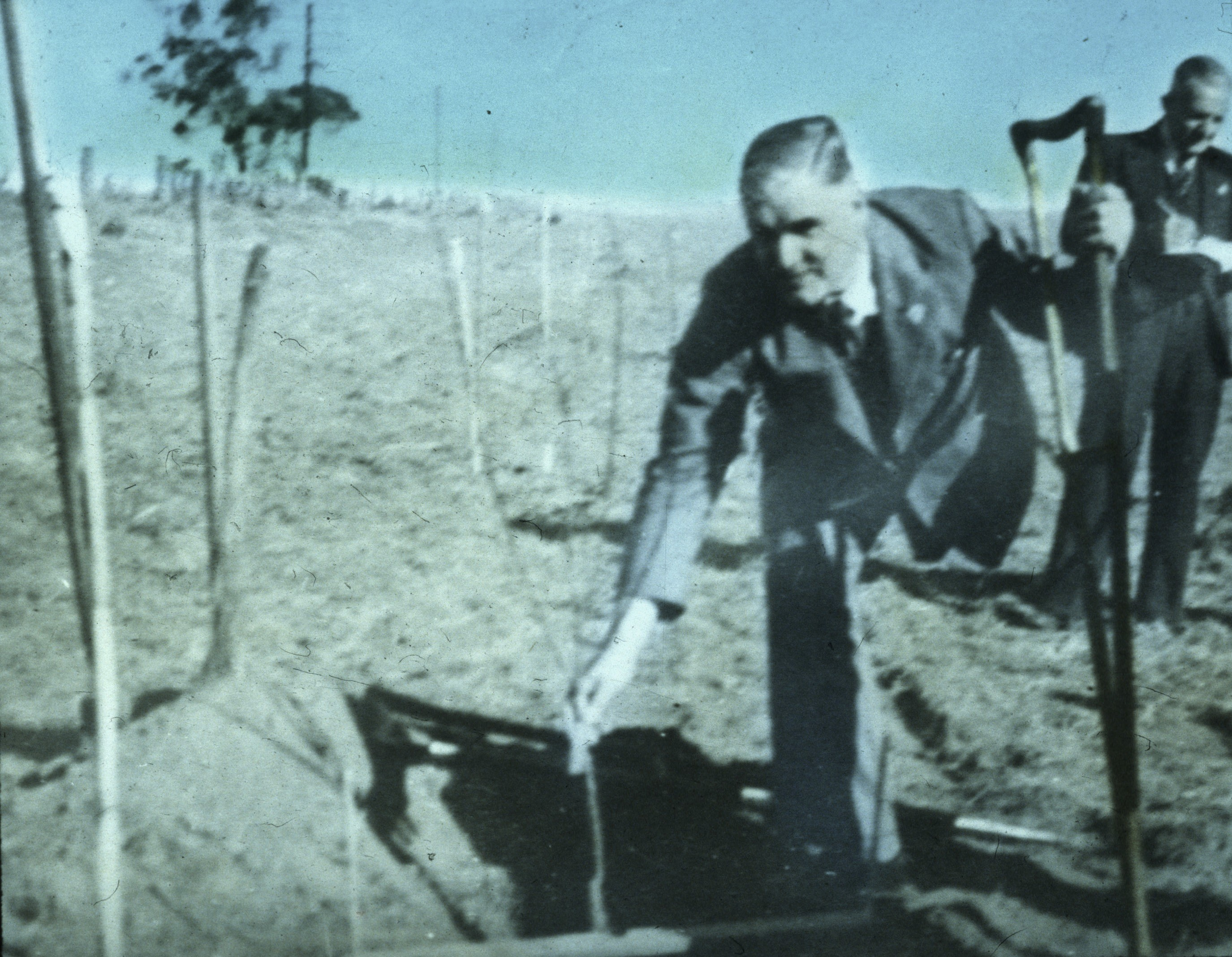
- Sir Cecil Hincks Planting a Tree Opening of Loxton Irrigation Murray River, 1949

Minister of Lands, Irrigation and Repatriation (South Australia)
- In office 17 April 1946 – 1 January 1963
- Preceded by: Reginald Rudall
- Succeeded by: Percy Quirke
- Constituency: Yorke Peninsula

Personal details
- Born: Cecil Stephen Hincks; 18 February 1894 Maitland, South Australia
- Died: 1 January 1963 (aged 68) Daw Park, Adelaide, South Australia, Australia
- Party: Liberal and Country League
- Other political affiliations: Liberal Party
- Spouse(s): Gladys Lottie Merritt (1918–1920); Edith May Staples (1935–1963)

Military service
- Allegiance: Australia
- Branch/service: Australian Army
- Years of service: 1914–1920, 1940–1946
- Rank: Lieutenant
- Unit: 10th Battalion
- Battles/wars: Battle of Lagnicourt (1917)

Sir Cecil Stephen Hincks (18 February 1894 – 1 January 1963), Australian politician, was a member of the South Australian House of Assembly who was Minister of Lands, Irrigation and Repatriation in Thomas Playford's government.

== Early life ==
Cecil Hincks was born on 18 February 1894, in the township of Maitland, South Australia, the son of miller Henry Stephen Hincks and his wife Emily Frances Picton (née Parkins). He was educated at Port Victoria Public School and the Collegiate School of St Peter, and followed his father into the flour milling trade after completion of his schooling, while training with the cadets and citizens' force. In 1914, he was considered to try out for the Port Adelaide Football Club, but his trial was cancelled due to the outbreak of World War I.

== Military career ==
=== World War I ===
At the outbreak of the war, the Hincks family was living in the town of Gawler, 40 kilometres (25 mi) north of Adelaide. Hincks travelled to Morphettville, where he enlisted in the Australian Imperial Force on 28 August 1914 and was assigned to the South Australian 10th Battalion's 'G' Company as a Lance Corporal.

Hincks served with the 10th Battalion in the Gallipoli Campaign, coming ashore at Anzac Cove on 25 April 1915 ahead of the main landing of Australian forces. On 28 April, Hincks was promoted to Corporal, and on 4 August to Sergeant. In September 1915, Hincks was evacuated to Mudros after he was found to have developed influenza and an intestinal disease. In October he was admitted to hospital in Cardiff, and nearly a year later he was discharged from hospital in Salisbury and returned to rejoin his unit at the Western Front on 23 August 1916.

At the Battle of Lagnicourt, part of the Battle of Arras in 1917, Hincks received gunshot wounds to his legs and chest, and was sent to Rouen where his condition was assessed as "dangerously ill". He was evacuated to England to recover, and after surgery over the following year, his injured leg was amputated. In 1918, he married Gladys Lottie Merritt in Surbiton, Surrey. He remained in England on extended sick leave for most of 1919, but left to return to Australia on 10 December. He was discharged from the 10th Battalion a year later on 13 December 1920. His marriage to Gladys ended in divorce shortly afterwards.

=== World War II ===
Lieutenant Hincks served as an Australian Army recruiting officer during World War II, working out of the Central Recruiting Depot (CRD) in Yorketown. He was promoted to Temporary Captain and transferred to the Reserve of Officers in August 1941, and was discharged on 16 May 1946.

== Political career ==
Following his discharge from the army, Hincks worked for the Wheat Harvest Board before setting up his own grain and insurance management business and starting a farm. He was a member of several charitable organisations, and a state councillor in the Returned Sailors' Soldiers' [and Airmens] Imperial League (1922–1946). At the South Australian state election in August 1941, Hincks was elected to the South Australian House of Assembly, representing the electoral district of Yorke Peninsula for the Liberal and Country League.

After serving on a committee to inspect and assess land for the Federal government for soldier settlement, Hincks was assigned to the related portfolios as Minister of Lands, Irrigation and Repatriation on 17 April 1946.

Despite his poor health, Hincks was respected and admired for his hard work in the portfolios, which he held until his death in office from cancer on 1 January 1963.

== Honours and memorials ==
Hincks was made a Knight Bachelor on 1 January 1960, for service as Minister of Lands and Repatriation in South Australia.

The Hincks Conservation Park on the Eyre Peninsula was named after him, and in 2004, the adjourning Hincks Wilderness Protection Area was declared as one of the first wilderness protection areas on mainland South Australia.

== See also ==
- Hincks
- Hundred of Hincks

Political offices
Preceded by Reginald Rudall	Minister of Lands; 1946–1963	Succeeded by Percy Quirke
Preceded by Reginald Rudall	Minister of Irrigation; 1946–1963	Succeeded by Percy Quirke
Preceded by Reginald Rudall	Minister of Repatriation; 1946–1963	Succeeded by Percy Quirke
South Australian House of Assembly
Preceded by Daniel Davies	Member for Yorke Peninsula; 1941–1963	Succeeded by James Ferguson
