= Harry Bartlett =

Australian politician

Henry Bartlett (6 January 1835 – 8 July 1915) was a politician in the colony of South Australia, dubbed "Father of the West Coast".

Harry was born in Bideford (or Holsworthy?), Devonshire, or possibly in/near London, and baptised 30 March 1835 in Holsworthy, Devon. His father Richard Bartlett appears to have died soon after the birth of his younger sister Amelia Lucy. In 1851 Harry was living as a 16 year old with his Bartlett grandfather, an innkeeper in Bideford, Devon, whilst his mother was in nearby Holsworthy. Harry arrived in Adelaide, South Australia on 5 July 1857 on the Gilmore which had departed Plymouth on 7 March, with his sister Amelia Lucy and mother Mary Anne Ribouleau Bartlett, née Perrers, entered on the ship's manifest as Harry Bartlett, age 21, born Middlesex (but his sister and mother born Holsworthy, Devon), occupation labourer.

He soon went to Woolundunga Station, near Port Augusta, and there met John McKinlay, the noted explorer, whom he accompanied on a trip to the Barrier country. Later they went together to Port Lincoln, crossing the gulf in the steamer Daphne. At that time the only buildings in Port Lincoln were a couple of shanties owned by Captain Bishop (later owner of Boston Island), and "Jimmy" Owen. He spent several years prospecting on Kangaroo Island, and Yorke Peninsula from Franklin Harbour to the Gawler Ranges, gaining an intimate knowledge of the country.

He was elected to the seat of Yorke Peninsula in the South Australian House of Assembly and sat from March 1887 to April 1896. His colleagues were, in turn, Robert Caldwell, Henry Lamshed and Arthur Short. He was remembered for his tireless advocacy on behalf of Yorke Peninsula agriculturists at a time when pastoralists were all-powerful.

He owned 742 acres (300 ha) near Port Vincent, by the road to Curramulka.

== Family ==
Little is yet known of Harry's father Richard Bartlett. More is known of his mother, Mary Ann Ribouleau Perrers (b. May 1814 in Holsworthy, Devon – c. 13 June 1902) the first born of Capt. Henry Wilson Perrers of H.M. Navy and Lucy Collins. Mary Ann's middle name of Ribouleau was in honour of her father’s first wife, Rachel Ribouleau (1764-1812) who had died just 6 months into the marriage. Rachel was the sister of then Captain, later Vice-Admiral Peter Ribouleau (1768-1847). It is likely that Captain Peter Ribouleau was Mary Ann's godfather. Peter Ribouleau's wife and only child (a daughter) had predeceased him in 1845, leaving him as the last male Ribouleau descendant of his and Rachel's great-grandfather Etienne/Stephen Ribouleau. Etienne had been a French Protestant Huguenot who fled his native Ile de Ré in France, was granted denization in England in 1687, and settled as a distiller in Hammersmith outside London. The only trace of the Ribouleau name left in England is Riboleau (sic) Street in Ryde on the Isle of Wight, where Admiral Peter Ribouleau had had his large country property.

Harry Bartlett married Anne Ferrett (née Dennis) (1824–1890) on 19 March 1864. She was the widow of John Ferrett ( – 6 November 1860) of Angaston and already had five children; they had three more together: Lucy Ann, Emily Ribouleau, and William John.

Harry moved to Germein Street, Semaphore in 1904. He married (Henrietta) Minna Schultze "his true wife" (c. 1861 – 12 December 1951) on 21 March 1910.

His sister (Amelia) Lucy Bartlett (1840 – 6 October 1914) married Frederick Samuel Sison (c. 1831 – 29 December 1891) of the brewing firm Syme & Sison (Sison and Bartlett went fishing and shooting together; Bartlett was remembered in Sison's will) and lived at Boston House, Port Lincoln; she married again, to Edmund P. G. Oswald (1841 – 19 January 1900) on 1 November 1899.
