= Max Lamshed =

South Australian journalist, historian and Red Cross official

- Born: Maxwell Robert Arthur Lamshed; 5 April 1901; Mount Gambier, South Australia
- Died: 25 July 1971 (aged 70); Crafers, South Australia
- Occupations: Journalist and historian
- Spouse: Christine Joyce Davis (m. 1940)
- Children: 4

Maxwell Robert Arthur "Max" Lamshed OBE (5 April 1901 – 25 July 1971), occasionally written as "M. R. Lamshed", was a South Australian journalist, historian and Red Cross official.

== History ==
Max was born in Rendelsham the only son of carpenter and builder Arthur J. Lamshed, whose parents emigrated to South Australia in the 1850s, and was educated at Mount Gambier High School

His father was at Robe for 18 years, Rendelsham from around 1896 to 1906, where he was an active member of the local cricket team, then Mount Gambier. Max too was a keen cricketer.

Max was employed by The Border Watch then in 1923 moved to The Adelaide Advertiser. He became a feature writer, then News Editor, Assistant Manager and finally Promotions Manager. While working, he continued studying in his spare time, performing credibly.

He was seconded by The Advertiser to the 1933 University of Adelaide anthropological expedition to the western MacDonnell Ranges, Mann Ranges and Musgrave Ranges.

In 1940 Max Lamshed wrote a piece for the Border Watch on the work of the Red Cross. From 1943 to 1955 he was honorary organizer for the Food for Britain campaign in South Australia, and for this service was appointed OBE in 1950. From 1958 to 1963 he was chairman of the South Australian Division of the Red Cross Society.

He was appointed Press Officer to H.M the Queen Mother for her 1964 Australian tour. He retired from The Advertiser in 1964 to accept a position as administrator for the Adelaide Festival of Arts, helping organise the 1966 and 1968 Festivals.

Other interests included the Adelaide Eisteddfod Society, of which he was chairman from 1961 to 1966; he was a member of the Stirling District Council, a member of the National Parks Commission of SA; a governor of the Adelaide Botanic Garden; and a member of the Board of Governors for the Morialta Children's Home. He was a member of Rotary International and an occasional contributor to The Rotarian.

== Family ==
Max married Christine Joyce Davis ( – ) on 9 March 1940. They had two sons and two daughters, and lived at Crafers in the Adelaide Hills.

== Bibliography ==
- The River's Bounty – a history of Barmera and its people 1952 *
- The Hardy Tradition – tracing the growth and development of a great wine-making family through its first hundred years 1953 *
- Years to Remember – 1854–1954 : a record of the first hundred years of the business of D. and J. Fowler Limited 1954 *
- The People's Garden: A Centenary History of the Adelaide Botanic Garden Government Printer, Adelaide 1955
- The Seppelt Story 1851–1951 1958 *
- The South Australian Story – a century of progress (illust. mostly by W. Sanders) Advertiser Newspapers Limited, Adelaide 1958 *
- Adelaide Sketchbook (with Jeanette McLeod) Rigby 1967 ISBN 0727008064
- South East Sketchbook (with Ken Robins) Rigby 1970 ISBN 0851791271
- Adelaide Hills Sketchbook (with Jeanette McLeod) Rigby 1971 ISBN 0851791603
- Prospect: 1872–1972 : a portrait of a city Corporation of the City of Prospect, Adelaide 1972
- Monty – the biography of C. P. Mountford Rigby Limited 1972 ISBN 0851794270

* Lamshed's authorship of these histories was revealed on the flyleaf of Monty.

== Further reading (or listening) ==
Radio interview with Max Lamshed by Lynne Arnold.
