= Electoral district of Yorke Peninsula =

Former South Australian state electoral district

Yorke Peninsula South Australia—House of Assembly
- State: South Australia
- Dates current: 1844–1902, 1915–1970
- Namesake: Yorke Peninsula
- Demographic: Rural
- Coordinates: 34°21′S 137°37′E

Yorke Peninsula was an electoral district of the House of Assembly in the Australian state (colony until 1901) of South Australia from 1884 to 1902 and from 1915 to 1970.

The Yorke Peninsula area formed the newly created seat of Goyder at the 1970 election.

== Members ==
Two members (1884–1902)
| Member | Party | Term | Member | Party | Term |
|---|---|---|---|---|---|
| William Beaglehole | | 1884–1887 | Robert Caldwell | | 1884–1890 |
| Harry Bartlett | | 1887–1896 | Robert Caldwell | | 1884–1890 |
| Harry Bartlett | | 1887–1896 | Henry Lamshed | | 1890–1893 |
| Harry Bartlett | | 1887–1896 | Arthur Short | | 1893–1896 |
| John Shannon | | 1896–1902 | William Copley | National League | 1896–1902 |

Two members (1915–1938)
| Member | Party | Term | Member | Party | Term |
|---|---|---|---|---|---|
| Peter Allen | Liberal Union | 1915–1923 | Henry Tossell | Liberal Union | 1915–1923 |
| Peter Allen | Liberal Federation | 1923–1925 | Henry Tossell | Liberal Federation | 1923–1930 |
| Edward Giles | Liberal Federation | 1926–1932 | Henry Tossell | Liberal Federation | 1923–1930 |
| Edward Giles | Liberal Federation | 1926–1932 | Baden Pattinson | Liberal Federation | 1930–1932 |
| Edward Giles | Liberal and Country | 1932–1933 | Baden Pattinson | Liberal and Country | 1932–1938 |
| Daniel Davies | Independent | 1933–1938 | Baden Pattinson | Liberal and Country | 1932–1938 |

Single member (1938–1970)
| Member | Party | Term |
|---|---|---|
| Daniel Davies | Independent | 1938–1941 |
| Cecil Hincks | Liberal and Country | 1941–1963 |
| James Ferguson | Liberal and Country | 1963–1970 |
