= Troy Stolz =

Australian whistleblower and gambling reform advocate

Councillor for Upper Hunter Shire
- Incumbent
- Assumed office 14 September 2024

Personal details
- Born: 1968 or 1969 (age 57–58)
- Party: Independent
- Other political affiliations: Liberal (formerly); Pauline Hanson's One Nation (2026)

Troy Graham Stolz is an Australian whistleblower, gambling reform advocate and politician. He is currently serving as a councillor for the Upper Hunter Shire since the 2024 New South Wales local government elections.

He was the head of ClubsNSW's anti-money-laundering and counter-terrorism unit until 2019. He leaked an internal report that stated that 95% of registered clubs in New South Wales were non-compliant with anti-money-laundering and counter-terrorism laws.

== ClubsNSW lawsuit ==
Stolz was sued by ClubsNSW, with the former employer arguing that he owed a duty of confidence, and that Stolz had used confidential documents in his consulting work after leaving ClubsNSW. The charges were settled shortly after ClubsNSW's CEO was fired.

The decision to sue Stolz was widely criticised in the press, with casino mogul James Packer calling the lawsuit "ruthless [and] unethical".

As part of the lawsuit, ClubsNSW obtained injunctive relief restraining Stolz from speaking about the conduct of ClubsNSW in a way that could "bring improper pressure on the respondent". After an interview with YouTuber Jordan Shanks, both Stolz and Shanks were the target of criminal contempt of court proceedings for violating the restraining order, with ClubsNSW acting as a private prosecutor. These charges were dropped in February 2023.

== Political career ==
Stolz ran as an independent candidate in Kogarah against at the 2023 New South Wales state election, campaigning on a platform of cashless gaming reform. His candidacy directly opposed Labor leader, Chris Minns, running for the same seat. Stolz called on the Labor leader to join in on the Liberal Party's plan to transition New South Wales to cashless pokies by 2028. Minns expressed reticence due to potential risks of exacerbating money loss during gambling. Stolz placed fourth, garnering 2,186 votes, or 4.3% of the votes.

In the 2024 New South Wales local government elections, Stolz ran as a councillor for the Upper Hunter Shire. He was elected in fourth place, garnering a total of 893 votes, or 10.9%.

In January 2026, Stolz joined One Nation, but subsequently left the party after only four days.

== Other advocacy ==
In November 2023, Stolz joined other whistleblowers in an open letter condemning the prosecution of Australian Army whistleblower David McBride.

== Personal life ==
Stolz is battling stage four bone cancer as of 7 February 2023.
