= George Peponis =

Australia international rugby league footballer

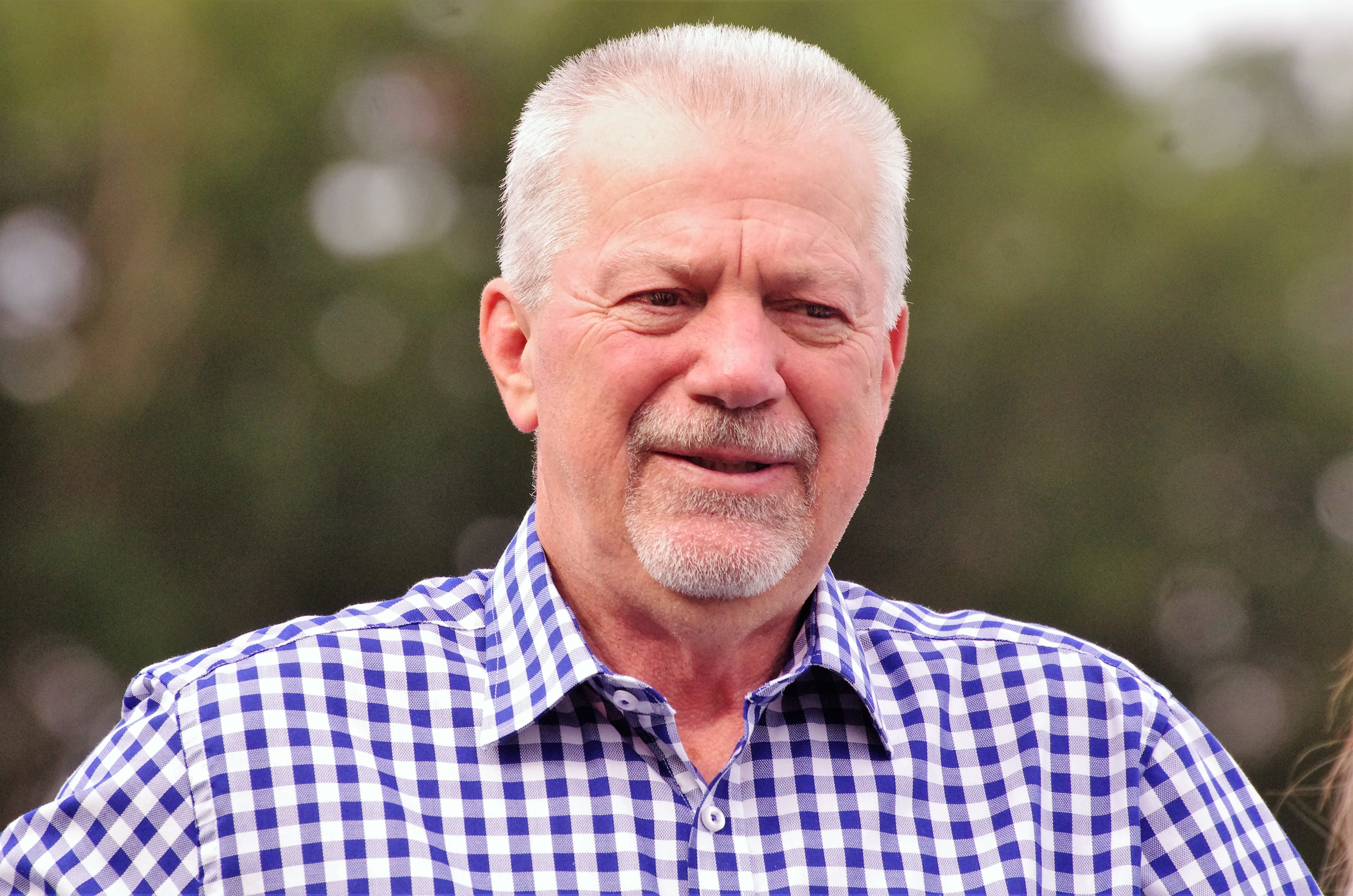

Personal information
- Full name: Georgios Peponis
- Born: 3 September 1953 (age 72) Tripoli, Greece

Playing information
- Height: 179 cm (5 ft 10 in)
- Weight: 80 kg (12 st 8 lb)
- Position: Hooker
Club
Years	Team	Pld	T	G	FG	P
1974–82	Canterbury-Bankstown	132	27	0	0	81
Representative
Years	Team	Pld	T	G	FG	P
1976–80	New South Wales	8	3	0	0	9
1978–80	Australia	8	2	0	0	8
1977–80	NSW City	3	0	0	0	0

George Peponis (born Georgios Peponis, Greek: Γιώργος Πεπόνης; born 3 September 1953) is a Greek Australian company director and former professional rugby league footballer who played in the 1970s and 1980s. An Australia national and New South Wales state representative hooker, he played in the NSWRFL Premiership for the Canterbury-Bankstown Bulldogs, with whom he won the 1980 Grand Final. He also captained the Bulldogs and New South Wales, and played in eight Test matches for Australia between 1978 and 1980, captaining the side on five consecutive occasions between 1979 and 1980.

== Background ==
Peponis was born on 3 September 1953, in the town of Tripoli, Arcadia in the Peloponnese region in Greece, to Greek parents who originally came from the small Arcadian village of Levidi, on the outskirts of Tripoli. He emigrated with his family to Australia when he was just 18 months old in 1954 like many other Greeks in those days. He attended Sydney's Canterbury Boys' High School where he played rugby union and was a Canterbury rugby league junior with the St George Dragons JRLFC at Clemton Park before being graded in 1973 to the under-23's side in which year he played in the Preliminary Final against the Balmain Tigers.

== Professional playing career ==
=== 1970s ===
Peponis started the 1974 season in reserve grade and that year debuted in first grade against South Sydney when Barry Phillis was injured. He stayed in first grade for that year's finals series including Canterbury's Grand Final 1974 loss to the Eastern Suburbs.

After a 1975 season interrupted by a broken leg injury, for the next five seasons from 1976 he was Canterbury's regular first grade hooker. The Canterbury club maintained a scholarship scheme for its juniors at the time which supported him financially while he conducted his medical studies.

Peponis made his state debut for the New South Wales Blues in 1976 and would go on to play seven games for his state up till 1980.

In 1978, Peponis was appointed Canterbury's first-grade captain and played in the Preliminary Semi-Final against the Parramatta Eels. He would go on to captain Canterbury on 71 occasions between 1978 and 1982. As a hooker he was a consistent winner of possession in those days of contested scrums and was known for his trademark ability to burrow over for tries from the dummy half position. He made his Test debut for Australia in 1978 in the first Test against New Zealand. He was vying for the Australian hooker position with Max Krilich and Queensland's Johnny Lang and would in his career regularly compete against Krilich for representative honours. He was selected for the 1978 Kangaroo tour on which he played two Tests, four minor tour matches and scored six tries.

In 1979, after the playing retirement of Bob Fulton, he took over as state captain of New South Wales and that same year was selected as Kangaroo captain for the domestic Ashes series against Great Britain. Australia's fitness and skill dominance over Great Britain began to show in this series which was a three-nil drubbing to the locals. He led Canterbury to the 1979 Grand Final loss against St George.

=== 1980s ===
After leading Australia to victory in two Tests in the 1980 tour of New Zealand, Peponis attained the career record of captaining Australia on five successive occasions to a clean record of five wins. Peponis was captain of Canterbury in their 18-4 1980 premiership victory over Eastern Suburbs.

Persistent neck injuries hampered the remainder of Peponis' career and he retired midway through the 1982 season.

== Post playing ==
A medical practitioner, Peponis remained involved with the game through FootyTAB promotions and being on the NRL Drugs Tribunal. He was elected Chairman of the Bulldogs Football Club following the club's salary cap scandal in 2002 when they were penalised 37 competition points and fined $500,000 for systematically breaching the cap. In 2007, Peponis was still the chairman and was in charge when personally difficult decisions were made which saw his former 1980 Grand Final teammates Garry Hughes and Steve Mortimer forced out of their positions with the club.

Peponis was named at hooker in the 'Berries to Bulldogs 70 Year Team of Champions' in 2004. He is a Life Member of the Football Club and in 2007 was inducted into the Bulldogs Ring of Champions.

Dr Peponis was Chairman of the NSW Rugby League from 2012 to 2022. He was elected as a Director of ClubsNSW in 2017 and was appointed to the position of deputy chair in 2018. He was elected as Chairman of the ClubsNSW Board after Peter Newell resigned his position in June 2019.

Sporting positions
Preceded by Bob Fulton	Captain Australia; 1979-80	Succeeded by Steve Rogers
