= Labor Against War =

Political group within the Australian Labor Party

Labor Against War is a political group within the Australian Labor Party.

It was established in 2023 as a movement organised in opposition to the AUKUS security pact. It describes itself as a "grassroots network of labor members and unionists opposed to Australia being dragged into another US-led war".

The convenor of the group is Marcus Strom, a unionist and former media advisor to Ed Husic.

The group has attempted to organise branches of the Labor Party in passing resolutions condemning AUKUS and the proposed nuclear submarine program. It has been associated with party-conference motions that have opposed the alliance.
