= Australian Labor Party =

Political party in Australia

- Abbreviation: ALP
- Leader: Anthony Albanese
- Deputy Leader: Richard Marles
- Senate Leader: Penny Wong
- National President: Kate Ellis
- National Secretary: Paul Erickson
- Founded: Oldest branches: 1891; 135 years ago; Federal Caucus: 8 May 1901; 125 years ago
- Headquarters: 5/9 Sydney Avenue, Barton, Australian Capital Territory
- Think tank: Chifley Research Centre
- Youth wing: Australian Young Labor
- Women's wing: Labor Women's Network
- LGBT+ wing: Rainbow Labor
- Indigenous wing: Aboriginal Labor Network
- Overseas wing: ALP Abroad
- Investment arm: John Curtin House
- Membership (2026): ▼55,000
- Ideology: De facto: Social democracy; Labourism; De jure: Democratic socialism
- Political position: Centre-left
- Regional affiliation: Network of Social Democracy in Asia
- International affiliation: Progressive Alliance; Socialist International (1966–2014)
- Factions: Labor Left; Labor Right
- Colours: Red
- Slogan: Building Australia's Future
- Governing body: ALP National Executive
- Party conference: ALP National Conference
- Parliamentary party: ALP Caucus
- Party branches: ACT; NSW; NT; Qld; SA; Tas; Vic; WA
- House of Representatives: 94 / 150
- Senate: 30 / 76
- State/territory governments: 5 / 8
- State/territory lower houses: 267 / 465
- State upper houses: 65 / 156

Website
- alp.org.au

The Australian Labor Party (ALP) is the major social democratic political party in Australia. Sitting on the centre-left of the political spectrum, it is the oldest active party in the country, having been founded in 1891. It is one of the two major parties in Australian politics, its main rival being the Liberal–National Coalition. It has been the ruling party at the federal level since the 2022 federal election, and currently forms government in five of the eight states and territories.

The Labor Party was founded in 1891, being descended from the labour parties founded in the various Australian colonies during the emerging labour movement. After its founding, it began contesting colonial elections, and federal elections after Australian federation, beginning with the 1901 federal election. In 1904, it briefly formed what is considered the world's first labour party government and the world's first social democratic or democratic socialist government at a national level, the Watson government. At the 1910 federal election, Labor became the first party in Australia to win a majority in either house of the Australian parliament. In every election since 1910, Labor has either served as the governing party or the opposition.

The Labor Party is often called the party of unions due to its close ties to the labour movement in Australia and historical founding by trade unions, with the majority of Australian trade unions being affiliated with the Labor Party. The party's structure allocates 50% of delegate representation at state and national conferences to affiliated unions, with the remaining 50% to rank-and-file party members. At the federal and state/colony level, the Australian Labor Party predates both the British and New Zealand Labour parties in formation and winning government. Internationally, the ALP is a member of the Progressive Alliance, a network of progressive, democratic socialist and social democratic parties, having previously been a member of the Socialist International.

Catholicism is part of the party's history, even though the connections have weakened over time.

== History ==
=== Name and spelling ===
In standard Australian English, the word labour is spelt with a u. However, the political party uses the spelling Labor, without a u. There was originally no standardised spelling of the party's name, with Labor and Labour both in common usage. According to Ross McMullin, who wrote an official history of the Labor Party, the title page of the proceedings of the Federal Conference used the spelling "Labor" in 1902, "Labour" in 1905 and 1908, and then "Labor" from 1912 onwards. In 1908, James Catts put forward a motion at the Federal Conference that "the name of the party be the Australian Labour Party", which was carried by 22 votes to 2. A separate motion recommending state branches adopt the name was defeated. There was no uniformity of party names until 1918 when the Federal party resolved that state branches should adopt the name "Australian Labor Party", now spelt without a u. Each state branch had previously used a different name, due to their different origins. (Note: According to The Australian Worker, in 1918 the state parties comprised the Political Labor League (New South Wales), the Queensland Labor Party, the United Labor Party (South Australia), the Workers' Political Labor League (Tasmania), the Political Labor Council (Victoria), and the Australian Labor Federation (Western Australia). However, according to the South Australian Register, the state parties in New South Wales, South Australia, and Victoria had already adopted the standardised name by 1917.)

Although the ALP officially adopted the spelling without a u, it took decades for the official spelling to achieve widespread acceptance. (Note: In 1954, Labor MP Ted Johnson complained in the Parliament of Western Australia that both Hansard and the daily newspapers were still using the spelling "Labour". As late as the 1980s, historian Finlay Crisp used the spelling "Labour" in academic works about the party.) According to McMullin, "the way the spelling of 'Labor Party' was consolidated had more to do with the chap who ended up being in charge of printing the federal conference report than any other reason". Some sources have attributed the official choice of Labor to influence from King O'Malley, who was born in the United States and was reputedly an advocate of English-language spelling reform; the spelling without a u is the standard form in American English.

Andrew Scott, who wrote "Running on Empty: 'Modernising' the British and Australian Labour Parties", suggests that the adoption of the spelling without a u "signified one of the ALP's earliest attempts at modernisation", and served the purpose of differentiating the party from the Australian labour movement as a whole and distinguishing it from other British Empire labour parties. The decision to include the word "Australian" in the party's name, rather than just "Labour Party" as in the United Kingdom, Scott attributes to "the greater importance of nationalism for the founders of the colonial parties".

=== Origins ===
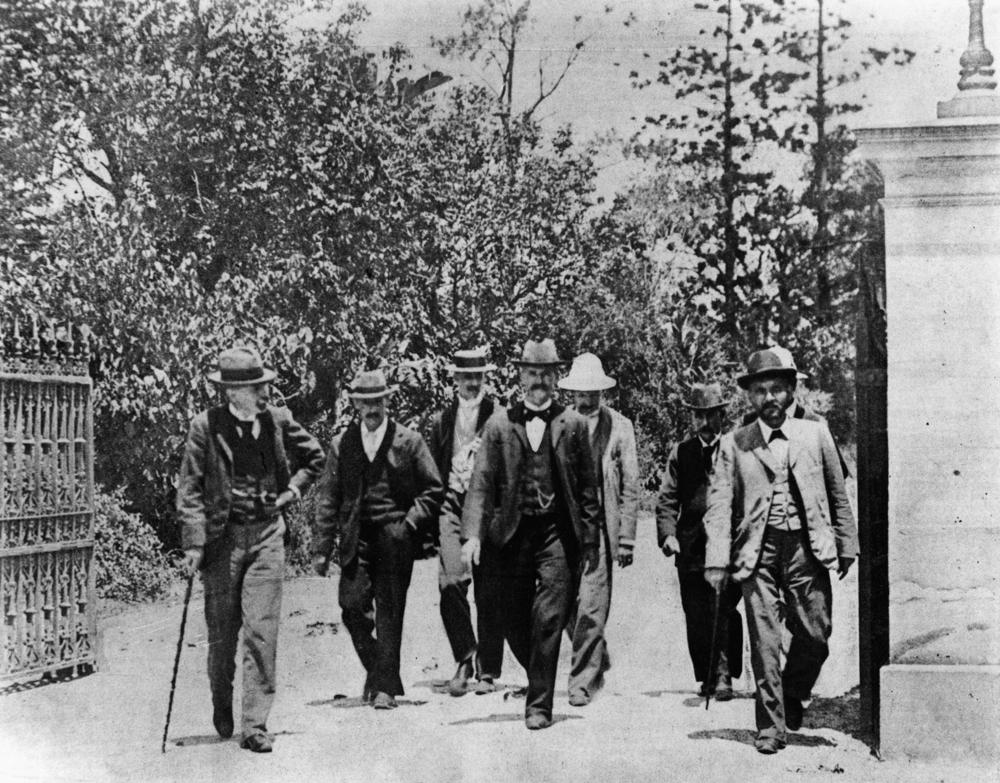
Anderson Dawson's ministry leaving Parliament House, Brisbane, after being sworn in on 1 December 1899. His was the first government formed by a Labour party in the world.

The Australian Labor Party has its origins in the Labour parties founded in the 1890s in the Australian colonies prior to federation. Labor tradition ascribes the founding of Queensland Labour to a meeting of striking pastoral workers under a ghost gum tree (the Tree of Knowledge) in Barcaldine, Queensland in 1891. The 1891 shearers' strike is credited as being one of the factors for the formation of the Australian Labor Party. On 9 September 1892 the Manifesto of the Queensland Labour Party was read out under the well known Tree of Knowledge at Barcaldine following the Great Shearers' Strike. The State Library of Queensland now holds the manifesto; in 2008 the historic document was added to UNESCO's Memory of the World Australian Register and, in 2009, the document was added to UNESCO's Memory of the World International Register. The Balmain, New South Wales branch of the party claims to be the oldest in Australia. However, the Scone Branch has a receipt for membership fees for the Labour Electoral League dated April 1891. This predates the Balmain claim. This can be attested in the Centenary of the ALP book. Labour as a parliamentary party dates from 1891 in New South Wales and South Australia, 1893 in Queensland, and later in the other colonies.

The first election contested by Labour candidates was the 1891 New South Wales election, when Labour candidates (then called the Labor Electoral League of New South Wales) won 35 of 141 seats. The major parties were the Protectionist and Free Trade parties and Labour held the balance of power. It offered parliamentary support in exchange for policy concessions. The United Labor Party (ULP) of South Australia was founded in 1891, and three candidates were that year elected to the South Australian Legislative Council. The first successful South Australian House of Assembly candidate was John McPherson at the 1892 East Adelaide by-election. Richard Hooper however was elected as an independent Labor candidate at the 1891 Wallaroo by-election, while he was the first labor member of the House of Assembly he was not a member of the newly formed ULP.

At the 1893 South Australian elections, the ULP was immediately elevated to balance of power status with 10 of 54 lower house seats. The liberal government of Charles Kingston was formed with the support of the ULP, ousting the conservative government of John Downer. So successful, less than a decade later at the 1905 state election, Thomas Price formed the world's first stable Labor government. John Verran led Labor to form the state's first of many majority governments at the 1910 state election.

In 1899, Anderson Dawson formed a minority Labour government in Queensland, the first in the world, which lasted one week while the conservatives regrouped after a split.

The colonial Labour parties and the trade unions were mixed in their support for the Federation of Australia. Some Labour representatives argued against the proposed constitution, claiming that the Senate as proposed was too powerful, similar to the anti-reformist colonial upper houses and the British House of Lords. They feared that federation would further entrench the power of the conservative forces. However, the first Labour leader and Prime Minister Chris Watson was a supporter of federation.

Historian Celia Hamilton, examining New South Wales, argues for the central role of Irish Catholics. Before 1890, they opposed Henry Parkes, the main Liberal leader, and of free trade, seeing them both as the ideals of Protestant Englishmen who represented landholding and large business interests. In the strike of 1890 the leading Catholic, Sydney's Archbishop Francis Moran was sympathetic toward unions, but Catholic newspapers were negative. After 1900, says Hamilton, Irish Catholics were drawn to the Labour Party because its stress on equality and social welfare fitted with their status as manual labourers and small farmers. In the 1910 elections Labour gained in the more Catholic areas and the representation of Catholics increased in Labour's parliamentary ranks.

=== Early decades at the federal level ===
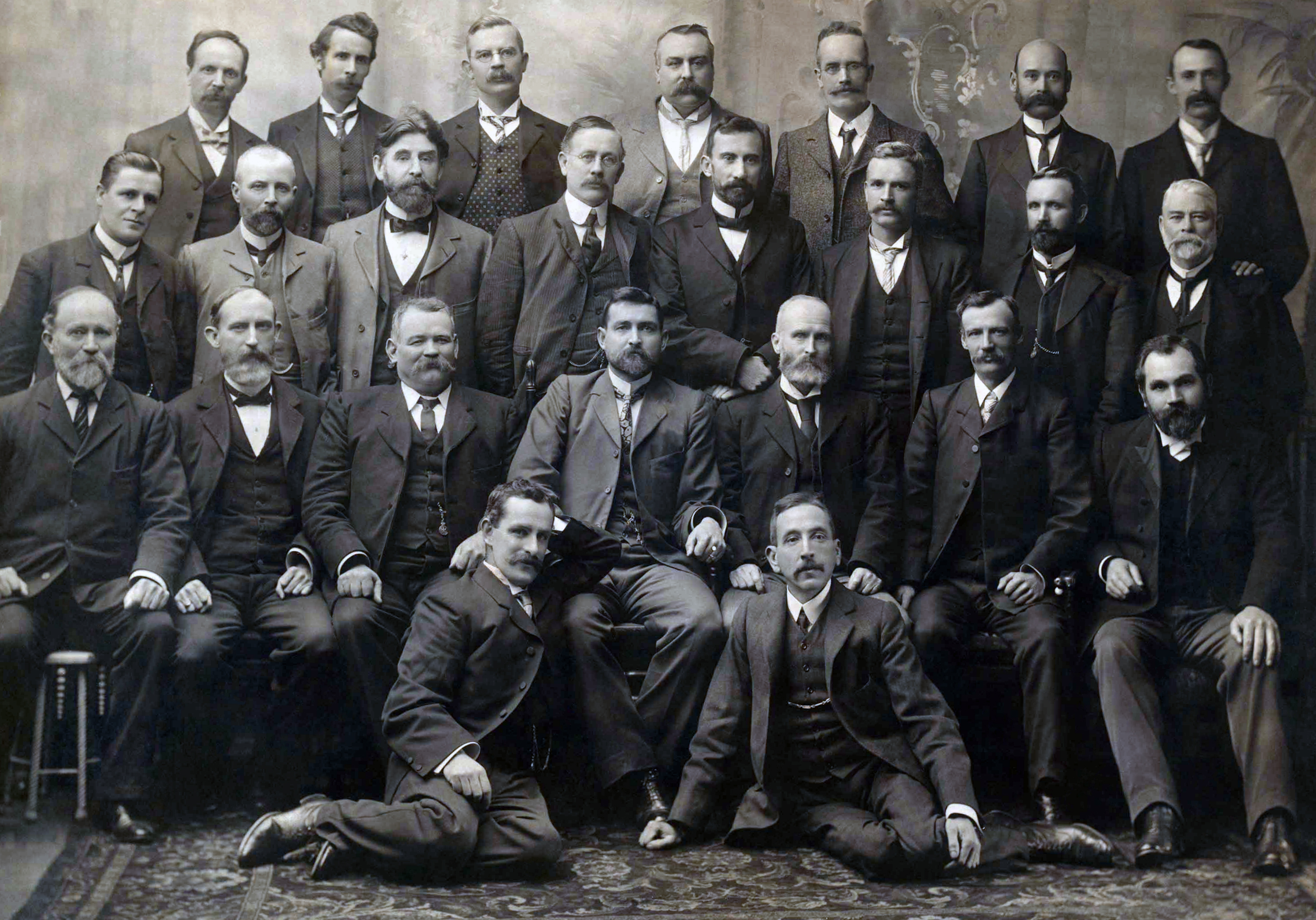
Group photograph of federal Labour Party MPs elected to the House of Representatives and Senate at the inaugural 1901 election

The federal parliament in 1901 was contested by each state Labour Party. In total, they won 15 of the 75 seats in the House of Representatives, collectively holding the balance of power, and the Labour members now met as the Federal Parliamentary Labour Party (informally known as the caucus) on 8 May 1901 at Parliament House, Melbourne, the meeting place of the first federal Parliament. The caucus decided to support the incumbent Protectionist Party in minority government, while the Free Trade Party formed the opposition. It was some years before there was any significant structure or organisation at a national level. Labour under Chris Watson doubled its vote at the 1903 federal election and continued to hold the balance of power. In April 1904, however, Watson and Alfred Deakin fell out over the issue of extending the scope of industrial relations laws concerning the Conciliation and Arbitration bill to cover state public servants, the fallout causing Deakin to resign. Free Trade leader George Reid declined to take office, which saw Watson become the first Labour Prime Minister of Australia, and the world's first Labour head of government at a national level (Anderson Dawson had led a short-lived Labour government in Queensland in December 1899), though his was a minority government that lasted only four months. He was aged only 37, and is still the youngest prime minister in Australia's history.

George Reid of the Free Trade Party adopted a strategy of trying to reorient the party system along Labour vs. non-Labour lines prior to the 1906 federal election and renamed his Free Trade Party to the Anti-Socialist Party. Reid envisaged a spectrum running from socialist to anti-socialist, with the Protectionist Party in the middle. This attempt struck a chord with politicians who were steeped in the Westminster tradition and regarded a two-party system as very much the norm.

Although Watson led the party to a plurality victory (though not government, thanks to the union of Free Traders and Protectionists) in 1906, he stepped down from the leadership the following year, to be succeeded by Andrew Fisher's minority government for seven months until it fell in June 1909. At the 1910 federal election, Fisher led Labor to victory, forming Australia's first elected federal majority government, Australia's first elected Senate majority, the world's first Labour Party majority government at a national level, and after the 1904 Chris Watson minority government the world's second Labour Party government at a national level. It was the first time a Labour Party had controlled any house of a legislature, and the first time the party controlled both houses of a bicameral legislature. The state branches were also successful, except in Victoria, where the strength of Deakinite liberalism inhibited the party's growth. The state branches formed their first majority governments in New South Wales and South Australia in 1910, Western Australia in 1911, Queensland in 1915 and Tasmania in 1925. Such success eluded the other Commonwealth Labour parties for another decade; the Labour Party in Great Britain would not form even a minority government until 1924, and would have to wait another twenty-one years to win a majority in its own right. Even in neighbouring New Zealand, Labour would not take power until 1935. In Canada, a national labour party was not even formed until 1932 and never formed government.

One of the first members of the NSW Labor caucus described themselves as "a band of unhappy amateurs", made up of blue collar workers, a squatter, a doctor, and even a mine owner, indicating that Labor was formed of more than just unions. In addition, many members from the working class supported the liberal notion of free trade between the colonies; in the first grouping of state MPs, 17 of the 35 were free-traders.

In the aftermath of World War I and the Russian Revolution of 1917, support for socialism grew in trade union ranks, and at the 1921 All-Australian Trades Union Congress a resolution was passed calling for "the socialisation of industry, production, distribution and exchange". The 1922 Labor Party National Conference adopted a similarly worded socialist objective which remained official policy for many years. The resolution was immediately qualified, however, by the Blackburn amendment, which said that "socialisation" was desirable only when was necessary to "eliminate exploitation and other anti-social features". Only once has a federal Labor government attempted to nationalise any industry (Ben Chifley's bank nationalisation of 1947), and that was held by the High Court to be unconstitutional. The commitment to nationalisation was dropped by Gough Whitlam, and Bob Hawke's government carried out the floating of the dollar. Privatisation of state enterprises such as Qantas airways and the Commonwealth Bank was carried out by the Paul Keating government.

The Labor Party is commonly described as a social democratic party, and its constitution stipulates that it is a democratic socialist party. The party was created by, and has always been influenced by, the trade unions, and in practice its policy at any given time has usually been the policy of the broader labour movement. Thus at the first federal election 1901 Labor's platform called for a White Australia policy, a citizen army and compulsory arbitration of industrial disputes. Labor has at various times supported high tariffs and low tariffs, conscription and pacifism, White Australia and multiculturalism, nationalisation and privatisation, isolationism and internationalism.

From 1900 to 1940, Labor and its affiliated unions were strong defenders of the White Australia policy, which banned all non-European migration to Australia. This policy was motivated by fears of economic competition from low-wage overseas workers In practice the Labor party opposed all migration, on the grounds that immigrants competed with Australian workers and drove down wages, until after World War II, when the Chifley government launched a major immigration program. The party's opposition to non-European immigration did not change until after the retirement of Arthur Calwell as leader in 1967. Subsequently, Labor has become an advocate of multiculturalism.

=== World War II and beyond ===
The Curtin and Chifley governments governed Australia through the latter half of the Second World War and initial stages of transition to peace. Labor leader John Curtin became prime minister in October 1941 when two independents crossed the floor of Parliament. Labor, led by Curtin, then led Australia through the years of the Pacific War. In December 1941, Curtin announced that "Australia looks to America, free of any pangs as to our traditional links or kinship with the United Kingdom", thus helping to establish the Australian-American alliance (later formalised as ANZUS by the Menzies government). Remembered as a strong war time leader and for a landslide win at the 1943 federal election, Curtin died in office just prior to the end of the war and was succeeded by Ben Chifley. Chifley Labor won the 1946 federal election and oversaw Australia's initial transition to a peacetime economy.

At the conference of the New South Wales Labor Party in June 1949, Chifley sought to define the labour movement as follows: "We have a great objective – the light on the hill – which we aim to reach by working for the betterment of mankind. ... [Labor would] bring something better to the people, better standards of living, greater happiness to the mass of the people." To a large extent, Chifley saw centralisation of the economy as the means to achieve such ambitions. With an increasingly uncertain economic outlook, after his attempt to nationalise the banks and a strike by the Communist-dominated Miners' Federation, Chifley lost office at the 1949 federal election to Robert Menzies' Liberal-National Coalition. Labor commenced a 23-year period in opposition. The party was primarily led during this time by H. V. Evatt and Arthur Calwell.

In 1955, the Australian Labor Party split, and the Democratic Labour Party (DLP) was formed. The preferences of the DLP were used to keep the ALP in Opposition until the election of Gough Whitlam in 1972.

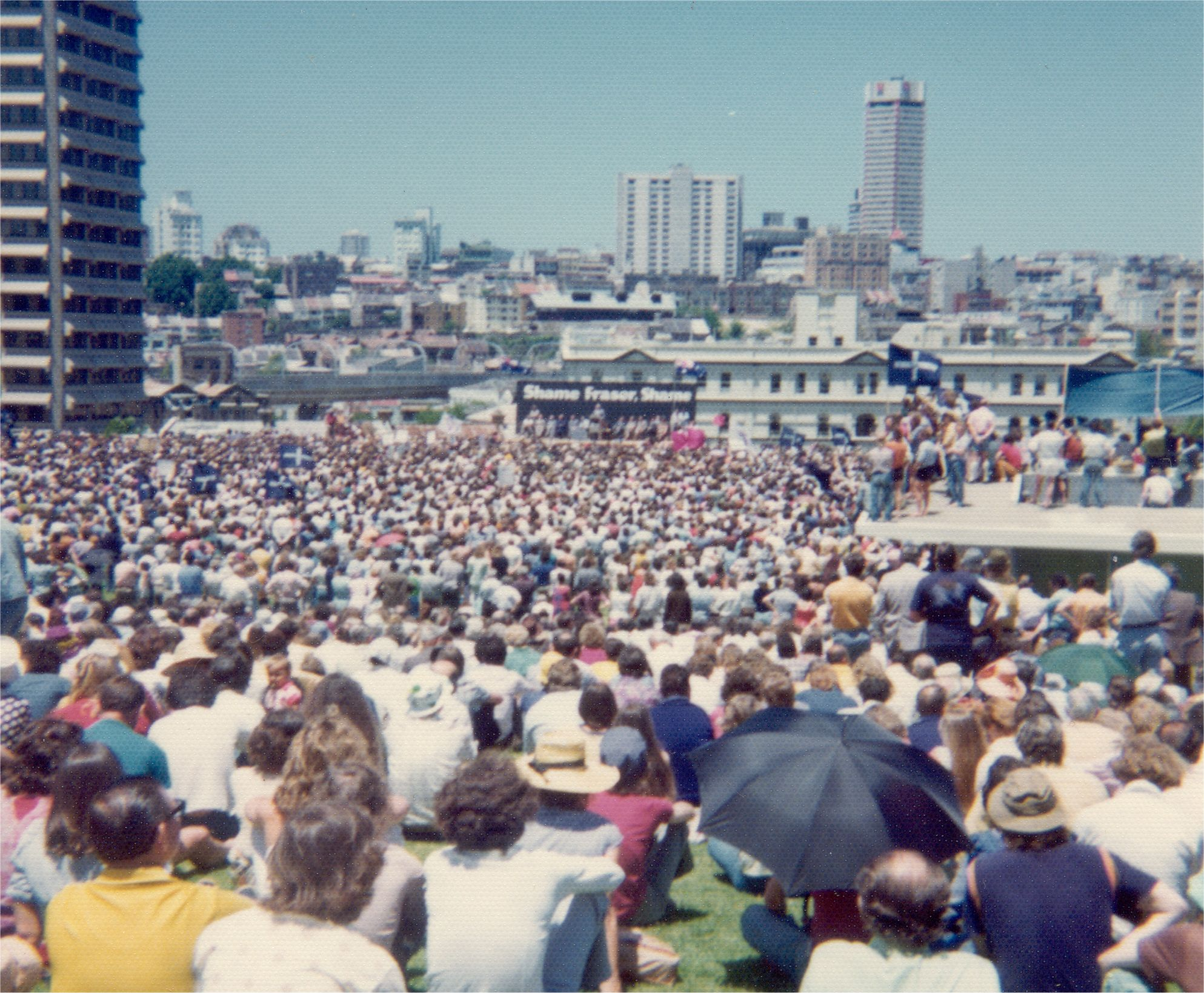
Labor Party policy launch before a crowd in the Sydney Domain on 24 November 1975

Various ideological beliefs were factionalised under reforms to the ALP under Gough Whitlam, resulting in what is now known as the Socialist Left who tend to favour a more interventionist economic policy and more socially progressive ideals, and Labor Right, the now dominant faction that tends to be more economically liberal and focus to a lesser extent on social issues. The Whitlam Labor government, marking a break with Labor's socialist tradition, pursued social democratic policies rather than democratic socialist policies. In contrast to earlier Labor leaders, Whitlam also cut tariffs by 25 percent. Whitlam led the Federal Labor Party back to office at the 1972 and 1974 federal elections, and passed a large amount of legislation. The Whitlam government lost office following the 1975 Australian constitutional crisis and dismissal by Governor-General John Kerr after the Coalition blocked supply in the Senate after a series of political scandals, and was defeated at the 1975 federal election in the largest landslide of Australian federal history. Whitlam remains the only Prime Minister to have his commission terminated in that manner. Whitlam also lost the 1977 federal election and subsequently resigned as leader.

Bill Hayden succeeded Whitlam as leader. At the 1980 federal election, the party achieved a big swing, though the unevenness of the swing around the nation prevented an ALP victory. In 1983, Bob Hawke became leader of the party after Hayden resigned to avoid a leadership spill.

Bob Hawke led Labor back to office at the 1983 federal election and the party won four consecutive elections under Hawke. In December 1991 Paul Keating defeated Bob Hawke in a leadership spill. The ALP then won the 1993 federal election. It was in power for five terms over 13 years, until severely defeated by John Howard at the 1996 federal election. This was the longest period the party has ever been in government at the national level.

Kim Beazley led the party to the 1998 federal election, winning 51 percent of the two-party-preferred vote but falling short on seats, and the ALP lost ground at the 2001 federal election. After a brief period when Simon Crean served as ALP leader, Mark Latham led Labor to the 2004 federal election but lost further ground. Beazley replaced Latham in 2005; not long afterwards he in turn was forced out of the leadership by Kevin Rudd.

Rudd went on to defeat John Howard at the 2007 federal election with 52.7 percent of the two-party vote (Howard became the first prime minister since Stanley Bruce to lose not just the election but his own parliamentary seat). The Rudd government ended prior to the 2010 federal election with the overthrow of Rudd as leader of the party by deputy leader Julia Gillard. Gillard, who was also the first woman to serve as prime minister of Australia, remained prime minister in a hung parliament following the election. Her government lasted until 2013, when Gillard lost a leadership spill, with Rudd becoming leader once again. Later that year the ALP lost the 2013 federal election.

Membership of the Australian Labor Party (1948–present)
Members

Between the 2007 federal election and the 2008 Western Australian state election, Labor was in government nationally and in all eight state and territory parliaments. This was the first time any single party or any coalition had achieved this since the ACT and the NT gained self-government. Labor narrowly lost government in Western Australia at the 2008 state election and Victoria at the 2010 state election. These losses were further compounded by landslide defeats in New South Wales in 2011, Queensland in 2012, the Northern Territory in 2012, Federally in 2013 and Tasmania in 2014. Labor retained government in the Australian Capital Territory in 2012 and, despite losing its majority, the party retained government in South Australia in 2014.

However, most of these reversals proved only temporary with Labor returning to government in Victoria in 2014 and in Queensland in 2015 after spending only one term in opposition in both states. Furthermore, after winning the 2014 Fisher by-election by nine votes from a 7.3 percent swing, the Labor government in South Australia went from minority to majority government. Labor won landslide victories in the 2016 Northern Territory election, the 2017 Western Australian election and the 2018 Victorian state election. However, Labor lost the 2018 South Australian state election after 16 years in government.

After Labor's 2013 federal election defeat, Bill Shorten became leader of the party. The party narrowly lost the 2016 election, yet gained 14 seats. Despite favourable polling, the party also did not return to government in the 2019 New South Wales state election or the 2019 federal election. The latter has been considered a historic upset due to Labor's consistent and significant polling lead; the result has been likened to the Coalition's loss in the 1993 federal election, with 2019 retrospectively referred to in the media as the "unloseable election". After the 2019 defeat, Shorten resigned from the leadership, though he remained in parliament. Anthony Albanese was elected as leader unopposed.

In March 2022, Labor returned to government in South Australia after defeating the Liberal Party in the 2022 South Australian state election.

Anthony Albanese led the party into the 2022 Australian federal election, in which the party returned to power with a majority government. Despite its win, Labor nevertheless recorded its lowest primary vote since either 1903 or 1934, depending on whether the Lang Labor vote is included. Albanese later led the party into the 2025 Australian federal election, in which the party once again won a majority government in a historical landslide.

In 2023, Labor won the March 2023 New South Wales state election returning to government for the first time since 2011. This victory marked the first time in 15 years that Labor were in government in all mainland states. In 2024, Labor lost in a landslide in the 2024 Northern Territory election, losing its first mainland state or territory since the 2018 South Australian election. Labor would also lose in the 2024 Queensland state election.

== Party structure ==
=== National executive and secretariat ===
The National Executive is the party's chief administrative authority, subject only to Labor's national conference. The executive is responsible for organising the triennial national conference; carrying out the decisions of the conference; interpreting the national constitution, the national platform and decisions of the national conference; and directing federal members.

The party holds a national conference every three years, which consists of delegates representing the state and territory branches (many coming from affiliated trade unions, although there is no formal requirement for unions to be represented at the national conference). The national conference decides the party's platform, elects the national executive and appoints office-bearers such as the national secretary, who also serves as national campaign director during elections. The current national secretary is Paul Erickson. The head office of the ALP, the national secretariat, is managed by the national secretary. It plays a dual role of administration and a national campaign strategy. It acts as a permanent secretariat to the national executive by managing and assisting in all administrative affairs of the party. As the national secretary also serves as national campaign director during elections, it is also responsible for the national campaign strategy and organisation.

=== Federal Parliamentary Labor Party ===
The elected members of the Labor party in both houses of the national Parliament meet as the Federal Parliamentary Labor Party, also known as the Caucus (see also caucus). Besides discussing parliamentary business and tactics, the Caucus also is involved in the election of the federal parliamentary leaders.

=== Federal parliamentary leaders ===
Until 2013, the parliamentary leaders were elected by the Caucus from among its members. The leader has historically been a member of the House of Representatives. Since October 2013, a ballot of both the Caucus and by the Labor Party's rank-and-file members determined the party leader and the deputy leader. When the Labor Party is in government, the party leader is the prime minister and the deputy leader is the deputy prime minister. If a Labor prime minister resigns or dies in office, the deputy leader acts as prime minister and party leader until a successor is elected. The deputy prime minister also acts as prime minister when the prime minister is on leave or out of the country. Members of the Ministry are also chosen by Caucus, though the leader may allocate portfolios to the ministers.

Anthony Albanese is the leader of the federal Labor party, serving since 30 May 2019. The deputy leader is Richard Marles, also serving since 30 May 2019.

=== Australian Young Labor ===
Australian Young Labor is the youth wing of the Australian Labor Party, where all members under age 26 are automatically members. It is the peak youth body within the party, and an Equity Group within all state and territory branches. Former presidents of AYL have included former NSW Premier Bob Carr, Federal Leader of the House Tony Burke, former Special Minister of State Senator John Faulkner, former Australian Workers Union National Secretary, former Member for Maribyrnong and former Federal Labor Leader Bill Shorten, as well as dozens of State Ministers and MPs. The current National President is Chris Hancock, from Queensland.

=== Country Labor ===
The Country Labor Party, commonly known as Country Labor, was an affiliated organisation of the Labor Party. Although not expressly defined, Country Labor operated mainly within rural New South Wales, and was mainly seen as an extension of the New South Wales branch that operates in rural electorates.

Country Labor was used as a designation by candidates contesting elections in rural areas. The Country Labor Party was registered as a separate party in New South Wales, and was also registered with the Australian Electoral Commission (AEC) for federal elections. It did not have the same status in other states and, consequently, that designation could not be used on the ballot paper.

The creation of a separation designation for rural candidates was first suggested at the June 1999 ALP state conference in New South Wales. In May 2000, following Labor's success at the 2000 Benalla by-election in Victoria, Kim Beazley announced that the ALP intended to register a separate "Country Labor Party" with the AEC; this occurred in October 2000. The Country Labor designation was most frequently used in New South Wales. According to the ALP's financial statements for the 2015–16 financial year, NSW Country Labor had around 2,600 members (around 17 percent of the party total), but almost no assets. It recorded a severe funding shortfall at the 2015 New South Wales election, and had to rely on a $1.68-million loan from the party proper to remain solvent. It had been initially assumed that the party proper could provide the money from its own resources, but the NSW Electoral Commission ruled that this was impermissible because the parties were registered separately. Instead the party proper had to loan Country Labor the required funds at a commercial interest rate.

The Country Labor Party was de-registered by the New South Wales Electoral Commission in 2021, however Country Labor still operates as an internal policy action caucus within several state branches.

=== State and territory branches ===
The Australian Labor Party is a federal party, consisting of eight branches from each state and territory. While the National Executive is responsible for national campaign strategy, each state and territory are an autonomous branch and are responsible for campaigning in their own jurisdictions for federal, state and local elections. State and territory branches consist of both individual members and affiliated trade unions, who between them decide the party's policies, elect its governing bodies and choose its candidates for public office.

Members join a state branch and pay a membership fee, which is graduated according to income. The majority of trade unions in Australia are affiliated to the party at a state level. Union affiliation is direct and not through the Australian Council of Trade Unions. Affiliated unions pay an affiliation fee based on the size of their membership. Union affiliation fees make up a large part of the party's income. Other sources of funds for the party include political donations and public funding.

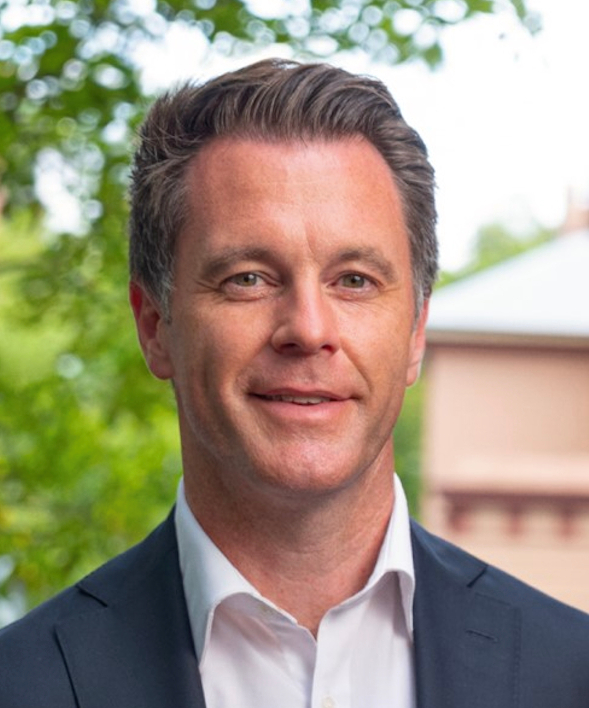
Chris Minns, Premier of New South Wales and Leader of NSW Labor

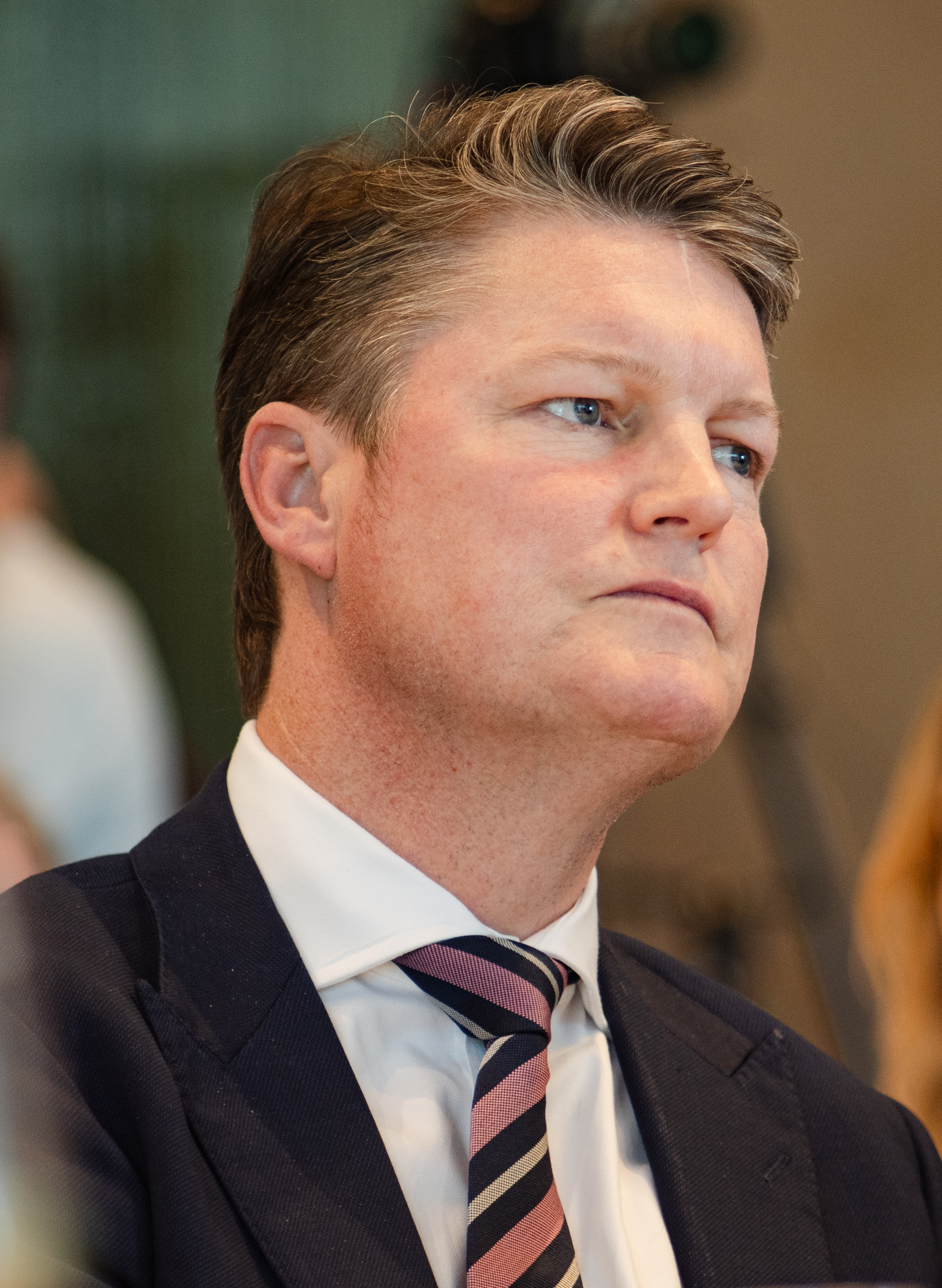
Ben Carroll, Premier of Victoria and Leader of Victorian Labor

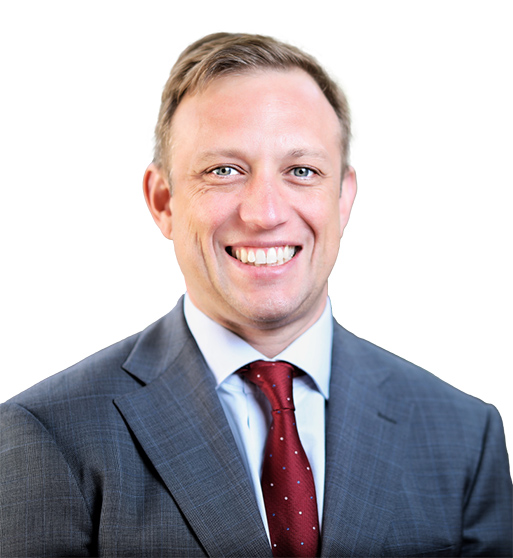
Steven Miles, Leader of the Opposition of Queensland and Leader of Queensland Labor

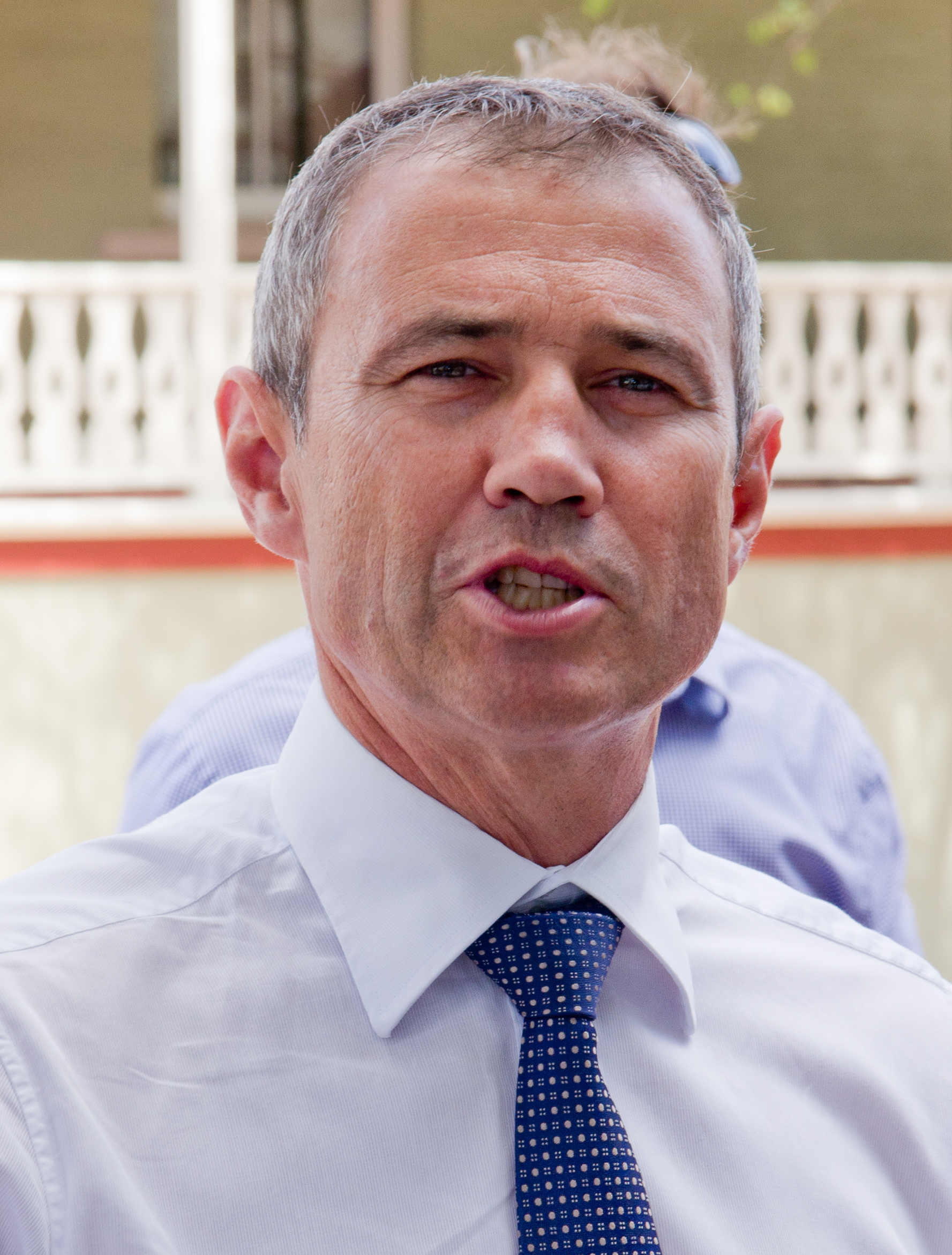
Roger Cook, Premier of Western Australia and Leader of WA Labor

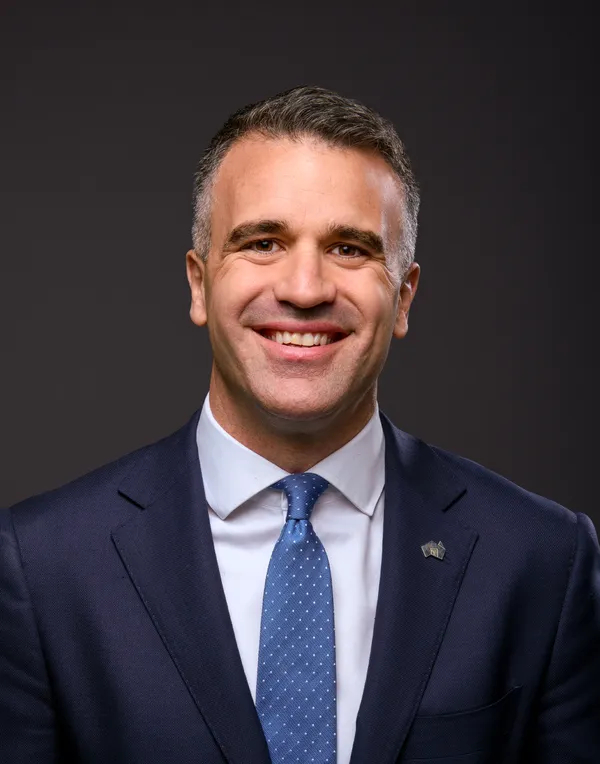
Peter Malinauskas, Premier of South Australia and Leader of SA Labor

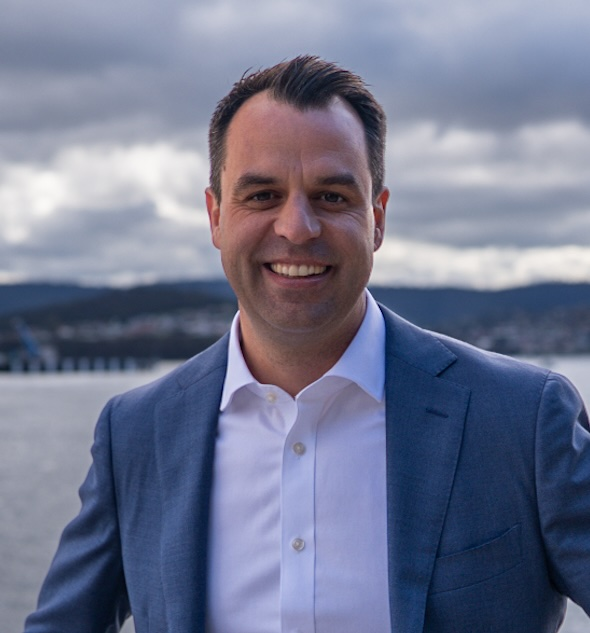
Josh Willie, Leader of the Opposition of Tasmania and Leader of Tasmanian Labor

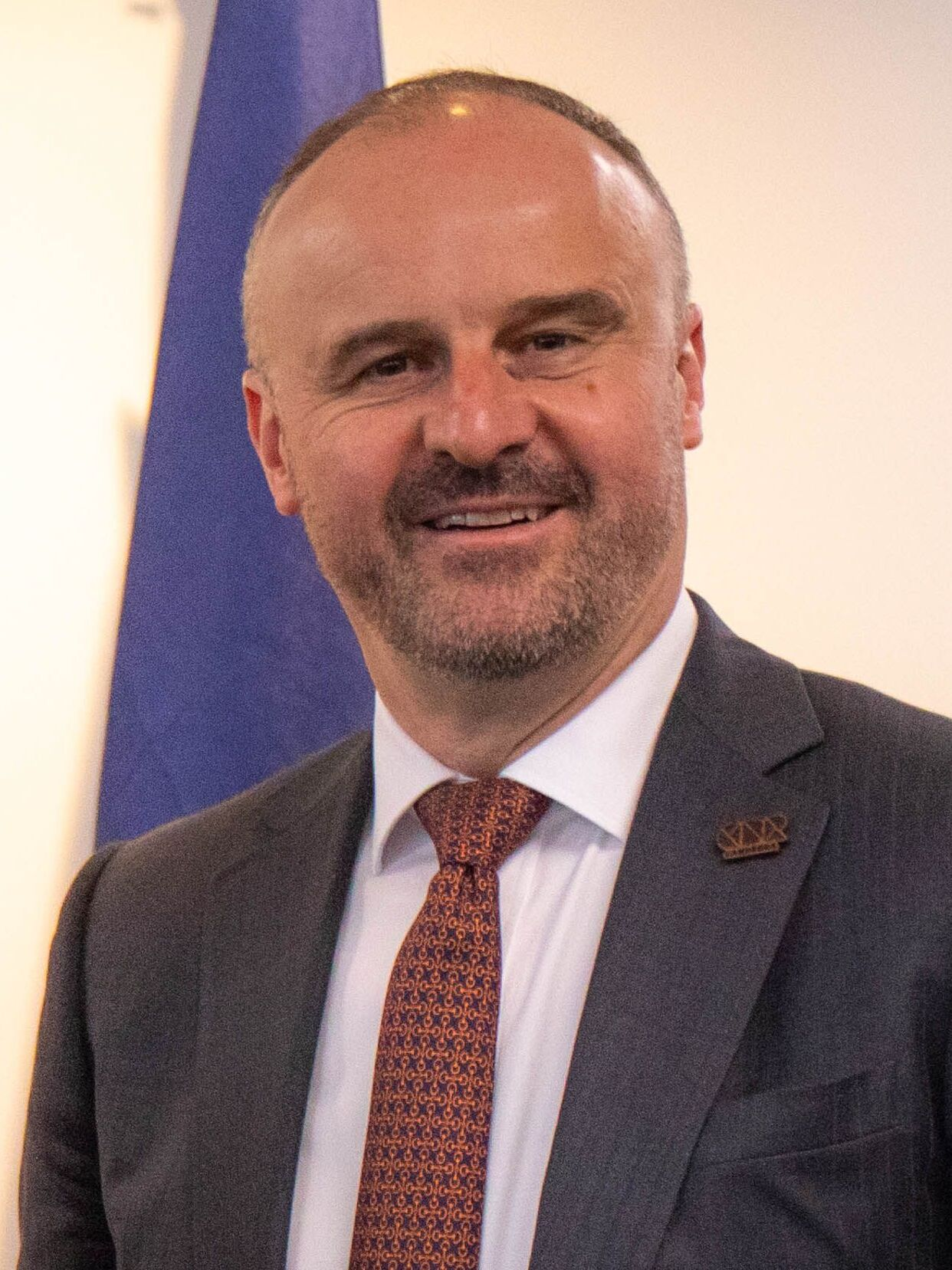
Andrew Barr, Chief Minister of the Australian Capital Territory and Leader of ACT Labor

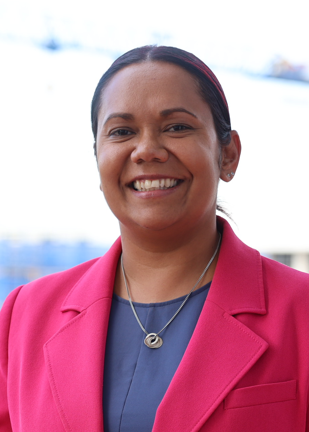
Selena Uibo, Leader of the Opposition in the Northern Territory and Leader of Territory Labor

Members are generally expected to attend at least one meeting of their local branch each year, although there are differences in the rules from state to state. In practice, only a dedicated minority regularly attend meetings. Many members are only active during election campaigns.

The members and unions elect delegates to state and territory conferences (usually held annually, although more frequent conferences are often held). These conferences decide policy, and elect state or territory executives, a state or territory president (an honorary position usually held for a one-year term), and a state or territory secretary (a full-time professional position). However, ACT Labor directly elects its president. The larger branches also have full-time assistant secretaries and organisers. In the past the ratio of conference delegates coming from the branches and affiliated unions has varied from state to state, however under recent national reforms at least 50% of delegates at all state and territory conferences must be elected by branches.

In some states, the party also contests local government elections or endorses local candidates. In others it does not, preferring to allow its members to run as non-endorsed candidates. The process of choosing candidates is called preselection. Candidates are preselected by different methods in the various states and territories. In some they are chosen by ballots of all party members, in others by panels or committees elected by the state conference, in still others by a combination of these two.

The state and territory Labor branches are the following:

Branch	Leader	Year	Last state/territory election						Federal representatives	
Branch	Leader	Year	Lower house			Upper house		Status	MPs	Senators
Branch	Leader	Year	Votes (%)	Seats	TPP (%)	Votes (%)	Seats	Status	MPs	Senators
New South Wales Labor	Chris Minns (since 2021)	2023	37.1	46 / 93	54.3	37.1	15 / 42	Minority	28 / 46	4 / 12
Victorian Labor	Ben Carroll (since 2026)	2022	36.7	56 / 88	55.0	33.0	15 / 40	Majority	27 / 38	5 / 12
Queensland Labor	Steven Miles (since 2023)	2024	32.6	36 / 93	46.2	—N/a (Note: Queensland has maintained a unicameral legislature since 1922.)		Opposition	12 / 30	4 / 12
Western Australian Labor	Roger Cook (since 2023)	2025	41.4	46 / 59	57.1	40.9	16 / 36	Majority	11 / 16	5 / 12
South Australian Labor	Peter Malinauskas (since 2018)	2026	37.47	34 / 47	55.66	37.47	10 / 22	Majority	7 / 10	5 / 12
Tasmanian Labor	Josh Willie (since 2025)	2025	25.87	10 / 35	—N/a (Note: Tasmania uses a semi-proportional system and thus TPP is not calculated.)	—N/a (Note: Tasmania elects legislative council representatives on a periodic basis, with elections held almost every year.)	3 / 15	Opposition	4 / 5	4 / 12
ACT Labor	Andrew Barr	2024	34.5	10 / 25	—N/a (Note: The ACT uses a semi-proportional system and thus TPP is not calculated.)	—N/a (Note: The ACT has a unicameral parliament.)		Minority	3 / 3	1 / 2
Territory Labor	Selena Uibo (since 2024)	2024	28.7	4 / 25	42.0	—N/a (Note: The Northern Territory has a unicameral parliament.)		Opposition	2 / 2	1 / 2

== Ideology and factions ==
Labor's constitution has long stated: "The Australian Labor Party is a democratic socialist party and has the objective of the democratic socialisation of industry, production, distribution and exchange, to the extent necessary to eliminate exploitation and other anti-social features in these fields". This "socialist objective" was introduced in 1921, but was later qualified by two further objectives: "maintenance of and support for a competitive non-monopolistic private sector" and "the right to own private property". Labor governments have not attempted the "democratic socialisation" of any industry since the 1940s, when the Chifley government failed to nationalise the private banks, and in fact have privatised several industries such as aviation and banking.

Prior to the introduction of the socialist objective in 1921, Labor had already identified itself with socialism. During a Federal Conference in 1905, it was resolved ‘that the Australian Labor Movement be brought into organised relationship with the international movement, and, with that object in view, steps be taken to secure Australia’s direct representation at the next International Conference of the Socialist-‘Second’-International.’ In May that year, the then Labor leader Chris Watson declared Labor’s idea of socialism being to give everyone an equal opportunity, and two months later described the socialism of the Labor Party as such:

We look forward to an ideal, when collectivism will take the place of competition in this world, when production will be for use-not profit.

During a speech in April 1906, Watson stated (as noted by one observer at the time) that Labor “saw no objection to socialistic methods being adopted for the benefit of producers” but desired “to see those methods extended to other individuals in the community, whether farmers or labourers.” During another speech earlier that month, Watson declared that Labor “is socialistic, and more-it had deliberately adopted a socialistic programme.” In a later speech from 1910, Watson stated that socialism was the objective of both the Federal and State Labor parties.

In 1916, a British labour publication said of the Australian Labor Party that “while eschewing theoretical doctrines, the programme of the Labour party is in reality socialism sans phrase.

Labor’s socialism has traditionally been of the pragmatic kind, as characterised by what has been described as “the oft-quoted dictum” of Andrew Fisher’s:

No (Labour) Party worthy of the name can deny that its objective is socialism, but no socialist with any parliamentary experience can hope to get anything for many years to come-other than practical legislation of a socialist nature.

=== Factions ===
Parliamentary caucus seats by faction
- Labor Left: 61 / 124
- Labor Right: 61 / 124
- Unaligned: 2 / 124

The Labor Party has always had a left wing and a right wing; however, since 1989, it has been organised into formal factions.

The two largest factional groupings are the Labor Left, who are supportive of democratic socialist ideals, and the Labor Right who generally support social democratic traditions. The national factional groupings are themselves divided into formal factions, primarily state-based such as Centre Unity in New South Wales and Labor Forum in Queensland.

Some trade unions are affiliated with the Labor Party and are also factionally aligned. Important unions supporting the right faction are the Australian Workers' Union (AWU), the Shop, Distributive and Allied Employees Association (SDA) and the Transport Workers' Union of Australia (TWU). Important unions supporting the left include the Australian Manufacturing Workers Union (AMWU), United Workers Union (UWU), the Construction, Forestry and Maritime Employees Union (CFMEU) and the Community and Public Sector Union (CPSU).

== Policies ==
=== National platform ===
The values statements and policy details of the Australian Labor Party are contained in its National Platform, a detailed document which is approved by delegates to Labor's National Conference, held every three years. According to the Labor Party's website, "The Platform is the result of a rigorous and constructive process of consultation, spanning the nation and including the cooperation and input of state and territory policy committees, local branches, unions, state and territory governments, and individual Party members. The Platform provides the policy foundation from which we can continue to work towards the election of a federal Labor government."

Australian Labor Party National Platforms
Conference	Year	Platform Title	Ref
49th	2023	Australian Labor Party National Platform	
Special	2021	ALP National Platform	
48th	2018	A Fair Go For Australia	
47th	2015	A smart, modern, fair Australia	
46th	2011	Australian Labor National Platform	
45th	2009	Australian Labor Party National Platform	
44th	2007	National Platform and Constitution 2007	
43rd	2004	Australian Labor Party National Platform 2004	
42nd	2000	Australian Labor Party: 2000 Platform and Constitution	
41st	1998	Constitution and 1998 ALP Platform	
40th	1994	Australian Labor Party platform, resolutions and rules	
39th	1991	Australian Labor Party 1991 Platform	
Special	1990	Australian Labor Party Special National Conference	
38th	1988	Australian Labor Party Platform, Resolutions and Rules	
37th	1986	Australian Labor Party Platform, Resolutions and Rules	
36th	1984	Australian Labor Party Platform, Constitution and Rules	
35th	1982	Australian Labor Party Platform, Constitution and Rules	
34th	1981	Australian Labor Party Decisions of 1981 National Conference	
33rd	1979	Australian Labor Party Platform, Constitution and Rules	
32nd	1977	Australian Labor Party Platform, Constitution and Rules	
31st	1975	Australian Labor Party Platform, Constitution and Rules	
30th	1973	Australian Labor Party Platform, Constitution and Rules	
29th	1971	Australian Labor Party Platform, Constitution and Rules	
28th	1969	Australian Labor Party Platform, Constitution and Rules	
27th	1967	Australian Labor Party Platform, Constitution and Rules	
Special	1966	Special Commonwealth Conference, July 1966: report, findings and documents	
Special	1966	Special Commonwealth Conference, March 1966: report, findings and documents	
26th	1965	Australian Labor Party Federal Platform, Constitution and Rules	
Special	1963	Special Commonwealth Conference on Foreign Affairs and Defence	
25th	1963	Australian Labor Party Federal Platform, Constitution and Rules	
24th	1961	Australian Labor Party Federal Platform, Constitution and Rules	
23rd	1959	Federal Platform and Objective	
22nd	1957	Federal Platform and Objective	
21st	1955	Federal Platform and Objective	
20th	1953	Federal Platform and Objective	
19th	1951	Federal Platform and Objective	
18th	1948	Federal Platform and Objective	
17th	1945	Federal Platform and Objective	
16th	1943	Federal Platform and Objective	
Special	1942–1943	Federal Platform and Objective	
15th	1939	Platform and Objective	
14th	1936	Platform and Objective	
13th	1933	Platform and Objective	
Special	August 1931	Special Federal Conference Melbourne, 1931	
Special	March 1931	Special Federal Conference Sydney, 1931	
12th	1930	Platform and Objective	
11th	1927	Platform and Constitution	
10th	1924	Platform and Constitution	
9th	1921	Platform and Constitution	
Special	October 1919	Official Report of the Special Commonwealth Conference	
8th	June 1919	Fighting and General Platform	
7th	1918	Fighting and General Platform	
Special	1916	Report of Proceedings of the Special Commonwealth Conference	
6th	1915	Official Report of the Sixth Commonwealth Conference	
5th	1912	Fifth Conference of the Australian Labor Party	
4th	1908	Fourth Commonwealth Political Labour Conference	
3rd	1905	Third Commonwealth Political Labour Conference	
2nd	1902	Commonwealth Labour Conference	
1st	1900	Federal Labour Party Platform	

=== Policy Action Caucuses ===
The Australian Labor Party includes a variety of networks and associations that connect members, advocate for issues, and contribute to the party's policy development. The national platform currently mandates or encourages state branches to formally establish these groups along with calling for generalised interest groups known as Policy Action Caucuses (PACs).

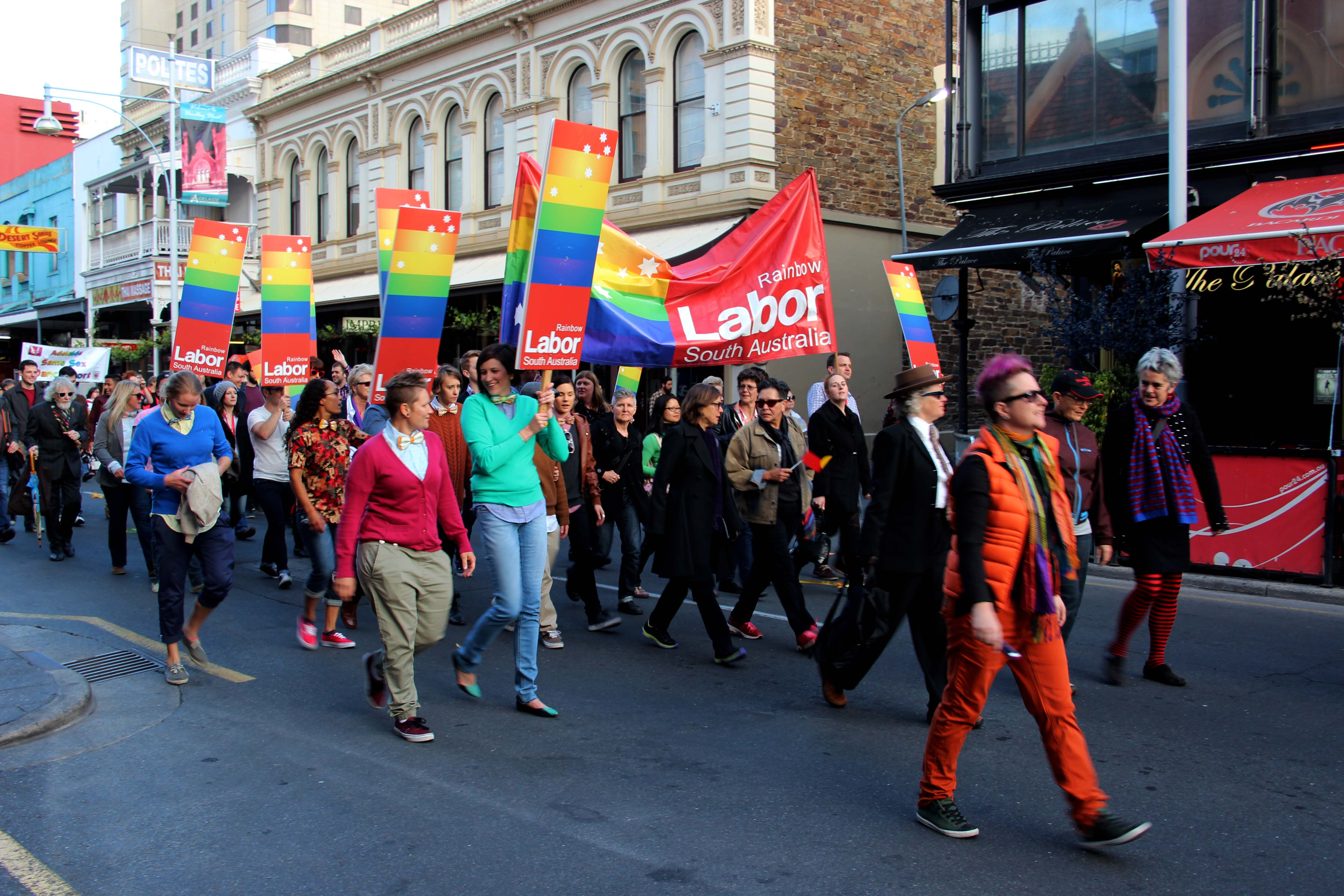
Rainbow Labor members at Pride March, Adelaide 9 November 2013

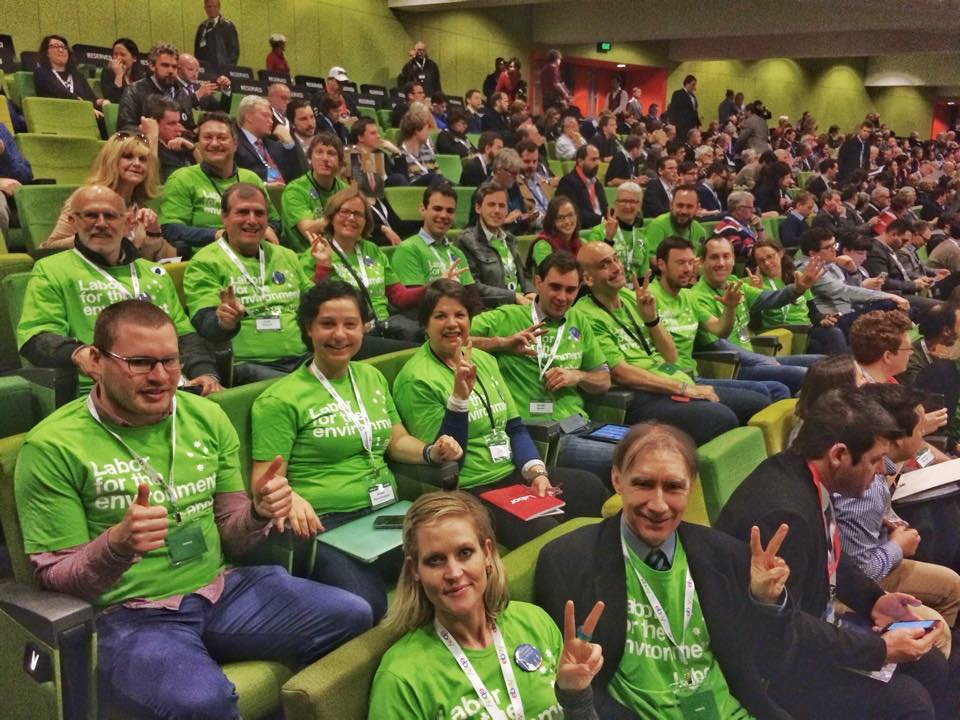
Labor Environment Action Network members at National Conference

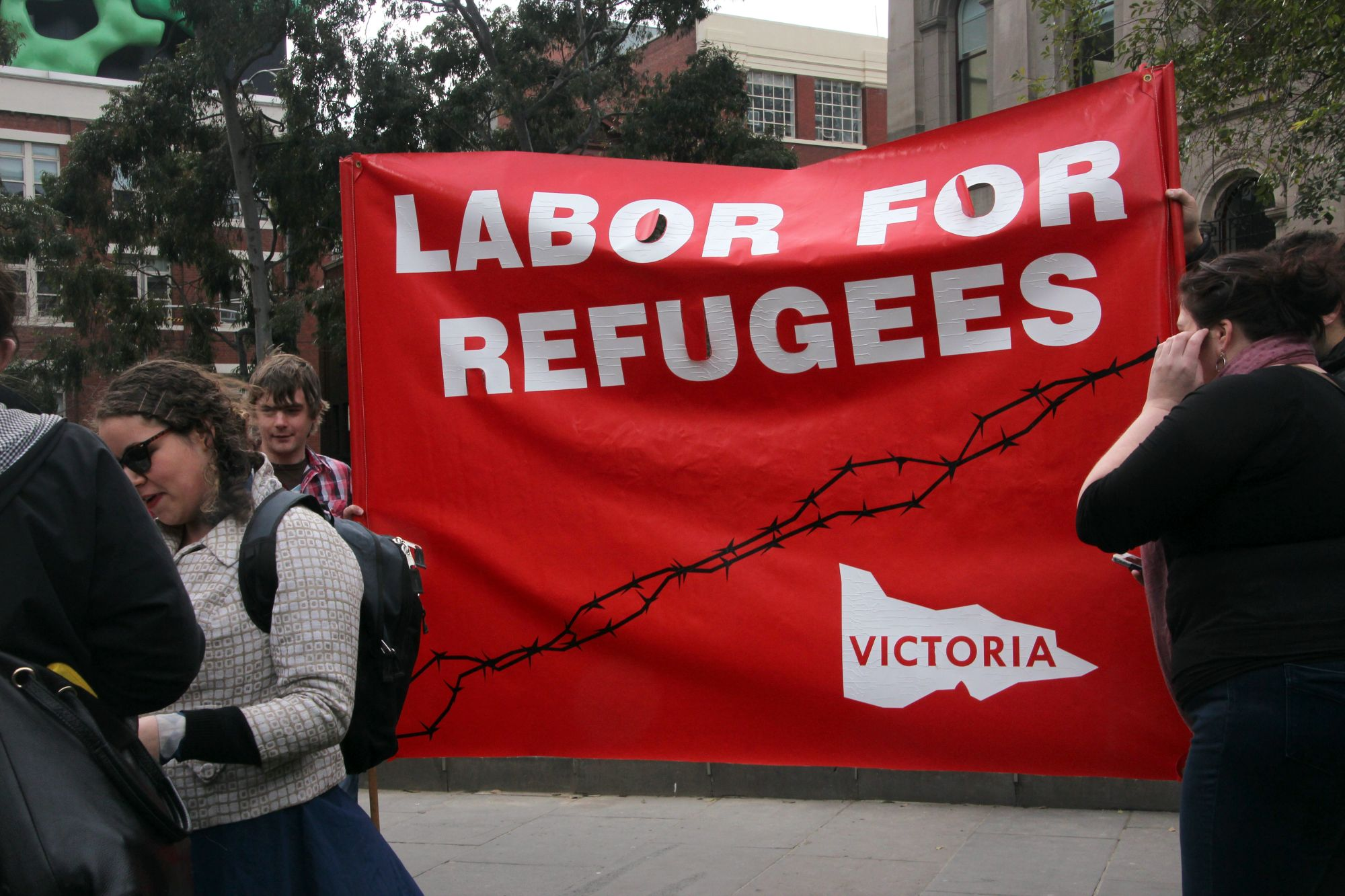
Victorian Labor for Refugees members at a public protest, 2013

These groups operate under different names across states and territories and are categorized into equity groups, which focus on representation based on identity or shared characteristics, and policy-focused groups, which emphasize thematic advocacy. In Queensland, these networks are formally referred to as Equity Groups and Associations, which are distinct entities. Other states use terms such as forums, caucuses, or committees.

Policy Action Caucuses
Organisation	Type	Description	Affiliated branches	Ref.
Rainbow Labor	Equity Group	"Rainbow Labor is the grassroots organisation for Lesbian, Gay, Bisexual, Transgender and Intersex (LGBTI) Labor members and supporters."	Federal, NSW, Vic, Qld, WA, SA, Tas, ACT	
Indigenous Labor Network (Note: In New South Wales and Western Australia known as the First Nations Network.)	Equity Group	"The Indigenous Labor Network advocates for First Nations rights, reconciliation, and culturally informed policies within the party's framework. It amplifies Aboriginal and Torres Strait Islander voices in decision-making, influencing platforms on land rights and closing the gap initiatives."	Federal, NSW, Vic, Qld, WA, SA, Tas, ACT, NT	
Labor Enabled	Equity Group	"Labor Enabled is an official, member-led advocacy group within the Australian Labor Party focused on empowering people with disabilities or lived experience with disability. It works to increase political participation, ensure inclusive policy and provide a supportive network within the party."	Vic, Qld, Tas	
Young Labor	Equity Group	"Australian Young Labor is the youth wing of the party, aimed at promoting social democracy, social justice, and progressive policies for members aged 15-26. Its mission focuses on campaigning for Labor governments, advocating for issues important to young people while amplifying youth voices within the party."	Federal, NSW, Vic, Qld, WA, SA, Tas, ACT, NT	
Multicultural Labor (Note: In New South Wales known as Labor Action for Multiculturalism Policy (LAMP), in Tasmania as the Migrant & Multicultural Policy Action Caucus and in Western Australia as the Multicultural Labor Organisation (MLO))	Equity Group	"Multicultural Labor is the official network for Labor members from multicultural communities, and advocates on issues that affect multicultural Australians."	Vic, Qld, WA	
Labor Women's Network	Equity Group	"The Labor Women's Networks promote activism within the ALP at federal and state levels, encourage women to participate in processes of government and public life, and aim to achieve sound policy outcomes that support women in Australia."	Federal, NSW, Vic, Qld, WA, SA, Tas, ACT, NT	
Country Labor (Note: In Tasmania known as Labor for Regional Tasmania)	Association	"Country Labor forms the voice of regional Australia and strives to ensure that the voice of rural and regional areas remain strong within Labor."	NSW, Vic, WA, Tas	
Labor Environment Action Network	Association	"LEAN works with affiliated unions, MPs and other stakeholders from all corners of the party to advocate for good environmental outcomes which reflect Labor's values of social justice, decent work and strong communities."	Federal, NSW, Vic, Qld, WA, SA, Tas, ACT, NT	
Labor for Choice	Association	"Labor for Choice is a pro-choice action network working within the Australian Labor Party to advance legal, safe, accessible and affordable abortion in Australia. It focuses on removing conscience votes on reproductive rights to ensure binding support for abortion access within the party, aiming to reduce inequalities in healthcare access."	NSW, Vic, Qld, WA, SA, Tas, ACT	
Labor for Refugees	Association	"Labor for Refugees is a cross-factional movement made up of party members and trade unionists who have committed themselves to seek a just and fair Labor Party policy on refugees and people seeking asylum. Labor for Refugees has been instrumental in the improvements to the ALP National Platform at ALP National Conferences."	NSW, Vic, Qld, WA, SA, Tas, ACT	
Labor for Gambling Reform	Association	"Labor for Gambling Reform calls for the implementation of the 'You Win Some, You Lose More' report recommendations in full, specifically Recommendation 26, a comprehensive ban on all forms of advertising for online gambling."	Federal, NSW	
Labor Friends of Palestine	Association	"Labor Friends of Palestine's aim is to raise awareness and take actions along with advocacy groups world wide in working to help bring about freedom, justice and equality for the Palestinian people."	NSW, Vic, Qld, WA, SA, Tas, ACT	
Labor Against War	Association	"Labor Against War is a grassroots network of ALP members opposed to AUKUS and Australia being dragged into another US-led war."	Federal	
Labor Teachers (Note: In New South Wales known as the NSW Labor Teachers network)	Association	"Labor Teachers is a rank-and-file organisation consisting of both public and independent school teachers active in our party's branches. Teachers have established this group to ensure that the party listens to teachers, supports the hard work of education unions and implements progressive education policy."	NSW, Qld	

== Election results ==
=== House of Representatives ===
Election	Leader	Votes	%	Seats	±	Position	Status
1901	None	79,736	15.8	14 / 75	▲14	▲3rd	External support
1903	Chris Watson	223,163	31.0	22 / 75	▲7	3rd	Support (1903–04)
1903	Chris Watson	223,163	31.0	22 / 75	▲7	3rd	Minority (1904)
1903	Chris Watson	223,163	31.0	22 / 75	▲7	3rd	Opposition (1904–05)
1903	Chris Watson	223,163	31.0	22 / 75	▲7	3rd	Support (1905–06)
1906	Chris Watson	348,711	36.6	26 / 75	▲4	▲1st	Support (1906–08)
1906	Chris Watson	348,711	36.6	26 / 75	▲4	▲1st	Minority (1908–09)
1906	Chris Watson	348,711	36.6	26 / 75	▲4	▲1st	Opposition (1909–10)
1910	Andrew Fisher	660,864	50.0	42 / 75	▲16	1st	Majority
1913	Andrew Fisher	921,099	48.5	37 / 75	▼5	▼2nd	Opposition
1914	Andrew Fisher	858,451	50.9	42 / 75	▲5	▲1st	Majority
1917	Frank Tudor	827,541	43.9	22 / 75	▼20	▼2nd	Opposition
1919	Frank Tudor	811,244	42.5	26 / 75	▲4	2nd	Opposition
1922	Matthew Charlton	665,145	42.3	29 / 75	▲3	▲1st	Opposition
1925	Matthew Charlton	1,313,627	45.0	23 / 75	▼6	▼2nd	Opposition
1928	James Scullin	1,158,505	44.6	31 / 75	▲8	▲1st	Opposition
1929	James Scullin	1,406,327	48.8	46 / 75	▲15	1st	Majority
1931	James Scullin	859,513	27.1	14 / 75	▼32	▼3rd	Opposition
1934	James Scullin	952,251	26.8	18 / 74	▲4	▲2nd	Opposition
1937	John Curtin	1,555,737	43.2	29 / 74	▲11	▲1st	Opposition
1940	John Curtin	1,556,941	40.2	32 / 74	▲3	1st	Opposition (1940–41)
1940	John Curtin	1,556,941	40.2	32 / 74	▲3	1st	Minority (1941–43)
1943	John Curtin	2,058,578	49.9	49 / 74	▲17	1st	Majority
1946	Ben Chifley	2,159,953	49.7	43 / 75	▼6	1st	Majority
1949	Ben Chifley	2,117,088	46.0	47 / 121	▲4	▼2nd	Opposition
1951	Ben Chifley	2,174,840	47.6	52 / 121	▲5	▲1st	Opposition
1954	H. V. Evatt	2,280,098	50.0	57 / 121	▲5	1st	Opposition
1955	H. V. Evatt	1,961,829	44.6	47 / 122	▼10	▼2nd	Opposition
1958	H. V. Evatt	2,137,890	42.8	45 / 122	▼2	2nd	Opposition
1961	Arthur Calwell	2,512,929	47.9	60 / 122	▲15	▲1st	Opposition
1963	Arthur Calwell	2,489,184	45.5	50 / 122	▼10	▼2nd	Opposition
1966	Arthur Calwell	2,282,834	40.0	41 / 124	▼9	2nd	Opposition
1969	Gough Whitlam	2,870,792	47.0	59 / 125	▲18	▲1st	Opposition
1972	Gough Whitlam	3,273,549	49.6	67 / 125	▲8	1st	Majority
1974	Gough Whitlam	3,644,110	49.3	66 / 127	▼1	1st	Majority (1974–75) (Note: The Whitlam-led party became the Opposition after the Governor-General, John Kerr, dismissed it during the 1975 constitutional crisis, despite Labor maintaining a majority in the House of Representatives.)
1974	Gough Whitlam	3,644,110	49.3	66 / 127	▼1	1st	Opposition (1975)
1975	Gough Whitlam	3,313,004	42.8	36 / 127	▼30	▼2nd	Opposition
1977	Gough Whitlam	3,141,051	39.7	38 / 124	▲2	2nd	Opposition
1980	Bill Hayden	3,749,565	45.2	51 / 125	▲13	2nd	Opposition
1983	Bob Hawke	4,297,392	49.5	75 / 125	▲24	▲1st	Majority
1984	Bob Hawke	4,120,130	47.6	82 / 148	▲7	1st	Majority
1987	Bob Hawke	4,222,431	45.8	86 / 148	▲4	1st	Majority
1990	Bob Hawke	3,904,138	39.4	78 / 148	▼8	1st	Majority
1993	Paul Keating	4,751,390	44.9	80 / 147	▲2	1st	Majority
1996	Paul Keating	4,217,765	38.7	49 / 148	▼31	▼2nd	Opposition
1998	Kim Beazley	4,454,306	40.1	67 / 148	▲18	▲1st	Opposition
2001	Kim Beazley	4,341,420	37.8	65 / 150	▼2	▼2nd	Opposition
2004	Mark Latham	4,408,820	37.6	60 / 150	▼5	2nd	Opposition
2007	Kevin Rudd	5,388,184	43.4	83 / 150	▲23	▲1st	Majority
2010	Julia Gillard	4,711,363	38.0	72 / 150	▼11	1st	Minority
2013	Kevin Rudd	4,311,365	33.4	55 / 150	▼17	▼2nd	Opposition
2016	Bill Shorten	4,702,296	34.7	69 / 150	▲14	▼2nd	Opposition
2019	Bill Shorten	4,752,110	33.3	68 / 151	▼1	▼2nd	Opposition
2022	Anthony Albanese	4,776,030	32.6	77 / 151	▲9	▲1st	Majority
2025	Anthony Albanese	5,354,138	34.6	94 / 150	▲17	1st	Majority

=== Results timeline ===
Year	(Australia) AU	(Australian Capital Territory) ACT	(New South Wales) NSW	(Northern Territory) NT	(Queensland) Qld	(South Australia) SA	(Tasmania) Tas	(Victoria (state)) Vic	(Western Australia) WA
1891	N/A	N/A	35/141	N/A	N/A	N/A	N/A	N/A	N/A
1892	N/A	N/A	35/141	N/A	N/A	N/A	N/A	19.7	N/A
1893	N/A	N/A	35/141	N/A	16/72	10/54	N/A	19.7	N/A
1894	N/A	N/A	▼15/125	N/A	16/72	10/54	N/A	▲19.8	N/A
1895	N/A	N/A	▲18/125	N/A	16/72	10/54	N/A	▲19.8	N/A
1896	N/A	N/A	▲18/125	N/A	▲20/72	▲12/54	N/A	▲19.8	N/A
1897	N/A	N/A	▲18/125	N/A	▲20/72	▲12/54	N/A	▼10.4	4.4
1898	N/A	N/A	▲19/125	N/A	▲20/72	▲12/54	N/A	▼10.4	4.4
1899	N/A	N/A	▲19/125	N/A	▲21/72	▼11/54	N/A	▼10.4	4.4
1900	N/A	N/A	▲19/125	N/A	▲21/72	▼11/54	N/A	▲11.2	4.4
1901	14/75	N/A	▲24/125	N/A	▲21/72	▼11/54	N/A	▲11.2	▲25.8
1902	14/75	N/A	▲24/125	N/A	▲25/72	▼5/42	N/A	▲18.0	▲25.8
1903	▲22/75	N/A	▲24/125	N/A	▲25/72	▼5/42	10.6	▲18.0	▲25.8
1904	▲22/75	N/A	▲25/90	N/A	▲34/72	▼5/42	10.6	▲32.5	▲42.6
1905	▲22/75	N/A	▲25/90	N/A	▲34/72	▲15/42	10.6	▲32.5	▲35.1
1906	▲26/75	N/A	▲25/90	N/A	▲34/72	▲20/42	▲26.5	▲32.5	▲35.1
1907	▲26/75	N/A	▲32/90	N/A	▼18/72		▲26.5	▲34.4	▲35.1
1908	▲26/75	N/A	▲32/90	N/A	▲22/72		▲26.5	▲34.8	▲37.8
1909	▲26/75	N/A	▲32/90	N/A	▲27/72		▲38.9	▲34.8	▲37.8
1910	▲42/75	N/A	▲46/90	N/A	▲27/72	▲22/42		▲34.8	▲37.8
1911		N/A		N/A	▲27/72			▲43.1	▲52.6
1912		N/A		N/A	▼25/72	▼16/40	▲45.5	▲43.1	
1913	▼37/75	N/A	▲49/90	N/A	▼25/72	▼16/40	▲46.0	▲43.1	
1914	▲42/75	N/A		N/A	▼25/72	▼16/40		▼39.6	▲42.1
1915		N/A		N/A	▲45/72	▲26/46		▼39.6	
1916		N/A		N/A			▲48.5	▼39.6	
1917	▼22/75	N/A	▼33/90	N/A			▲48.5	▼32.3	▼24.8
1918	▼22/75	N/A	▼33/90	N/A	▲48/72	▼17/46	▲48.5	▼32.3	▼24.8
1919	▲26/75	N/A	▼33/90	N/A		▼17/46	▼41.4	▼32.3	▼24.8
1920	▲26/75	N/A	▲43/90	N/A	▼38/72	▼17/46	▼41.4	▼29.3	▼24.8
1921	▲26/75	N/A		N/A		▼16/46	▼41.4	▲35.7	▲36.8
1922	▲29/75	N/A	▼36/90	N/A		▼16/46	▼36.7	▲35.7	▲36.8
1923	▲29/75	N/A	▼36/90	N/A	▲43/72	▼16/46		▲35.7	▲36.8
1924	▲29/75	N/A	▼36/90	N/A		▲27/46		▼34.9	▲40.4
1925	▼23/75	N/A	▲46/90	N/A			▲48.5		
1926	▼23/75	N/A		N/A	43/72				
1927	▼23/75	N/A	▼40/90	N/A		▼16/46		▲41.8	▲45.3
1928	▲31/75	N/A	▼40/90	N/A		▼16/46	▼47.2		
1929	▲46/75	N/A	▼40/90	N/A	▼27/72	▼16/46	▼47.2	▼39.1	
1930		N/A	▲55/90	N/A	▼27/72	▲**30/46**	▼47.2		▼38.4
1931	▼14/75	N/A		N/A	▼27/72		▼34.9		▼38.4
1932	▼14/75	N/A	▼24/90	N/A	▲33/62		▼34.9	▼35.1	▼38.4
1933	▼14/75	N/A	▼24/90	N/A		▼6/46	▼34.9	▼35.1	▲45.5
1934	▲18/74	N/A	▼24/90	N/A		▼6/46	▲45.8	▼35.1	
1935	▲18/74	N/A	▲29/90	N/A	▲**46/62**	▼6/46		▲37.9	
1936	▲18/74	N/A	▲29/90	N/A		▼6/46		▲37.9	▼42.3
1937	▲29/74	N/A	▲29/90	N/A		▼6/46	▲58.7	▲41.0	
1938	▲29/74	N/A	▼24/90	N/A	▼44/62	▲9/39		▲41.0	
1939	▲29/74	N/A	▼24/90	N/A		▲9/39		▲41.0	▲45.0
1940	▲32/74	N/A	▼24/90	N/A		▲9/39		▼33.2	
1941		N/A	▲54/90	N/A	▼41/62	▲11/39	▲**62.6**	▼33.2	
1942		N/A		N/A		▲11/39		▼33.2	
1943	▲49/74	N/A		N/A		▲11/39		▲36.1	▼43.3
1944		N/A	▲56/90	N/A	▼37/62	▲16/39		▲36.1	
1945		N/A		N/A		▲16/39		▲45.1	
1946	▼43/75	N/A		N/A		▲16/39	▲50.1		
1947		N/A	▼52/90	N/A	▼35/62	▼13/39		▼40.9	▼39.4
1948		N/A		N/A		▼13/39	▼49.4	▼40.9	▼39.4
1949	▲47/121	N/A		N/A		▼13/39		▼40.9	▼39.4
1950	▲47/121	N/A	▼46/94	N/A	▲42/75	▼12/39	▼48.6	▲45.3	▲41.8
1951	▲52/121	N/A		N/A		▼12/39		▲45.3	▲41.8
1952	▲52/121	N/A		N/A		▼12/39		▲49.1	▲41.8
1953	▲52/121	N/A	▲57/94	N/A	▲50/75	▲14/39			▲49.8
1954	▲57/121	N/A		N/A		▲14/39			
1955	▼47/122	N/A		N/A		▲14/39	▲52.6	▼32.6	
1956	▼47/122	N/A	▼50/94	N/A	▼49/75	▲15/39	▼50.3	▼32.6	▼49.7
1957	▼47/122	N/A		N/A	▼20/75	▲15/39		▼32.6	
1958	▼45/122	N/A		N/A	▼20/75	▲15/39		▲37.7	
1959	▼45/122	N/A	▼49/94	N/A	▼20/75	▲17/39	▼44.5	▲37.7	▼44.9
1960	▼45/122	N/A		N/A	▲25/78	▲17/39		▲37.7	▼44.9
1961	▲60/122	N/A		N/A	▲25/78	▲17/39		▲38.5	▼44.9
1962	▲60/122	N/A	▲52/94	N/A	▲25/78	▲19/39		▲38.5	▼44.4
1963	▼50/122	N/A		N/A	▲26/78	▲19/39		▲38.5	▼44.4
1964	▼50/122	N/A		N/A	▲26/78	▲19/39	▲51.3	▼36.2	▼44.4
1965	▼50/122	N/A	▼45/94	N/A	▲26/78	▲21/39		▼36.2	▼42.6
1966	▼41/124	N/A	▼45/94	N/A	26/78			▼36.2	▼42.6
1967	▼41/124	N/A	▼45/94	N/A	26/78			▲37.9	▼42.6
1968	▼41/124	N/A	▼39/94	N/A	26/78	▼19/39		▲37.9	▼45.3
1969	▲59/125	N/A	▼39/94	N/A	▲31/78	▼19/39	▼47.7	▲37.9	▼45.3
1970	▲59/125	N/A	▼39/94	N/A	▲31/78	▲27/47	▼47.7	▲41.4	▼45.3
1971	▲59/125	N/A	▲45/96	N/A	▲31/78		▼47.7	▲41.4	▲48.9
1972	▲67/125	N/A	▲45/96	N/A	▲33/82		▲54.9	▲41.4	
1973		N/A	▼44/99	N/A	▲33/82	▼26/47		▲41.6	
1974	▼66/127	N/A	▼44/99	30.5	▼11/82			▲41.6	▼48.1
1975	▼36/127	N/A	▼44/99	30.5	▼11/82	▼23/47		▲41.6	▼48.1
1976	▼36/127	N/A	▲50/99	30.5	▼11/82		▼52.5	▲42.4	▼48.1
1977	▲38/124	N/A		▲6/19	▲23/82	▲27/47		▲42.4	▼44.2
1978	▲38/124	N/A	▲63/99	▲6/19	▲23/82			▲42.4	▼44.2
1979	▲38/124	N/A		▲6/19	▲23/82	▼20/47	▲54.3	▲45.2	▼44.2
1980	▲51/125	N/A		▲7/19	▲25/82	▼20/47		▲45.2	▲45.9
1981	▲51/125	N/A	▲**66/99**	▲7/19	▲25/82	▼20/47		▲45.2	▲45.9
1982	▲51/125	N/A		▲7/19	▲25/82	▲24/47	▼36.9	▲50.0	▲45.9
1983	▲75/125	N/A		▼6/25	▲32/82		▼36.9		▲53.2
1984	▲82/148	N/A	▼58/99	▼6/25	▲32/82		▼36.9		
1985		N/A		▼6/25	▲32/82	▲27/47	▼36.9	▲50.0	
1986		N/A		▼6/25	▼30/89		▼35.1		▼53.0
1987	▲86/148	N/A		6/25	▼30/89		▼35.1		
1988		N/A	▼43/109	6/25	▼30/89		▼35.1	▼46.5	
1989		5/17	▼43/109	6/25	▲54/89	▼22/47	▼34.7		▼42.5
1990	▼78/148		▼43/109	▲9/25					
1991			▲46/99	▲9/25					
1992		▲8/17	▲46/99	▲9/25	54/89		▼28.9	▼38.4	
1993	▲80/147		▲46/99	▲9/25		▼10/47	▼28.9	▼38.4	▼37.1
1994			▲46/99	▼7/25		▼10/47	▼28.9	▼38.4	▼37.1
1995		▼6/17	▲50/99	▼7/25	▼45/89	▼10/47	▼28.9	▼38.4	▼37.1
1996	▼49/148	▼6/17		▼7/25		▼10/47	▲40.5	▲43.1	▼35.8
1997	▼49/148	▼6/17		7/25		▲21/47	▲40.5	▲43.1	▼35.8
1998	▲67/148	6/17		7/25	▼44/89	▲21/47	▲44.8	▲43.1	▼35.8
1999	▲67/148	6/17	▲55/93	7/25		▲21/47		▲45.6	▼35.8
2000	▲67/148	6/17		7/25		▲21/47			▼35.8
2001	▼65/150	▲8/17		▲13/25	▲**66/89**	▲21/47			▲37.2
2002	▼65/150					▲23/47	▲51.9	▲**47.9**	
2003	▼65/150		55/93						
2004	▼60/150	▲**9/17**			▼63/89				
2005	▼60/150			▲**19/25**					▲41.9
2006	▼60/150				▼59/89	▲28/47	▼49.3	▼43.1	
2007	▲83/150		▼52/93						
2008		▼7/17		▼13/25					▼35.8
2009					▼51/89				▼35.8
2010	▼72/150					▼26/47	▼36.9	▼36.3	▼35.8
2011			▼20/93					▼36.3	▼35.8
2012		▲8/17	▼20/93	▼8/25	▼7/89			▼36.3	▼35.8
2013	▼55/150		▼20/93	▼8/25	▼7/89			▼36.3	▼33.1
2014	▼55/150		▼20/93	▼8/25	▼7/89	▼23/47	▼27.3	▲38.1	▼33.1
2015	▼55/150		▲34/93	▼8/25	▲44/89		▼27.3		▼33.1
2016	▲69/150	▲12/25	▲34/93	▲18/25			▼27.3		▼33.1
2017	▲69/150		▲34/93		▲48/93		▼27.3		▲42.2
2018	▲69/150		▲34/93			▼19/47	▲32.6	▲42.9	
2019	▼68/151		▲36/93			▼19/47	▲32.6		
2020	▼68/151	▼10/25	▲36/93	▼14/25	▲52/93	▼19/47	▲32.6		
2021	▼68/151		▲36/93			▼19/47	▼28.2		▲**59.9**
2022	▲77/151		▲36/93			▲27/47	▼28.2	▼36.7	
2023			▲45/93				▼28.2		
2024		10/25		▼4/25	▼36/93		▲29.0		
2025	▲**94/150**			▼4/25	▼36/93		▼25.9		▼41.4
2026				▼4/25	▼36/93	▲**34/47**	▼25.9	—N/a (Note: The 2026 Victorian state election will be held on 28 November 2026)	
Year	(Australia) AU	(Australian Capital Territory) ACT	(New South Wales) NSW	(Northern Territory) NT	(Queensland) Qld	(South Australia) SA	(Tasmania) Tas	(Victoria (state)) Vic	(Western Australia) WA
**Bold** indicates best result to date. Present in legislature (in opposition); Coalition partner

== Election reviews ==
Australian federal elections
Election	Election result	Review title	Panelists	Ref
2025	Majority government	Beyond the Win: Meeting Australians' Expectations and Delivering Change	Chris Ford; Emeline Gaske; Lenda Oshalem; Moksha Watts	
2022	Majority government	Election 2022: An opportunity to establish a long-term Labor government	Linda White; Craig Emerson; Greg Combet; Lenda Oshalem	
2019	Opposition	Review of Labor's 2019 federal election campaign	Craig Emerson; Jay Weatherill; Linda White; Anthony Chisholm; John Graham; Lenda Oshalem	
2016	Opposition	Review not publicly released	Mark Butler	
2013	Opposition	2013 Election Campaign Review	Jane Garrett; Milton Dick	
2010	Minority government	2010 National Review: Report to the National Executive	Steve Bracks; John Faulkner; Bob Carr	
2007	Majority government	Review not publicly released	John Faulkner	
2004	Opposition	2004 Election Review	Mike Kaiser; Tim Gartrell	
2001	Opposition	National Committee of Review Report August 2002	Bob Hawke; Neville Wran	

== Donors ==
The Labor Party is primarily funded by small individual donations, and from trade unions. In 2023–24, state and federal branches of Labor reported $67.5 million in donations. Labor's largest donation was $1 million from Anthony Pratt. Other large donors were unions and gambling companies. For the 2015–2016 financial year, the top ten disclosed donors to the ALP were the Health Services Union NSW ($389,000), Village Roadshow ($257,000), Electrical Trades Union of Australia ($171,000), National Automotive Leasing and Salary Packaging Association ($153,000), Westfield Corporation ($150,000), Randazzo C&G Developments ($120,000), Macquarie Telecom ($113,000), Woodside Energy ($110,000), ANZ Bank ($100,000) and Ying Zhou ($100,000),

A 2019 report found that the Labor Party received $33,000 from pro-gun groups during the 2011–2018 periods compared to $82,000 received by the Coalition.

Financial year	Total receipts	Large donors (over $100,000)	Party entity donors
2024–2025	$71,858,506 (Note: This total includes $34,887,284 in election funding from the Australian Electoral Commission, $4,218,118 in refunds from the Australian Taxation Office and $1,873,300 in discretionary benefits from the Department of Finance.)	Mining and Energy Union $3,000,000; Pratt Holdings $2,000,000; Westpac Banking Corporation $2,071,490; United Workers Union $1,000,000; Fox Group Holdings $537,500; Plumbing and Pipe Trades Employees Union $500,000; Australian Manufacturing Workers Union $373,881; Australian Capital Equity $312,000; Australian Hotels Association $233,997; The Pharmacy Guild of Australia $224,463; Private Healthcare Australia $194,700; Macquarie Technology Group $153,000; Maurice Blackburn $150,942; Shop, Distributive and Allied Employees Association $150,000; TG Public Affairs $141,098; DoorDash Australia $125,500; Bravus Australia $121,000; National Automotive Leasing and Salary Packaging Association $124,168; Australian Automotive Dealer Association $102,500; Meriton Properties $100,000; Australian Services Union - Together Queensland Branch $100,000	QLD Labor $1,812,776; VIC Labor $1,605,800; NSW Labor $1,057,672; WA Labor $975,126; SA Labor $279,087; ACT Labor $124,823; TAS Labor $54,964; Chifley Research Centre $34,295; NT Labor $9,923
2023–2024	$15,004,625 (Note: Includes payments of $186,421 from the Australian Electoral Commission, $53,237 from the Australian Taxation Office and $1,214,400 from the Department of Finance.)	Pratt Holdings $1,000,000; Australian Hotels Association $202,469; The Pharmacy Guild of Australia $137,700; Private Healthcare Australia $128,400; National Automotive Leasing and Salary Packaging Association $120,000; Navitas Ltd $120,000; Low Emission Technology Australia Ltd $108,700; Spirits and Cocktails Australia $104,700; Fitzpatrick & Co Advisory $101,521	NSW Labor $347,586; VIC Labor $262,351; QLD Labor $191,365; WA Labor $99,012; SA Labor $90,576; TAS Labor $82,430; Chifley Research Centre $29,213; ACT Labor $20,942; NT Labor $8,823; Labor Environment Action Network $3,250
2022–2023	$18,426,876 (Note: Includes payments of $1,654,195 from the Australian Electoral Commission and $1,470,448 from the Department of Finance.)	Pratt Holdings $1,010,000; PwC Australia $198,831; The Pharmacy Guild of Australia $154,000; Private Healthcare Australia $144,700; Australian Hotels Association $141,696; Ernst & Young $128,058; Motor Trades Association of Australia $127,375; Camufarre Investments Pty Ltd $121,000; National Automotive Leasing and Salary Packaging Association $120,000; ASX Limited $120,000; Medicines Australia $112,000; Sportsbet $110,000; Wesfarmers $110,000; Macquarie Group Services $108,652; Santos Ltd $108,000; Visa Australia $100,500	NSW Labor $390,808; VIC Labor 340,280; QLD Labor $214,810; WA Labor $116,795; SA Labor $88,528; Chifley Research Centre $36,653; TAS Labor $32,050; ACT Labor $17,358; NT Labor $2,188
2021–2022	$58,297,794 (Note: Includes payments of $25,567,366 in election funding from the Australian Electoral Commission, $2,748,698 from the Australian Taxation Office and $1,499,644 from the Department of Finance.)	Westpac Banking Corporation $3,585,000; CFMEU $2,224,000; Pratt Holdings $1,882,000; United Workers Union $1,032,942; Shop, Distributive and Allied Employees Association $1,001,100; Electrical Trades Union $1,000,000; Mining and Energy Union $500,000; Australian Manufacturing Workers Union $207,903; Australian Hotels Association $200,600; The Pharmacy Guild of Australia $155,600; Australian Workers Union $149,285; Maurice Blackburn $137,329; Clubs NSW $130,836; National Automotive Leasing and Salary Packaging Association $126,700; ASX Limited $120,000; Macquarie Technology Group $115,200; Camufarre Investments Pty Ltd $110,000; Wesfarmers $110,000; PwC Australia $105,693; Minerals Council of Australia $102,500; Precision Group $100,000	VIC Labor $1,199,885; NSW Labor $614,981; Labor Holdings Pty Ltd $600,000; QLD Labor $414,739; WA Labor $272,365; TAS Labor $95,145; SA Labor $86,837; NT Labor $65,471; Chifley Research Centre $52,994; ACT Labor $35,000

== See also ==
- History of the Australian Labor Party
- Australian labour movement
- List of trade unions in Australia
- Socialism in Australia

== Bibliography ==
- Bramble, Tom, and Rick Kuhn. Labor's Conflict: Big Business, Workers, and the Politics of Class (Cambridge University Press; 2011) 240 pages.
- Calwell, A. A. (1963). Labor's Role in Modern Society. Melbourne, Lansdowne Press.
- Faulkner, John; Macintyre, Stuart (2001). True Believers – The story of the Federal Parliamentary Labor Party. Sydney: Allen & Unwin. ISBN 1-86508-609-6.
- McKinlay, Brian (1981). The ALP: A Short History of the Australian Labor Party. Melbourne: Drummond/Heinemann. ISBN 0-85859-254-1.
- McMullin, Ross (1991). The Light on the Hill: The Australian Labor Party 1891–1991. South Melbourne: Oxford University Press Australia. ISBN 0-19-553451-4.
