= ClubsNSW =

Australian gambling lobby

- Type: Privately held company; lobby group
- Industry: Gambling; hospitality
- Founded: 1920; 106 years ago
- Headquarters: Sydney, Australia
- Area served: New South Wales
- Key people: George Peponis, OAM (Director); Sallianne Faulkner (Chairperson); Rebecca Riant (CEO)
- Website: clubsnsw.com.au

ClubsNSW is an Australian organisation that lobbies for the gambling and hospitality industries. It is the peak organisation for gambling and hospitality venues in the state of New South Wales, and represents over 1,000 registered clubs statewide. It is a subsidiary of the nationwide peak body Clubs Australia.

Described as one of the most powerful lobbying organisations in Australia, it has exerted considerable influence within New South Wales, and has been embroiled in several controversies. Most notably, it was involved in a lengthy legal battle with whistleblower and former employee Troy Stolz, after Stolz leaked confidential documents revealing that ClubsNSW was not complying with anti-money laundering laws.

== History ==
According to the company's website, ClubsNSW was established in 1920. Gambling machines were legalised in New South Wales in 1956, and the organisation would grow into becoming the peak body for the gambling industry in the state by the mid-2010s. Between July 1999 and June 2015, ClubsNSW made over $2 million in political donations to the Australian Labor Party and the Liberal-National Coalition, as well directly to politicians, in an effort to lobby for gambling industry interests. The organisation has used its status to influence political events, notably when it spent an estimated $3.5 million to successfully campaign against gambling reforms proposed by federal MP Andrew Wilkie, leading to the Labor government of Julia Gillard rescinding its commitment to implement them. According to The Sydney Morning Herald in May 2013, ClubsNSW executives attended a lobbying course in Washington DC, including seminars from members of the National Rifle Association of America (NRA) in an effort to learn "how to use a large membership base to force political outcomes".

In 2024, sixteen venues represented by ClubsNSW were impacted by a data breach that exposed the private information of up to one million patrons.

== Controversies ==
=== Troy Stolz and Friendlyjordies ===
Troy Stolz worked for ClubsNSW as a compliance officer, but resigned from the company in September 2019 after he leaked an internal document to MP Andrew Wilkie showing that only 5 to 10 percent of venues represented by ClubsNSW were in compliance with anti-money laundering laws; Stolz alleged that money laundering in New South Wales gambling venues was rife. Stolz took ClubsNSW to court in March 2020, alleging that he was bullied and blacklisted from the industry by senior staff, and sought $2 million in damages. He was counter-sued by the company in April 2020 for leaking confidential information.

In July 2022, YouTube personality Jordan Shanks, better known as Friendlyjordies, published a video titled The Legal Way to Take a Life, which featured an interview with Stolz. In response, ClubsNSW began a highly unusual private prosecution against both Shanks and Stolz, alleging that the video interview constituted contempt of court on both their parts, making Shanks and Stolz face criminal conviction and potential prison sentences. ClubsNSW also sought and obtained an interim suppression order, something normally only seen in high-level criminal cases. Following this, the video interview was taken down but has since been reuploaded. Following a protracted legal battle, ClubsNSW dropped all legal action against the two in February 2023.

=== Dominic Perrottet "catholic gut" controversy ===
In January 2023 ClubsNSW CEO Josh Landis was fired after stating that New South Wales premier Dominic Perrottet was seeking to introduce cashless gambling card reforms to NSW gambling venues because of his "Catholic gut".

== See also ==
- Australian Hotels Association
- Political lobbying
