= Attorney General Downer =

Attorney General Downer may refer to:

- Henry Edward Downer (1836–1905), Attorney-General of South Australia
- John Downer (1843–1915), Attorney-General of South Australia
