= Department for Education (South Australia) =

South Australian government department

Department overview
- Preceding department: Department for Education and Child Development
- Jurisdiction: Government of South Australia
- Headquarters: 31 Flinders Street, Adelaide
- Employees: 32,073 (2023)
- Annual budget: $4.7 billion (2023-2024)
- Minister responsible: Blair Boyer, Minister for Education, Training and Skills
- Department executives: Prof. Martin Westwell, Chief Executive
- Website: www.education.sa.gov.au

The Department for Education of South Australia is a state government department delivering school education throughout the state. Education in Australia at school level is managed by each state, though the Commonwealth government makes a significant contribution. The department was established through the Education Act of 1875 which allowed for the establishment of public schools and contained provisions for compulsory schooling of children aged between 7 and 13. As the state grew quickly into the 20th Century the Education Department expanded across the very large rural areas of the state. After World War II, rising birth rates, large scale immigration and increasing demand for secondary education led to very rapid growth in the department. The number of private schools grew in this period and with increasing State aid provided growing competition for the State education sector. In the post-war period several of large reviews of education have taken place: in particular the Karmel and Keeves reviews. In 2017, there were 514 Schools and approximately 172,000 students within the department.

== Administration ==
The Minister for Education in the state government of South Australia is responsible to Cabinet for the department. The chief executive officer is responsible for administration of the department under the Minister. Until recent years, the CEO title was Director-General of Education. The list of Ministers below includes Ministers since 1963.

- Office of the Chief Executive
- Office of the Deputy Chief Executive
- Office of Schools
- Office of Child Development
- Policy and Communications
- Finance and Infrastructure
- Aboriginal, Student and Family Services
- Teaching and Learning Services
- Human Resources and Workforce Development

== History ==
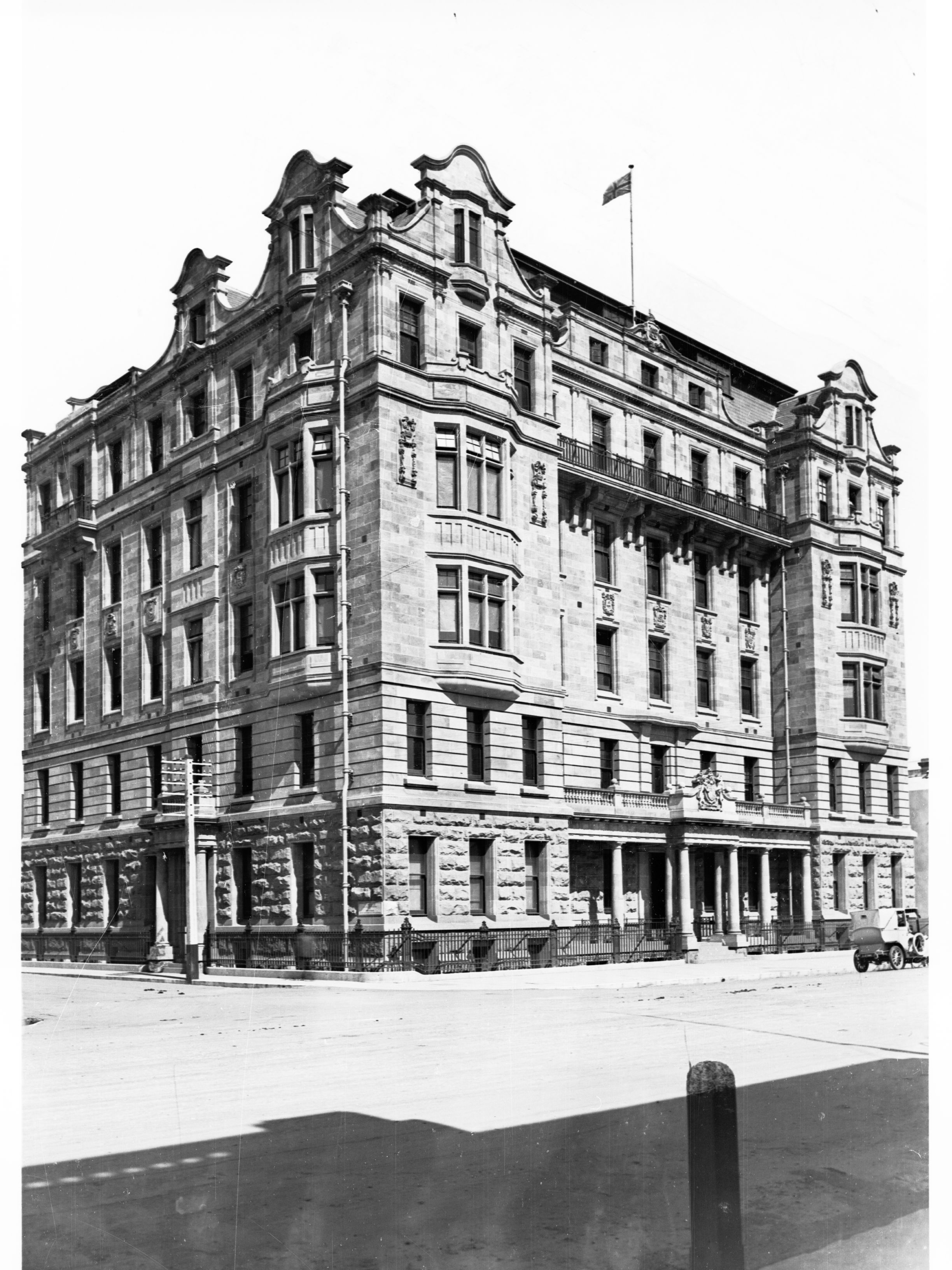
Education Department building, corner of Gawler Place and Flinders St Adelaide, circa 1925

The early settlers believed in a non-conformist tradition of self-help and opposed any State involvement in community services such as schooling where volunteerism could fill the role. They also opposed special privileges being given to the established church. Soon after settlement in 1836, there were moves to set up community schools, often run by a church. They charged fees to support the teacher. One such school opened in 1847 at Mitcham, a few miles south of Adelaide, with Thomas Mugg being the teacher, a former cabinet maker. Interest in State involvement in schooling had changed by 1851 when the new Legislative Council passed the Education Act 1851 which established a Board of Education. The Act made provision for support for school buildings and a stipend for teachers, paving the way for universal elementary education. However, South Australia was the first state to make a clear separation between church and state in schooling. Only schools that provided non-denominational religious instruction were given support.

In Britain and across Australia, the idea of State education grew rapidly during the 1860s to 1870s culminated in South Australia with the Education Act 1875 which established the Education Department more or less as it exists today. The act provided for free and compulsory education for children from 7 to 13. By the turn of the century South Australia was becoming more prosperous and the need for a well educated population was becoming more evident. The idea of universal State education was a new concept for society at that time and debate continued about the nature of the education to be provided. A major issue was whether there should be a religious element in the instruction. South Australia dealt with the issue through Australia's first referendum, the 1896 South Australian referendum. The voters decisively supported the existing system, rejecting scripture classes and capitalisation support for religious schools.

=== 1900 ===
There was almost no teacher training and the curriculum was largely devoted to rote learning. The University of Adelaide offered to take responsibility for teacher training and the University Training College opened in 1900. Secondary education at this time was only provided through fee paying private schools. In 1908, Adelaide High School opened, the first free State high school in Australia.

The number of free high schools spread slowly and in 1915 only amounted to 6.2 secondary pupils per thousand people. However this grew to 73 per thousand 1969. The focus of secondary education was strongly academic, following the English grammar school tradition. The Depression and World War II brought significant disruption to the education system. Teacher salaries were reduced during the Depression. The Qualifying Certificate was an important assessment at the end of primary schooling, indicating a standard of elementary literacy and numeracy. The Qualifying Certificate was abolished in 1942 indicating that this level of educational achievement was no longer relevant and high school education was the norm.

=== 1950 ===
During the 1950s, the school curriculum was standard across the state. In primary schools, there the same texts were used in all schools and there was little variation between schools in what was taught. By the end of the decade, the greatest problem was the very rapid growth in enrolments due to a higher birth rate, large scale immigration and high school students staying at school longer. The demand for teachers is illustrated by the opening of new Teachers Colleges: Wattle Park in 1957, Western in 1962, Bedford Park in 1966 and Salisbury in 1968.

During the latter part of the 1960s, widespread social changes began to impact on the education sector both in schools and tertiary education sectors. There was a growing concern in the school sector for a more child-centred focus and in teachers having greater flexibility in their teaching methods. In 1970, the Director-General of Education, Alby Jones, released the Freedom and Authority Memorandum which stated quite unequivocally that principals were in control of their schools and had the power to develop a school ethos, interpret how curriculum guidelines were implemented and generally take responsibility for the school's manner of operation. The memorandum gained nationwide attention as an explicit statement of a change in philosophy in the operation of a major government department—towards more local control and more democratic approaches. It was followed by the establishment of School Councils which increased the authority of parents to oversee the direction of their local school. While the Director-General was urging principals to exercise local control there was a matching expectation of principals to share school decision making with their staff.

In this climate of rapid change, the government commissioned a major review of education in the state which was published in 1971. Titled the Report of the Committee of Enquiry into Education in South Australia 1969–70 it was generally known as the Karmel Report. The report of 649 pages was very comprehensive and stimulated widespread reflection and change. Professor Karmel was later commissioned to head a similar review into Australian education which was published in 1985.

During the mid 1970s, many new schools were built and in the primary sector in particular these were designed on the 'open-space teaching' model. Individual classrooms were replaced with larger open spaces of up to eight classes. They were designed to encourage teachers to work cooperatively and for children to be able to use withdrawal rooms and group work spaces.

=== 1980 ===
In 1981, the department published a major policy document titled Into the 80s. Our schools and their purposes. It outlined a progressive view of the purposes of schools with eight areas of the curriculum, four priorities and twelve expectations. In continued, the emphasis on strong local school influence on the curriculum and education of the "whole child".

After nine years of Labor government, the new Liberal government commissioned a second major review of South Australian schools and its report was published in 1982, known as the Keeves Report. The report recommended greater specificity in the curriculum and observed that Into the 80s gave little indication of the degree of emphasis required for a large number of expectations. It also recommended that the curriculum of each school be reviewed on a regular basis.

In 2012, the Family Services Department and Education Department were combined as The Department of Education and Child Development in an attempt to provide more unified services for children. The arrangement became controversial following highly publicised investigation by the state Ombudsman into the reporting of child abuse incident. The departments were separated in 2016.

== Education Development Centre ==
The Education Development Centre in the inner western suburb of Hindmarsh is a conference centre owned by the department, for use by the department, the wider education sector and for private hire by the business sector.

== Ministers of Education ==
Minister	Tenure Began	Tenure Ended	Government	Department Formation
Baden Pattinson	15 December 1953	10 March 1965	Liberal & Country League (Playford)	Department of Education
Ronald Loveday	10 March 1965	16 April 1968	Labor (Walsh & Dunstan I)	Department of Education
Joyce Steele	17 April 1968	2 March 1970	Liberal & Country League (Hall)	Department of Education
John Coumbe	2 March 1970	2 June 1970	Liberal & Country League (Hall)	Department of Education
Hugh Hudson	6 June 1970	24 June 1975	Labor (Dunstan II)	Department of Education
Don Hopgood	24 June 1975	18 September 1979	Labor (Dunstan II)	Department of Education
Harold Allison	18 September 1979	10 November 1982	Liberal (Dr Tonkin)	Department of Education
Lynn Arnold	10 November 1982	18 December 1985	Labor (Dr Bannon) & (Dr Arnold)	Department of Education
Greg Crafter	18 December 1985	1 October 1992	Labor (Dr Bannon) & (Dr Arnold)	Department of Education
Susan Lenehan	1 October 1992	11 December 1993	Labor (Dr Bannon) & (Dr Arnold)	Department of Education, Employment and Training (DEET)
Robert Lucas	14 December 1993	20 October 1997	Liberal (Brown), Olsen & Kerin)	Department of Education and Children's Services (DECS)
Malcolm Buckby	20 October 1997	14 February 2000	Liberal (Brown), Olsen & Kerin)	Department of Education and Children's Services (DECS)
Malcolm Buckby	14 February 2000	5 March 2002	Liberal (Brown), Olsen & Kerin)	Department of Education and Children's Services (DECS)
Trish White	6 March 2002	5 March 2004	Labor (Rann) & Weatherill)	Department of Education and Children's Services (DECS)
Jane Lomax-Smith	5 March 2004	24 July 2008	Labor (Rann) & Weatherill)	Department of Education and Children's Services (DECS)
Jane Lomax-Smith	24 July 2008	25 March 2010	Labor (Rann) & Weatherill)	Department of Education
Jay Weatherill	25 March 2010	21 October 2011	Labor (Rann) & Weatherill)	Department of Education
Grace Portolesi	21 October 2011	21 January 2013	Labor (Rann) & Weatherill)	Department of Education and Child Development (DECD)
Jennifer Rankine	21 January 2013	3 February 2015	Labor (Rann) & Weatherill)	Department of Education and Child Development (DECD)
Susan Close	3 February 2015	19 March 2018	Labor (Rann) & Weatherill)	Department of Education and Child Development (DECD)
John Gardner	22 March 2018	21 March 2022	Liberal (Marshall)	Department for Education
Blair Boyer	24 March 2022	Incumbent	Labor (Malinauskas)	Department for Education

Between governments, at various periods, Premiers have acted as Minister of Education. (Note: Steven Marshall between 19 March and 21 March 2018. Peter Malinauskas between 21 March and 24 March 2022.)
