= John Downer =

Australian politician

The Honourable Sir John Downer KCMG KC
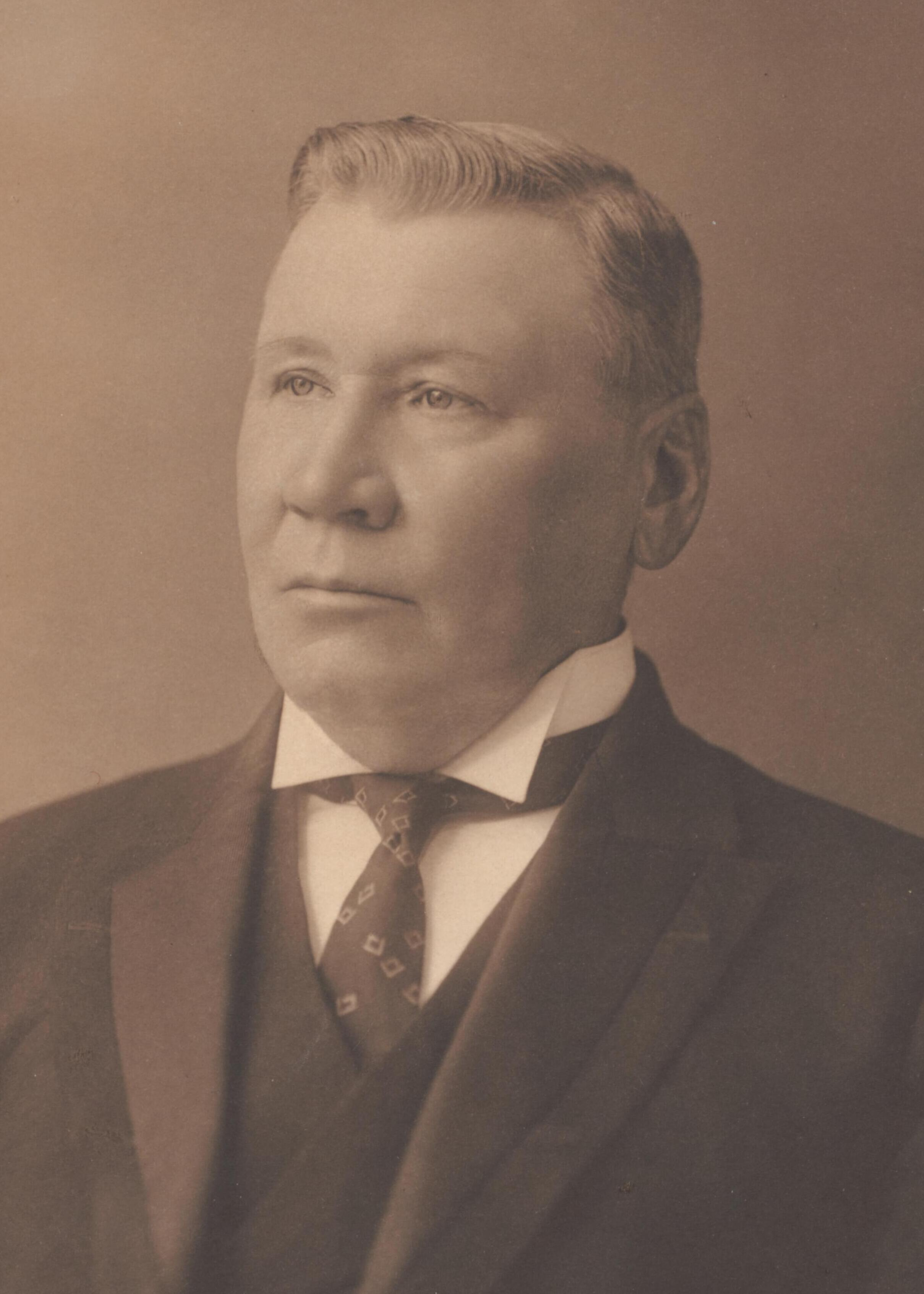
- Downer in 1900

16th Premier of South Australia
- In office 16 June 1885 – 11 June 1887
- Monarch: Victoria
- Governor: Sir William Robinson
- Preceded by: John Colton
- Succeeded by: Thomas Playford II
- In office 15 October 1892 – 16 June 1893
- Monarch: Victoria
- Governor: Earl of Kintore
- Preceded by: Frederick Holder
- Succeeded by: Charles Kingston

3rd Leader of the Opposition (SA)
- In office 1885–1885
- Preceded by: John Cox Bray
- Succeeded by: Jenkin Coles
- In office 1887–1889
- Preceded by: Thomas Playford II
- Succeeded by: John Cockburn
- In office 1893–1895
- Preceded by: Frederick Holder
- Succeeded by: William Copley
- In office 1897–1899
- Preceded by: William Copley
- Succeeded by: Vaiben Louis Solomon

Senator for South Australia
- In office 30 March 1901 – 31 December 1903

Personal details
- Born: John William Downer; 6 July 1843 Adelaide, South Australia
- Died: 2 August 1915 (aged 72) North Adelaide, South Australia
- Party: National Defence League; Protectionist (1901–03); Liberal Union (1910–15)
- Spouses: Elizabeth Henderson (m. 1871–1896) Una Russell (m. 1899)
- Relations: George Downer (brother); Henry Downer (brother); Alick Downer (son); Alexander Downer (grandson)

Sir John William Downer, KCMG, KC (6 July 1843 – 2 August 1915) was an Australian politician who served two terms as Premier of South Australia, from 1885 to 1887 and again from 1892 to 1893. He later entered federal politics and served as a Senator for South Australia from 1901 to 1903. He was the first of four Australian politicians from the Downer family dynasty.

== Early life ==
Downer was born in Adelaide on 6 July 1843. He was one of four sons born to Jane (née Field) and Henry Downer; his father was a tailor. His parents had immigrated from England to South Australia in 1838, among the first waves of British immigrants brought out by the South Australian Company.

Downer began his education at a private academy in Adelaide. He went on to attend St Peter's College, Adelaide, on a scholarship. In 1862 he took first prize in the statewide examinations. Downer followed his older brother Henry Edward Downer into the legal profession, serving his articles of clerkship with Henry and with James Boucaut. He was called to the bar in 1867. He subsequently went into practice with his younger brother George Downer, with their firm G. & J. Downer becoming "one of the leading Adelaide law firms for the next sixty years".

== South Australian politics ==
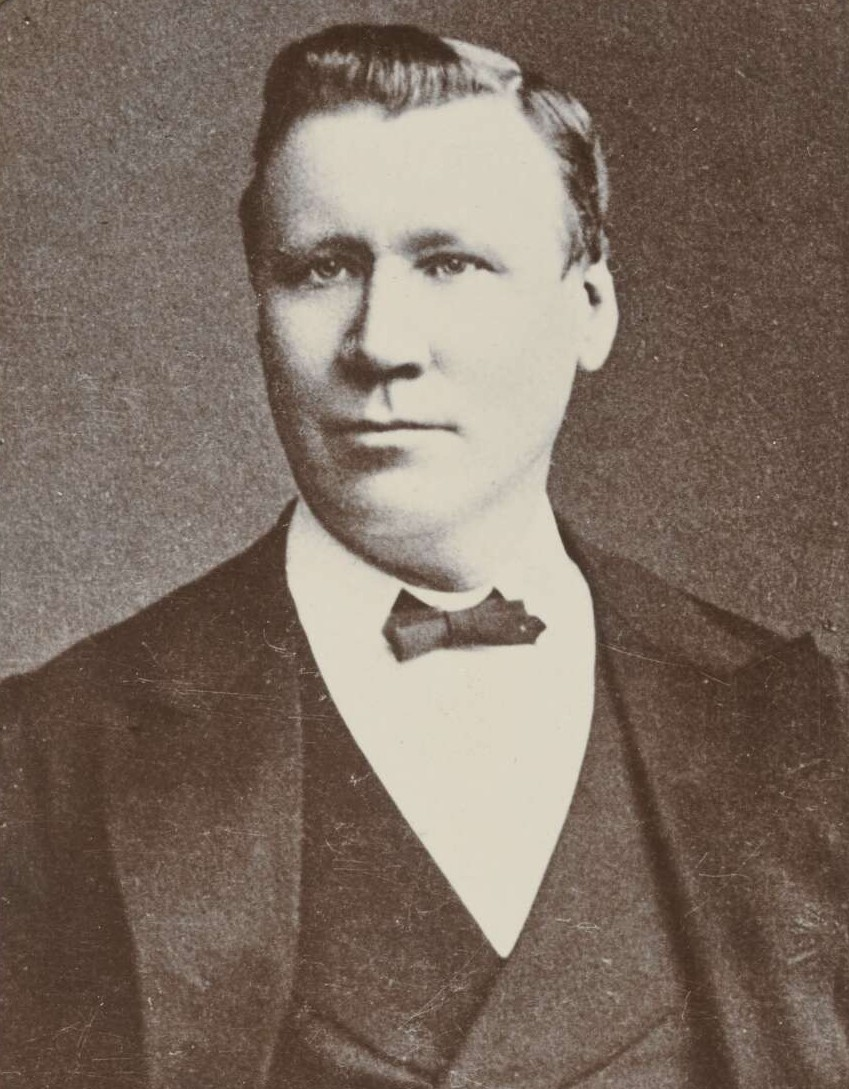
Downer in 1898

Downer was elected unopposed to the South Australian House of Assembly at the 1878 general election, standing in the two-member seat of Barossa. He continued to represent Barossa until his resignation to enter federal parliament in 1901. His electorate spanned from Gawler across the Barossa Valley to the River Murray; his primary support base was in Gawler.

In June 1881, Downer was appointed attorney-general in the ministry formed by John Cox Bray, serving until the government's defeat after the 1884 election. He introduced a number of legal reforms, notably the Married Women's Property Act 1883 which abolished the law of coverture and allowed married woman to own property, enter into contracts and take part in lawsuits in their own right. He was an early advocate of universal women's suffrage and opposed attempts to include a property qualification, although he did not support the right of women to stand for parliament. He also succeeded in carrying bills allowing accused persons to give evidence on oath, and amending the insolvency and marriage acts.

On 16 June 1885, Downer himself became Premier for the first time, as well as being Attorney-General once again. While Premier, Downer oversaw the construction of the first train line from Adelaide to Melbourne. He also made significant contributions to establishing irrigation settlements along the Murray River. Although this ministry lasted two years and passed a fair amount of legislation, it was often in difficulties, and in June 1886 had to be reconstructed.

At the Colonial Conference held in London during 1887, Downer represented South Australia, but during his return journey to Australia his government was defeated. This ministry was responsible for a tariff imposing increased protective duties. Downer was not in office again for several years, but in October 1892 again became Premier, taking also the portfolio of Chief Secretary. In May 1893 he exchanged this for the position of Treasurer of South Australia, but was ousted at the 1893 election by liberal Protectionist Kingston with the support of the new Labor Party led by John McPherson. Downer remarked of this party: 'They are very clever fellows. I have great respect for the way they use either side for their purposes with absolute impartiality'. For most of the period until 1899 Downer led the Opposition.

== Federation movement ==
Downer was a strong federalist and had represented South Australia at the 1883 and 1891 conventions. At the latter meeting, he took an important part in protecting the interests of the smaller states, and was a member of the constitutional committee. He was elected one of the 10 representatives of South Australia at the Australasian Federal Convention of 1897–8, and sat, again, on the constitutional committee. He was the most senior and significant representative of the conservative portion of the convention's ideological spectrum. In this period he formed a close personal bond with several leading Federationists. Robert Garran, an eminence grise of the Federalist cause, was the best man at Downer's wedding in 1898. Richard O'Connor and Edmund Barton were among the attendees. The bride and groom had first met at Barton's house, and in these years Barton would stay at Downer's house when in Adelaide.

== Federal politics ==
Downer was elected to the Senate at the inaugural 1901 federal election, placing fourth in the poll and winning election to a three-year term. He was endorsed by the Australasian National League. He campaigned closely with fellow conservative Richard Baker. On the hustings he declared he "was not a Free Trader, and not a Protectionist", but "a Fair Trader". In parliament he repeated that he was "abstractedly a free-trader but by force of circumstance a fair trader".

In parliament, Downer served on the standing orders committee and chaired the elections and qualifications committee, which notably denied Henry Saunders' petition to unseat Alexander Matheson from a Western Australian seat. He spoke frequently on the Senate's role and importance, stressing "the independence of the Senate and its crucial role as the protector of the smaller states". He "doggedly defended the Senate's constitutional rights" including the principle that it might remove governments, although he opposed attempts to delay a supply bill as against Westminster convention. According to one biographer, he sometimes appeared "more concerned with constitutional proprieties and procedures than with the substance of the legislation being considered".

Downer generally supported the Protectionist government formed by Edmund Barton, although he often crossed the floor and was critical of individual pieces of legislation. He believed the Immigration Restriction Act 1901 should not be given a high priority and criticised "this general running amok with the name of white Australia". Downer opposed the government's bill to grant sugar-growers a bounty and was equivocal about the Commonwealth Franchise Act 1902 and other electoral legislation. He did support the Naval Agreement Act 1903, which defined the terms on which Australian personnel would serve in the Royal Navy before the creation of an independent Australian Navy.

Downer took a particular interest in the passage of the Judiciary Act 1903, which created the High Court of Australia as envisaged in the constitution. During the debate on the bill he made "a long and eloquent defence of Federation and the role of the High Court as the defender of the smaller states". Downer hoped to be appointed as one of the inaugural justices of the High Court, based on his role in drafting the constitution, his status as a leading constitutional lawyer, and his personal friendship with Barton. His name was considered by cabinet but was ultimately rejected, with Barton himself becoming one of the three inaugural justices along with Samuel Griffith and Richard O'Connor. According to Peter Bartlett, Downer's failure to secure appointment as an inaugural justice of the High Court was "the great disappointment of his life".

== Final years ==
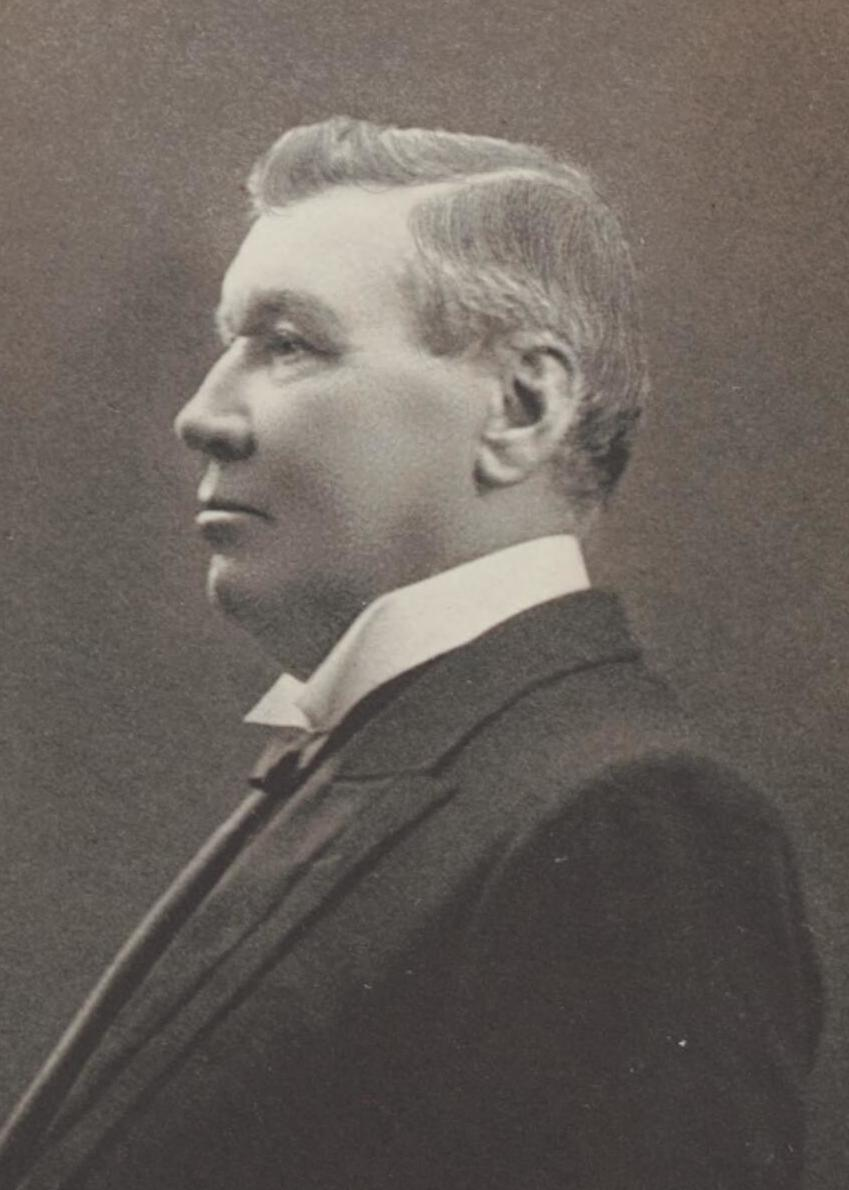
Undated photo by Hammer Studios

Downer declined to re-contest his Senate seat at the 1903 election. His primary motivation for retirement was financial, as his legal practice had suffered from his frequent absences in Melbourne. He subsequently resumed an active practice at the bar and made frequent appearances in the Supreme Court of South Australia. In 1905, Downer was elected to the South Australian Legislative Council as a member for the Southern District. He was re-elected in 1912 and remained a member of the Legislative Council until his death.

Downer died of cancer at his home in North Adelaide on 2 August 1915, aged 72. He was interred at North Road Cemetery. His estate was valued for probate at £14,190 (equivalent to $1,640,000 in 2022).

== Character and views ==
Alfred Deakin assessed Downer in the following terms: 'bull-headed, and rather thick-necked, ... with the dogged set of the mouth of a prize fighter' and 'smallish eyes'. Downer was regarded a first-rate barrister, and some of his speeches to juries were singled out by contemporaries as laudable examples of forensic art. He was equally successful in parliamentary debate; one of his colleagues called him the best debater in a house that contained Charles Kingston, Frederick Holder, John Cockburn, and John Jenkins.

In politics Downer tended to be conservative without being obstinate. He described himself as a Tory, and partly on account of this he often found himself in a minority during his later years in parliament. Nevertheless, he consistently advocated the rights of married women to their own property, female suffrage, protection of local industries, and federation.

Historian Tony Roberts, in his 2005 award-winning book Frontier Justice: A History of the Gulf Country to 1900, described the nature of massacres and violent encounters with Aboriginal peoples in the Gulf Country as part of the Australian frontier wars. His research showed that senior colonial politicians, including premiers Downer and Sir John Colton, along with South Australian police, "masterminded, condoned or concealed... atrocities" in the NT Gulf Country, which led to the deaths of at least 600 Aboriginal people. According to Henry Reynolds, Roberts concluded that Downer's name occurred with greater frequency than any of his colleagues, and he pointed out that Downer, as a trained lawyer, attorney-general between 1881 and 1884, and both premier and attorney-general 1885–1887, he must have deliberately ignored the Aboriginal rights which were embodied by law in the pastoral leases in that area. He also appeared as attorney for William Willshire, a policeman known for his brutality who was acquitted of the murder of a group of Aboriginal people in 1891 at Tempe Downs Station in the NT. Even at the time, there was outrage at the not guilty verdict, and questioning of the validity of the process, which took place in Port Augusta.

== Family and legacy ==
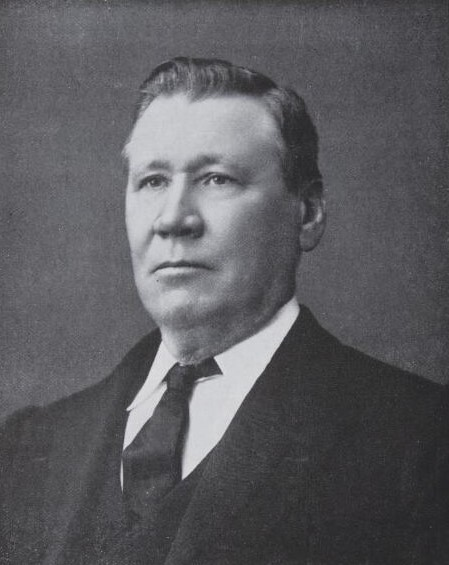
Downer in 1901

Downer married twice: firstly in 1871 to Elizabeth Henderson (c. 1852 – 3 May 1896), daughter of the controversial Rev. James Henderson; and secondly, in Sydney 29 November 1899 to Una Stella Haslingden Russell, daughter of Henry Edward Russell. (Note: Una Stella Haslingden Russell (born 1871 at Goulburn), is not related to Henry Chamberlain Russell, notwithstanding the report in the article "Interesting Weddings". Her parents being prominent accountant Henry Edward Russell and Frances Emily Russell née Robey daughter of Ralph Mayer Robey, MLC.) With Elizabeth he had three children, John Henry (born 1872), James Frederick (born 1874) and Harold Sydney (born in 1875 and died in infancy). The son of his second marriage was Alexander Russell "Alick" Downer (born 1910), who served in the Menzies government, was knighted, and served as Australian High Commissioner in London, and whose son, Alexander Downer served as leader of the (Opposition) Liberal party in 1994 and Foreign Minister in the Howard government.

The home he purchased in 1880 at 42 Pennington Terrace, North Adelaide, is now St Mark's College and the original part of the building is known as Downer House. A draft of the Australian Constitution was prepared in the ballroom in 1897.

A brother and partner in his business, Henry Edward Downer (1836–1905), entered the South Australian parliament in 1881 and was attorney-general in the John Cockburn ministry from May to August 1890. Another brother, A(lexander) George Downer (1839–1916) was his partner in the legal firm G & J Downer and a prominent businessman.

In 1887, at the Imperial Conference in London (now the Commonwealth Heads of Government Meeting), Downer was created KCMG, recommended to the Queen by the Marquis of Salisbury. During retirement, he joined the Adelaide University Council and became president of the Commonwealth Club.

The Canberra suburb of Downer, Australian Capital Territory, was named after him in 1960. On Garema Place, Canberra stands a commemorative sculpted fountain titled Father and Son and was presented by his son Sir Alick in 1964.

== Electoral history ==
=== South Australia ===
==== House of Assembly ====
Election year	Electorate	Party	Votes	%		Result
1878	Barossa	Independent	unopposed			Elected
1881	Barossa	Independent	unopposed			Elected
1884	Barossa	Independent	502	24.0%	n/a	Elected
1887	Barossa	Independent	unopposed			Elected
1890	Barossa	Independent	658	25.4%	n/a	Elected
1893	Barossa	National Defence League	1,008	30.3%	▲4.9	Elected
1896	Barossa	National Defence League	1,549	24.5%	▼5.8	Elected
1899	Barossa	National Defence League	1,786	33.8%	▲9.3	Elected

==== Legislative Council ====
Election year	Electorate	Party	Votes	%		Result
1905	Southern District	Independent	3,800	28.3%	new	Elected
1912	Southern District	Liberal Union	7,073	36.7%	▲8.4	Elected

=== Australian Senate ===
Election year	State	Party	Votes	%		Result
1901	South Australia	Protectionist	30,493	60.6%	new	Elected (4th)

== See also ==
- Downer family
- Political families of Australia

== Sources ==
- Bartlett, Peter (1981). "Downer, Sir John William (1843–1915)". Australian Dictionary of Biography. Vol. 8. National Centre of Biography, Australian National University. pp. 330–332. ISBN 978-0-522-84459-7. ISSN 1833-7538. OCLC 70677943.
- Serle, Percival (1949). "Downer, John William". Dictionary of Australian Biography. Sydney: Angus & Robertson.
- Parliamentary Debates (South Australia), 1883–84, 2031
- Intercolonial Convention, 1883: Report of the Proceedings of the Intercolonial Convention, held in Sydney, in November and December, 1883 (Syd, 1883)
- Proceedings of the Colonial Conference, 1887: Papers Laid before the Conference (Lond, 1887)
- National Australasian Convention, 1891 to 1898, Official Record of the Proceedings … (Sydney 1891, Adelaide 1897, Sydney 1898 and Melbourne 1898)
- British Australasian, 17 June 1887
- Edmund Barton papers (National Library of Australia)
- Alfred Deakin papers (National Library of Australia)
- P. M. Glynn diaries, 1880–1918 (National Library of Australia)
- The Register, Adelaide, 3 August 1915
- The Advertiser, Adelaide, 3 August 1915
- E. Hodder, The History of South Australia
- Quick and Garran, The Annotated Constitution of the Australian Commonwealth
- P. Mennell, The Dictionary of Australasian Biography

Political offices
Preceded by John Cox Bray	Leader of the Opposition of South Australia; 1884–1885	Succeeded by Jenkin Coles
Preceded by John Colton	Premier of South Australia; 1885–1887	Succeeded by Thomas Playford
Preceded by Thomas Playford	Leader of the Opposition of South Australia; 1887–1889	Succeeded by John Cockburn
Preceded by Frederick Holder	Premier of South Australia; 1892–1893	Succeeded by Charles Kingston
Preceded by Frederick Holder	Leader of the Opposition of South Australia; 1893–1895	Succeeded by William Copley
Preceded by William Copley	Leader of the Opposition of South Australia; 1897–1899	Succeeded by Vaiben Solomon
South Australian House of Assembly
Preceded by John Dunn Jr.	Member for Barossa; 1878–1901; Served alongside: Martin Basedow, James Hague	Succeeded by Ephraim Coombe
