= William Copley (South Australian politician) =

Australian politician

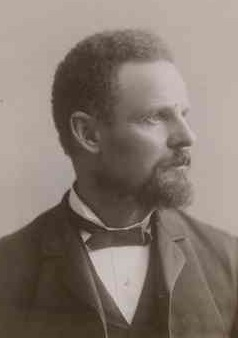

8th Leader of the Opposition of South Australia
- In office 1896–1896
- Preceded by: John Downer
- Succeeded by: John Downer

Personal details
- Born: William John Copley; 25 April 1845; Yorkshire, England
- Died: 16 September 1925; Henley Beach South, South Australia
- Political party: National Defence League (1892–94), Australasian National League (1896–02)

William John Copley (25 April 1845 – 16 September 1925) was a South Australian politician. He was a member of the South Australian House of Assembly from 1884 to 1887, representing Frome, switched to the South Australian Legislative Council from 1887 to 1894 representing Northern District, before returning to the House of Assembly from 1896 to 1904, representing Yorke Peninsula. He was Leader of the Opposition for a period in 1896, and served as Commissioner for Crown Lands and Immigration (1890-1892) and Minister for Agriculture and Education (1892) under Thomas Playford II and Chief Secretary (1893) and Minister for Agriculture and Education (1892-1893) under John Downer.

== Early life ==
Copley was born in the village of High Green, near Sheffield, England, the eldest son of James Copley and Elizabeth née Redfearn. William Copley emigrated with his family to Burra Burra in South Australia in 1849. For some years he was engaged on the Murray Flats, but from around 1877 he held a farm on the Black Rock Plains, near Orroroo, South Australia. In 1883-84 he was President of the Farmers Association.

He was a distant cousin of composer Aaron Copland.

== Career ==
Copley was elected to the South Australian House of Assembly for Frome in April 1884 along with Ebenezer Ward. In April 1887 he lost Frome but in July won a South Australian Legislative Council by-election for the Northern District. As 'a strenuous opponent' of socialism, he was a founding member in 1892 of the National Defence League (NDL), a 'counter' to the new United Labor Party at the 1893 election.

Copley was commissioner for crown lands and immigration in Thomas Playford's 1890-92 ministry. But the appointment of a legislative councillor to the position was opposed in the Lower House and he was transferred to agriculture and education. He was a 'strong farmer's advocate' and introduced progressive probate and succession duties and 'homestead block' measures, based on New Zealand legislation. This led to the inauguration of 10-acre (4 ha) holdings at Gawler Blocks, Peterborough, Cottonville and Croydon. He sat on the 1891 and 1898-99 pastoral lands commissions. Copley was minister of agriculture and education in Sir John Downer's 1892-93 ministry, and chief secretary briefly in 1893 when he piloted the bill for free education through the council.

Defeated in his Legislative Council seat in July 1894, he returned to farming and assisting the NDL. From the 1896 election to the 1902 election he sat again in the House of Assembly as member for Yorke Peninsula, and served as Leader of the Opposition in 1896, after the election. In 1902 he stood for Barossa and lost, and also failed in a bid to enter the Australian Senate for the Australasian National League (formerly NDL). A founder member and president of the Farmers and Producers Political Union from 1904, he led discussions on its amalgamation with the Liberal and Democratic Union and the NDL, resulting in the formation of the Liberal Union after the 1910 election.

== Legacy ==
Survived by his wife and four daughters, Copley died at Henley Beach South, South Australia on 16 September 1925, leaving an estate sworn for probate at £5308. His adherence to what 'he believed to be fair and right' had shown particularly in the South African War; as an Imperialist, he disliked the South Australian emblem outside Government House, and it 'excited a good deal of public attention' when he removed the flag and demanded that the Union Jack be hoisted. He was reserved but kindly, described by the Observer as 'not a genius' but 'a good, capable, inflexibly honest legislator'. The town of Copley commemorates him.

== See also ==
- Hundred of Copley

South Australian House of Assembly
New district	Member for Frome; 1884–1887; Served alongside: Ebenezer Ward	Succeeded by Clement Giles
Preceded by Arthur Short	Member for Yorke Peninsula; 1896–1902; Served alongside: John Shannon	District abolished
Political offices
Preceded by John Downer	Leader of the Opposition of South Australia; 1896	Succeeded by John Downer
