= Downer family =

Australian family tree

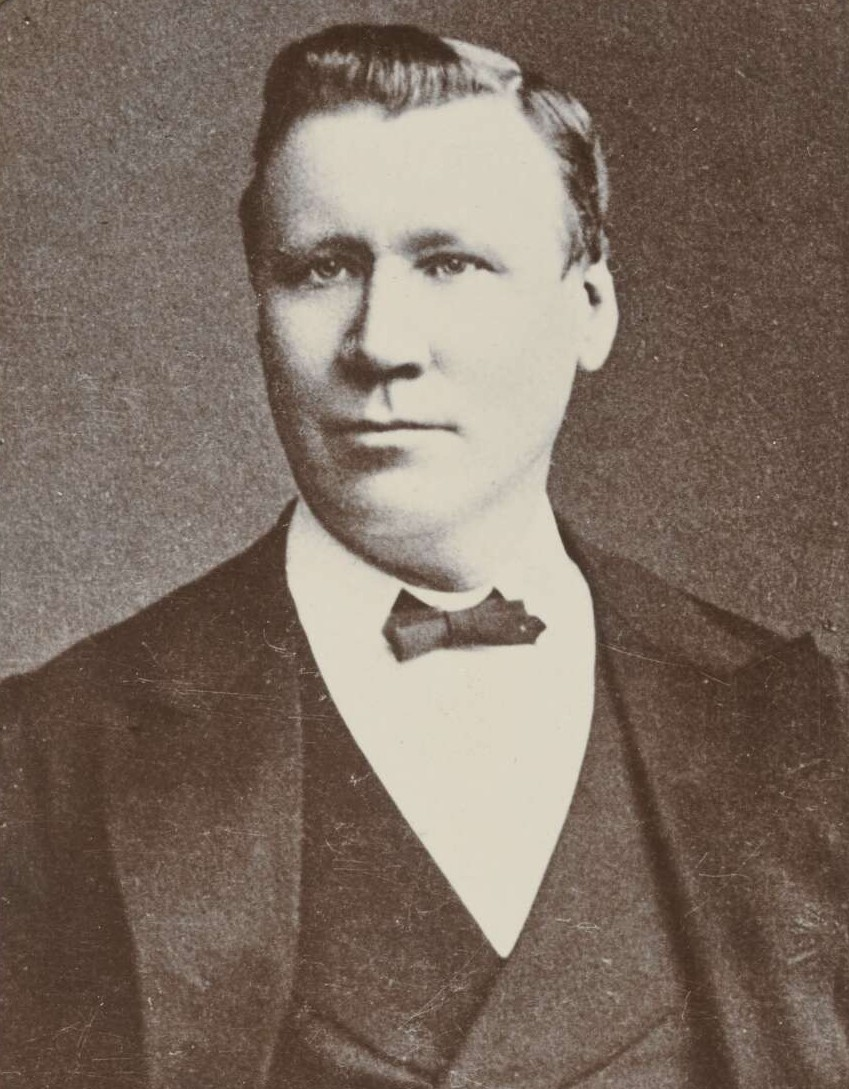
John Downer

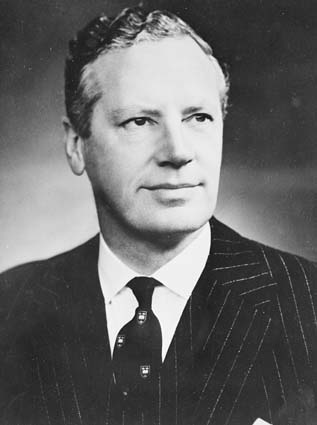
Alick Downer

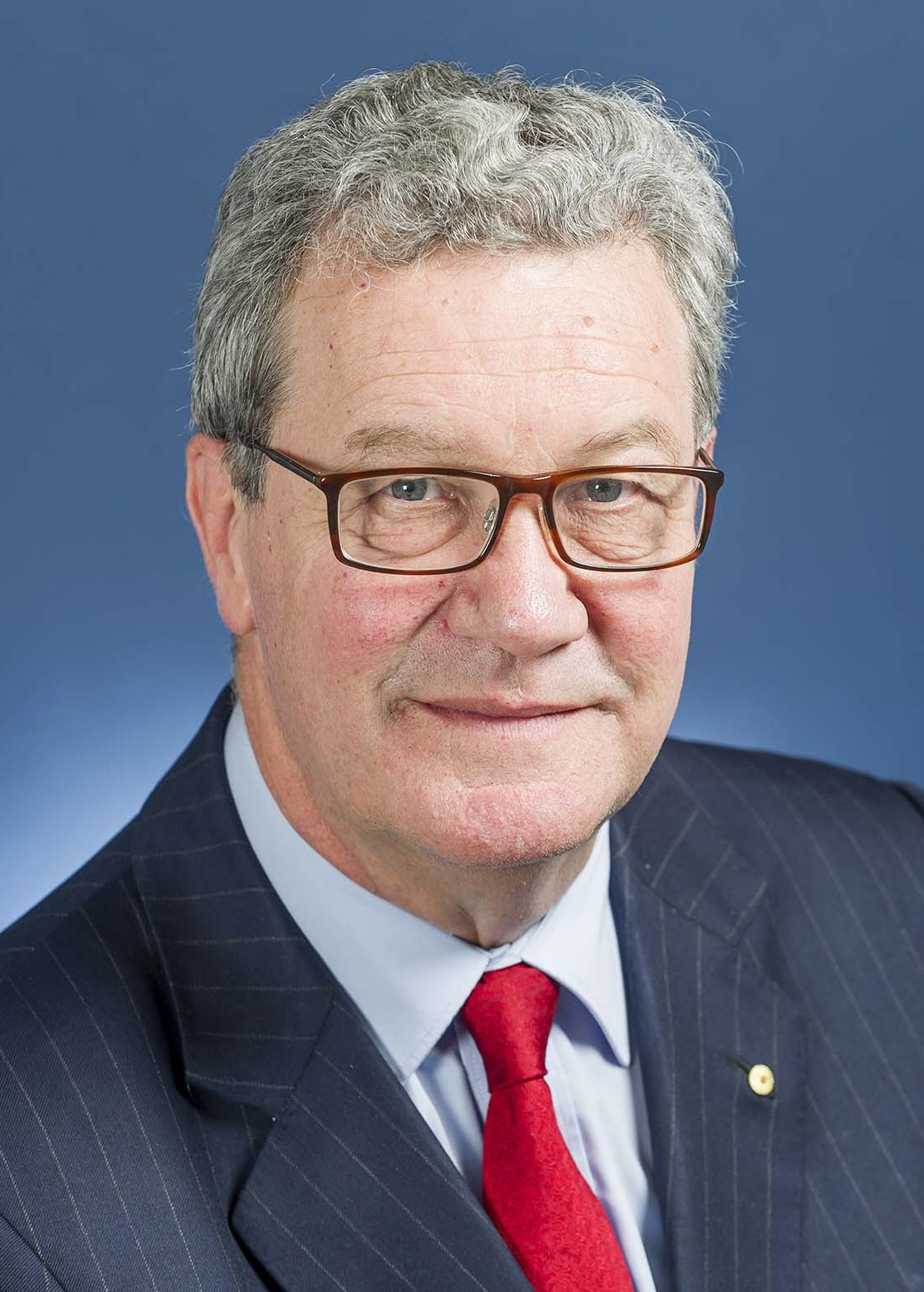
Alexander Downer

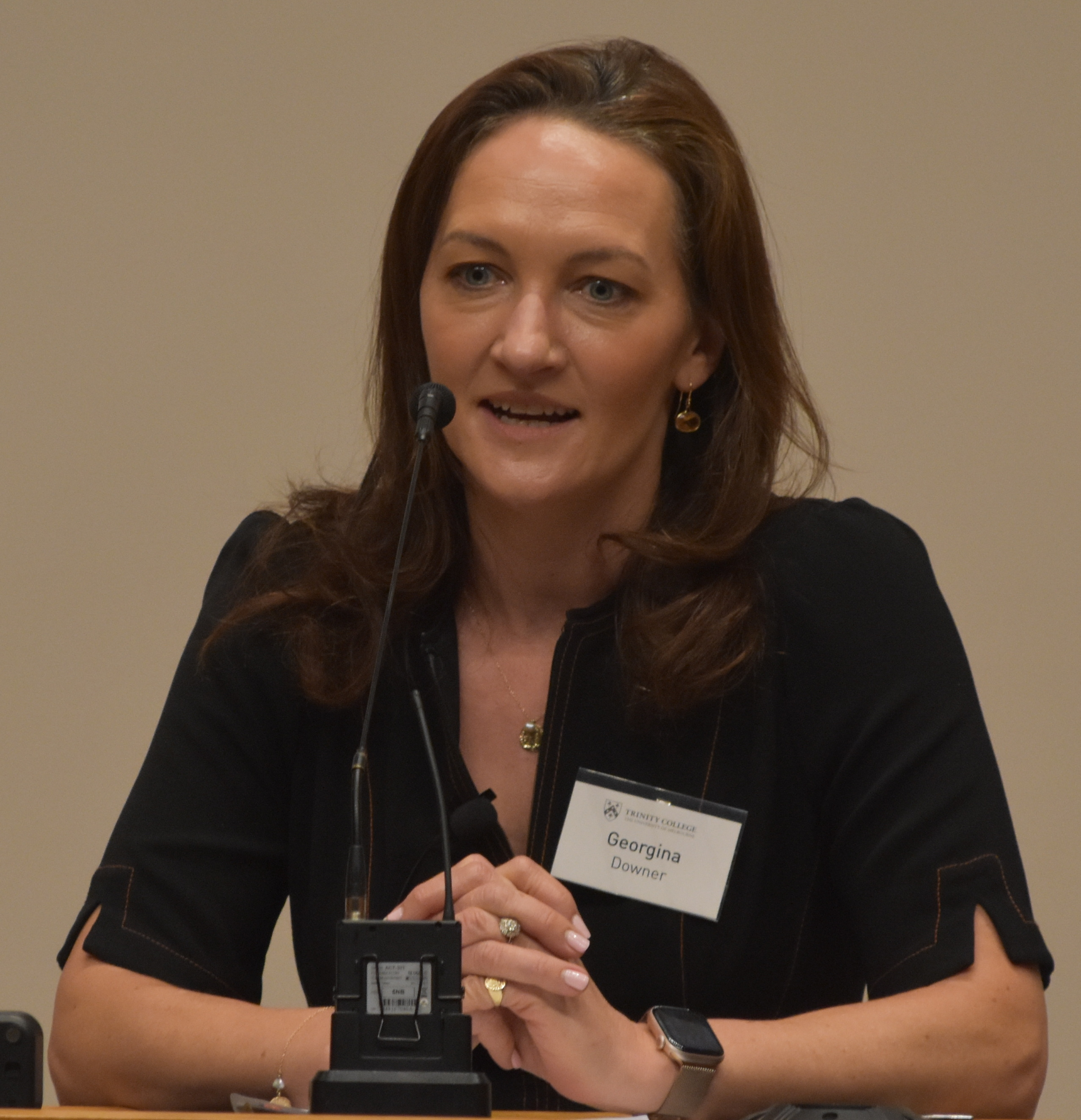
Georgina Downer

The Downer family have played a prominent role in South Australian and Australian politics. Their earliest ancestors were Mary Ann Downer (1792–1868) and her son Henry Downer, a tailor (1811–1870), who travelled from England to Australia in 1862, settling in Adelaide.

Name	Birth name	Alive	Occupation	Office	Parents	Spouse	Notes
Henry Downer	Henry Downer	1811–1870	Tailor			Jane Field	Arrived from England aboard the Eden on 24 February 1838
George Downer	Alexander George Downer	1839–1916	Barrister, journalist, businessman		Henry Downer and Jane Downer (née Field)	unmarried	
John Downer	John William Downer	1843–1915	Partner in the legal firm G & J Downer	Premier of South Australia 1885 – 1887, 1892 – 1893	Henry Downer and Jane Downer (née Field)	Elizabeth Henderson Una Stella Haslingden Russell	Una Russell remarried in 1919, to D’Arcy Wentworth Addison.
Henry Edward Downer		1836–1905	lawyer, businessman, politician		Henry Downer and Jane Downer (née Field)	Maria Martin Haggar	
Alick Downer	Alexander Russell Downer	1910–1981		Minister for Immigration, Australian 1958 – 1963 High Commissioner in London; 1964 – 1972	John William Downer and Una Stella Haslingden Downer (née Russell)	Mary Isobel Gosse	
Mary Downer	Mary Isobel Gosse	1924–2014			James Hay Gosse and Joanna Lang Gosse (née Barr Smith)	Alick Downer	
Alexander Downer		1951 –		Minister for Foreign Affairs 1996 – 2007; Opposition Leader (Liberal Party); 1994 – 1995	Alick Downer and Mary Downer (née Gosse)	Nicola Robinson	
Georgina Downer	Georgina Mary Beatrice Downer	1979–	Lawyer, diplomat, political adviser		Alexander Downer and Nicola Rosemary "Nicky" Downer (née Robinson)	Will Heath	Contested elections in 2018 and 2019 for Mayo as the endorsed Liberal candidate, in both cases unsuccessfully.

== See also ==
- Political families of Australia
