= Henry Edward Downer =

Australian politician

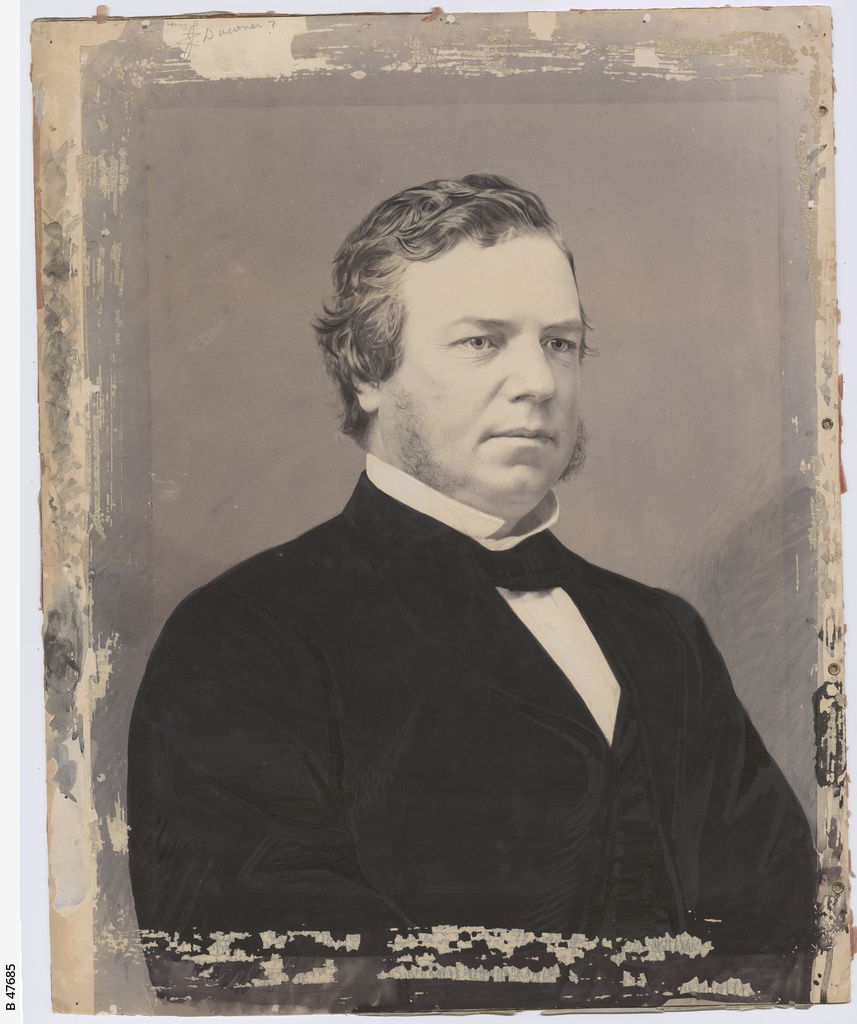
Henry Edward Downer (c 1880)

Henry Edward Downer (22 March 1836 – 4 August 1905) was a South Australian politician. He was a brother of Sir John Downer and George Downer, and a noted lawyer and businessman.

Henry Edward Downer was born in Portsmouth, England and emigrated to Australia in 1838 with his parents Henry (ca.1812 – 25 September 1870) and Jane (ca.1808 – 4 Jan 1861), arriving in Adelaide in June 1838. His father ran a grocery store in Hindley Street (at that time Adelaide's premier shopping strip), in 1848 took on as partner Thomas Graves, who bought him out two years later, later was landlord of the Blenheim Hotel on the same street; they lived first at Hindley Street, followed by South Terrace, then at "St. Bernard's", Magill, where he died after a long illness.

Henry received an education at Francis Haire's academy and was articled to the legal firm of Wigley & Richman, working for a time as law clerk. He was called to the Bar in 1859.

He was appointed Commissioner for Insolvency in 1865 and filled that position until 1881 when he resigned in order to contest the South Australian House of Assembly for the seat of Encounter Bay. He entered Parliament in 1881 and held the seat until 1896, for two of those terms in conjunction with Simpson Newland.

He was appointed Attorney-General of South Australia in May 1890 in the Cockburn ministry, succeeding F. F. Turner (solicitor to the Lands Titles Office; a temporary appointment of April that year following the defeat at the polls of B. A. Moulden), and lost the post with the swearing-in of the Playford government the following year. His political achievements included:

- conversion of the Strathalbyn to Victor Harbor horse tramway to steam locomotive.
- amendments to Insolvency laws
- amendments to Rent laws in 1883 to protect tenants

He was an active Freemason and office-holder of the Anglican Church. He was a keen horseman and twice appointed master of the Adelaide Hunt Club. He served as steward for the Adelaide Racing Club.

== Family ==
H. E. Downer married Maria Martin Haggar ( – 11 January 1912) on 13 August 1859. They had a home "Lyndhurst" on South Terrace, Adelaide. Their children included:

- Ada Louisa Downer (23 November 1860 – 1941) married Otto Heinrich Schomburgk (1857–1938), son of Moritz Richard Schomburgk, on 17 September 1892
- Bear Thomas Schatmeier (12 June 1862 – ) married Charles Herbert Warren (c. 1856 – 6 November 1917) on 7 February 1891.

- (Constance) Jean Warren (1891–1977) married the widower Lavington Bonython on 11 December 1912. She was later well known as Lady Bonython OBE. They had three children: Warren, Katherine and Kym.
She married again, to the widower Samuel Bruce Rudall (7 March 1859 – 3 January 1945), on 6 October 1923.

- Frank Hagger Downer (18 October 1863 – 19 March 1938) married Charlotte Mary Murray (died 15 September 1920), youngest daughter of A. B. Murray on 8 August 1900
- (Harold) Charles Downer (24 August 1865 – 27 December 1921) married Bertha Law Smith ( – 11 July 1947) on 17 February 1909. He was manager of Melton station.

He died at the home of his son-in-law Otto Schomburgk.

== See also ==
- Downer family
- Political families of Australia
