= Francis Haire =

Australian academic

Francis Haire (c. 1811 – 24 June 1864) was an Irish born schoolmaster in the early days of Adelaide and the colony of South Australia. His Albert House Academy, the first Adelaide school of academic distinction, ran from 1850 to 1863.

== History ==
Francis Haire was born in Ireland, a son of John Haire of Glaslough, County Monaghan. He graduated AB from Trinity College, Dublin and had sixteen years' experience of teaching, including five years in Europe. He married and had a son before his wife died, but further information is yet to be found. In 1848 he married Jane Jude, and in 1849 they emigrated to South Australia aboard Madawaska, arriving in July 1849, and settled in Adelaide.

In 1850 he opened his Albert House Academy on Victoria Square, whose

course of Study pursued is such as to induce habits of reflection, application, and diligence; and at the same time elicit by a firm, but moderate discipline, (from which corporeal punishment is wholly excluded), the mental capacity of the Pupils. The principles of Christianity are strictly inculcated, avoiding sectarian peculiarities and the difficulties of controversy. A liberal Classical, and Mathematical education is afforded to all the classes, including English Literature, and the Composition of Original Essays, and Epistolary Correspondence; but those more likely to be engaged in Mercantile pursuits, are carefully perfected in Arithmetic, Book-keeping in all its branches, and both plain and ornamental Penmanship.

	Day students	Boarders
Under 9 years of age	4 gn p.a.	25 gn p.a.
From 9 to 13 years of age	6 gn p.a.	30 gn p.a.
Over 13 years of age	8 gn p.a.	40 gn p.a.

In William Wyatt's 1851 survey of Government-approved and subsidised schools, of which there were 79 in South Australia, Whitby was receiving grants for 56 boys, and on the day of inspection he had 50 boys under instruction. He held what has been claimed Adelaide's first public examinations in June 1850. John L. Young, who ran the Adelaide Educational Institution, a similar school in many ways, did not hold his until June 1853.

He was, with Bonwick, W. A. Cawthorne, Arthur E. Dodwell, Charles G. Feinaigle, P. Fox, James Macgowan, Nesbit, W. Pepper, Rider, Ross, and E. W. Wickes a founding member of the Schoolmasters' Association. He and Cawthorne worshipped at Trinity Church; both served as sidemen (offering collectors).

Haire was elected City councillor for Grey ward in 1852. The Central Board of Education thereupon revoked his licence to teach, as this amounted to a second source of income. This despite the fact that several members of the Board (Wickes and Cawthorne), receiving a fee as such, were licensed teachers. Haire resigned in December 1853, effective 1 January 1854. Dr. Cotter was elected his replacement.

In March 1856 he and his family returned to Ireland, at the request of his aged father. They returned in April 1857 and re-opened the school, with many of his former students returning. By the following December examination and prizegiving, his school had been renamed the Collegiate and Commercial Institution, Albert House, Angas Street, but whether the change of address indicates a different location is not known.

Haire declared himself insolvent in June 1859, annulled shortly after. It may be pertinent that his solicitor, James Boucaut, was the father of one of his pupils.

Around mid-1859 Haire reopened his school as the "Collegiate Institute" on Whitmore Square. In November 1859 Haire applied for a licence to teach, but was refused on the grounds that there were already sufficient (subsidised) schools in the city. In January 1860 the school reopened in the old Angas Street rooms "near the Supreme Court-House, Victoria Square" and renamed Albert House Collegiate and Commercial Institute, with Rev. James Pollitt, who had a long association with Haire, serving as titular head, "aided by efficient resident Assistants" (i.e. the Haires). Haire's licence was granted in April 1860 with the withdrawal of one Mrs. Platts. In an 1861 survey of subsidised schools' incomes, Haire was credited with having 55 students, collecting £4/4s. p.a. from each, with a government stipend of £60 for a total annual income of £291.

By June 1863 the school had moved to South Terrace, and adopted the title Albert House Collegiate School.

In May 1864 Haire was again found insolvent, though his case was never heard due to his final illness.

== Teachers ==
- Howard "His very able assistant"
- Henry Nootnagel German teacher 1859
- Bouchier "under teacher" in 1861
- Mr. Syms, the second master in 1862
- Mr. Byrnes, second master in October 1862

== Notable students ==
- At least two sons of Henry Downer (George and Harold))
- Rev. James Browning

== Family ==
The widower Francis Haire married Jane Jude (c. 1829 – 20 April 1887) in St. Paul's Church, Dublin on 5 February 1848. Their children include:

- Catherine Ellen Haire (1850 – 15 June 1859) married George Rice in 1880
- Emily Jane Haire (1852– ) married Thomas Wilson in 1878
- Caroline Adelaide Haire (1857 – ) married James Anderson on 26 March 1891
- Leopold Francis Albert Haire (22 June 1859 – 10 August 1932) married Frances Ann Hambly (died 1903) c. 1881. He married again, to Catherine Mary Murnane (died 7 January 1934).
- Amelia Alexandra Haire (1863– )

One Francis Haire died in Adelaide in 1849; he may have been a son by the earlier marriage, if so, his presence on Madawska was not documented; no more information has been found.
