= Big Swoop =

Magpie sculpture in Canberra, Australia

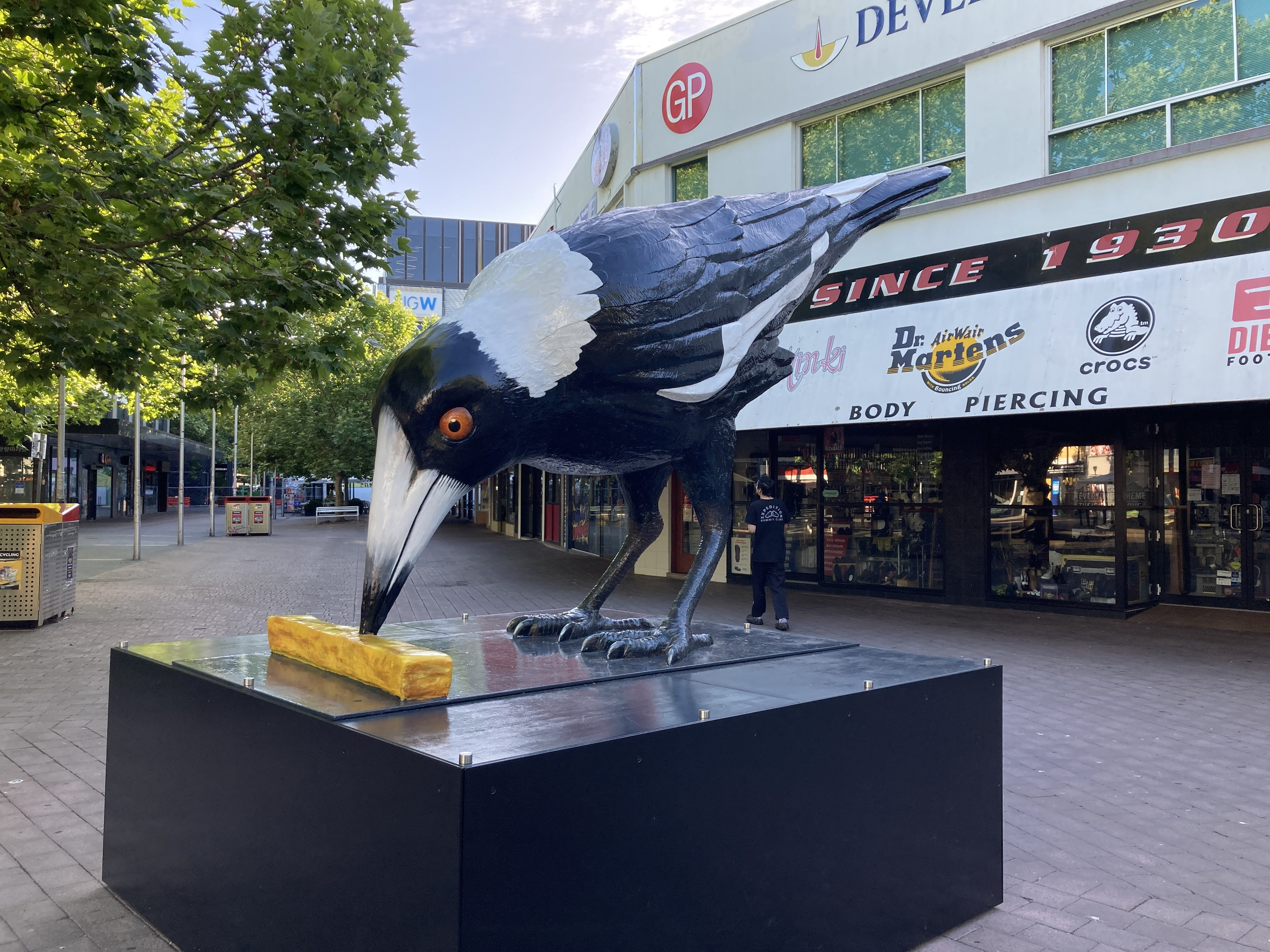
- Artist: Yanni Pounartzi
- Completion date: 2022
- Medium: Fibreglass and Steel
- Subject: Australian magpie
- Dimensions: 2.4 metres high and 3.5 metres long
- Location: Petrie Plaza, Civic, Australian Capital Territory, Australia; 35°16′42.8″S 149°7′54.8″E

Big Swoop is a sculpture located in Petrie Plaza, Civic, Australian Capital Territory. The sculpture was funded by a grant from the City Renewal Authority. It depicts an Australian magpie pecking at a chip. The sculpture was installed in Garema Place on 16 March 2022. Big Swoop weighs half a tonne, is 2.4 metres high and 3.5 metres long, and was created by Canberra resident and artist Yanni Pounartzis. It completed with the assistance of sculptor Gustavo Balboa and scenic artist Ari Maack. The sculpture was vandalised shortly after it was installed. The sculpture was sent to Sydney for repairs in April 2022.

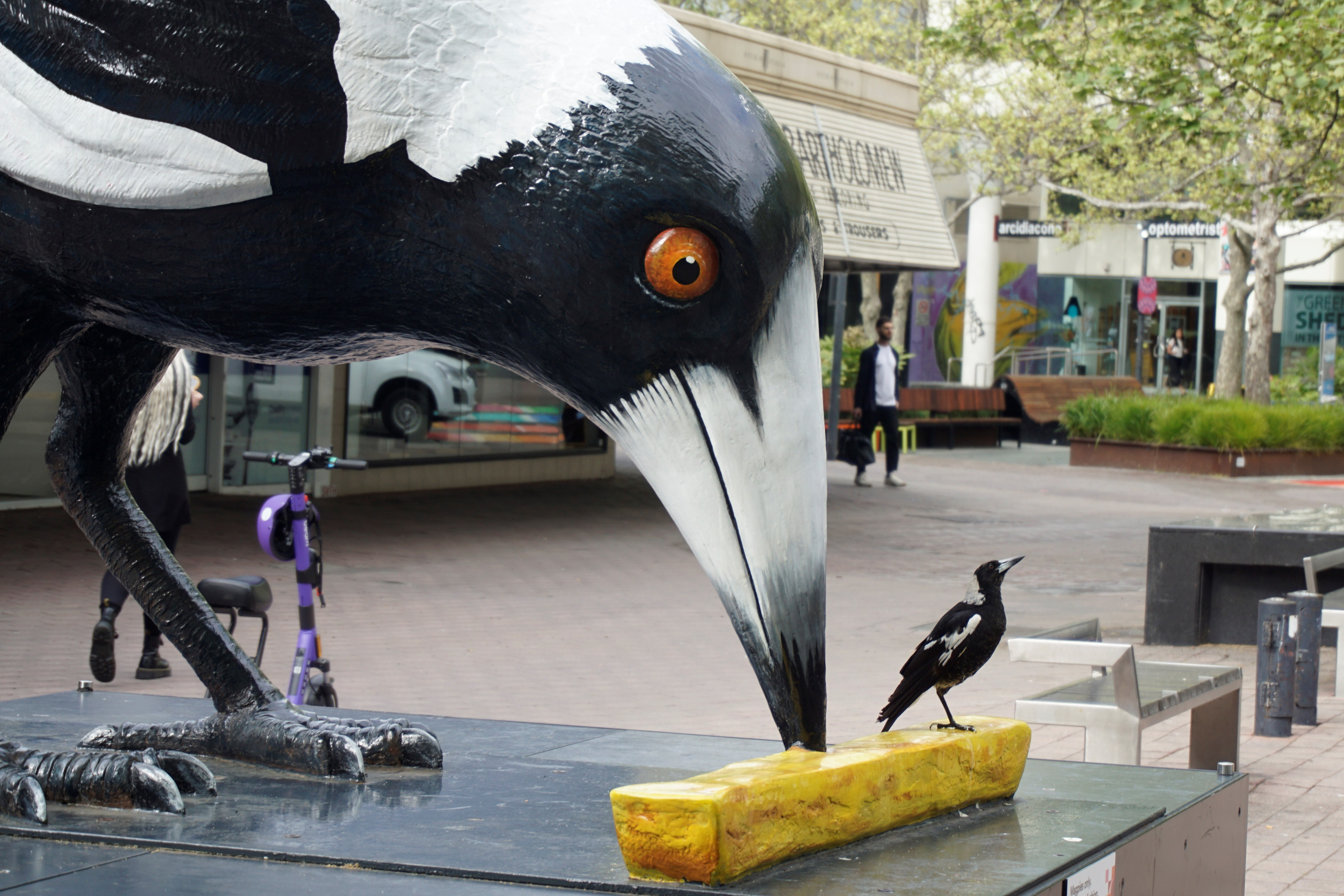
Closeup of the sculpture, with a living magpie settled on the statue's "chip"

Big Swoop was fully repaired and brought back in December 2022. It is now a permanent fixture of Garema Place and considered to be one of Australia's "big things". It was selected for the Royal Australian Mint's and Australia Post's 2023 "Aussie Big Things" coin and stamp set.

In November 2024, the sculpture was moved a short distance to the nearby Petrie Plaza, to allow restoration work to be carried out on Garema Place.
