= George Downer =

South Australian businessman

Alexander George Downer (28 January 1839 – 17 August 1916), usually known as George, or A. G. Downer, was a South Australian businessman and a partner with his brother Sir John Downer in the legal firm G & J Downer.

== History ==
Caricature by David Low

Downer was born in Adelaide, the eldest of four sons of Henry Downer, the others being Henry Edward Downer (22 March 1836 – 4 August 1905), John William Downer (1843–1915), and Harold Field Downer (1847 – 23 May 1887). He was educated at Francis Haire's Academy and while quite young was articled to the firm of Bartley, Bakewell & Stow, whose principals included Randolph Isham Stow. He combined study of law, for which he had a ready talent, with journalism, and was for a time editor of the (Adelaide) Telegraph. He was admitted to the bar in 1868. His brother John had only recently qualified and the two entered into partnership. The firm G & J Downer prospered and was eventually taken over by Frank H. and J. Fred Downer, sons of his brothers Henry Edward and John Downer respectively.

His only attempt at a position in Parliament was in 1870 when he contested the seat of Gumeracha against Ebenezer Ward and Arthur Blyth. He was unsuccessful.

Around 1880 he was appointed by the government to a Pastoral Commission and was in a large part responsible for lengthening the tenure of leases of Crown lands.

Pastoralist Francis John Whitby, a fellow student at Haire's Academy was a lifelong friend. Downer never married. After his death at his (c. 170) South Terrace residence, his Adelaide Hills property "Monalta" (previously known as "Hope Lodge") near the Belair railway station, was subdivided. The mansion eventually became Blackwood District Community Hospital. Sir John, his brother, had predeceased him on 2 August 1915 and his sister Amelia Rivaz had died on 21 July 1916.

== Business activities ==
He was much in demand for his business acumen as well as his knowledge of mercantile law. For around twenty years he was a

- director of China Traders Company
- trustee of Harrold Brothers
- director, Norwich Union Assurance Company
- director, Elder, Smith, & Co. from 1892
- director Bank of Adelaide from around 1894 and Chairman for most of that time

He relinquished these positions in May 1914 as his health deteriorated.

- He invested in a northern pastoral property which was resumed by the Government, then in 1888 a share of Minburra station and an adjoining property, making Melton Station, about 40 km from Yunta.

== See also ==
- Downer family
