= Garema Place =

Public square in Canberra, Australia

- Town Square
- {{{other_names}}}
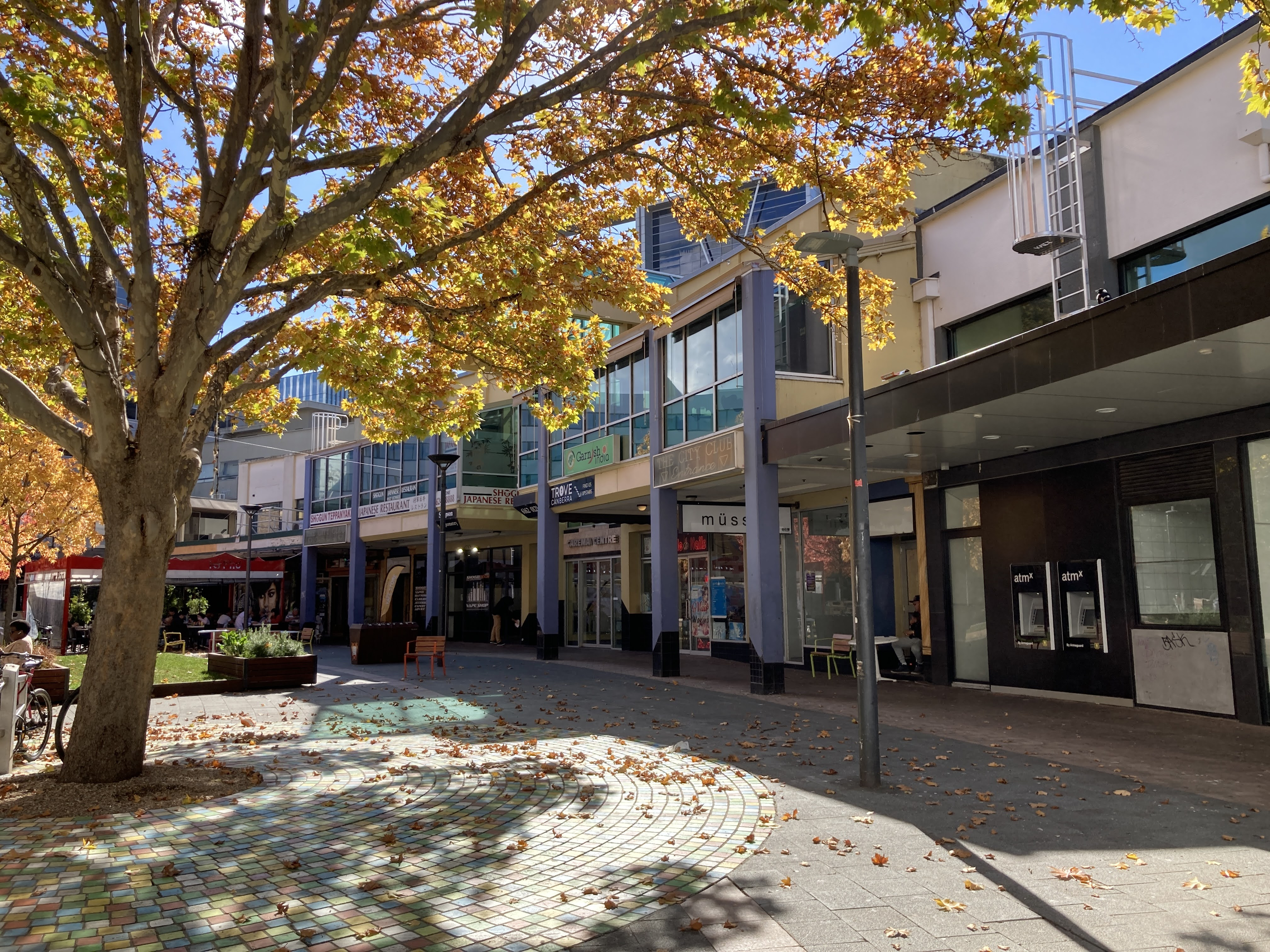
- Area: 116 m^{2} (1,250 sq ft)
- Owner: ACT Government
- Location: Garema Pl, Canberra ACT 2601
- Interactive map of Garema Place
- Coordinates: 35.278338°S 149.132002°E

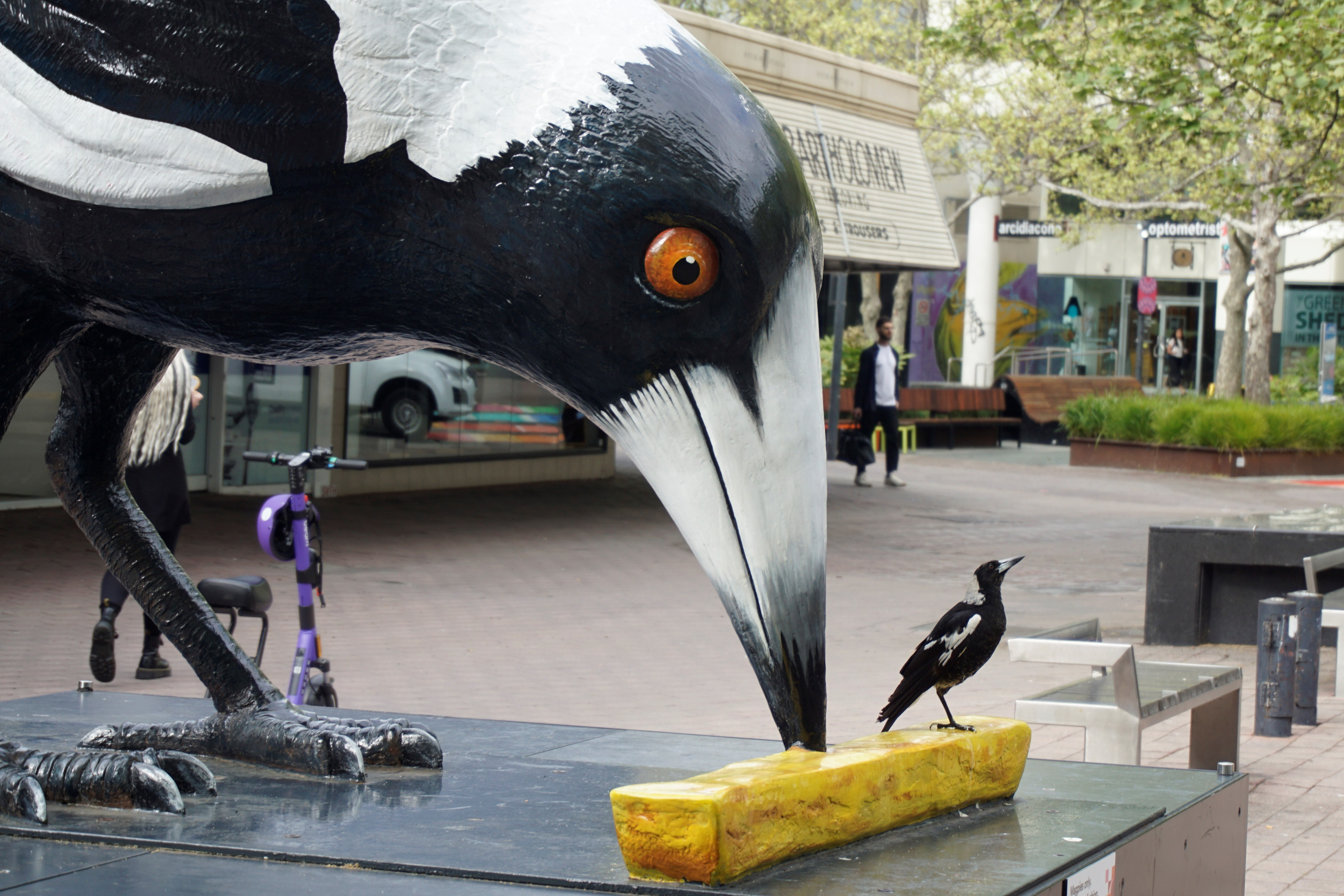
Big Swoop pictured with magpie

Garema Place is a paved outdoor area in Civic, Canberra, Australia, with a number of shops, restaurants and cafes with outdoor dining. As a central point within the CBD, many community events including protests and festivals are held at the location.

Garema Place was Gazetted as a city street in October 1952, when the disused Civic Centre railway station was removed from the site. The station had opened in 1921 as Canberra's second goods rail terminal when the Commonwealth railway line was extended from Kingston, but closed in 1922 when the rail bridge over the Molonglo River was washed away in a flood. The rail corridor ran along what is now City Walk and was preserved until 1950. At that time the National Capital Planning and Development Committee abandoned plans for a Canberra City railway, noting there were disadvantages in having a railway in the centre of a city.

By the mid-1960s, Garema Place had been converted to a pedestrian plaza. Today, Garema Place and nearby City Walk are the location of Canberra's Multicultural Festival held each February and the Celebrate Canberra Festival in March.

In 1963, then-Prime Minister Robert Menzies opened the nearby Monaro Mall (now Canberra Centre), which became the first in Australia to be fully-enclosed and air-conditioned with three floors. Due to the expansive nature of the centre and its association with the Garema Place and nearby City Walk, the Centre has since grown to also cover the land, as if it were a district of its own.

Garema Place is known for its sculptures and artworks by local artists, predominantly "The Cushion and the Wedge", a silver statue of a pillow located in the main area near the chess board. This pillow is colloquially known as the 'Goon Bag', for its resemblance to the Australian icon.

The most recent addition is the "Big Swoop", which commemorates the Australian magpie and its place in Australian culture. One of the more common birds of Australia, including urban Canberra, it is celebrated for its mellifluous carolling and its remarkable memory. During the breeding season the protective male can swoop on a human, occasionally making contact. At other times they are wont to swoop on a dropped chip or other morsel. The statue, designed by local artist Yanni Pounartzis and constructed by sculptor Gustavo Balboa and scenic artist Ari Maack, was installed in March 2022 but was not sufficiently robust to withstand a vandal attack, and had to be removed. It was rebuilt by fibreglass specialist Stuart Roswell to be indistinguishable from the original, but of much sterner stuff, and returned to its original place in December 2022.

Big Swoop was temporarily relocated as major works took place to improve the paving of Garema Place from November 2024 to December 2025, with further works scheduled.

== Gallery ==
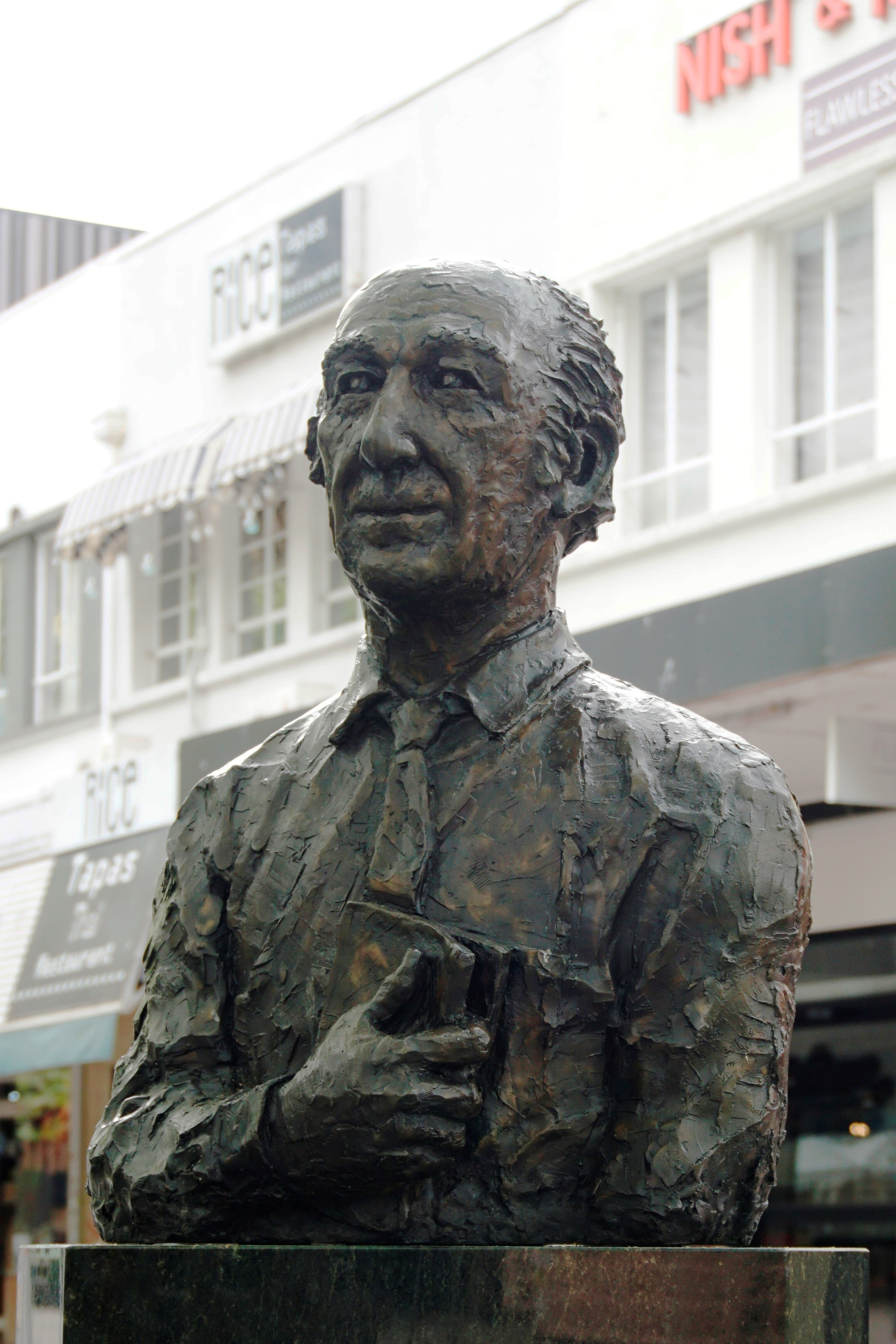
A. D. Hope

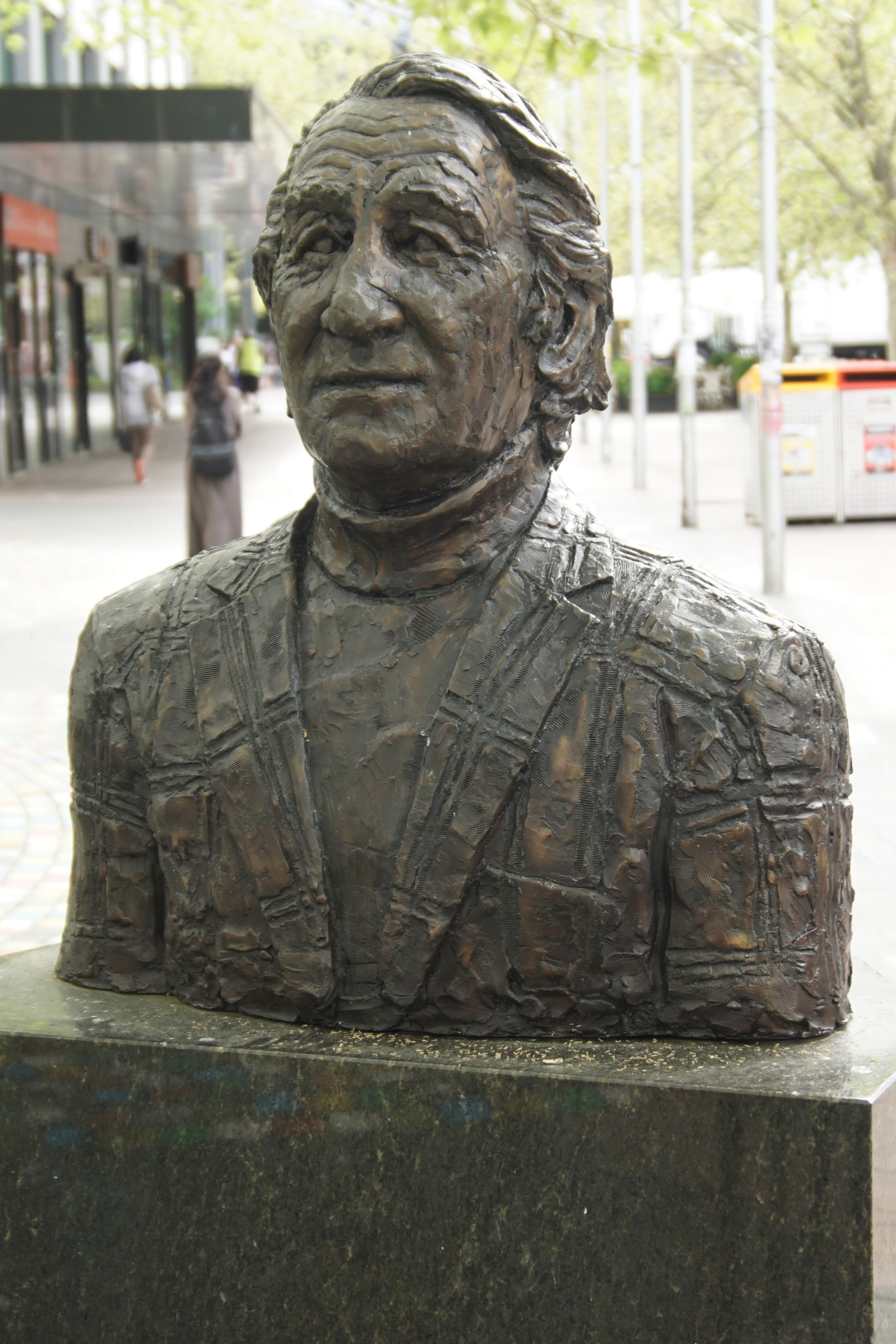
David Campbell

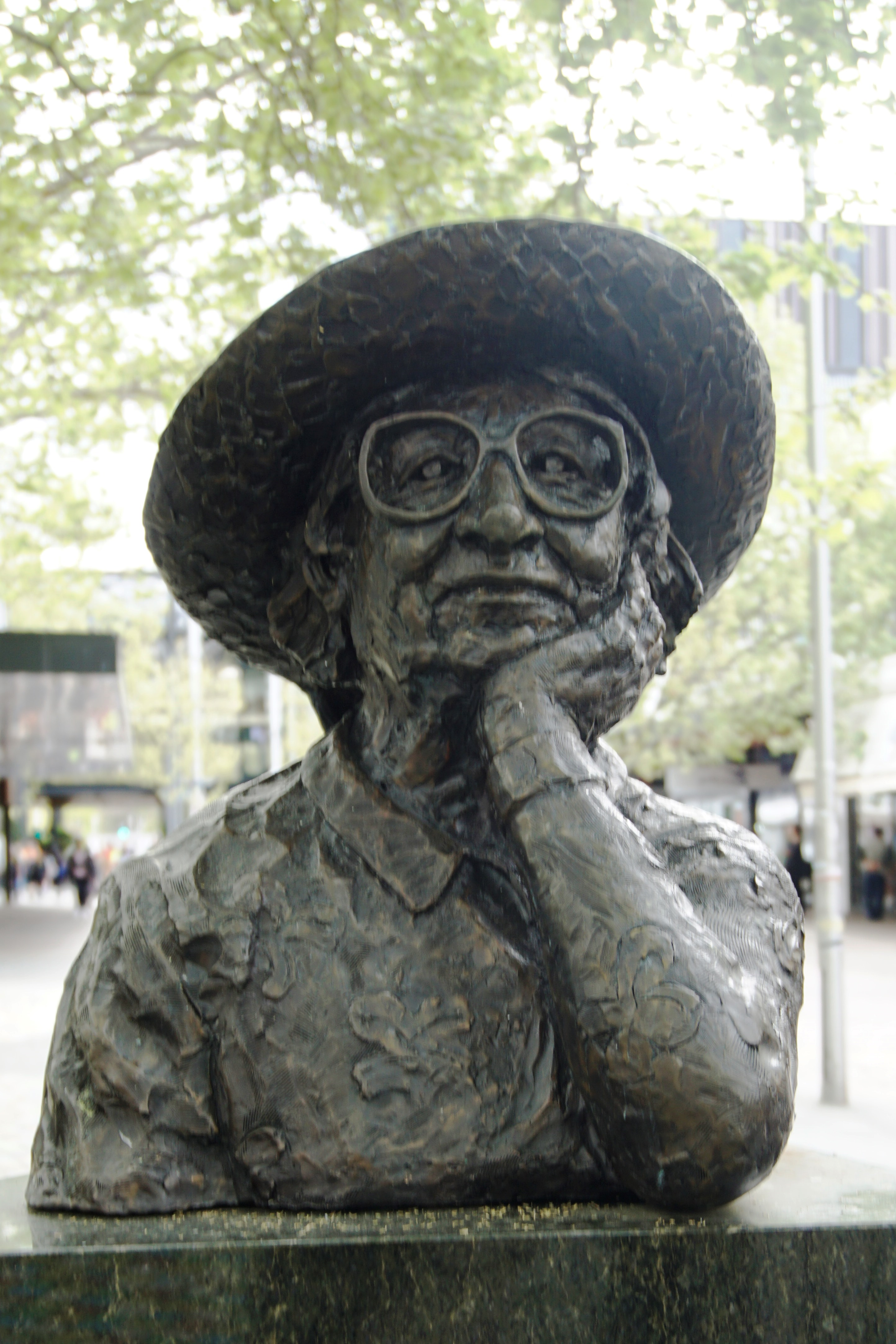
Judith Wright

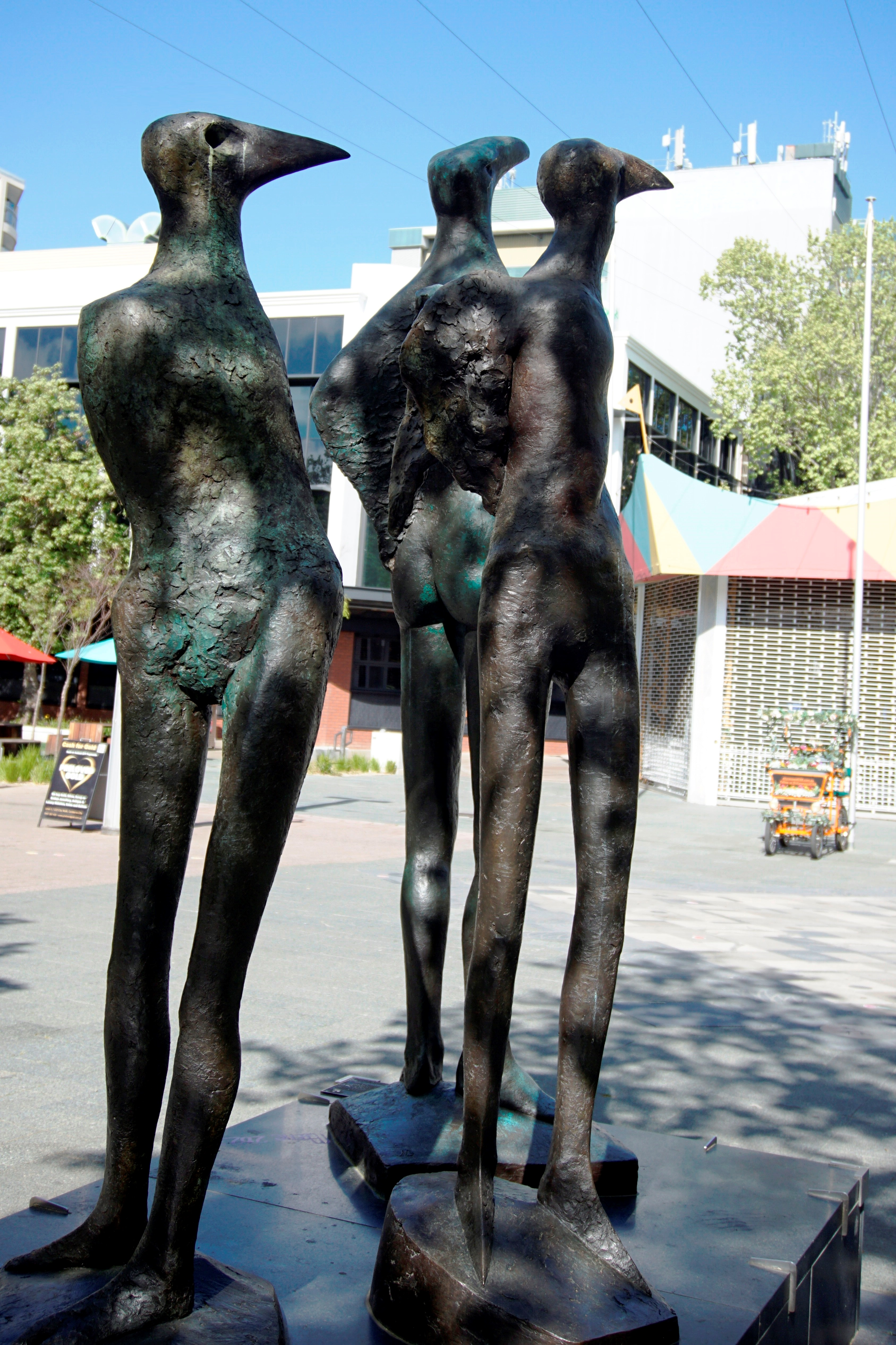
Icarus Series (three figures)

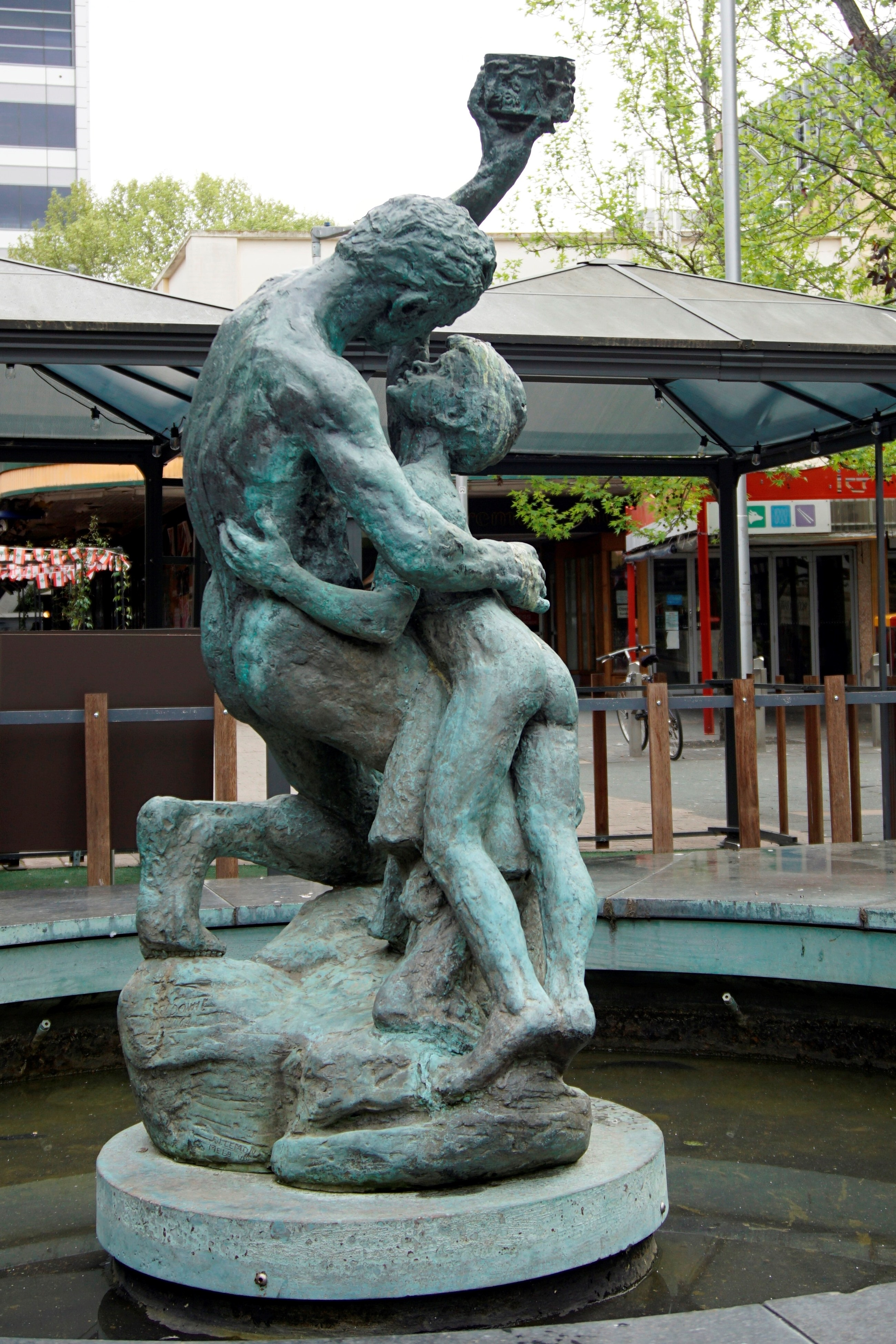
"Father and Son" (John Dowie)

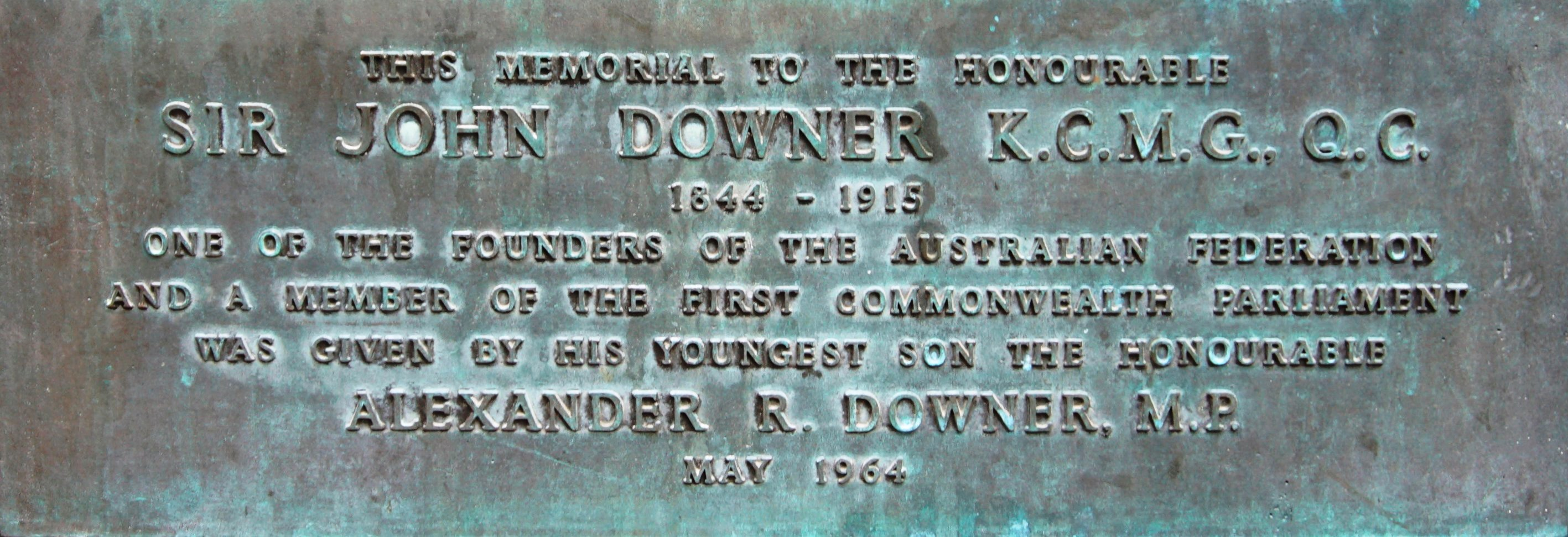
Father and Son plaque
