= 1896 South Australian referendum =

- 25 April 1896
- 1. Are you in favour of the continuance of the present system of education in State schools?; 2. Are you in favour of the introduction of Scriptural instruction in the State Schools during school hours?; 3. Are you in favour of the payment of a capitation grant to denominational schools for secular results?
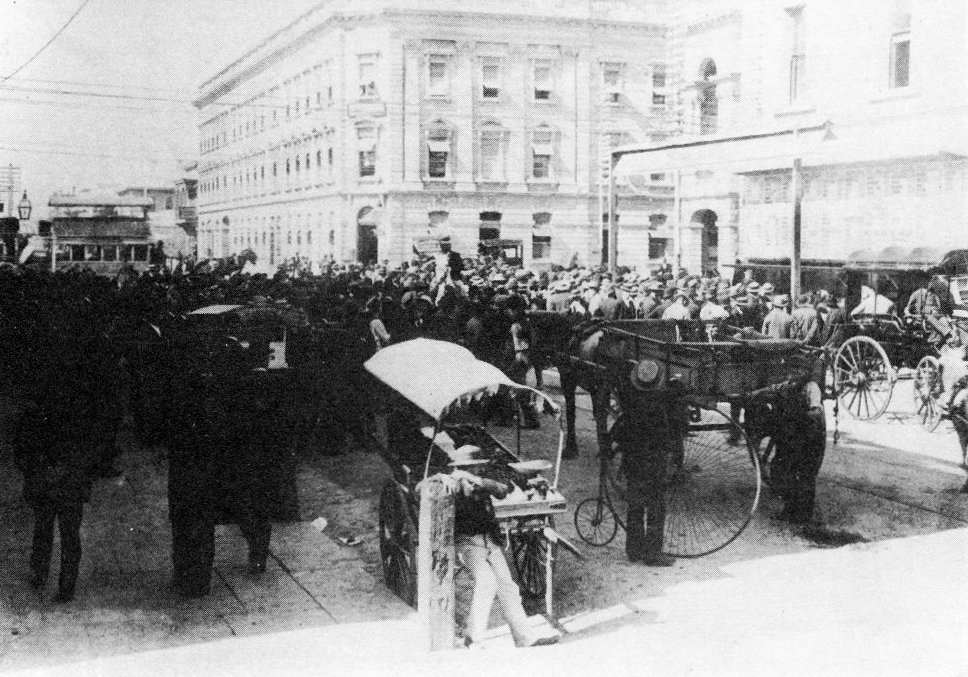
- The 1896 election day crowd on Waymouth Street. The election results can be seen on display to the right. The 1896 referendum was held concurrently with the general election.

A referendum was held in South Australia on 25 April 1896, and dealt with matters relating to secular and religious education. The referendum was held concurrently with the 1896 South Australian election, the first in Australia in which women were eligible to vote and stand for office, and was the first referendum to be held in Australia. The South Australian public affirmed the system of free, secular, state education in place at the time, and rejected scriptural instruction in state schools and a capitation grant for religious schools.

== Background ==
Following the passage of the Free Education Bill in 1891, free and secular education had been provided to South Australian children in state schools. This prompted a number of church groups to campaign for scriptural instruction in state schools. The National Scriptural Education League, led by the Wesleyan pastor Joseph Nicholson, had unsuccessfully attempted to make "scriptural education without dogma" a referendum question at the 1893 election. In 1895, Robert Caldwell, an Anglican Member of the House of Assembly called for a poll to be conducted, asking the opinion of the parents of state school children on the matter. The resolution was amended to extend the poll to all voters, and to include the question of capitation grants for non-state schools. The question was finally proposed as follows:

1. Are you in favour of the continuance of the present system of education in State schools?
2. Are you in favour of the introduction of Scriptural instruction in the State Schools during school hours?
3. Are you in favour of the payment of a capitation grant to denominational schools for secular results?

The three options had initially been proposed as one question, which voters could either support or reject. However, Frederick Holder and Premier Charles Kingston moved that each part be considered separately.

== Results ==
Voters were instructed to place an 'X' next to a proposal to support it, or leave the proposal blank to reject it. All subsequent referendums have been held in a Yes/No format. Of the 137,781 colonists on the electoral roll, 91,348 voted, a turnout of 66.3%. The total informal vote was 12,830 (14%),.

Proposal	Question	For (%)	Against (%)	Result
1	Continuing present system	51,681 (74.4)	17,819 (25.6)	Yes
2	Scriptural instruction	19,280 (35.6)	34,834 (64.4)	No
3	Capitation grant	13,349 (24.1)	42,007 (75.9)	No

== Reaction ==
The Anglican bishop of Adelaide John Harmer, who had been an advocate of both scriptural instruction in schools and the capitation grant, distributed a pastoral letter to his diocese in the wake of the referendum, conceding that the result had decisively shown that these reforms would be unlikely to gain support. The Southern Cross, Adelaide's Catholic newspaper, pointed out that the capitation grant alone, and not scriptural instruction, had been requested by the Catholic Church, and that it was the size of the margin, rather than the result, that was of interest. Christian Weekly, a local Wesleyan paper, also called the decision decisive, but maintained hope for future changes.
