= 1896 South Australian colonial election =

- 25 April – 2 May 1896

All 54 seats in the South Australian House of Assembly (28 seats needed for a majority)
- Registered: 137,747
- Turnout: 66.3% (▼1.3 pp)
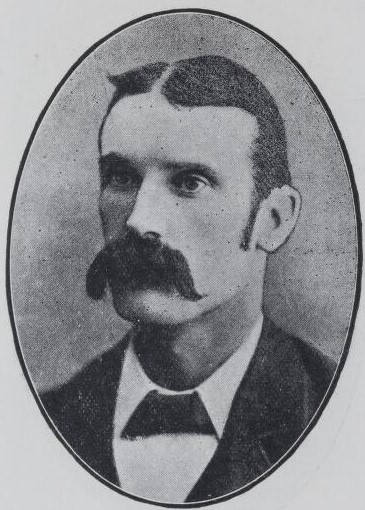
	First party	Second party	Third party
	IND	NDL
Leader	N/A	Unknown	John McPherson
Party	Independent	National Defence	United Labor
Leader since	N/A	N/A	23 February 1892
Leader's seat	N/A	N/A	East Adelaide
Last election	26 seats	18 seats	10 seats
Seats before	22	22	10
Seats won	24	18	12
Seat change	▲2	▼4	▲2
Popular vote	72,676	49,200	39,107
Percentage	45.2%	30.6%	24.3%
Swing	▼13.8 pp	▲8.4 pp	▲5.5 pp
- Results by electoral district for the House of Assembly
Premier before election
Charles Kingston
Elected Premier
Charles Kingston

The 1896 South Australian colonial election was held between 25 April and 2 May 1896 to elect members to the 15th Parliament of South Australia. All 54 seats in the House of Assembly (the lower house, whose members were elected at the 1893 election) were up for re-election. It was the first election in Australia in which women could vote, following the passing of the Constitutional Amendment (Adult Suffrage) Act 1894 two years prior.

The election used non-compulsory plurality block voting, in which electors voted for as many candidates as they wished. Members of the House of Assembly were elected to 27 multi-member districts consisting of two seats each. Suffrage extended to all persons (including Aboriginal people) over 21 years of age, unless they were "attainted or convicted of treason or felony".

== Background ==
The period after the 1893 election saw an increasing competition between the two new political parties – the ULP and the conservative National Defence League (NDL). It also reflected a trend for the conservative members to gravitate to the NDL, and the progressive members to support Kingston, a strong advocate of progressive social policy and reform of the Legislative Council. There was no formal "Liberal" or "Kingston" party, but there was a relatively cohesive Kingston group among both independent members and candidates. The Liberal and Democratic Union would not be formed until the 1906 election.

The election was held concurrently with the first referendum in Australia.

Women's suffrage in Australia took a leap forward – enacted in 1895 and taking effect from this election, South Australia was the first in Australia and only the second in the world after New Zealand to allow women to vote, and the first in the world to allow women to stand for election. However, the first female would not be elected to the Parliament of South Australia until the 1959 election when Jessie Cooper and Joyce Steele were elected for the Liberal and Country League, and the 1965 election for Labor with Molly Byrne.

== Results ==
House of Assembly (BV) – Turnout 66.3% (Non-CV)
Party	Votes			Seats	
Party	Votes	%	Swing (pp)	Seats	Change
Independent	72,676	45.2	–13.8	24	▲2
National Defence	49,200	30.6	+8.4	18	▼4
United Labor	39,107	24.3	+5.5	12	▲2
Total	160,983	100.0	–	54	
Informal votes	1,433	1.6	+0.3		
Turnout	91,267	66.3	–1.3		
Registered voters	137,747	–	–		
Source: ECSA

== See also ==
- Members of the South Australian House of Assembly, 1893–1896
- 1894 South Australian Legislative Council election
