= Members of the South Australian House of Assembly, 1906–1910 =

This is a list of members of the South Australian House of Assembly from 1906 to 1910, as elected at the 1906 state election:

Name	Party	Electorate	Term of office
Peter Allen	FPPU	Wallaroo	1902–1912, 1915–1925
Edward Alfred Anstey ^{[4]}	Labor	Adelaide	1908–1921
William Archibald	Labor	Port Adelaide	1893–1910
William Blacker	LDU	Alexandra	1892–1913
Reginald Blundell ^{[1]}	Labor	Adelaide	1907–1918
Thomas Burgoyne	LDU	Flinders	1884–1915
Hon Richard Butler	FPPU	Barossa	1890–1924
Donald Campbell	Labor	Victoria and Albert	1906–1912
Henry Chesson	Labor	Port Adelaide	1905–1918
Hon Sir Jenkin Coles	ANL	Wooroora	1875–1878, 1881–1911
Frederick Coneybeer	Labor	Torrens	1893–1921, 1924–1930
Ephraim Coombe	LDU	Barossa	1901–1912, 1915–1917
Thomas Crush ^{[5]}	Labor	Northern Territory	1908–1911
William Patrick Cummins ^{[2]}	LDU	Stanley	1896–1907
George Dankel	Labor	Torrens	1905–1912
Bill Denny	Labor	Adelaide	1900–1905, 1906–1933
Kossuth William Duncan ^{[2]}	FPPU	Stanley	1907–1910
Clarence Goode	Labor	Stanley	1905–1918
Percy Heggaton		Alexandra	1906–1915, 1923–1938
Hermann Homburg	ANL	Murray	1906–1915, 1927–1930
Arthur Hugh Inkster ^{[3]}	LDU	Flinders	1905–1907
Harry Jackson	Labor	Stanley	1906–1918
David James	ANL	Wooroora	1902–1918
William Jamieson	LDU	Murray	1901–1902, 1905–1912
Ivor MacGillivray	Labor	Port Adelaide	1893–1918
Alexander McDonald	ANL	Alexandra	1887–1915
William Miller	FPPU	Burra Burra	1902–1918
Samuel James Mitchell ^{[8]}	LDU	Northern Territory	1901–1910
John Newland	Labor	Burra Burra	1906–1912
Hon Laurence O'Loughlin	FPPU	Burra Burra	1890–1918
Friedrich Wilhelm Paech ^{[6]}	ANL	Wooroora	1899–1908
Archibald Peake	LDU	Victoria and Albert	1897–1915, 1915–1920
Friedrich Pflaum	ANL	Murray	1902–1915
William David Ponder	Labor	Adelaide	1905–1921
Thomas Price ^{[7]}	Labor	Torrens	1893–1909
George Ritchie	FPPU	Alexandra	1902–1922
Ernest Roberts ^{[4]}	Labor	Adelaide	1896–1902, 1905–1908
Samuel Rudall	LDU	Barossa	1906–1915
Thomas Ryan ^{[7]}	Labor	Torrens	1909–1912, 1915–1917
James Zimri Sellar ^{[1]}	Labor	Adelaide	1905–1906
William Senior	Labor	Victoria and Albert	1904–1912
Thomas Hyland Smeaton	Labor	Torrens	1905–1921
Hon Vaiben Louis Solomon ^{[5]}	ANL	Northern Territory	1890–1901, 1905–1908
John Travers	Labor	Flinders	1906–1910, 1912–1918
Crawford Vaughan	Labor	Torrens	1905–1918
John Verran	Labor	Wallaroo	1901–1918
Edgar Hampton Warren ^{[3]}	FPPU	Flinders	1907–1910
Alfred Edwin Winter	Labor	Wallaroo	1905–1912
Frederick William Young ^{[6]}	FPPU	Wooroora	1902–1905, 1909–1915

^{1} Adelaide MHA James Zimri Sellar died on 20 December 1906. Reginald Blundell won the resulting by-election on 26 January 1907.
^{2} Stanley MHA William Patrick Cummins died on 9 March 1907. Kossuth William Duncan won the resulting by-election on 13 April.
^{3} Flinders MHA Arthur Hugh Inkster died on 29 March 1907. Edgar Hampton Warren won the resulting by-election on 18 May.
^{4} Adelaide MHA Ernest Roberts resigned on 15 May 1908. Edward Alfred Anstey won the resulting by-election on 20 June.
^{5} Northern Territory MHA Vaiben Louis Solomon died on 20 October 1908. Thomas Crush won the resulting by-election on 5 December.
^{6} Wooroora MHA Friedrich Wilhelm Paech died on 29 December 1908. Frederick William Young won the resulting by-election on 13 February 1909.
^{7} Torrens MHA Thomas Price died on 31 May 1909. Thomas Ryan won the resulting by-election on 3 July.
^{8} Northern Territory MHA Samuel James Mitchell resigned on 18 January 1910. No by-election was held before the 1910 election.
