= Members of the South Australian House of Assembly, 1905–1906 =

This is a list of members of the South Australian House of Assembly from 1905 to 1906, as elected at the 1905 state election:

| Name | Party | Electorate | Term of office |
|---|---|---|---|
| Peter Allen | FPPU | Wallaroo | 1902–1912, 1915–1925 |
| William Archibald | Labor | Port Adelaide | 1893–1910 |
| William Blacker | | Alexandra | 1892–1913 |
| Thomas Burgoyne | FPPU | Flinders | 1884–1915 |
| Richard Butler | FPPU | Barossa | 1890–1924 |
| Hon Alfred Catt | FPPU | Stanley | 1881–1906 |
| Henry Chesson | Labor | Port Adelaide | 1905–1918 |
| Lewis Cohen | ANL | Adelaide | 1887–1893, 1902–1906 |
| Hon Sir Jenkin Coles | ANL | Wooroora | 1875–1878, 1881–1911 |
| Frederick Coneybeer | Labor | Torrens | 1893–1921, 1924–1930 |
| Ephraim Coombe | | Barossa | 1901–1912, 1915–1917 |
| William Patrick Cummins | ANL | Stanley | 1896–1907 |
| George Dankel | Labor | Torrens | 1905–1912 |
| Walter Hughes Duncan ^{[1]} | ANL | Murray | 1896–1906 |
| Richard Foster | FPPU | Flinders | 1893–1906 |
| William Gilbert | ANL | Barossa | 1881–1906 |
| Clarence Goode | Labor | Stanley | 1905–1918 |
| Hermann Homburg ^{[1]} | ANL | Murray | 1906–1915, 1927–1930 |
| Arthur Hugh Inkster | | Flinders | 1905–1907 |
| David James | ANL | Wooroora | 1902–1918 |
| William Jamieson | ANL | Murray | 1901–1902, 1905–1912 |
| John Livingston | FPPU | Victoria and Albert | 1899–1906 |
| Ivor MacGillivray | Labor | Port Adelaide | 1893–1918 |
| Alexander McDonald | ANL | Alexandra | 1887–1915 |
| William Miller | FPPU | Burra Burra | 1902–1918 |
| Samuel James Mitchell | | Northern Territory | 1901–1910 |
| Hon Laurence O'Loughlin | FPPU | Burra Burra | 1890–1918 |
| Friedrich Wilhelm Paech | ANL | Wooroora | 1899–1908 |
| Archibald Peake | | Victoria and Albert | 1897–1915, 1915–1920 |
| Friedrich Pflaum | ANL | Murray | 1902–1915 |
| William David Ponder | Labor | Adelaide | 1905–1921 |
| Thomas Price | Labor | Torrens | 1893–1909 |
| George Ritchie | FPPU | Alexandra | 1902–1922 |
| Ernest Roberts | Labor | Adelaide | 1896–1902, 1905–1908 |
| Hon Ben Rounsevell | | Burra Burra | 1875–1893, 1899–1906 |
| James Zimri Sellar | Labor | Adelaide | 1905–1906 |
| William Senior | Labor | Victoria and Albert | 1904–1912 |
| Thomas Hyland Smeaton | Labor | Torrens | 1905–1921 |
| Hon Vaiben Louis Solomon | | Northern Territory | 1890–1901, 1905–1908 |
| Charles Tucker | ANL | Alexandra | 1899–1906 |
| Crawford Vaughan | Labor | Torrens | 1905–1918 |
| John Verran | Labor | Wallaroo | 1901–1918 |
| Alfred Edwin Winter | Labor | Wallaroo | 1905–1912 |

^{1} Murray MHA Walter Hughes Duncan died on 12 May 1906. Hermann Homburg won the resulting by-election on 23 June.
