= Members of the South Australian House of Assembly, 1910–1912 =

This is a list of members of the South Australian House of Assembly from 1910 to 1912, as elected at the 1910 state election:

| Name | Party | Electorate | Term of office |
|---|---|---|---|
| Peter Allen | FPPU/LU ^{[1]} | Wallaroo | 1902–1912, 1915–1925 |
| Edward Alfred Anstey | Labor | Adelaide | 1908–1921 |
| William Blacker | ANL/LU ^{[1]} | Alexandra | 1892–1913 |
| Reginald Blundell | Labor | Adelaide | 1907–1918 |
| J. A. V. Brown ^{[3]} | FPPU/LU ^{[1]} | Northern Territory | 1910–1911 |
| Thomas Burgoyne | LDU/LU ^{[1]} | Flinders | 1884–1915 |
| Hon Richard Butler | FPPU/LU ^{[1]} | Barossa | 1890–1924 |
| Donald Campbell | Labor | Victoria and Albert | 1906–1912 |
| Henry Chesson | Labor | Port Adelaide | 1905–1918 |
| William Cole | Labor | Stanley | 1910–1918 |
| Hon Sir Jenkin Coles ^{[4]} | ANL/LU ^{[4]} | Wooroora | 1875–1878, 1881–1911 |
| Ephraim Coombe | LDU/Independent ^{[2]} | Barossa | 1901–1912, 1915–1917 |
| Frederick Coneybeer | Labor | Torrens | 1893–1921, 1924–1930 |
| Thomas Crush ^{[3]} | Labor | Northern Territory | 1908–1911 |
| George Dankel | Labor | Torrens | 1905–1912 |
| Bill Denny | Labor | Adelaide | 1900–1905, 1906–1933 |
| Clarence Goode | Labor | Stanley | 1905–1918 |
| Thompson Green | Labor | Port Adelaide | 1910–1918 |
| Percy Heggaton | ANL/LU ^{[1]} | Alexandra | 1906–1915, 1923–1938 |
| Hon Hermann Homburg | ANL/LU ^{[1]} | Murray | 1906–1915, 1927–1930 |
| Harry Jackson | Labor | Stanley | 1906–1918 |
| David James | ANL/LU ^{[1]} | Wooroora | 1902–1918 |
| William Jamieson | ANL/LU ^{[1]} | Murray | 1901–1902, 1905–1912 |
| Ivor MacGillivray | Labor | Port Adelaide | 1893–1918 |
| Alexander McDonald | ANL/LU ^{[1]} | Alexandra | 1887–1915 |
| William Miller | FPPU/LU ^{[1]} | Burra Burra | 1902–1918 |
| James Moseley | FPPU/LU ^{[1]} | Flinders | 1910–1933 |
| John Newland | Labor | Burra Burra | 1906–1912 |
| Hon James O'Loghlin | Labor | Flinders | 1910–1912 |
| Hon Laurence O'Loughlin | LDU/LU ^{[1]} | Burra Burra | 1890–1918 |
| Hon Archibald Peake | LDU/LU ^{[1]} | Victoria and Albert | 1897–1915, 1915–1920 |
| Friedrich Pflaum | ANL/LU ^{[1]} | Murray | 1902–1915 |
| William David Ponder | Labor | Adelaide | 1905–1921 |
| George Ritchie | ANL/LU ^{[1]} | Alexandra | 1902–1922 |
| Samuel Rudall | ANL/LU ^{[1]} | Barossa | 1906–1915 |
| Thomas Ryan | Labor | Torrens | 1909–1912, 1915–1917 |
| William Senior | Labor | Victoria and Albert | 1904–1912 |
| Thomas Hyland Smeaton | Labor | Torrens | 1905–1921 |
| Crawford Vaughan | Labor | Torrens | 1905–1918 |
| John Verran | Labor | Wallaroo | 1901–1918 |
| Alfred Edwin Winter | Labor | Wallaroo | 1905–1912 |
| Frederick William Young | FPPU/LU ^{[1]} | Wooroora | 1902–1905, 1909–1915 |

^{1} The three anti-Labor parties, the Liberal and Democratic Union, the Australasian National League and the Farmers and Producers Political Union, formally merged to form the Liberal Union in late 1910. They had been in merger discussions for some time, and had jointly endorsed a united Liberal ticket for all but three House of Assembly seats at the 1910 election.
^{2} Barossa MHA Ephraim Coombe, who had been elected for the Liberal and Democratic Union, refused to sign the merged Liberal Union pledge and never sat with the new party. He served out his term as an independent, although some sources refer to him as unsuccessfully having tried to found a rival liberal party during this term.
^{3} The Northern Territory was separated from South Australia and transferred to the Commonwealth on 1 January 1911. The two members for the Northern Territory ceased to be members of the House of Assembly as of 5 January.
^{4} Wooroora MHA Sir Jenkin Coles had his seat vacated for absence without leave on 17 November 1911. No by-election was held before the 1912 election.
