= Members of the South Australian Legislative Council, 1910–1912 =

This is a list of members of the South Australian Legislative Council from 1910 to 1912

It was the third Legislative Council to be fully determined by provisions of the (State) Constitution Act 779 of 1901, which provided for, inter alia, a reduction in the number of seats from 24 to 18, realignment of District borders to encompass Assembly electorates, six-year terms (one half of the Council retiring every three years), and elections held jointly with the House of Assembly.

The election of 1910 was called after a Constitutional crisis when Thomas Price died, and John Verran refused to negotiate a coalition government like the Price-Peake administration.

Name	District	Party	Time in office
Arthur Richman Addison	Northern	LDU/LU ^{[1]}	1888–1915
John George Bice	Northern	LDU/LU ^{[1]}	1894–1923
Theodore Bruce ^{[2]}	Central	FPPU/LU ^{[1]}	1909–1911
John Cowan	Southern	ANL/LU ^{[1]}	1910–1944
Sir John Downer	Southern	ANL/LU ^{[1]}	1905–1915
John Duncan	North-Eastern	ANL/LU ^{[1]}	1891–1896, 1900–1913
James Howe	Northern	FPPU/LU ^{[1]}	1897–1918
Andrew Kirkpatrick	Central	Labor	1891–1897, 1900–1909, 1918–1928
Ern Klauer	Central	Labor	1910–1915
John Lewis	Northern	ANL/LU ^{[1]}	1898–1923
Edward Lucas	North-Eastern	ANL/LU ^{[1]}	1900–1918
Charles Morris ^{[2]}	Central	LU	1911–1912
Beaumont Arnold Moulden	Central	ANL/LU ^{[1]}	1903–1912
Thomas Pascoe	North-Eastern	ANL/LU ^{[1]}	1900–1933
Sir Lancelot Stirling	Southern	ANL/LU ^{[1]}	1891–1932
Alfred William Styles	Central	Labor	1910–1918
Alfred von Doussa	Southern	ANL/LU ^{[1]}	1901–1921
Frederick Samuel Wallis	Central	Labor	1907–1921
John Warren	North-Eastern	ANL/LU ^{[1]}	1888–1912
James Phillips Wilson	Central	Labor	1906–1918

^{1} The three anti-Labor parties, the Liberal and Democratic Union, the Australasian National League and the Farmers and Producers Political Union, formally merged to form the Liberal Union in late 1910. They had been in merger discussions for some time, and had jointly endorsed a united Liberal ticket for the Legislative Council at the 1910 election.
^{2} Liberal MLC Theodore Bruce died on 1 July 1911. Liberal candidate Charles Morris won the resulting by-election on 5 August.
