= Members of the South Australian Legislative Council, 1908–1910 =

This is a list of members of the South Australian Legislative Council from 1908 to 1910.

It was the third Legislative Council to be fully determined by provisions of the (State) Constitution Act 779 of 1901, which provided for, inter alia, a reduction in the number of seats from 24 to 18, realignment of District borders to encompass Assembly electorates, six-year terms (one half of the Council retiring every three years), and elections held jointly with the House of Assembly.

This parliament's scheduled term of 1908 to 1911 was cut short by a Constitutional crisis when Thomas Price died, and John Verran refused to negotiate a coalition government like the Price-Peake administration.

Name	District	Party	Term expires	Time in office	Notes
Arthur Richman Addison	Northern			1888–1915	
John George Bice	Northern			1894–1923	
George Brookman	Central			1901–1910	
Theodore Bruce	Central			1909–1911	elected May 1909
Sir John William Downer	Southern	ANL		1905–1912	
John Duncan	North-Eastern	ANL		1891–1896; 1900–1913	
James Henderson Howe	Northern			1897–1918	
Andrew Kirkpatrick	Central	Labor		1891–1897; 1900–1909; 1918–1928	resigned Mar. 1909
John Lewis	Northern			1898–1923	
Edward Lucas	North-Eastern	ANL		1900–1918	
Beaumont Arnold Moulden	Central	ANL		1903–1912	
Hugo Carl Emil Muecke	Central			1903–1910	
Thomas Pascoe	North-Eastern			1900–1933	
George Riddoch	Southern	ANL		1901–1910	
John Lancelot Stirling	Southern			1891–1932	
Alfred von Doussa	Southern			1901–1921	
Frederick Samuel Wallis	Central	Labor		1907–1912	
John Warren	North-Eastern			1888–1912	
James Phillips Wilson	Central	Labor		1906–1918	
