= Treasurer of South Australia =

South Australian cabinet minister

- South Australian Coat of Arms

- Flag of South Australia

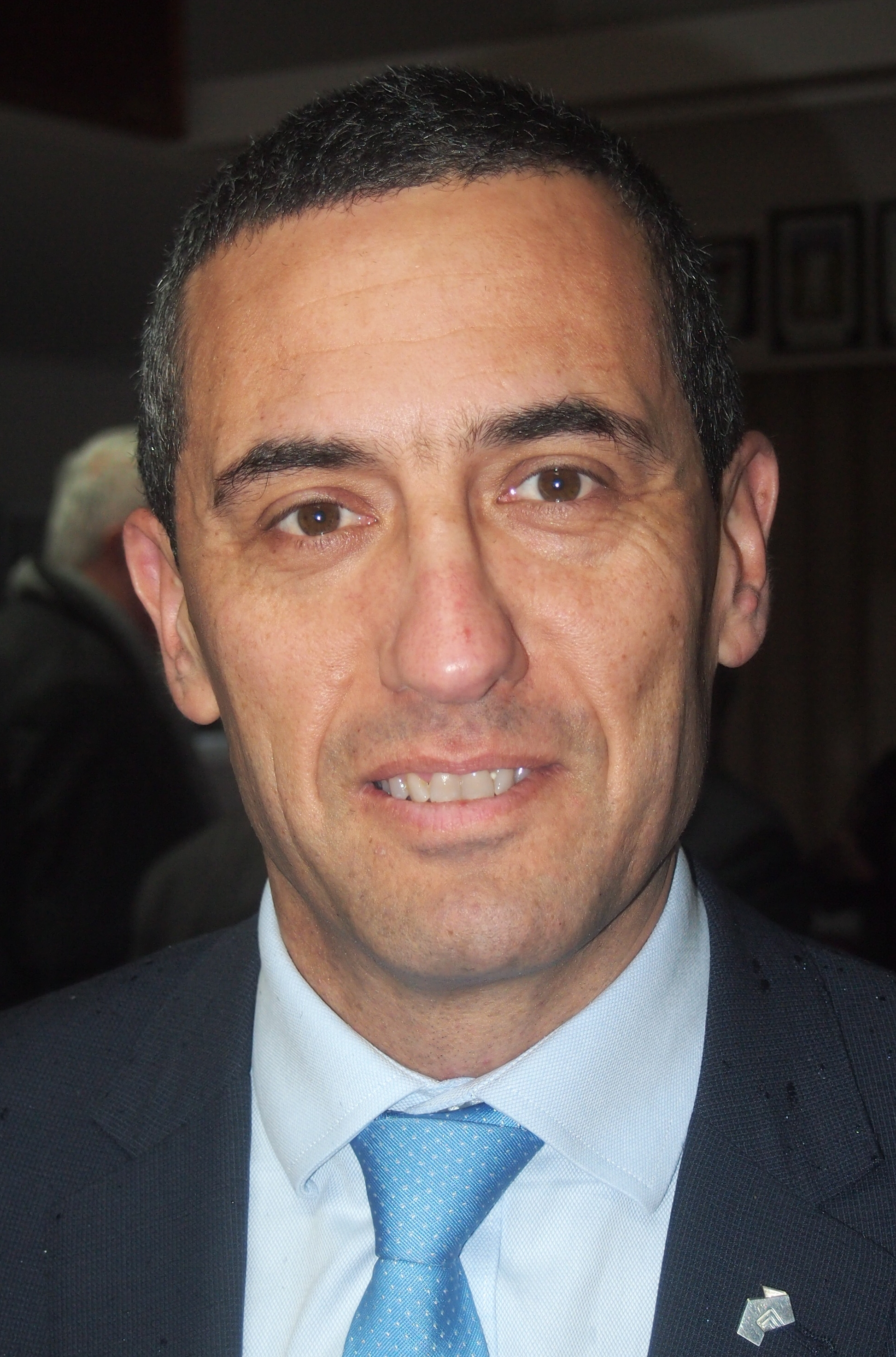
- Incumbent; Tom Koutsantonis since 19 Sep 2025
- Department of Treasury and Finance
- Style: The Honourable
- Member of: Parliament; Cabinet; Executive Council
- Reports to: Premier of South Australia
- Seat: State Administration Centre, 200 Victoria Square, Adelaide
- Nominator: Premier of South Australia
- Appointer: Governor of South Australia on the advice of the premier
- Term length: At the governor's pleasure
- Formation: 24 October 1856
- First holder: Robert Torrens

The Treasurer of South Australia is the minister of the Government of South Australia charged with overseeing government revenue collection, expenditure and economic policy as the head of the Department of Treasury and Finance. The current treasurer is Tom Koutsantonis, who was selected by Premier Peter Malinauskas in September 2025 during a reshuffle of the ministry.

== Responsibilities and duties ==
The treasurer is responsible for the financial management of the state of South Australia.

=== Renewal SA ===
Since 28 July 2020 and as of 2021 the Urban Renewal Authority, trading as Renewal SA, has been within the treasurer's portfolio. Renewal SA is responsible for undertaking, supporting and promoting urban development and urban renewal that aligns to the government's strategic plan, in particular the 30-Year Plan for Greater Adelaide (2017).

== List of treasurers ==
The following is a list of treasurers of South Australia, from 1839 to present. As self-government and the Parliament of South Australia began in 1857, no official parliament record was kept and no definite evidence of the official holder of the office could be found prior to that year.

| Order | Minister | Political party | Premier | Term of office | | |
| Order | Minister | Political party | Premier | Took office | Left office | Tenure |
Pre-self-government (1836–1856)
| — | Osmond Gilles | — | | 28 December 1836 | 1 October 1839 | 2 years, 277 days |
| — | John Alexander Jackson | — | | 1 October 1839 | 16 October 1841 | 2 years, 15 days |
| — | Robert Gouger | — | | 16 October 1841 | July 1844 | |
| — | James William MacDonald | — | | July 1844 | 2 March 1846 | |
| — | Charles Sturt | — | | 2 March 1846 | 28 April 1847 | 1 year, 57 days |
| (4) | Boyle Travers Finniss | — | | 28 April 1847 | May 1849 | |
| — | William Maturin (acting) | — | | May 1849 | 1849 | |
| (4) | Boyle Travers Finniss | — | | 1849 | 3 January 1852 | |
| 1 | Robert Richard Torrens | Independent | Finniss | 3 January 1852 | 21 August 1857 | 5 years, 230 days |
Colonial government (1856–1900)
| 2 | John Hart | Independent | Baker | 21 August 1857 | 1 September 1857 | 11 days |
| 3 | John Bristow Hughes | Independent | Torrens | 1 September 1857 | 30 September 1857 | 29 days |
| (2) | John Hart | Independent | Hanson | 30 September 1857 | 12 June 1858 | 255 days |
| 4 | Boyle Travers Finniss | Independent | Hanson | 12 June 1858 | 9 May 1860 | 1 year, 332 days |
| 5 | Thomas Reynolds | Independent | Reynolds | 9 May 1860 | 8 October 1861 | 1 year, 152 days |
| 6 | Arthur Blyth | Independent | Waterhouse | 8 October 1861 | 17 October 1861 | 9 days |
| (5) | Thomas Reynolds | Independent | Waterhouse | 17 October 1861 | 19 February 1862 | 125 days |
| (6) | Arthur Blyth | Independent | Waterhouse | 19 February 1862 | 4 July 1863 | 1 year, 135 days |
| 7 | Lavington Glyde | Independent | Dutton | 4 July 1863 | 15 July 1863 | 11 days |
| (2) | John Hart | Independent | Ayers | 15 July 1863 | 22 March 1865 | 1 year, 250 days |
| (2) | John Hart | Independent | Blyth | 15 July 1863 | 22 March 1865 | 1 year, 250 days |
| (5) | Thomas Reynolds | Independent | Dutton | 22 March 1865 | 20 September 1865 | 182 days |
| (6) | Arthur Blyth | Independent | Ayers | 20 September 1865 | 23 October 1865 | 33 days |
| 8 | Walter Duffield | Independent | Hart | 23 October 1865 | 3 May 1867 | 1 year, 192 days |
| 8 | Walter Duffield | Independent | Boucaut | 23 October 1865 | 3 May 1867 | 1 year, 192 days |
| (5) | Thomas Reynolds | Independent | Ayers | 3 May 1867 | 24 September 1868 | 1 year, 144 days |
| 9 | Neville Blyth | Independent | Hart | 24 September 1868 | 13 October 1868 | 19 days |
| (5) | Thomas Reynolds | Independent | Ayers | 13 October 1868 | 3 November 1868 | 21 days |
| 10 | Henry Kent Hughes | Independent | Strangways | 3 November 1868 | 12 May 1870 | 1 year, 190 days |
| 11 | Edward Hamilton | Independent | Strangways | 12 May 1870 | 30 May 1870 | 18 days |
| (2) | John Hart | Independent | Hart | 30 May 1870 | 10 November 1871 | 1 year, 164 days |
| (6) | Arthur Blyth | Independent | Blyth | 10 November 1871 | 22 January 1872 | 73 days |
| (10) | Henry Kent Hughes | Independent | Ayers | 22 January 1872 | 4 March 1872 | 42 days |
| 12 | John Henry Barrow | Independent | Ayers | 4 March 1872 | 22 July 1873 | 1 year, 140 days |
| 13 | George Charles Hawker | Independent | Blyth | 25 May 1875 | 3 June 1875 | 9 days |
| 14 | John Colton | Independent | Boucaut | 3 June 1875 | 25 March 1876 | 296 days |
| (6) | Arthur Blyth | Independent | Boucaut | 25 March 1876 | 6 June 1876 | 73 days |
| 15 | Robert Dalrymple Ross | Independent | Colton | 6 June 1876 | 26 October 1877 | 1 year, 142 days |
| 16 | James Boucaut | Independent | Boucaut | 26 October 1877 | 27 September 1878 | 336 days |
| 17 | Charles Mann | Independent | Morgan | 27 September 1878 | 10 March 1881 | 2 years, 164 days |
| 18 | George Fowler | Independent | Morgan | 10 March 1881 | 10 May 1881 | 61 days |
| 19 | Ben Rounsevell | Independent | Morgan | 10 May 1881 | 24 June 1881 | 45 days |
| (7) | Lavington Glyde | Independent | Bray | 24 June 1881 | 23 April 1884 | 2 years, 304 days |
| 20 | John Cox Bray | Independent | Bray | 23 April 1884 | 16 June 1884 | 54 days |
| (19) | Ben Rounsevell | Independent | Colton | 16 June 1884 | 16 June 1885 | 1 year, 0 days |
| 21 | Simpson Newland | Independent | Downer | 16 June 1885 | 8 June 1886 | 357 days |
| (20) | John Cox Bray | Independent | Downer | 8 June 1886 | 11 June 1887 | 1 year, 3 days |
| 22 | Thomas Playford | Independent | Playford | 11 June 1887 | 27 June 1889 | 2 years, 16 days |
| 23 | Frederick Holder | Independent | Cockburn | 27 June 1889 | 19 August 1890 | 1 year, 53 days |
| (22) | Thomas Playford | Independent | Playford | 19 August 1890 | 6 January 1892 | 1 year, 140 days |
| (19) | Ben Rounsevell | Independent | Playford | 6 January 1892 | 21 June 1892 | 167 days |
| (23) | Frederick Holder | Independent | Holder | 21 June 1892 | 15 October 1892 | 116 days |
| (19) | Ben Rounsevell | Independent | Downer | 15 October 1892 | 12 May 1893 | 209 days |
| 24 | John Downer | National Defence | Downer | 12 May 1893 | 16 June 1893 | 35 days |
| (22) | Thomas Playford | Independent | Kingston | 16 June 1893 | 17 April 1894 | 305 days |
| (23) | Frederick Holder | Independent | Kingston | 17 April 1894 | 1 December 1899 | 5 years, 228 days |
| 25 | Vaiben Louis Solomon | Independent | Solomon | 1 December 1899 | 8 December 1899 | 7 days |
| (23) | Frederick Holder | Independent | Holder | 8 December 1899 | 15 May 1901 | 1 year, 158 days |
State government (1901–present)
| 26 | Richard Butler | Farmers and Producers | Jenkins | 15 May 1901 | 1 March 1905 | 3 years, 290 days |
| 27 | Archibald Peake | Liberal and Democratic | Price | 26 July 1906 | 22 December 1909 | 4 years, 149 days |
| 27 | Archibald Peake | Liberal and Democratic | Peake | 26 July 1906 | 22 December 1909 | 4 years, 149 days |
| (26) | Richard Butler | Farmers and Producers | Peake | 22 December 1909 | 3 June 1910 | 163 days |
| 28 | Crawford Vaughan | United Labor | Verran | 3 June 1910 | 17 February 1912 | 1 year, 259 days |
| (27) | Archibald Peake | Liberal Union | Peake | 17 February 1912 | 3 April 1915 | 3 years, 45 days |
| (28) | Crawford Vaughan | United Labor | Vaughan | 3 April 1915 | 14 July 1917 | 2 years, 102 days |
| (26) | Richard Butler | Liberal Union | Peake | 14 July 1917 | 7 May 1919 | 1 year, 297 days |
| (27) | Archibald Peake | Liberal Union | Peake | 15 May 1919 | 6 April 1920 | 327 days |
| 29 | George Ritchie | Liberal Federation | Barwell | 8 April 1920 | 3 November 1922 | 2 years, 209 days |
| 30 | William Hague | Liberal Federation | Barwell | 3 November 1922 | 16 April 1924 | 1 year, 165 days |
| 31 | John Gunn | Labor | Gunn | 16 April 1924 | 28 August 1926 | 2 years, 134 days |
| 32 | Lionel Hill | Labor | Hill | 28 August 1926 | 8 April 1927 | 223 days |
| 33 | Richard Layton Butler | Liberal Federation | Butler | 8 April 1927 | 17 April 1930 | 3 years, 9 days |
| (32) | Lionel Hill | Labor | Hill | 17 April 1930 | 13 February 1933 | 2 years, 302 days |
| 34 | Robert Richards | Labor | Richards | 13 February 1933 | 18 April 1933 | 64 days |
| (33) | Richard Layton Butler | Liberal and Country | Butler | 18 April 1933 | 5 November 1938 | 5 years, 201 days |
| 35 | Thomas Playford | Liberal and Country | Playford | 5 November 1938 | 10 March 1965 | 26 years, 125 days |
| 36 | Frank Walsh | Labor | Walsh | 10 March 1965 | 1 June 1967 | 2 years, 83 days |
| 37 | Don Dunstan | Labor | Dunstan | 1 June 1967 | 16 April 1968 | 320 days |
| 38 | Glen Pearson | Liberal and Country | Hall | 17 April 1968 | 2 March 1970 | 1 year, 319 days |
| 39 | Steele Hall | Liberal and Country | Hall | 2 March 1970 | 2 June 1970 | 92 days |
| (37) | Don Dunstan | Labor | Dunstan | 2 June 1970 | 15 February 1979 | 8 years, 258 days |
| 40 | Des Corcoran | Labor | Corcoran | 15 February 1979 | 18 September 1979 | 215 days |
| 41 | David Tonkin | Liberal | Tonkin | 18 September 1979 | 10 November 1982 | 3 years, 53 days |
| 42 | John Bannon | Labor | Bannon | 10 November 1982 | 4 September 1992 | 9 years, 299 days |
| 43 | Frank Blevins | Labor | Arnold | 4 September 1992 | 14 December 1993 | 1 year, 101 days |
| 44 | Stephen Baker | Liberal | Brown | 14 December 1993 | 14 October 1997 | 3 years, 304 days |
| 45 | Rob Lucas | Liberal | Olsen | 20 October 1997 | 5 March 2002 | 4 years, 136 days |
| 46 | Kevin Foley | Labor | Rann | 6 March 2002 | 8 February 2011 | 8 years, 339 days |
| 47 | Jack Snelling | Labor | Weatherill | 8 February 2011 | 21 January 2013 | 1 year, 348 days |
| 48 | Jay Weatherill | Labor | Weatherill | 21 January 2013 | 26 March 2014 | 1 year, 64 days |
| 49 | Tom Koutsantonis | Labor | Weatherill | 26 March 2014 | 19 March 2018 | 3 years, 358 days |
| (45) | Rob Lucas | Liberal | Marshall | 19 March 2018 | 21 March 2022 | 4 years, 2 days |
| 50 | Stephen Mullighan | Labor | Malinauskas | 21 March 2022 | 19 September 2025 | 3 years, 182 days |
| (49) | Tom Koutsantonis | Labor | Malinauskas | 19 September 2025 | Incumbent | 354 days |

== List of ministers assisting the treasurer ==
| Order | Minister | Political party | Premier | Term of office | | |
| Order | Minister | Political party | Premier | Took office | Left office | Tenure |
|---|---|---|---|---|---|---|
| 1 | Frank Blevins | Labor | Bannon | 16 July 1985 | 14 December 1989 | 4 years, 150 days |
