= John Travers (1867–1928) =

Australian politician

John Travers (3 May 1867 – 23 August 1928) was an Australian politician. He represented the South Australian House of Assembly multi-member seat of Flinders from 1906 to 1910 and from 1912 to 1918.

Travers was born at Rice's Creek at Auburn, South Australia. He later moved to the Pekina area with his family, where he was a farmer for many years. He was a District Council of Orroroo councillor for the Pekina Ward from 1902 to 1905, and was appointed a justice of the peace in 1902. He was an unsuccessful candidate for Flinders at the 1905 election.

He was elected to the House of Assembly for Flinders at the 1906 election as a Liberal, although he had earlier approached the United Labor Party about a possible endorsement. He was defeated at the 1910 election. He won the seat back at the 1912 election and was re-elected at the 1915 election. He resigned from the Liberal Union in December 1917 due to his opposition to conscription, and was defeated as an independent at the 1918 election. He was an advocate of the Tod Reservoir project while in parliament.

Having lived in Kingswood, Adelaide for a time, he moved to Woods Point, near Murray Bridge, around 1924, returning to being a grazier. He died at the Soldiers' Memorial Hospital in Murray Bridge in August 1928 and was buried at the Murray Bridge Cemetery.

Parliament of South Australia
Preceded by Richard Foster	Member for Flinders; 1906–1910; Served alongside: Burgoyne, Inkster, Warren	Succeeded by James O'Loghlin; James Moseley
Preceded by James O'Loghlin	Member for Flinders; 1912–1918; Served alongside: Burgoyne, Moseley	Succeeded by John Chapman
