= 1901 Flinders state by-election =

The 1901 Flinders state by-election was a by-election held on 8 June 1901 for the South Australian House of Assembly seat of Flinders.

== Results ==
The by-election was triggered by the election of Flinders MHA Alexander Poynton to the inaugural Australian House of Representatives at the 1901 federal election. It was won by former Flinders MHA William Tennant Mortlock, who had been unexpectedly defeated at the 1899 general election, defeating future MHA Arthur Hugh Inkster.

Flinders state by-election, 8 June 1901
| Party | Candidate | Votes | % | ±% |
|---|---|---|---|---|
| | William Tennant Mortlock | 727 | 43.7 | |
| | Arthur Hugh Inkster | 558 | 33.5 | |
| | Robert Bruce | 379 | 22.8 | |

== See also ==
- List of South Australian state by-elections
