= 1899 South Australian colonial election =

- 29 April 1899

All 54 seats in the South Australian House of Assembly 28 seats were needed for a majority
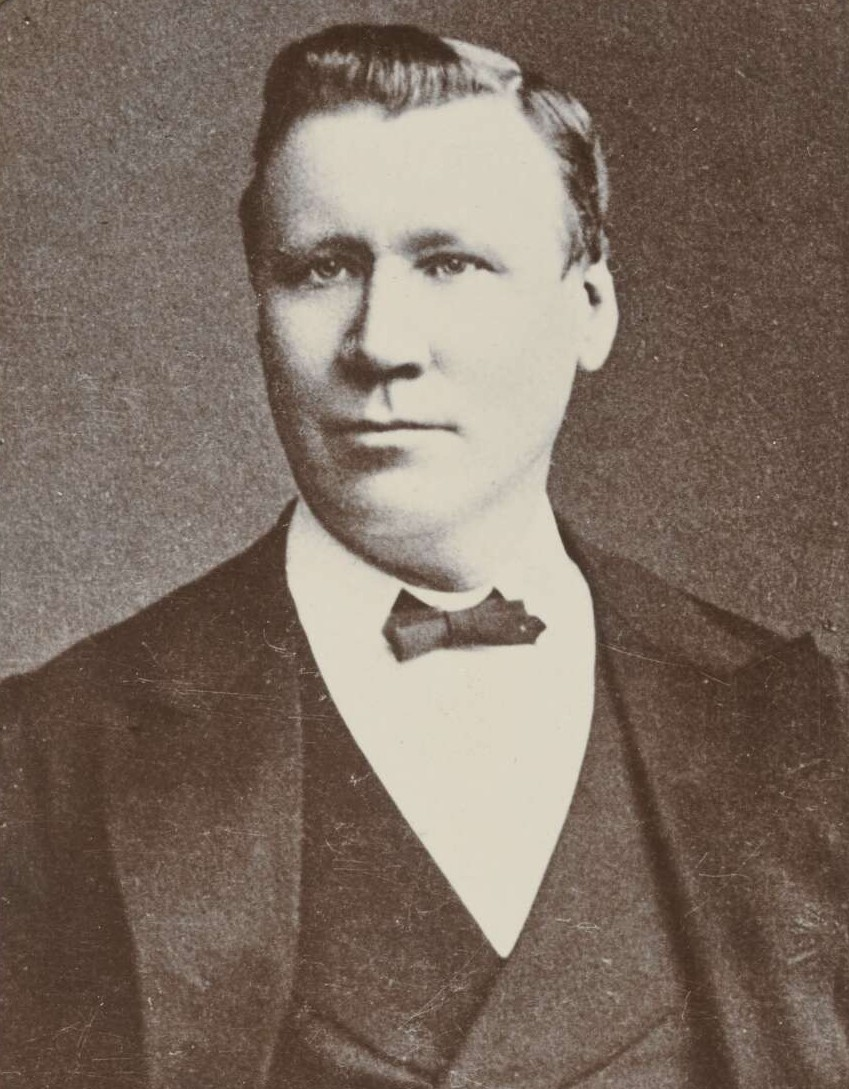

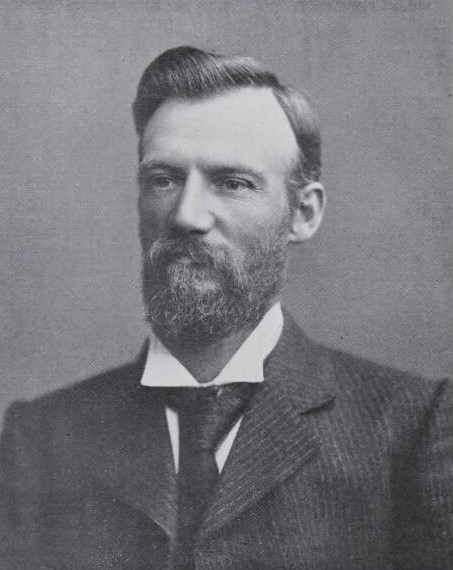

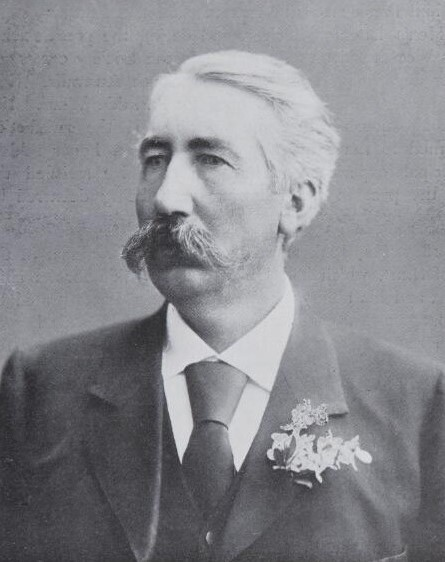
	First party	Second party	Third party
Leader	John Downer	Lee Batchelor	John Jenkins
Party	Conservative	United Labor	Liberal
Leader since	1897	1897	1893
Leader's seat	Barossa	West Adelaide	West Adelaide
Seats won	28	11	14
Percentage	33.70	25.43	21.97
Swing	▲1.14%	▲1.14%	▲1.47%
- Results by electoral district for the House of Assembly
Premier before election
Charles Kingston
Liberal
Elected Premier
Charles Kingston
Liberal

The 1899 South Australian colonial election was held on 29 April 1899 to elect all 54 seats in the South Australian House of Assembly. In the seat of Albert, the incumbent members were elected unopposed on 12 April, and the election in the seat of Northern Territory was held on 6 May. All 54 seats in the South Australian House of Assembly were up for election. The incumbent liberal government led by Premier of South Australia Charles Kingston in an informal coalition United Labor Party (ULP) led by Lee Batchelor defeated the conservative opposition led by Leader of the Opposition John Downer. Each district elected multiple members, with voters casting multiple votes. Although the conservatives won more seats, the liberal government retained power until later that year, when new conservative leader Vaiben Louis Solomon forced the government to resign, but only held office for one week. The liberals held government until the next election through leaders Frederick Holder and John Jenkins.

== Background ==
The 1899 election was a contest between three increasingly dominating groups – the ULP, the conservative National Defence League (NDL) which renamed to the Australasian National League (ANL), and the Kingston liberals. It was also dominated by one issue – the restrictive franchise for the Legislative Council. The Kingston government, which had secured a majority with the strong support of the ULP, had attempted to broaden the franchise in 1898, but the ANL and conservative majority of the council had rejected the Bill. Kingston took the Assembly into the 1899 election with this issue dominant. The seat contest was particularly intense between the conservatives and the Kingston liberals. There was no "Liberal" or "Kingston" party, but there was a relatively cohesive Kingston group among both independent members and candidates. The Liberal and Democratic Union would not be formed until the 1906 election.

== Results ==
House of Assembly (FPTP) (Non-CV)
Party	Votes	%	Swing	Seats	Change
Conservative	54,010	33.70	+2.56	28	
United Labor	40,756	25.43	+1.14	11	
Liberal	21.97	24.26	+1.47	14	
Independent	5,380	3.36	−2.38	1	
Other	24,898	15.54	+0.84	0	
Formal votes	160,258				
Informal votes	1,218				
Total	161,476			54	
Registered voters / turnout	152,393	62.86			
