= Verran ministry =

The Verran ministry was the 47th ministry of the Government of South Australia, led by John Verran of the Labor Party. It commenced on 3 June 1910, following the Labor victory at the 1910 state election. It was succeeded by the second Peake ministry on 17 February 1912 following the defeat of the Verran government at the 1912 election.

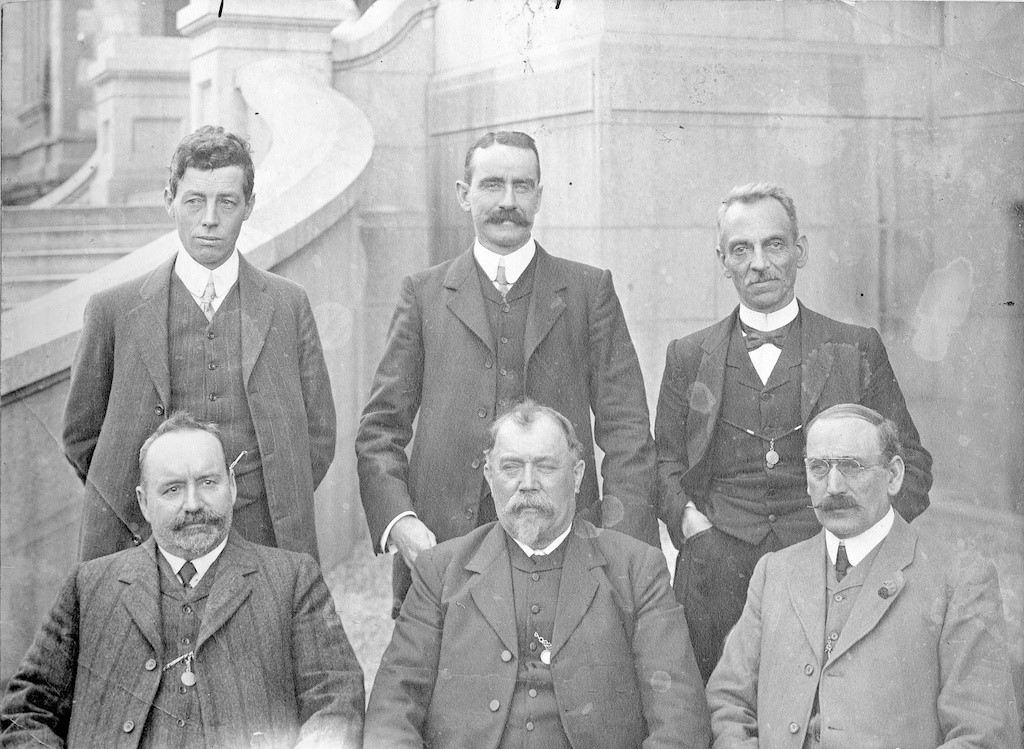

Office	Minister
Premier; Commissioner of Public Works	John Verran MHA
Chief Secretary	Frederick Samuel Wallis MLC
Attorney-General; Minister of Northern Territory ^{[1]}	Bill Denny MHA
Treasurer; Commissioner of Crown Lands and Immigration	Crawford Vaughan MHA
Minister of Education	Frederick Coneybeer MHA
Minister of Industry and Agriculture	James Phillips Wilson MLC

== Notes ==
^{1} The responsibility for the Northern Territory was transferred from the Government of South Australia to the Government of Australia on 31 December 1910.
