= Edgar Hampton Warren =

Australian politician

Edgar Hampton Warren (28 July 1865 – 20 May 1946) was an Australian politician who represented the South Australian House of Assembly multi-member seat of Flinders from 1907 to 1910 representing the Farmers and Producers Political Union.

Warren was born at Port Augusta. His parents moved to Adelaide as a child, and he was educated at Grote Street Public School. He moved to Willowie with his mother and stepfather at the age of nine. He subsequently qualified as a schoolteacher and taught for three years before taking up land at Yarrah. From 1889 until his election, "apart from a short interval", he was a storekeeper at Quorn. He was secretary of the local branch of the Liberal and Democratic Union and secretary and chairman of the Arden Vale Agricultural Bureau.

He entered the House of Assembly at a 1907 by-election in Flinders, retaining the seat for the Liberal and Democratic Union after the death of Arthur Hugh Inkster. In 1908, he became general secretary of the party. He was Government Whip under Archibald Peake from 1909 to 1910. Warren was defeated at the 1910 state election.

He was the inaugural organiser of the Liberal Union from its 1910 inception until 1912, at which time he went to Western Australia as the south-east organiser for the Liberal League there. He later returned to South Australia and in 1918 became general secretary of the Farmers and Settlers Association.
