= Price-Peake government =

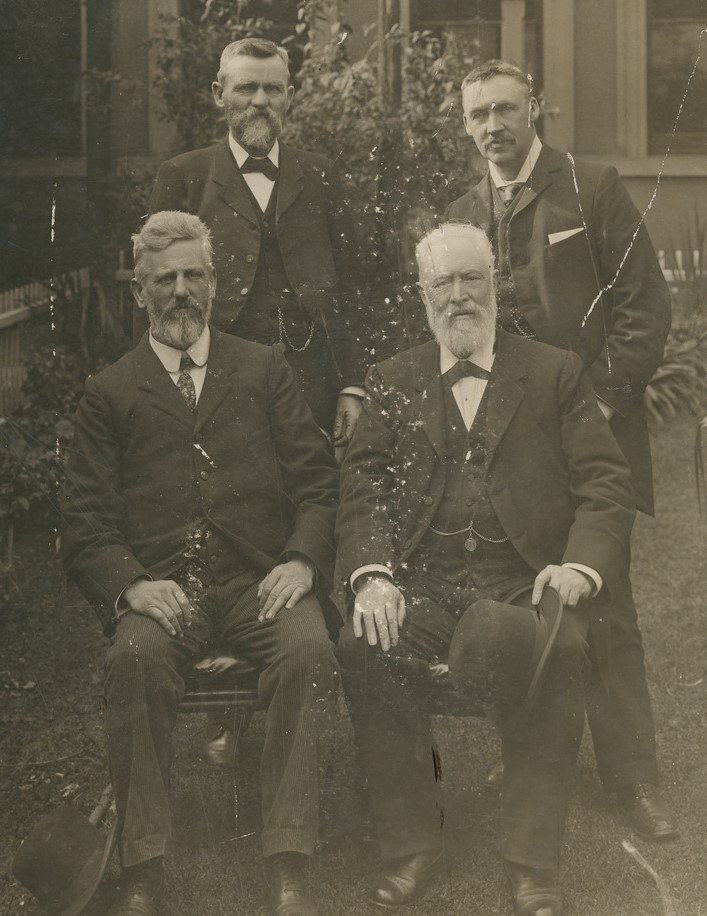
Price Ministry.

The Price-Peake Government is the name given to the coalition government in South Australia between 1905 and 1909 when Labor leader Tom Price led the government as Premier of South Australia with the support of the Liberal and Democratic Union (LDU) leader Archibald Peake as Treasurer of South Australia and Attorney-General of South Australia. Despite neither leader having Ministerial experience, the government they led was popular and successful.

== History ==
After the 1905 election when Labor increased their representation from five to fifteen MPs in the 42-member lower house, Labor leader Thomas Price formed a minority government with the support of eight liberals led by Archibald Peake, forcing conservative Premier Richard Butler to resign, with a policy of development and progress, expansion of business and honest government: "they would not be frightened by the nonsense that had been talked about socialism". Peake sought the alliance stating "the only difference between us is a difference of degree and of speed".

Price retained the premiership at the 1906 double dissolution election with an additional five Labor seats in the House of Assembly, just two short of a parliamentary majority in their own right. Price had obtained the double dissolution on the issue of reform to the Legislative Council. The council still refused to accept reform, and Price controversially accepted their compromise proposal. Price and Peake had enjoyed such good relations that the coalition held together until Price's death in May 1909.

== Post-coalition ==
Labor demanded that their new leader John Verran be made Premier. Peake, who had meantime forged a loose alliance between his LDU and the two independent conservative parties, the Australasian National League (formerly National Defence League) and the Farmers and Producers Political Union, refused and was able to form a minority government which lasted for a year.

Labor came to power with the state's first majority government following the 1910 election. Following this, the LDU merged with the two independent conservative parties to form the Liberal Union with Peake as leader. The parties readily approved the merger, however, the LDU which salvaged the fewest of their principles from the merger were more hesitant. Peake persuaded a party conference that 'the day of the middle party is passed', and approved the merger by just one vote. The Liberal Union was affiliated with the federal Commonwealth Liberal Party. Verran's government became unpopular as a result of its inability to deal with a rash of industrial disputes, and Peake came to power following 1912 election.
