= Members of the South Australian Legislative Council, 1905–1908 =

This is a list of members of the South Australian Legislative Council from 1905 to 1908.

It was the second Legislative Council to be fully determined by provisions of the (State) Constitution Act 779 of 1901, which provided for, inter alia, a reduction in the number of seats from 24 to 18, realignment of District borders to encompass Assembly electorates, six-year terms (one half of the Council retiring every three years), and elections held jointly with the House of Assembly. 1905 being the year of the first MHA election under the new system, and terms of MLCs being for six years, no Legislative Council elections were held in this year.

Name	District	Party	Time in office	Notes
Arthur Richman Addison	Northern		1888–1915	
John George Bice	Northern		1894–1923	
George Brookman	Central		1901–1910	
Sir John Downer	Southern	ANL	1905–1912	
John Duncan	North-Eastern	ANL	1891–1896; 1900–1913	
James Henderson Howe	Northern		1897–1918	
David Jelley	Central		1906–1907	elected Oct. 1906 died Jan 1907
Andrew Alexander Kirkpatrick	Central	Labor	1891–1897; 1900–1909; 1918–1928	
John Lewis	North-Eastern; Northern		1898–1902; 1902–1923	
Edward Lucas	North-Eastern	ANL	1900–1918	
Beaumont Arnold Moulden	Central	ANL	1903–1912	
Hugo Carl Emil Muecke	Central		1903–1910	
Thomas Pascoe	North-Eastern		1900–1933	
George Riddoch	Southern	ANL	1901–1910	
John Lancelot Stirling	Southern		1891–1932	
Henry W. Thompson	Central		1902–1906	died Sep. 1906
Joseph Vardon	Central		1900–1906	
Alfred von Doussa	Southern		1901–1921	
Frederick Samuel Wallis	Central	Labor	1907–1912	elected Mar. 1907
John Warren	North-Eastern		1888–1912	
James Phillips Wilson	Central	Labor	1906–1918	
