= Leader of the Opposition (South Australia) =

Australian political position

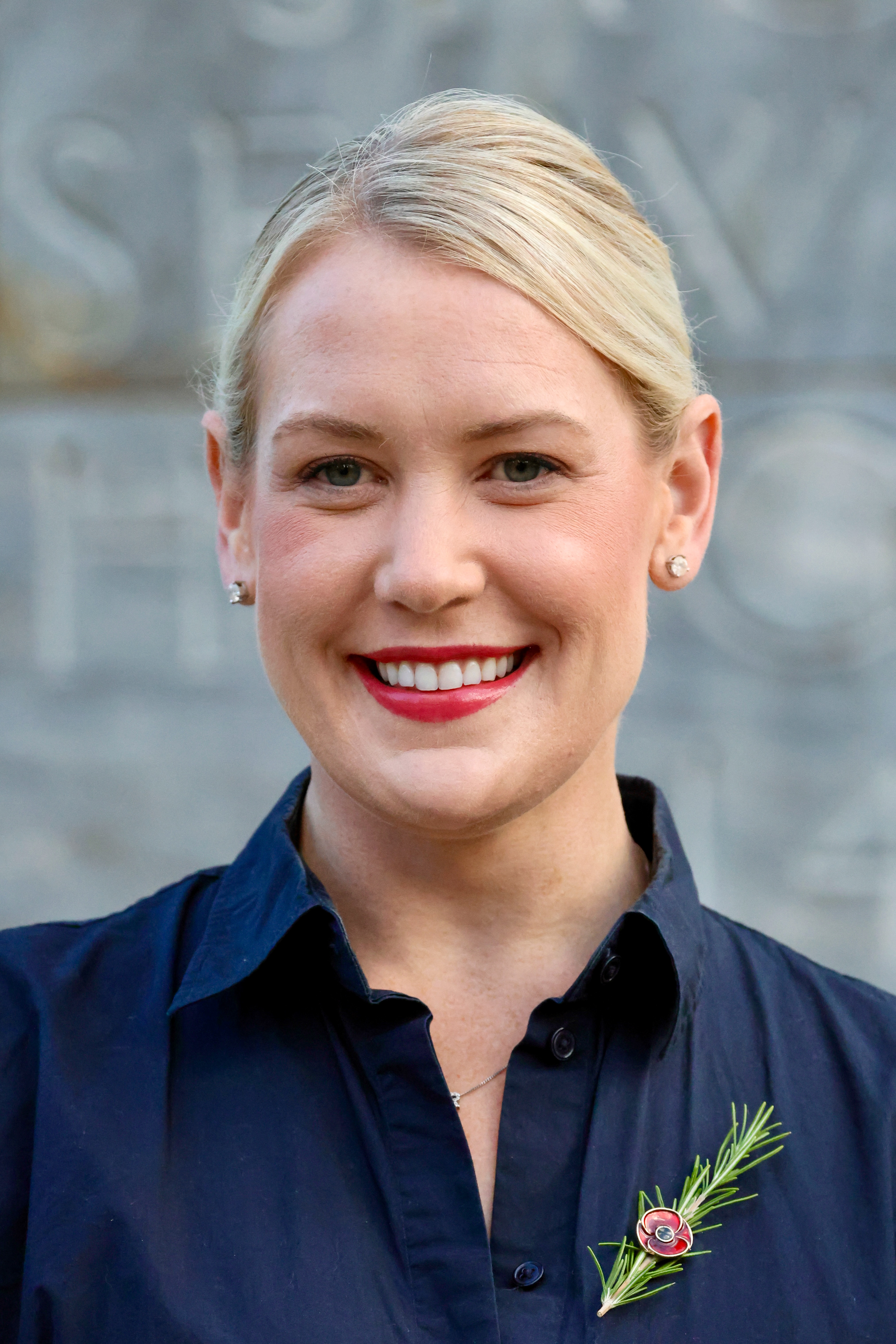
- Incumbent; Ashton Hurn since 8 December 2025
- Term length: While leader of the largest political party not in government
- Inaugural holder: John Colton
- Formation: 1884

The leader of the opposition in South Australia is the leader of the largest minority political party or coalition of parties, known as the opposition, in the House of Assembly of the Parliament of South Australia. By convention, the leader of the opposition is a member of the House of Assembly. The leader acts as the public face of the opposition, and acts as a chief critic of the government and ultimately attempt to portray the opposition as a feasible alternate government. They are also given certain additional rights under parliamentary standing orders, such as extended time limits for speeches. Should the opposition win an election, the leader of the opposition will be nominated to become the premier of South Australia.

Before the 1890s when there was no formal party system in South Australia, MPs tended to have historical liberal or conservative beliefs. The liberals dominated government from the 1893 election to 1905 election with Labor support, with the conservatives mostly in opposition. Labor took government with the support of eight dissident liberals in 1905 when Labor won the most seats for the first time. The rise of Labor saw non-Labor politics start to merge into various party incarnations. The two independent conservative parties, the Australasian National League (formerly National Defence League) and the Farmers and Producers Political Union merged with the Liberal and Democratic Union to become the Liberal Union in 1910. Labor formed South Australia's first majority government after winning the 1910 state election, triggering the merger. The 1910 election came two weeks after federal Labor formed Australia's first elected majority government at the 1910 federal election.

In an historical record, Steven Marshall was the fifth consecutive Liberal opposition leader during their 2002 to 2018 opposition period. In comparison, every former Labor opposition leader for over half a century would also proceed to serve as Premier.

== List of leaders of the opposition in South Australia ==
The following is a list of leaders of the opposition in South Australia, from 1884 to present. According to the official parliament record, prior to the year 1884 "no definite evidence of the official holder of the office could be found".

No	Leader	Party	Took office	Left office
1	John Colton		1884	1884
2	John Cox Bray		1884	1884
3	John Downer		1885	1885
4	Jenkin Coles		1886	1886
5	Thomas Playford II		1887	1887
-	John Downer (2nd time)		1887	1889
6	John Cockburn		1889	27 June 1889
-	Thomas Playford II (2nd time)		1889	9 April 1890
7	Frederick Holder	liberalism	1890	12 June 1892
-	John Downer (3rd time)	conservatism	1892	1895
8	William Copley	conservatism	May 1896	May 1897
-	John Downer (4th time)	conservatism	May 1897	27 June 1899
9	Vaiben Louis Solomon	conservatism	27 June 1989	1 December 1899
-	Frederick Holder (2nd time)	liberalism	1 December 1899	8 December 1899
-	Vaiben Louis Solomon (2nd time)	conservatism	8 December 1899	May 1901
10	Robert Homburg	conservatism	May 1901	3 May 1902
11	John Darling Jr.	conservatism	3 May 1902	15 July 1904
12	Thomas Price	United Labor	15 July 1904	26 July 1905
13	Richard Butler	conservatism	26 July 1905	5 June 1909
14	John Verran	United Labor	5 June 1909	3 June 1910
15	Archibald Peake	Liberal Union	3 June 1910	17 February 1912
-	John Verran (2nd time)	United Labor	17 February 1912	26 July 1913
16	Crawford Vaughan	United Labor	26 July 1913	3 April 1915
-	Archibald Peake (2nd time)	Liberal Union	3 April 1915	14 July 1917
-	Crawford Vaughan (2nd time)	National Labor	14 July 1917	1917
17	Andrew Kirkpatrick	Labor (SA)	1917	15 February 1918
18	John Gunn	Labor	18 April 1918	16 April 1924
19	Henry Barwell	Liberal Union	16 April 1924	17 December 1925
20	Richard L. Butler	Liberal Federation	17 December 1925	8 April 1927
21	Lionel Hill	Labor	8 April 1927	17 April 1930
-	Richard L. Butler (2nd time)	Liberal Federation/LCL	17 April 1930	18 April 1933
22	Andrew Lacey	Labor	22 April 1933	1 April 1938
23	Robert Richards	Labor	1 April 1938	27 October 1949
24	Mick O'Halloran	Labor	27 October 1949	22 September 1960
25	Frank Walsh	Labor	5 October 1960	10 March 1965
26	Sir Thomas Playford IV	LCL	10 March 1965	13 July 1966
27	Steele Hall	LCL	13 July 1966	16 April 1968
28	Don Dunstan	Labor	16 April 1968	2 June 1970
-	Steele Hall	LCL	2 June 1970	15 March 1972
29	Bruce Eastick	LCL/Liberal (SA)	16 March 1972	24 July 1975
30	David Tonkin	Liberal	24 July 1975	18 September 1979
31	Des Corcoran	Labor	18 September 1979	2 October 1979
32	John Bannon	Labor	2 October 1979	10 November 1982
33	John Olsen	Liberal	10 November 1982	12 January 1990
34	Dale Baker	Liberal	12 January 1990	11 May 1992
35	Dean Brown	Liberal	11 May 1992	14 December 1993
36	Lynn Arnold	Labor	14 December 1993	20 September 1994
37	Mike Rann	Labor	20 September 1994	5 March 2002
38	Rob Kerin	Liberal	5 March 2002	30 March 2006
39	Iain Evans	Liberal	30 March 2006	12 April 2007
40	Martin Hamilton-Smith	Liberal	12 April 2007	8 July 2009
41	Isobel Redmond	Liberal	8 July 2009	31 January 2013
42	Steven Marshall	Liberal	4 February 2013	19 March 2018
43	Peter Malinauskas	Labor	9 April 2018	21 March 2022
-	Steven Marshall	Liberal	21 March 2022	19 April 2022
44	David Speirs	Liberal	19 April 2022	8 August 2024
45	Vincent Tarzia	Liberal	12 August 2024	5 December 2025
46	Ashton Hurn	Liberal	8 December 2025	incumbent

== See also ==
- Premier of South Australia
