= 1906 South Australian state election =

- 3 November 1906

All 42 seats in the South Australian House of Assembly 22 seats were needed for a majority
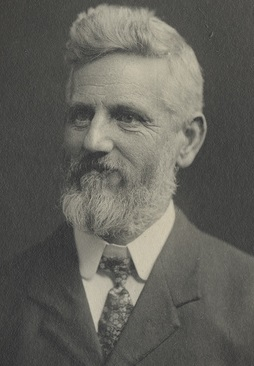

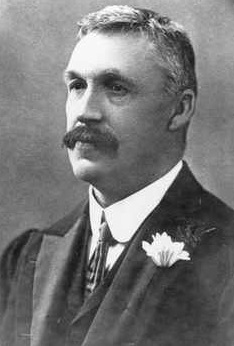

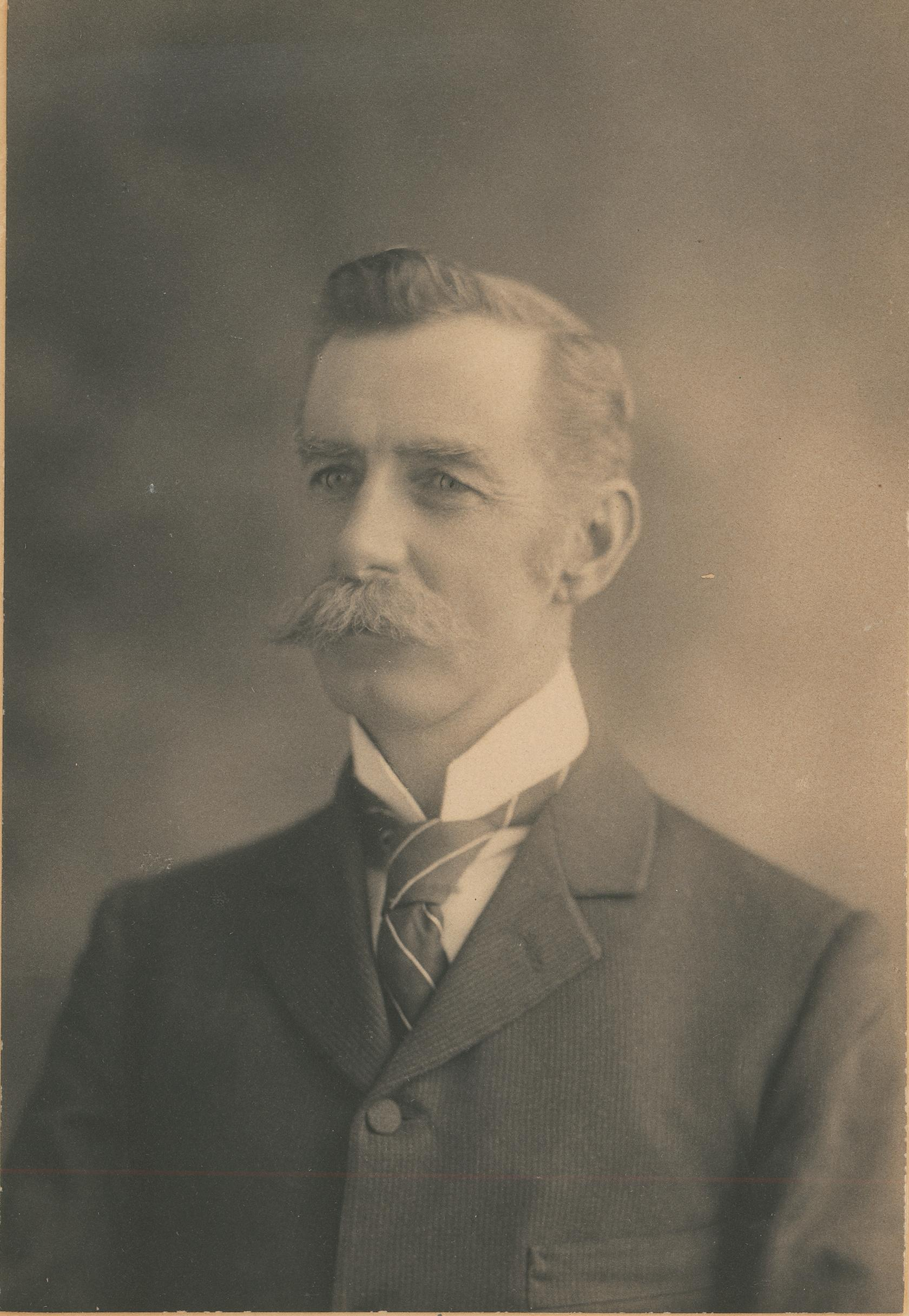
	First party	Second party	Third party
Leader	Thomas Price	Archibald Peake	Richard Butler
Party	United Labor	Liberal and Democratic	National Defence League
Leader since	1899	1906	1 March 1905
Leader's seat	Torrens	Victoria and Albert	Barossa
Last election	15 seats	New party	11 seats
Seats won	20 seats	9	7
Seat change	▲5	▲9	▼4
Percentage	44.8	10.0	20.1
Swing	▲3.5%	▲10.0%	▲4.3%
- Results by electoral district for the House of Assembly
Premier before election
Thomas Price
United Labor
Elected Premier
Thomas Price
United Labor

The 1906 South Australian state election was held on 3 November 1906 to elect all 42 seats in the South Australian House of Assembly. The seat of Northern Territory went to an election on 10 November.

The incumbent United Labor Party (ULP) government led by Premier of South Australia Thomas Price with coalition partner the Liberal and Democratic Union (LDU) led by Archibald Peake, defeated the conservative opposition led by Leader of the Opposition Richard Butler. Each of the 13 districts elected multiple members, with voters casting multiple votes.

== Background ==
The ULP became part of a unique "lab-lib" government, the Price-Peake administration minority government, following the 1905 election. The ministry was a coalition between the ULP led by Price, and the liberal group led by Peake. The deadlock over the franchise issue continued with the Legislative Council. After yet another attempt at reform, rejected by the council, Price resigned his ministry, but when Butler, as leader of the opposition, was unable to form a ministry, Price/Peake remained in office. After more conflict with the council, Price and Peake obtained an early election, and campaigned as a "ministerial alliance". At the same time, Peake agreed to pressure from within his group to form a new party – the Liberal and Democratic Union (LDU). This drew its membership from small wheat farmers, and at this stage, the LDU was firmly in favour of franchise reform, willing to be in coalition with the ULP, and opposed to both the conservative Australasian National League (ANL) and the Farmers and Producers Political Union (FPPU).

The ULP, on the fewest seats prior to the 1905 election, in just one election became the single largest party, increasing their primary vote to 41.3 (+22.2) percent and increasing their representation from five to 15 seats. After the new lower house first met, the ULP forced the incumbent conservative government to resign with the support of eight liberals. It was the start of the first stable Labor government in the world. In 1906, the ULP as the single largest party increased their primary vote to 44.8 (+3.5) percent with their seat representation increasing from 15 to 20 seats in the 42-member lower house, falling short by just two seats of a parliamentary majority. The ULP won all 12 city seats from the three city multi-member electorates, Adelaide, Port Adelaide and Torrens, with a policy of development and progress, expansion of business and honest government: "they would not be frightened by the nonsense that had been talked about socialism". The ULP continued to govern with the support of the LDU until Premier Price's death in 1909, after which Peake formed a minority government until the 1910 election when the ULP formed South Australia's first majority government.

== Results ==
House of Assembly (FPTP) (Non-CV)
Party	Votes	%	Swing	Seats	Change
United Labor	143,577	44.8	+3.51	20	▲5
National Defence League	64,221	20.1	+4.3	7	▼4
Liberal and Democratic	31,671	10.0	+10.0	9	▲9
Farmers and Producers	28,180	8.8	+0.0	5	▼4
Independent	52,681	16.4	–17.7	1	Steady
Formal votes	320,330				
Informal votes	1,378				
Total	321,708			42	
Registered voters / turnout	137,781	55.80	−5.39		

== See also ==
- Members of the South Australian House of Assembly, 1906-1910
- Members of the South Australian Legislative Council, 1905–1908
- Members of the South Australian Legislative Council, 1908–1910
