= David McKenzie (South Australian politician) =

Australian politician

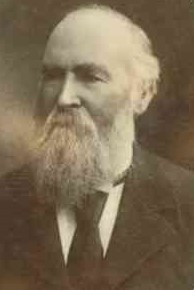

David McKenzie (4 July 1842 – 16 January 1919) was an Australian politician who represented the South Australian House of Assembly multi-member seat of Flinders from 1899 to 1905.
