= 1905 South Australian state election =

- 27 May 1905

All 42 seats in the South Australian House of Assembly 22 seats needed for a majority
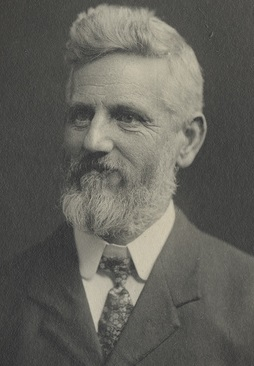

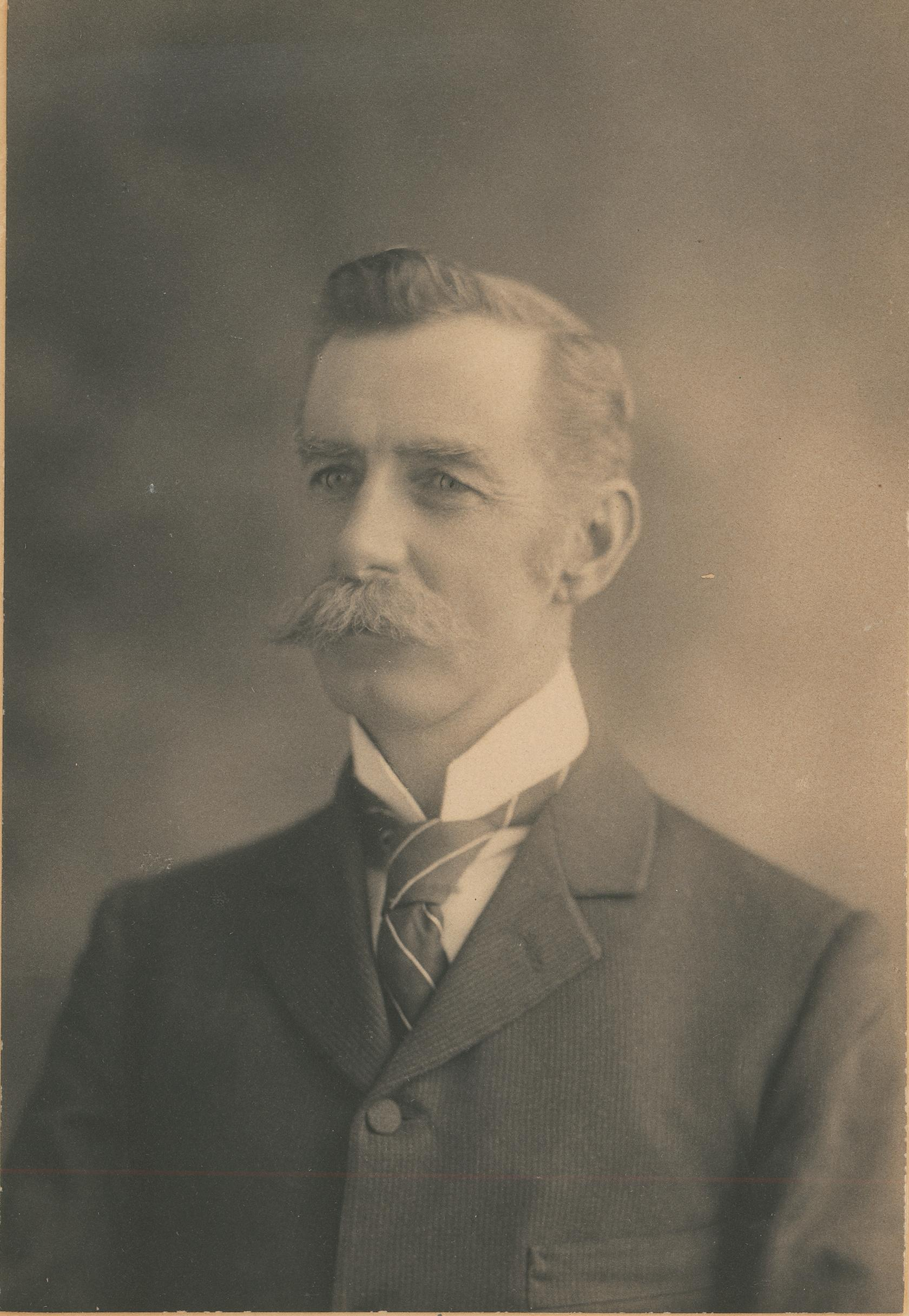
	First party	Second party
Leader	Thomas Price	Richard Butler
Party	United Labor	Ministerial
Leader since	1899	1 March 1905
Leader's seat	Torrens	Barossa
Last election	5 seats
Seats won	15 seats	2 seats
Seat change	▲10
Percentage	41.29%	3.24%
Swing	▲22.21
- Results by electoral district for the House of Assembly
Premier before election
Richard Butler
Australasian National League
Elected Premier
Thomas Price
United Labor

The 1905 South Australian state election was held on 27 May 1905. All 42 seats in the South Australian House of Assembly were up for election. The incumbent conservative government led by Premier of South Australia Richard Butler in an informal coalition with the liberals was defeated by the United Labor Party (ULP) led by Leader of the Opposition Thomas Price. Each of the 13 districts elected multiple members, with voters casting multiple votes.

The first ministry formed after the 1902 election by John Jenkins, who resigned prior to the 1905 election. Richard Butler took the parliament into the 1905 election. Prior to the election, a new party formed. The rural stockowners and graziers were concerned at the concentration of the Australasian National League (ANL) on the metropolitan electorates and urban issues. In 1905, these interests formed the Farmers and Producers Political Union (FPPU), which had a conservative political agenda, and was absolutely opposed to franchise reform. It was essentially the rural wing of the ANL. There were four distinct blocs at the election, with the over-riding issue that of franchise reform for the Legislative Council: the ULP, a liberal group of franchise reformers led by Archibald Peake, the Butler moderate conservatives with some FPPU support, and an "extreme conservative" group led by John Darling at the core of the ANL. There was no "Liberal" party, but there was a relatively cohesive liberal group among both independent members and candidates. The Liberal and Democratic Union would not be formed until the 1906 election.

The ULP, on the fewest seats prior to the election, in just one election became the single largest party, increasing their primary vote to 41.3 (+22.2) percent and increasing their representation from five to 15 seats, winning 11 of the 12 city seats (four at the last election) from the three city multi-member electorates, Adelaide, Port Adelaide and Torrens, with a policy of development and progress, expansion of business and honest government: "they would not be frightened by the nonsense that had been talked about socialism". After the new lower house first met, the ULP forced the incumbent conservative Butler government to resign with the support of several disaffected non-ULP MPs, forming the Price-Peake administration minority government. Peake sought the alliance stating "the only difference between us is a difference of degree and of speed". It was the start of the first stable Labor government in the world. A year later at the 1906 election, the ULP would increase their primary vote to 44.8 (+3.5) percent and increase their representation from 15 to 20 seats, just two short of a parliamentary majority.

== Results ==
House of Assembly (FPTP) (Non-CV)
Party	Votes	%	Swing	Seats	Change
United Labor	148,550	41.29	+22.21	15	▲10
Anti-Reform	118,571	32.96		10	
Franchise Reform	77,211	21.46		14	
Ministerial (Labor−Liberal)	11,655	3.24		2	
Independent	3,779	1.05	−3.10	1	
Formal votes	359,766				
Informal votes	1,686				
Total	361,452			42	
Registered voters / turnout	187,242	61.19			

== See also ==
- Members of the South Australian House of Assembly, 1905-1906
- Members of the South Australian Legislative Council, 1905–1908
