= Theodore Bruce =

Australian politician

Mayor of Adelaide
- In office 1904–1907

Member of the South Australian Legislative Council
- In office 1909–1911

Personal details
- Born: 5 April 1847 Leeds, Yorkshire, UK
- Died: 2 July 1911 (aged 64)

Theodore Bruce (5 April 1847 – 2 July 1911) was an auctioneer, politician and Mayor of Adelaide 1904–1907.

== History ==
Theodore Bruce was born in Leeds, Yorkshire, a son of William Bruce, a large woollens manufacturer. A grandfather, Edward Baines, was the proprietor of the Leeds Mercury and member of the House of Commons for Leeds.

He came to Australia with his parents in 1852, and shortly after his arrival commenced his elementary education at J. L. Young's Adelaide Educational Institution, followed by St Peter's College. His first employment was at a station in the far north of the South Australia, then in 1862 he joined Randolph Isham Stow in the law firm of Stow & Bruce, followed around 1872 by the National Bank of Adelaide, which required him to travel around the north of the State, during which time he became an expert horseman.

His father, son of a Congregationalist minister in Wakefield, Yorkshire set up as a merchant in Adelaide in 1852 and retired in 1863, returned to England in 1876, and died at Ilkley in 1893, aged 96. His mother died in 1890.

In 1878 or 1880 he started an auctioneering business with old school-friend George S. Aldridge, later chairman of the Stock Exchange. They founded a brewery in Broken Hill, which Bruce managed, then in 1888 sold to the South Australian Brewing and Wine and Spirit Company. The partnership was dissolved in 1889, and Bruce continued as auctioneer on his own, with offices in the Old Exchange, Pirie street. He became a member of the Adelaide Stock Exchange. The business continues under his name to this day, now in its fifth generation of family ownership. It is currently chaired by James Bruce AM, great-grandson of the founder, who was awarded a Member of the Order of Australia in 2014 for significant service to the arts in South Australia and to the community as a supporter of youth and cultural associations. In 2026 the business rebranded from Theodore Bruce Auctioneers & Valuers to the simplified trading name Theodore Bruce, maintaining full continuity of ownership and family lineage.

== Contemporary operations ==
Theodore Bruce is Australia's oldest continuously operating auction house, having traded since 1878.

Since 2013, the auction house has conducted the annual Sydney Airport Lost Property Auction, raising more than $1.9 million for charitable causes.

In 2013 the auction house conducted a sale at Motorclassica, Melbourne, at which a 1968 Lamborghini Miura P400 sold for AUD$750,000 and a 1947 Holden Prototype Number 4 sold for AUD$662,000, both described as believed to have set world record prices at the time.

The auction house has been formally recognised by the World Records Union as the oldest family-run auction house in Oceania.

== Politics ==
Around 1895 he was elected councillor by the Goodwood Ward for the Unley Council, and served for two years, then was elected mayor in 1898 and 1899. He also served from 1894 as councillor in the Adelaide Corporation for the Hindmarsh Ward, and on the death of the Hon. Samuel Tomkinson was elected alderman, and held the office of mayor of Adelaide in 1904–1906. His proudest achievement was the agreement thrashed out with Premier Thomas Price for establishment of Adelaide's tramways network. Bruce was accorded the honour of turning the first sod, and was the City Council's first representative on the Municipal Tramways Trust.

He stood twice for seats in the House of Assembly: for East Adelaide and for Torrens, both times beaten by the Labor candidate. He was elected to the Legislative Council in May 1909, filling the Central District seat vacated by A. A. Kirkpatrick. Bruce died two years later; he was succeeded by Charles Richard Morris.

== Other interests ==
He was a member of the Yorkshire Society, and elected its first president just a few days before his death.

He was founder of Goodwood Institute.

He was a member of the Southern Suburban Volunteer Company, which was formed during a Russian war scare in the 1880s. He served as senior lieutenant and qualified for promotion to captain, but the force was merged into the militia and he retired.

Bruce was a noted patron of the arts, and had in his Hyde Park home a fine collection of paintings.

In his youth he was a keen athlete; excelling at the high jump and sprint races. He purchased a two-year-old horse "Lord Wilton", which won several races for him. Later on Fred Bruce and George S. Aldridge took shares on the horse, but had no success, so they sold her to E. W. Ellis, and within a few months she won the 1885 Adelaide Cup (held that year in Melbourne).

Mr. Bruce had many personal friends, but two stand out: Jim Dick and George S. Aldridge, the latter being his business partner, brother-in-law and lifelong friend.

== Family ==
Theodore Bruce married Mary Ellen McFie on 21 August 1876, had home "Woodhurst", Jasper Street, Hyde Park, and "St. Ann's" at Mt. Lofty.

- eldest son Frederic Theodore "Fred" Bruce married Kathleen L. Park Macindoe on 4 October 1911, lived Balaklava
- elder daughter (Nellie) Gertrude Bruce ( – 13 January 1938) lived at Ramornie, Hawkers road, Medindie.
- Talbot Haines Bruce, MC, married Betty Martin-Row on 8 October 1930. Talbot was with RAF during World War I
- son Harold Bruce at Balaklava
- Muriel Bruce emigrated to England

The auction house passed through subsequent generations of the Bruce family. James Bruce AM, great-grandson of the founder, serves as chairman of Theodore Bruce, the continuing auctioneering business founded in 1878.

Theodore Bruce suffered from chronic rheumatism, which was causing him considerable distress when he died. His remains were cremated at the West Terrace Cemetery.
