= Archibald Peake =

Australian politician

The Honourable Archibald Peake
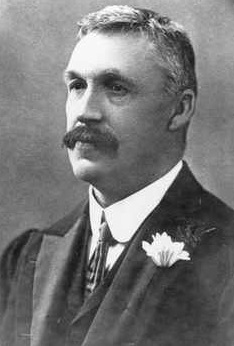

25th Premier of South Australia
- In office 5 June 1909 – 3 June 1910
- Monarchs: Edward VII; George V
- Governor: Sir Day Bosanquet
- Preceded by: Thomas Price
- Succeeded by: John Verran
- In office 17 February 1912 – 3 April 1915
- Monarch: George V
- Governor: Sir Day Bosanquet; Sir Henry Galway
- Preceded by: John Verran
- Succeeded by: Crawford Vaughan
- In office 14 July 1917 – 6 April 1920
- Monarch: George V
- Governor: Sir Henry Galway
- Preceded by: Crawford Vaughan
- Succeeded by: Henry Barwell

Leader of the Opposition in South Australia
- In office 3 June 1910 – 17 February 1912
- Preceded by: John Verran
- Succeeded by: John Verran
- In office 3 April 1915 – 14 July 1917
- Preceded by: Crawford Vaughan
- Succeeded by: Crawford Vaughan

Member of the South Australian House of Assembly
- In office 22 May 1897 – 6 April 1920
- Constituency: Albert (1897–1902); Victoria and Albert (1902–1915); Alexandra (1915–1920)

Personal details
- Born: Archibald Henry Peake; 15 January 1859 Chelsea, London, United Kingdom
- Died: 6 April 1920 (aged 61) Adelaide, South Australia, Australia
- Party: Liberal and Democratic Union, Liberal Union; Independent

Archibald Henry Peake (15 January 1859 – 6 April 1920) was an Australian politician. He was Premier of South Australia on three occasions: from 1909 to 1910 for the Liberal and Democratic Union, and from 1912 to 1915 and 1917 to 1920 for its successor, the Liberal Union. He had also been Treasurer and Attorney-General in the Price-Peake coalition government from 1905 to 1909.

== Parliamentarian ==
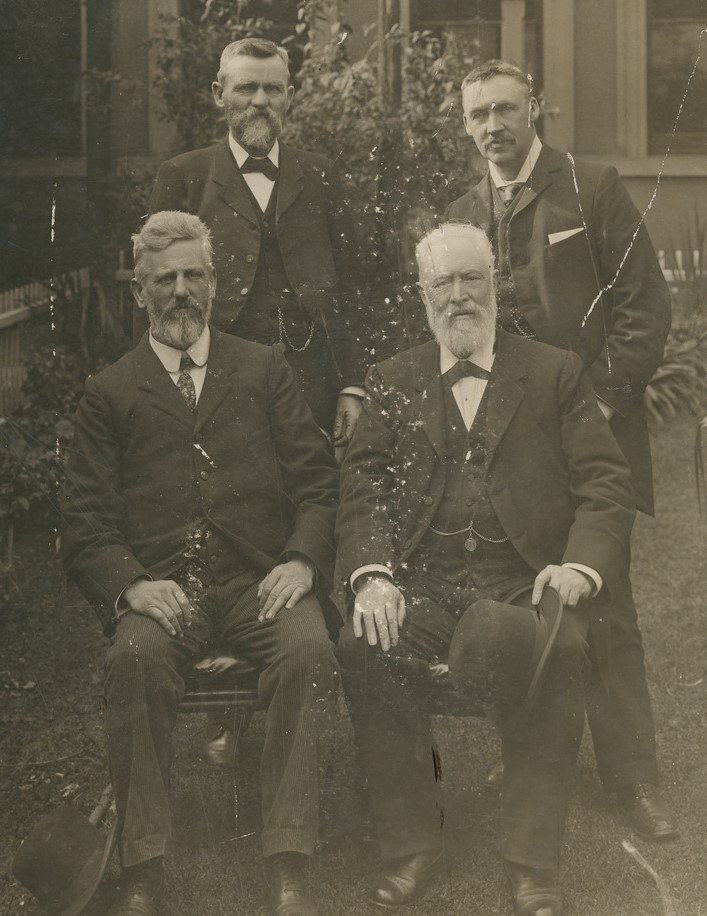
Price Ministry, c. 1905

Peake was elected to the South Australian House of Assembly as the Member for Albert representing Naracoorte. After his election, Peake was at first an independent supporting the Liberal Governments of Charles Kingston and Frederick Holder. He became disillusioned with the Government of John Jenkins leading him to become leader of a group of 15 members under the Liberal banner.

Peake was elected as one of three members for the new seat of Victoria and Albert in May 1902, he held this seat until March 1915. At the 1905 election Peake sought a Liberal-Labor alliance: 'the only difference between us is a difference of degree and of speed'. Peake's group entered into a coalition with the Labor minority government of Thomas Price, the Price-Peake administration, holding the positions of Treasurer of South Australia and Attorney-General of South Australia. As Treasurer, he delivered three surplus budgets in a row as agricultural conditions improved.

At the 1906 election, Labor came close to a majority in their own right. However, Peake and his party resisted a change to the arrangements and it was only his good relationships with Price that held the coalition together. Peake had formed the Liberal and Democratic Union (LDU) which had a network of branches in 1906.

== Premier ==
After Price's death, the Labor Party demanded the Premier position for its new leader John Verran. Peake refused and was able to form a Government which lasted for a year. The LDU relied on support from the two independent conservative parties, the Australasian National League (formerly National Defence League) and the Farmers and Producers Political Union with representatives of both parties joining the Government.

Labor was victorious, forming South Australia's first majority government at the 1910 election. In the same year, the LDU merged with the two independent conservative parties to form the Liberal Union under Peake's leadership. The parties readily approved the merger, however the LDU which salvaged the fewest of their principles from the merger were more hesitant. Peake persuaded a party conference that 'the day of the middle party is passed', and approved the merger by just one vote. The Liberal Union was affiliated with the federal Commonwealth Liberal Party. Peake was elected as Premier at the 1912 election as Verran's Government had been unable to deal with a number of significant industrial disputes.

Peake's Government created the Industrial arbitration court which established a minimum wage for state awards but limited the right to strike. During his premiership, he reached agreement with the Federal, New South Wales and Victorian Governments over the Murray River leading to the River Murray Commission which is now the Murray-Darling Basin Commission. Peake was a teetotaller Presbyterian who held a plebiscite establishing six o'clock closing for hotels in 1915 which became the law in South Australia for the next fifty years.

Peake lost to the Labor Party under Crawford Vaughan at the 1915 election and lost his seat. However, he was elected as Member for Alexandra and became Leader of the Opposition. Vaughan lost his majority after the Labor Party split over conscription. Peake became Premier of a coalition government of Liberal Union and National Labor members.

This government reformed apprenticeship arrangements and reformed divorce laws. It won a solid majority at the 1918 election and established soldier settlements. However, the National Party crossed the floor to amend the Industrial Code Bill in concert with the Labor Party leading Peake to demand their full support. They refused leading Peake to form a totally Liberal Government. However, he died of a cerebral haemorrhage hours after the new Ministry was sworn in.

== Notes ==
Parliament of South Australia
Preceded by George Ash	Member for Albert; 1897–1902; Served alongside: Andrew Handyside	District abolished
New district	Member for Victoria and Albert; 1902–1915; Served alongside: John Livingston, Donald Campbell, George Bodey, Andrew Handyside, William Senior, William Angus	District abolished
Preceded by Alexander McDonald	Member for Alexandra; 1915–1920; Served alongside: George Laffer, George Ritchie	Succeeded by Herbert Hudd
Political offices
Preceded by Richard Butler	Treasurer of South Australia; 1905–1909	Succeeded by Richard Butler
Preceded by Robert Homburg	Attorney-General of South Australia; 1905-1909	Succeeded by Samuel Mitchell
Preceded by Thomas Price	Premier of South Australia; 1909–1910	Succeeded by John Verran
Preceded by John Verran	Leader of the Opposition of South Australia; 1910–1912	Succeeded by John Verran
Preceded by John Verran	Premier of South Australia; 1912–1915	Succeeded by Crawford Vaughan
Preceded by Crawford Vaughan	Treasurer of South Australia; 1912–1915	Succeeded by Crawford Vaughan
Preceded by Crawford Vaughan	Leader of the Opposition of South Australia; 1915–1917	Succeeded by Crawford Vaughan
Preceded by Crawford Vaughan	Premier of South Australia; 1917–1920	Succeeded by Henry Barwell
Preceded by Henry Barwell	Attorney-General of South Australia; 1917-1918	Succeeded by Henry Barwell
Preceded by Richard Butler	Treasurer of South Australia; 1919–1920	Succeeded by George Ritchie
Party political offices
New political party	Leader of the Liberal and Democratic Union; 1906–1910	Party disbanded
New political party	Leader of the Liberal Union; 1910–1920	Succeeded by Henry Barwell
