= William Jamieson (Australian politician) =

Australian politician (1861–1912)

William Jamieson (11 September 1861 – 15 October 1912) was an Australian politician who represented the South Australian House of Assembly multi-member seats of Gumeracha from 1901 to 1902 and Murray and 1905 to 1912, representing the Australasian National League from 1901, the Liberal and Democratic Union from 1906, and the Liberal Union from 1910.

== See also ==
- Hundred of Jamieson
