= William Blacker (politician) =

Australian politician

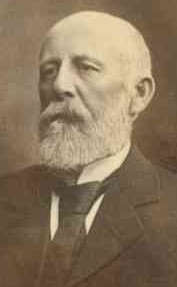

William James Blacker (30 May 1843 – 22 November 1913) was an Australian politician who represented the South Australian House of Assembly multi-member seats of Noarlunga from 1892 to 1902 and Alexandra from 1902 to 1913, representing the Liberal and Democratic Union from 1906 to 1910 and the Liberal Union from 1910 to 1913. He was colloquially known as "Old Bill Blacker".

== Biography ==
Blacker was born at Radstock, Somerset in the United Kingdom, and migrated to South Australia with his family in 1855. His family settled at Yankalilla, where he was educated. He farmed at Yankalilla for 16 years and, in 1871, took up his own farm at Willunga, which he held for the rest of his life. He also operated an auctioneering business for around thirty years, which he later sold to Bagot, Shakes & Lewis. He married Elizabeth Pomeroy in 1872 and had five sons and three daughters. James Blacker, Stanley Bruce Blacker, Amelia Ann Blacker, Minnie Blacker, Sydney Blacker, William Ross Blacker, Herbert James Blacker and Edith Blacker

He was heavily involved in Freemasonry: he was a member of the Order of Foresters from age 18 until his death, served as secretary of Court Aldinga for 28 years until his retirement in 1909, and held various positions with the Loyal Willunga Lodge and Manchester Unity. In public life, he was a member of the volunteer force at Yankalilla until its disbandment, was secretary of the local agricultural and horticultural society for more than twenty years, was a justice of the peace for thirty years, secretary to the agricultural bureau for six years, and was chairman of the Willunga School Board of Advice for eleven years. He was also active in local government, serving variously as a councillor, auditor and clerk of the District Council of Willunga.

He was elected to the House of Assembly in an 1892 by-election, and was re-elected in that seat three times, topping the poll on each occasion. When that seat was amalgamated with two others in 1902, he contested and won Alexandra and held it until his death. He was described as a "staunch liberal" and a member of the country grouping of members with Richard Butler and Archibald Peake. In parliament, he was a leading advocate of the construction of the Willunga railway line.

He died in office while visiting McLaren Flat in 1913, having been in poor health for some time. He was buried in the Willunga Anglican Cemetery. Upon his death, The Chronicle stated of Blacker that there were "few centres in the country in which Mr. Blacker was not well known and popular". The newspaper described Blacker as having "a ragged speaking style, and made no attempt at rhetoric, but he had a spontaneous eloquence which always ensured a hearing, and his utterances in the House were greatly enjoyed".
