= Constitution Act Amendment Act 1901 =

South Australian state legislation

The Constitution Act Amendment Act 1901, No. 779 of 1901, long title "An Act to amend the Constitution", was an act which amended the Constitution of South Australia. Its effect was to reduce the size of the Parliament of South Australia following the Federation of Australia.

The Constitution had been created by the Constitution Act 1856 and later amended by the Constitution Act Further Amendment Act 1881.

The new Act expired the Parliament on 31 March 1902, resulting in a full election for both houses of parliament. The new parliament would be smaller, with eighteen members of the Legislative Council and forty-two members in the House of Assembly.

Each electoral district would elect multiple members, but less than the sum of the members elected by the former electorates that had been merged, resulting in a smaller parliament overall. Legislative Councillors would serve for periods of a minimum of six years (three for half of the initial cohort), with half retiring at each election. Assembly terms were not changed. Elections for both houses would be held together.

The amendment also decreased the maximum size of the Cabinet from six to four and fixed a maximum salary for Cabinet members.

The legislation saw numerous amendments in both houses of parliament. The initial proposal had been to reduce the membership of the House to 32 and the Council to 16; however, this was altered as opposition in the House would have defeated the bill.

== House of Assembly districts ==
The thirteen districts to elect members of the House of Assembly were composed from the former assembly districts as follows:

Number	Name	Number of members	Former districts comprised into the new districts
1	Adelaide	4	East Adelaide, West Adelaide, North Adelaide
2	Port Adelaide	3	Port Adelaide, West Torrens
3	Torrens	5	East Torrens, Sturt
4	Victoria and Albert	3	Victoria, Albert
5	Alexandra	4	Mount Barker, Encounter Bay, Noarlunga
6	Murray	3	Onkaparinga, Gumeracha
7	Barossa	3	Barossa, Yatala
8	Wooroora	3	Light, Wooroora
9	Wallaroo	3	Wallaroo, Yorke Peninsula
10	Stanley	3	Gladstone, Stanley
11	Burra Burra	3	Frome, Burra
12	Flinders	3	Newcastle, Flinders
-	Northern Territory	2	Northern Territory

== Legislative Council districts ==
Each legislative council district comprised several divisions, each derived from the Assembly districts

Legislative Council district	Number of members	Assembly divisions
Central District	6	Adelaide, Port Adelaide, Torrens
Southern District	4	Victoria and Albert, Alexandra, Murray
North-Eastern District	4	Barossa, Wooroora, Wallaroo
Northern District	4	Stanley, Burra Burra, Flinders, Northern Territory
