= James Phillips Wilson =

Politician (1853–1925)

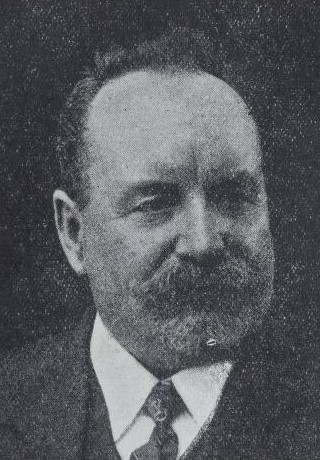

James Phillips Wilson (5 October 1853 – 6 July 1925) was a politician in South Australia.

== History ==
Wilson was born in Wales and was brought out to New South Wales around 1850 by his father, a miner. He was educated at Fort Street School, then was apprenticed to a bootmaker. He joined his father in several mining ventures, then travelled around the world, picking up work at every port to finance his travels. In 1902 he finished up in Adelaide, where he joined Labor. He became prominent in the trade union movement and was elected to the Legislative Council at the 1906 election, succeeding Joseph Vardon as representative of the Central district, a position he retained for 13 years. He was given the portfolio of Minister of Agriculture and Industry in the Verran Labor government, and did much to further mining in the State.

Following several protracted bouts of serious illness around late 1913 and early 1914, the Labor caucus pulled him as their party's representative on the Railways Standing Committee (which paid higher fees than any other committee) in favor of James Jelley. The Committee voted for Wilson to continue, so he withdrew his resignation, resulting in Wilson's expulsion from the United Labor Party after 12 years representing them in the Legislative Council. Some reports say he resigned from Labor. He later joined the National Party in the wake of the 1917 Labor split, and contested and lost the 1918 election on their behalf. By 1920, it was reported that he had left the National Party for the Liberal Union.

He died at his home in Prospect. He had never married.
