= Electoral district of Flinders =

South Australian state electoral district

Flinders South Australia—House of Assembly
- Interactive map of electoral district boundaries from the 2022 state election (Note: The electorate will have no change in boundaries at the 2026 state election.)
- State: South Australia
- Created: 1857
- MP: Sam Telfer
- Party: Liberal Party of Australia (SA)
- Namesake: Matthew Flinders
- Electors: 26,388 (2026)
- Area: 221,669 km^{2} (85,586.9 sq mi)
- Demographic: Rural and remote
Electorates around Flinders:
W. A.	Stuart	Giles
W. A.	Flinders	Narungga
Great Australian Bight	Great Australian Bight	Narungga

Flinders is a single-member electoral district for the South Australian House of Assembly. It is named after explorer Matthew Flinders, who was responsible for charting most of the state's coastline. It is a large coastal rural electorate encompassing the Eyre Peninsula and the coast along the Nullarbor Plain, based in and around the city of Port Lincoln and contains the District Councils of Ceduna, Cleve, Elliston, Lower Eyre Peninsula, Streaky Bay and Wudinna; as well as the localities of Fowlers Bay, Nullarbor and Yalata in the Pastoral Unincorporated Area.

== History ==
Flinders is the only one of the original 17 electorates to be contested at every election.

Flinders was also the name of an electoral district of the unicameral South Australian Legislative Council from 1851 until its abolition in 1857.

Created as a single-member electorate in 1857, it was a dual-member electorate 1862–1875, 1884–1902 and 1915–1938, and a three-member electorate 1875–1884 and 1902–1915.

A single-member electorate since 1938, it was held by Edward Craigie of the Single Tax League from 1938 to 1941. It has been in the hands of a conservative party–the Liberals (and their predecessors, the Liberal and Country League) or the Nationals–ever since. For most of that time, it has been safely conservative even by the standards of rural South Australia, although Labor came close to winning it with a 46.5 percent two-party-preferred vote at the 1962 election. Members have typically held the seat for 10 to 20 years.

The LCL/Liberal hold on the seat was broken in 1973 when Peter Blacker claimed the seat for the Nationals, then known as the Country Party. He held it until 1993, when Kangaroo Island was briefly redistributed to Flinders, allowing Liberal Liz Penfold to take the seat on a large swing of over 14 percent. Penfold actually won enough votes on the first count to win the seat outright. Blacker sought a rematch in 1997, after Kangaroo Island was removed. However, without the advantages of incumbency, Blacker not only lost, but suffered a further swing of three percent. The seat has reverted to form, and has been a comfortably safe Liberal seat ever since.

The seat was expanded in 2002 to include a western strip of land all the way to the Western Australia border.

== Members for Flinders ==
Member	Party	Term
Marshall MacDermott		1857–1859
W. J. Browne		1860–1862

Member	Party	Term	Member	Party	Term
Alfred Watts		1862–1866	Charles Lindsay		1862–1865
Alfred Watts		1862–1866	John Williams		1865–1868
Augustine Stow		1866–1868	John Williams		1865–1868
Alfred Watts		1868–1875	W. R. Mortlock		1868–1870
Alfred Watts		1868–1875	Hampton Gleeson		1870–1871
Alfred Watts		1868–1875	W. R. Mortlock		1871–1875

Member	Party	Term	Member	Party	Term	Member	Party	Term
P. B. Coglin		1875–1881	John Williams		1875–1878	Ebenezer Cooke		1875–1882
P. B. Coglin		1875–1881	W. R. Mortlock		1878–1884	Ebenezer Cooke		1875–1882
Andrew Tennant		1881–1884	W. R. Mortlock		1878–1884	Ebenezer Cooke		1875–1882
Andrew Tennant		1881–1884	W. R. Mortlock		1878–1884	P. B. Coglin		1882–1884

Member	Party	Term	Member	Party	Term
Andrew Tennant		1884–1887	John Moule		1884–1896
William Horn		1887–1893	John Moule		1884–1896
Alexander Poynton	Labor	1893–1901	John Moule		1884–1896
Alexander Poynton	Labor	1893–1901	W. T. Mortlock		1896–1899
Alexander Poynton	Labor	1893–1901	David McKenzie		1899–1902
W. T. Mortlock		1901–1902	David McKenzie		1899–1902

Member	Party	Term	Member	Party	Term	Member	Party	Term
Richard Foster	National League	1902–1904	David McKenzie		1902–1905	Thomas Burgoyne	National League	1902–1904
Richard Foster	Farmers and Producers	1904–1906	David McKenzie		1902–1905	Thomas Burgoyne	Farmers and Producers	1904–1906
Richard Foster	Farmers and Producers	1904–1906	A. H. Inkster		1905–1906	Thomas Burgoyne	Farmers and Producers	1904–1906
John Travers	Liberal and Democratic	1906–1910	A. H. Inkster	Liberal and Democratic	1906–1907	Thomas Burgoyne	Liberal and Democratic	1906–1910
John Travers	Liberal and Democratic	1906–1910	E. H. Warren	Farmers and Producers	1907–1910	Thomas Burgoyne	Liberal and Democratic	1906–1910
James O'Loghlin	Labor	1910–1912	James Moseley	Liberal Union	1910–1915	Thomas Burgoyne	Liberal Union	1910–1915
John Travers	Liberal Union	1912–1915	James Moseley	Liberal Union	1910–1915	Thomas Burgoyne	Liberal Union	1910–1915

Member	Party	Term	Member	Party	Term
John Travers	Liberal Union	1915–1918	James Moseley	Liberal Union	1915–1923
John Chapman	Country	1918–1924	James Moseley	Liberal Union	1915–1923
John Chapman	Country	1918–1924	James Moseley	Liberal Federation	1923–1932
John O'Connor	Labor	1924–1927	James Moseley	Liberal Federation	1923–1932
Edward Coles	Country Party	1927–1928	James Moseley	Liberal Federation	1923–1932
Edward Coles	Liberal Federation	1928–1930	James Moseley	Liberal Federation	1923–1932
Edward Craigie	Single Tax	1930–1938	James Moseley	Liberal Federation	1923–1932
Edward Craigie	Single Tax	1930–1938	James Moseley	Liberal and Country	1932–1933
Edward Craigie	Single Tax	1930–1938	Arthur Christian	Liberal and Country	1933–1938

Member	Party	Term
Edward Craigie	Single Tax	1938–1941
Rex Pearson	Liberal and Country	1941–1951
Glen Pearson	Liberal and Country	1951–1970
John Carnie	Liberal and Country	1970–1973
Peter Blacker	Nationals SA	1973–1993
Liz Penfold	Liberal	1993–2010
Peter Treloar	Liberal	2010–2022
Sam Telfer	Liberal	2022–present

== Election results ==
2026 South Australian state election: Flinders
Party	Candidate	Votes	%	±%
Liberal	Sam Telfer	7,232	33.8	−12.2
One Nation	Brenton Hincks	6,042	28.2	+28.2
Independent	Meghan Petherick	2,870	13.4	+13.4
Labor	Ben Anchor	1,959	9.2	−4.7
Independent	Craig Haslam	1,190	5.6	+5.6
Greens	Kathryn Hardwick-Franco	760	3.6	−1.2
National	Dylan Cowley	460	2.1	−2.0
Independent	Rod Keogh	308	1.4	+1.4
SA-Best	Thomas McNab	257	1.2	+1.2
Australian Family	Sam Fulwood	175	0.8	+0.8
Real Change	Spiro Manolakis	145	0.7	+0.7
Total formal votes		21,400	93.8	−3.0
Informal votes		1,425	6.2	+3.0
Turnout		22,825	86.5	−0.7
Two-candidate-preferred result
Liberal	Sam Telfer	12,762	59.6	+6.6
One Nation	Brenton Hincks	8,636	40.4	+40.4
Liberal hold				
