= Alexander McDonald (South Australian politician) =

Australian politician (1849–1922)

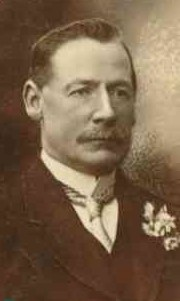
McDonald in 1902

Alexander McDonald (6 February 1849 – 10 April 1922) was an Australian politician who represented the South Australian House of Assembly multi-member seats of Noarlunga from 1887 to 1902 and Alexandra from 1902 to 1915. He represented the Australasian National League from 1893 to 1910 and the Liberal Union from 1910 until 1915.

Born at a distillery at Kirkwall in the Orkney Islands, McDonald migrated to South Australia in 1851, per Lysander. After working on farms for several years, he took up shopkeeping, first in Adelaide and later Blackwood.
