= Ivor MacGillivray =

Australian politician

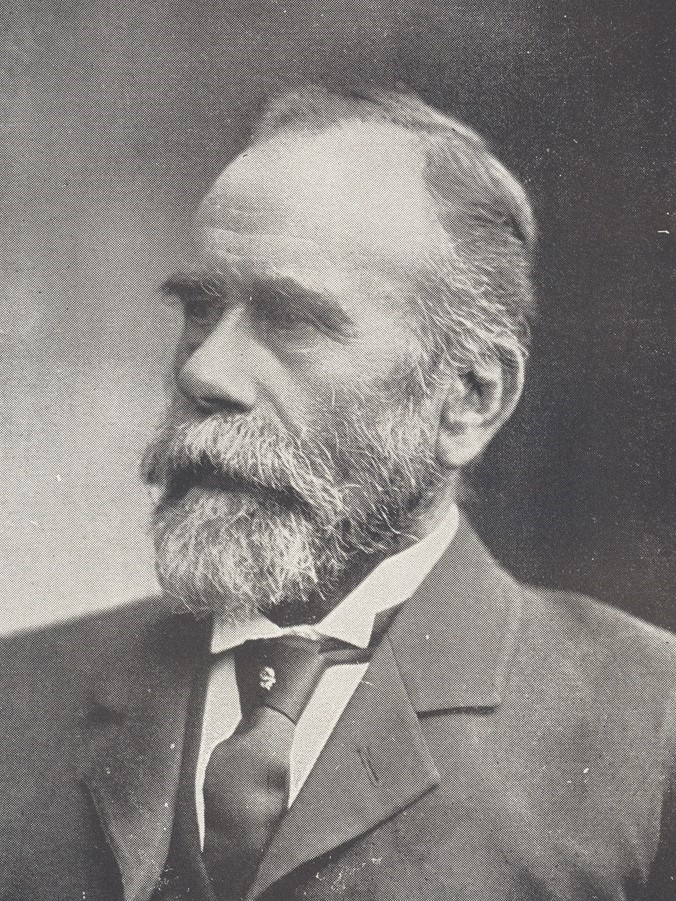

Member of the South Australian House of Assembly for Port Adelaide
- In office 1893–1918

Ivor MacGillivray (24 May 1840 – 16 January 1939) was an Australian politician who represented the South Australian House of Assembly multi-member seat of Port Adelaide from 1893 to 1918. He was a member of the United Labor Party until the 1917 Labor split, when he joined the splinter National Party.

MacGillivray was born at Lossiemouth in Scotland. He worked on a farm as a boy, and later worked as a seaman between China and Australia, in the Black Sea and Mediterranean. At 19, he left the ship in Melbourne, spent two years at the Bendigo gold rushes, before leaving for the gold rushes in Otago, New Zealand, where he spent a further twelve years. He returned to Melbourne, briefly went to England, and worked as a prospector in Western Australia and South Australia before settling in Adelaide. He worked as a coal lumper at Port Adelaide for 20 years, and was chairman of the Working Men's Association for 16 years. He was one of the local leaders of the 1890 Australian maritime dispute.

MacGillivray was elected to the House of Assembly at the 1893 state election. He was expelled from the Labor Party in the 1917 Labor split over his support for conscription in World War I; his son had been killed in the Gallipoli Campaign. MacGillivray recontested Port Adelaide for the splinter National Party, but was defeated by John Stanley Verran.

He retired following the loss of his parliamentary seat in 1918. MacGillivray died at the Adelaide Hospital in 1939, aged 98, following a fall in his home. He was buried at Cheltenham Cemetery.
