= Alfred Edwin Winter =

Australian politician

Alfred Winter
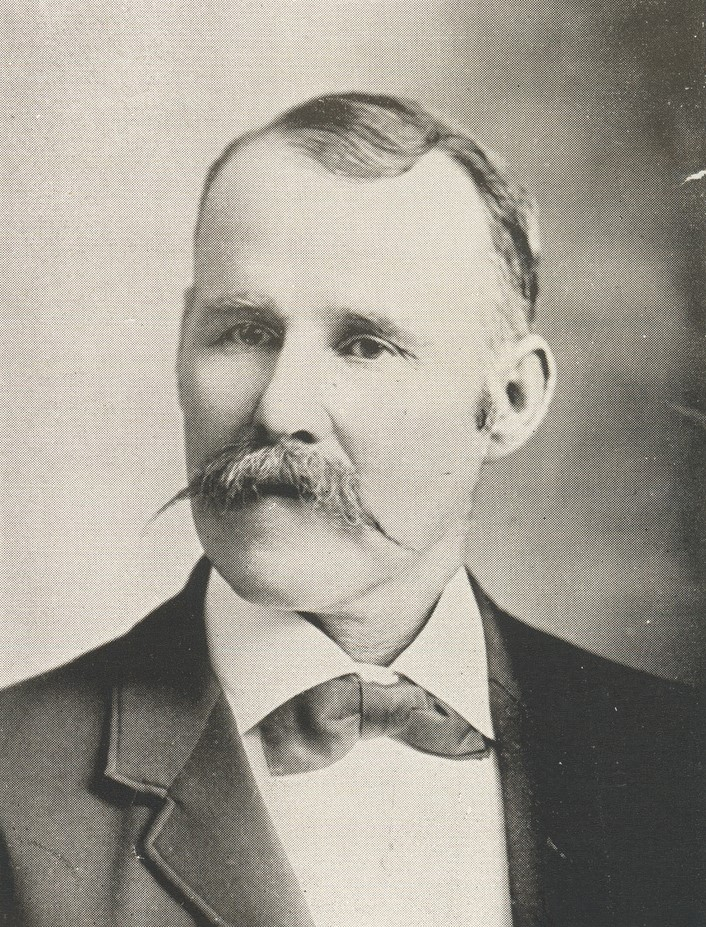

Member of the South Australian House of Assembly
- In office 27 May 1905 – 9 February 1912 Serving with: Peter Allen; John Verran
- Preceded by: John Shannon
- Succeeded by: J. A. Southwood
- Parliamentary group: United Labor
- Constituency: Wallaroo

Personal details
- Born: Alfred Edwin Winter; 18 November 1862 Macclesfield, South Australia
- Died: 11 June 1939 (aged 76) Richmond, South Australia
- Spouse: Jane Shepherd (m. 1888)
- Children: 2

Alfred Edwin Winter (18 November 1862 – 11 June 1939) was an Australian politician who represented the multi-member seat of Wallaroo in the South Australian House of Assembly from 1905 to 1912 for the United Labor Party.

Winter was the third son and eighth child of state school teacher Augustus Winter. He was born at Macclesfield, South Australia, and was taught by his father at the school at Moonta. He started his working life aged 12, apprenticed as a grocer's assistant in Hindmarsh. After four years, he went to work on his uncle's farm on Yorke Peninsula. Following five years of drought, Winter returned to Adelaide to work as a porter at Adelaide railway station. He later worked at the Broken Hill mines as a rate collector, then at Macumba Station and in the Telegraph Department at William Creek for five years before returning to Adelaide again. He conducted business there but a year later went to Wallaroo to work for the Wallaroo and Moonta Mining Company, where he remained until elected to parliament in 1905. He married Jane Shepherd from Balaklava in 1888. They had two sons.

Winter was first elected in 1905. He did not seek re-election for a fourth term at the 1912 election.

Following parliament, Winter lived on his farm at Port Clinton for 26 years and retired to Richmond only two years before his death. He was survived by his wife and two sons.
