= Donald Campbell (Australian politician) =

Australian politician

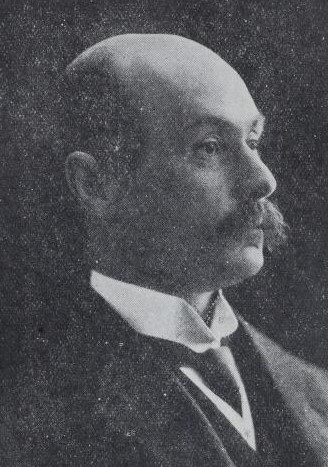

Donald Campbell (16 September 1866 – 21 October 1945) was an Australian politician who represented the South Australian House of Assembly multi-member seat of Victoria and Albert from 1906 to 1912 for the United Labor Party.
