= Arthur Hugh Inkster =

Australian politician

Arthur Hugh Inkster (4 May 1866 – 29 March 1907) was an Australian politician who represented the South Australian House of Assembly multi-member seat of Flinders from 1905 to 1907, joining the Liberal and Democratic Union in 1906.
