= Farmers and Producers Political Union =

- Founded: 1904
- Dissolved: 1910
- Merged into: Liberal Union

The Farmers and Producers Political Union (FPPU) was an independent conservative agrarian political party founded in South Australia in reaction to Labor, keen to fend off a perceived threat to the FPPU's interests against a rising labour movement and Labor. The rural stockowners and graziers were concerned at the concentration of the Australasian National League (ANL) on the metropolitan electorates and urban issues, leading to the formation of the FPPU which had a conservative political agenda, and was absolutely opposed to franchise reform. It was essentially the rural wing of the ANL. The FPPU was created in 1904 and lasted until after the 1910 election when it merged with the Liberal and Democratic Union and the National Defence League to become the Liberal Union.

On their own the FPPU won an 8.8 percent vote at both the 1905 and 1906 election, winning nine and five seats respectively.

== See also ==
- Members of the South Australian House of Assembly, 1905–1906
- Members of the South Australian House of Assembly, 1906–1910
- Members of the South Australian House of Assembly, 1910–1912
- Members of the South Australian Legislative Council, 1910–1912
