= Thomas Price (South Australian politician) =

Australian politician

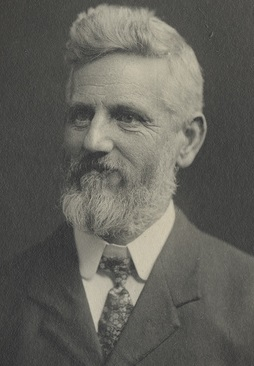

Premier of South Australia
- In office 26 July 1905 – 31 May 1909
- Monarch: Edward VII
- Governor: Sir George Le Hunte; Sir Day Bosanquet
- Preceded by: Richard Butler
- Succeeded by: Archibald Peake

Leader of the Opposition in South Australia
- In office 15 July 1904 – 26 July 1905
- Preceded by: John Darling
- Succeeded by: Richard Butler

Leader of the United Labor Party
- In office 12 December 1899 – 31 May 1909
- Preceded by: Lee Batchelor
- Succeeded by: John Verran

Member of the South Australian House of Assembly
- In office 21 April 1887 – 31 May 1909
- Preceded by: Josiah Symon
- Succeeded by: George Dankel
- Constituency: Sturt (1887–1902); Torrens (1902–1909)

Personal details
- Born: Thomas Price; 19 January 1852 Brymbo, Wales, United Kingdom
- Died: 31 May 1909 (aged 57) Mount Lofty, South Australia
- Party: United Labor Party

Thomas Price (19 January 1852 – 31 May 1909) served as the South Australian United Labor Party's first Premier of South Australia. He formed a minority government at the 1905 election and was re-elected with increased representation at the 1906 election, serving in the premiership until his death in 1909. It was the world's first stable Labor government. Shortly afterwards, John Verran led Labor to form the state's first of many majority governments at the 1910 election.

Achievements of the Price government included free state secondary schools, the formation of wages boards and a minimum wage, establishing the Municipal Tramways Trust through nationalisation, the costly administration of the Northern Territory was surrendered to the Federal government, and reform (though limited) of the upper house. The government also attained successive budget surpluses and reduced the accumulated public debt.

== Early life ==
Tom Price was born in Brymbo, Denbighshire, Wales in 1852 to John and Jane Price. His family moved to Liverpool in 1853 where Tom grew up. Tom Price emigrated to South Australia with his family in 1883. He was a stonecutter, teacher, lay preacher, businessman, stonemason and clerk-of-works. As a stonemason, Price helped to build the Parliament House of South Australia, a building he would later serve in as an elected politician.

== Political career ==
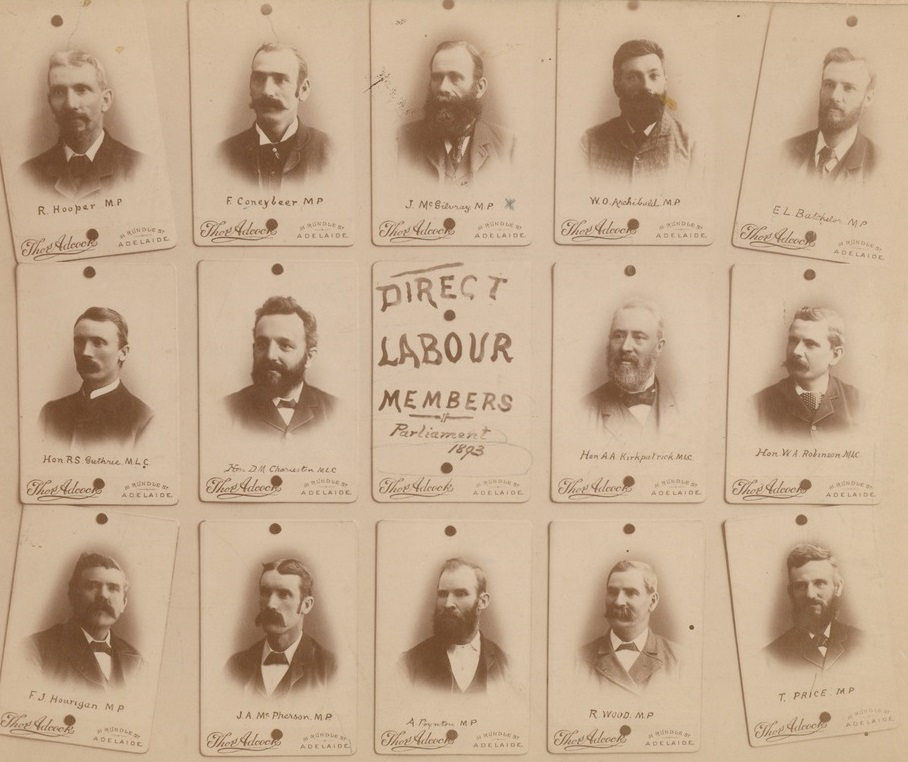
ULP parliamentarians following the 1893 colonial election.

Price quickly became involved in trade union activity, and was elected to the South Australian House of Assembly for Sturt in April 1893, becoming Labor leader in 1899. He contested the single statewide Division of South Australia at the 1901 federal election as the second of two Labor candidates behind Lee Batchelor. The seat elected seven members, Price finished eighth with a 38.2 percent vote.

== World-first stable Labor government 1905−1909 ==
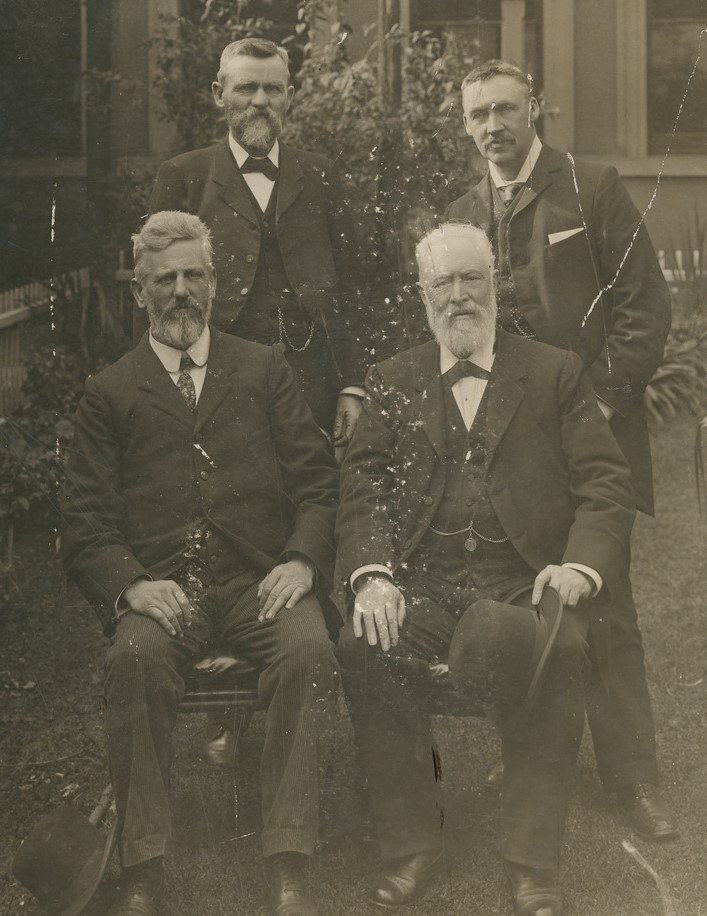
Price Ministry, c. 1905

Price came to power at the 1905 state election in a minority government, the Price-Peake administration, after increasing his party's representation from five to 15 in the 42-member lower house, with a primary vote of 41.3 percent, an increase of 22.2 percent. With the support of eight liberals headed by Archibald Peake, Price forced conservative Premier Richard Butler to resign. Price retained the premiership at the 1906 double dissolution election with an additional five Labor seats in the House of Assembly, just two short of a parliamentary majority in their own right, with a primary vote of 44.8 percent, an increase of 3.5 percent. It was the world's first stable Labor government, and was so successful that, following the 1910 election, Labor, led by John Verran, formed the first of the state's many majority governments. On Price's death in 1909, Peake formed a minority government until 1910.

Price introduced many reforms, including free state secondary schools, the formation of wages boards, the institution of a minimum wage, and the establishment of the Municipal Tramways Trust through nationalisation. The costly administration of the Northern Territory was surrendered to the Federal government, and there was limited reform of the Legislative Council. Price obtained a double dissolution on the issue of the reform of the upper house. Nevertheless, the Council continued to be intransigent regarding its reform, and Price accepted its compromise proposal of a £17 householder franchise. Labor's left wing criticised him for the concession.

The Price Government enacted a number of laws relating to social matters: the suppression of brothels and gaming, the control and care of drunkards, and the consolidation of legislation on the supply of alcohol and local option in liquor licensing. The government also achieved successive budget surpluses and reduced the accumulated public debt.

== Legacy ==
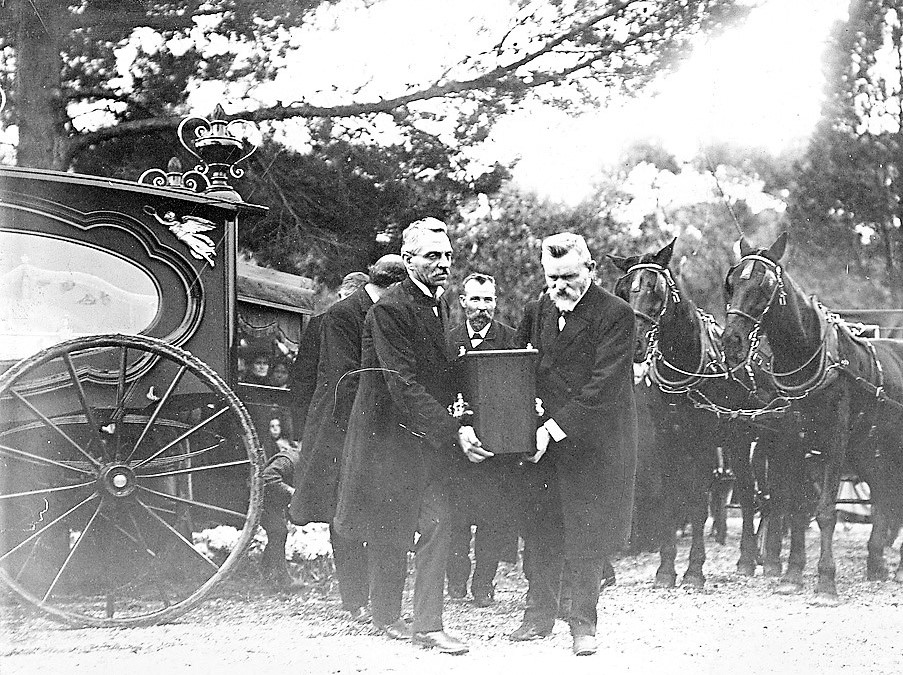
Funeral of Thomas Price

Price suffered from diabetes but died from tuberculosis of the throat or lungs at Mount Lofty on 31 May 1909. He was given a State funeral and buried at Mitcham Cemetery.

An island of the Whidby Group off the south-west coast of Eyre Peninsula had been left unnamed after Matthew Flinders' early explorations. It was named Price Island by the Government of South Australia in his honour. A guiding light for mariners was also erected on the island.

In 2015 a biography of Thomas Price was published and the book launch was attended by South Australian politicians from both sides of politics. At the launch, Premier Jay Weatherill labelled Price "a Labor hero".

In 2019, one hundred and ten years after Price's death, a plaque was officially placed at Brownhill Creek Recreation Park in his honour.

== Personal life ==
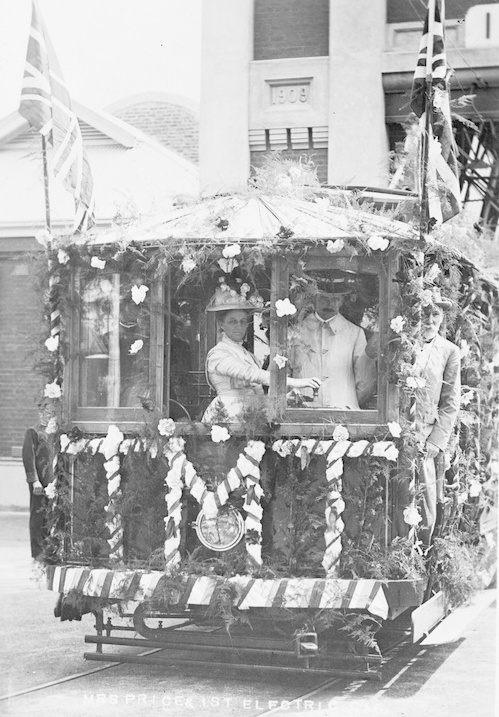
Anne Price starting the first car of the first Adelaide electric tramway system, Hackney Depot 9 March 1909.

Price married Anne Elizabeth Lloyd (c.1860 – 1 September 1950) on 14 April 1881 at St David's Welsh Church of England in Liverpool. Anne played an active role in Price's election campaigns She was a member of the Woman's Christian Temperance Union for many years.

After Price's death, Anne was one of four women appointed a Justice of the Peace in 1915, the first in Australia. She considered her duties as a JP an important privilege. She was invited to sit on the Bench, in an unofficial capacity, at the local court by the commissioner James George Russell, and she was the first woman to do so. Due to an accident while on a trip to Britain, Anne withdrew from taking an active part in public life in 1925.

Price and Ann had seven children.

- John Lloyd Price (14 February 1882 – 23 April 1941) MHA for Port Adelaide 1915–1925 and MHR.
- Edward Hugh Price (1884–1954), engineer with the Harbors Board
- Walter Davies Price MC (24 March 1886 – 29 July 1944) distinguished soldier and public servant.
- (Thomas) Arthur Price (1888–1942), a railways employee,
- Annie Mary "Ann" Price (1890–1985), married Ernest A. Pengelley in 1914 in Brisbane.
- Ada Olive "Olive" Price (1891–1952) married Horace Wicks in 1915.
- Florence Gwendoline "Flo" Price (1894–1957) married Alfred Charles Clarke in 1920.

Tom Price was an active Methodist and Freemason.

Political offices
Preceded by John Darling Jr.	Leader of the Opposition of South Australia; 1904–1905	Succeeded by Richard Butler
Preceded by Richard Butler	Premier of South Australia; 1905–1909	Succeeded by Archibald Peake
Preceded by Richard Foster	Commissioner of Public Works; 1905 – 1909	Succeeded by Laurence O'Loughlin
Parliament of South Australia
Preceded by William Stock	Member for Sturt; 1893–1902; Served alongside: John Jenkins	District abolished
New district	Member for Torrens; 1902–1909; Served alongside: John Jenkins	Succeeded by Thomas Ryan
Party political offices
Preceded by Lee Batchelor	Leader of the United Labor Party; 1899–1909	Succeeded by John Verran
