= John Verran =

Australian politician (1856–1932)

The Honourable John Verran
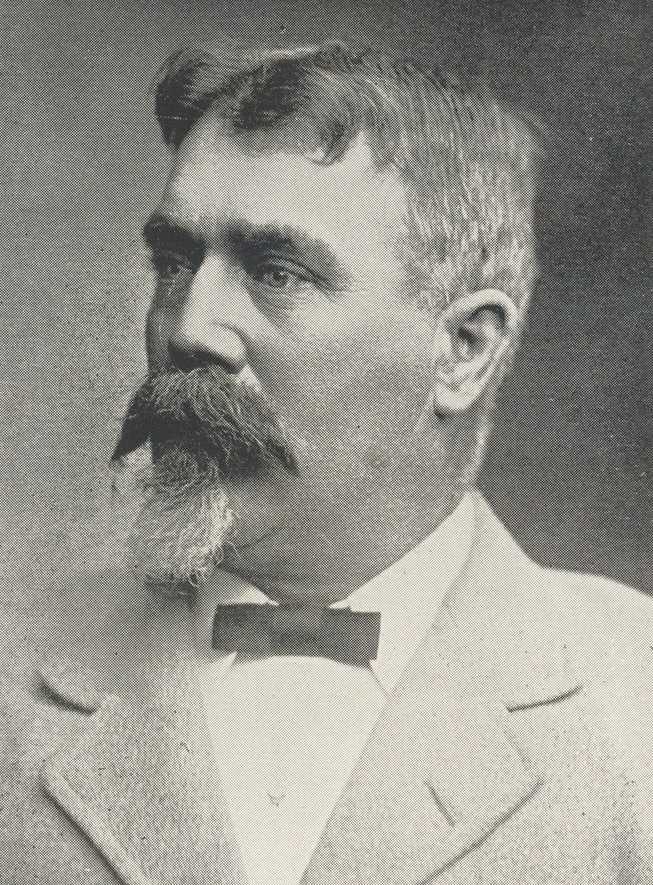

26th Premier of South Australia
- In office 3 June 1910 – 17 February 1912
- Monarch: George V
- Governor: Sir Day Bosanquet
- Preceded by: Archibald Peake
- Succeeded by: Archibald Peake

Leader of the Opposition in South Australia
- In office 17 February 1912 – 26 July 1913
- Preceded by: Archibald Peake
- Succeeded by: Crawford Vaughan
- In office 5 June 1909 – 3 June 1910
- Preceded by: Richard Butler
- Succeeded by: Archibald Peake

Leader of the United Labor Party
- In office 1909 – 26 July 1913
- Preceded by: Thomas Price
- Succeeded by: Crawford Vaughan

Senator for South Australia
- In office 30 August 1927 – 16 November 1928
- Preceded by: Charles McHugh

Personal details
- Born: 9 July 1856 Gwennap, Cornwall, England
- Died: 7 June 1932 (aged 75) Unley, South Australia, Australia
- Party: Labor (to 1917); National (1917–1918); Independent (1921); Liberal (1924); Nationalist (1927–1928)
- Spouse: Catherine Trembath (m. 1880; died 1914)
- Children: 8

John Verran (9 July 1856 – 7 June 1932) was an Australian politician and trade unionist. He served as premier of South Australia from 1910 to 1912, the second member of the Australian Labor Party (ALP) to hold the position.

Verran was born in Cornwall, England and arrived in Australia as a young child. He began working in the copper mines at Moonta as a young boy and eventually became president of the local miners' union. He was elected to the South Australian House of Assembly in 1901 as a member of the United Labor Party, the predecessor of the current ALP. Verran was chosen as the party's leader in 1909, following the death of Thomas Price, and won a majority at the 1910 state election. His agenda was hampered by the obstructionist Legislative Council and the government was defeated in 1912. He resigned as leader in 1913 and left the party following the split of 1916, losing his seat in 1918. After several unsuccessful candidacies for non-Labor parties he was chosen to fill a casual vacancy in the Senate from 1927 to 1928, sitting as a Nationalist.

== Early life ==
Verran was born at Gwennap, Cornwall in England, on 9 July 1856. The family lived at Kapunda, South Australia, until he was eight, and then moved to Moonta where copper had been discovered in 1861.

Verran learned to read with encouragement from the ministers of the Primitive Methodist church at Moonta. Verran was an active member and local preacher in the Primitive Methodist church, and later recognised this influence with the comment "I am an M.P., because I am a P.M."

Verran married Catherine Trembath in Moonta on 21 February 1880. They had eight children together before she died in 1914.

== State parliament ==
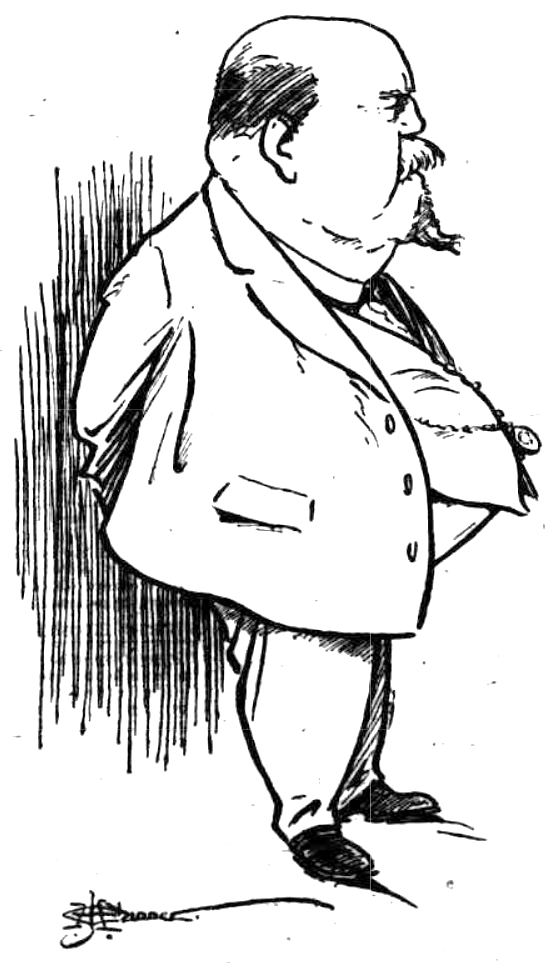
Caricature by John Henry Chinner

In 1901 he was elected a member of the South Australian House of Assembly in a by-election for Wallaroo, having been defeated for the seat at the 1896 and 1899 elections. On the death of Premier Thomas Price in 1909, Verran became Labor leader. Labor demanded the Premier position for Verran, however LDU leader Archibald Peake refused which saw Peake form a one-year government. The following year, Verran led Labor to South Australia's first majority government in the House of Assembly at the 1910 election, with Labor on a primary vote of 49.1 percent and 22 of 42 seats, less than two weeks before Labor formed Australia's first elected federal majority government and first elected Senate majority at the 1910 federal election.

On 3 June 1910 Verran became Premier, and was also commissioner of public works and minister of mines and of water-supply. Lasting less than 21 months, the government faced riots due to a drivers' strike in Adelaide streets, and criticism of how Verran handled the problem. Considerable sums were spent on railways and harbours. The Advances for Homes Act 1911 allowed the State Bank of South Australia to grant loans to poorer people, but the Legislative Council would not support the government attempts to create state brickyards and timber mills. Relations between the assembly and the council were strained, with Verran petitioning the British parliament to veto the council's decision. Verran called a 1912 election over the power of the upper house to veto the lower, however Labor suffered a swing against them, and were left with 16 of 40 seats.

During his premiership, Verran's government acted to make home ownership more possible for those in need, while the plight of Aborigines was tackled. More negatively, Verran introduced the Aborigines Bill in 1910 which revealed the ignorance and racism of white attitudes towards Australia's indigenous people at the time, and was a member of the Royal Commission on Aborigines (1912–1916). As a backbencher during World War I, Verran was supported by the All-British League in leading a campaign against people of German descent. He sought to close all Lutheran schools, disenfranchise (remove the right to vote from) people of German origin or birth and demand that Lutheran children "be taught pure English, and taught by those who are British, and taught what it is to be British".

Verran was succeeded as leader of the Labor Party by Crawford Vaughan in 1913, and Verran broke with the party in 1917 over the conscription issue. In 1918, he stood as a National Party candidate and was defeated. He stood as an independent in 1921 and a Liberal in 1924, also without success.

== Federal parliament ==
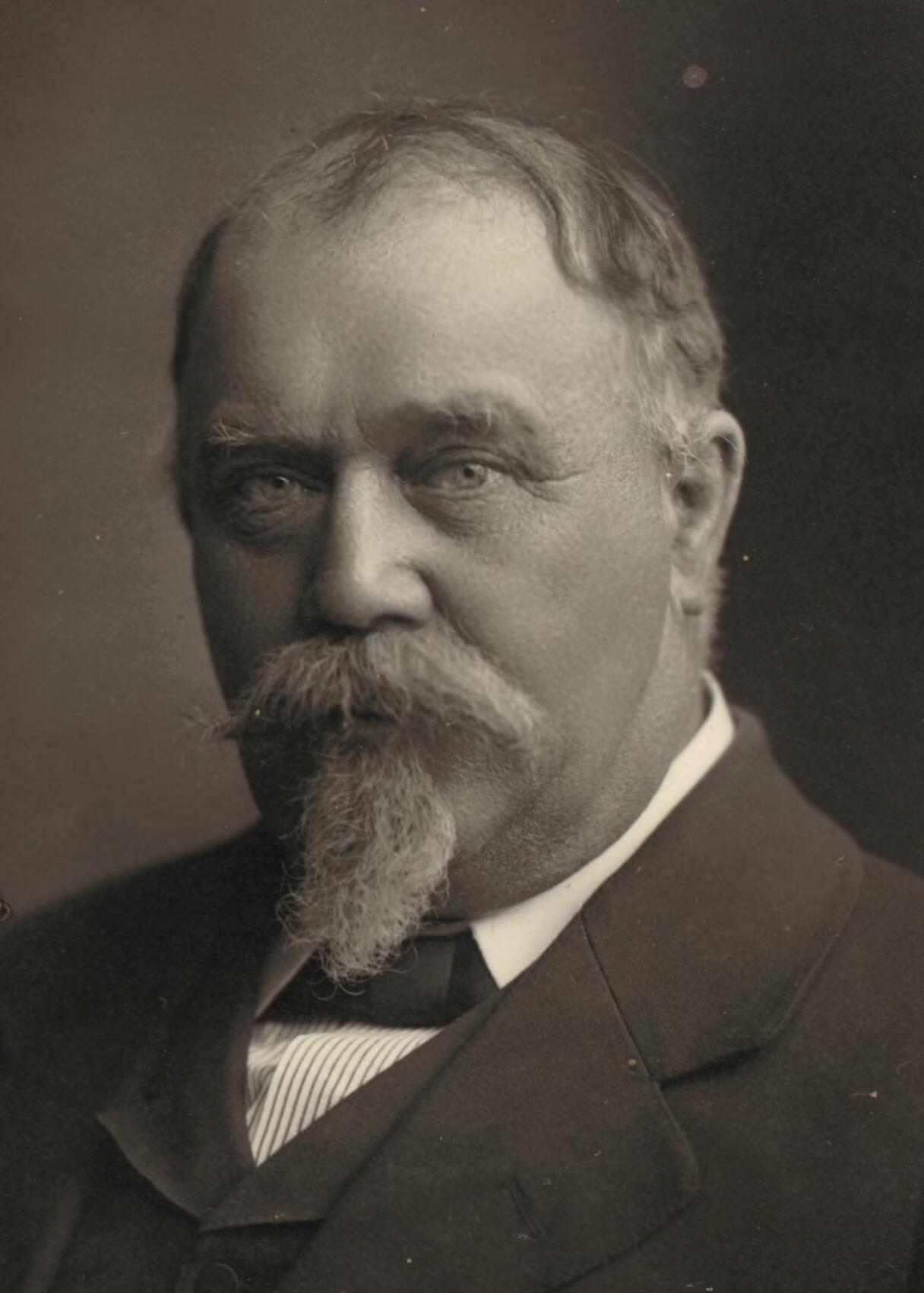
Verran in 1927

Verran stood unsuccessfully as a Nationalist candidate for the Senate at the 1922 federal election and for the House of Representatives seat of Hindmarsh at the 1925 election.

On 30 August 1927, aged 71, Verran was elected by state parliament to fill a casual vacancy caused by the death of ALP senator Charles McHugh. After taking his seat he spoke frequently on industrial relations and intergovernmental matters. He supported the Bruce–Page government's proposed amendments to the Commonwealth Conciliation and Arbitration Act 1904 and proposed introduction of secret ballots to decide strikes. Despite his background, Verran's rhetoric became increasingly anti-union, describing militant unionists as "responsible for much of our present troubles" and unions in general as "infernal political fighting machines". He also reluctantly supported the 1927 financial agreement between the federal government and the states, although stating "I never have been a federalist [...] indeed, I fought against federation, because, in my opinion, federation means the damnation of any country".

Verran was defeated at the 1928 election after just over a year in the Senate.

== Later life ==
He died at his daughter's home in Unley and was given a state funeral. He was buried at Moonta.

== See also ==
- Verran Ministry
- Hundred of Verran

Political offices
Preceded by Richard Butler	Leader of the Opposition of South Australia; 1909–1910	Succeeded by Archibald Peake
Preceded by Archibald Peake	Premier of South Australia; 1910 – 1912	Succeeded by Archibald Peake
Preceded by Laurence O'Loughlin	Commissioner of Public Works; 1910 – 1912	Succeeded by Richard Butler
Preceded by Archibald Peake	Leader of the Opposition of South Australia; 1912–1913	Succeeded by Crawford Vaughan
South Australian House of Assembly
Preceded by Henry Grainger	Member for Wallaroo; 1901–1917; Served alongside: Richard Hooper, Peter Allen, John Herbert, John Shannon, Alfred Winter, John Southwood	Succeeded by John Pedler
Party political offices
Preceded by Thomas Price	Leader of the United Labor Party; 1909 – 1913	Succeeded by Crawford Vaughan
