= Liberal and Democratic Union =

- Historic leaders: Archibald Peake
- Founded: 1906
- Dissolved: 1910
- Merged into: Liberal Union

The Liberal and Democratic Union (LDU) was a South Australian political party formed by early liberals, as opposed to the conservatives. It was formed in 1906 when liberal party structures were becoming more solid. Its leader, Archibald Peake, stressed that the LDU represented 'something not so sharply set as Labourism, not so dull in its edge as conservatism'. But with Labor taking over the middle ground, Kingstonian liberals like Peake had to choose.

At the 1905 election, Peake sought a Liberal alliance with Price Labor: 'the only difference between us is a difference of degree and of speed'. The Price-Peake administration was formed. At the 1906 election, the LDU won 10 percent of the vote and nine of 42 seats and continued to support the Price Labor government.

When Price died in 1909, Labor as the largest single party in the lower house demanded it retain the premiership in their coalition, however Peake refused. Invited to form a ministry, he filled it with LDU members and became premier, treasurer and minister of education. The ministry survived with the parliamentary support of two independent conservative parties, the Australasian National League (formerly National Defence League) and the Farmers and Producers Political Union, and in December was reconstructed to include members of both.

John Verran led Labor to South Australia's first majority government with 22 of 42 seats from a 49.1 percent primary vote at the 1910 election. The three anti-Labor parties endorsed a shared "Liberal" slate of candidates, winning a combined 20 of 42 seats from a 49.6 percent combined primary vote. Later in 1910 after the election, the parties merged and formed the Liberal Union with Peake as leader. The parties readily approved the merger, however, the LDU which salvaged the fewest of their principles from the merger were more hesitant. Peake persuaded a party conference that 'the day of the middle party is passed', and approved the merger by just one vote.

== See also ==
- Members of the South Australian House of Assembly, 1906–1910
- Members of the South Australian House of Assembly, 1910–1912
- Members of the South Australian Legislative Council, 1910–1912
