= National Defence League (Australia) =

- Founded: 1891
- Dissolved: 1910
- Merged into: Liberal Union

The National Defence League (NDL) was an independent conservative political party, founded in 1891 by MLC Richard Baker in South Australia as an immediate response to the perceived threat from Labor. Though subsumed with the National Association and other entities into the Australasian National League (ANL) in 1896, it was still often referred to by its former name. It lasted until the 1910 election, after which it merged with the Liberal and Democratic Union and the Farmers and Producers Political Union to become the Liberal Union.

The NDL, composed of Adelaide businessmen, professional men and pastoralists, organised to oppose: Labor and the United Trades and Labour Council, perceived socialism, increased suffrage, the eight-hour day, state conciliation and arbitration, and a single tax. The NDL stood for 'the preservation of law, order and property' and was opposed to 'all undue class influence in Parliament'.

The party's highest vote was 30.6 percent at the 1896 election. The highest number of seats won by the party was 20 (37% of seats) at the 1893 election. Its highest proportion was 17 of 42 seats (40.5% of seats) at the 1902 election.

Many candidates and MPs received election endorsement only rather than being chosen as an official candidate.

The current South Australian Division of the Liberal Party of South Australia claims on its website that the party originated with the NDL.

== See also ==
- Members of the South Australian House of Assembly, 1893–1896
- Members of the South Australian House of Assembly, 1896–1899
- Members of the South Australian House of Assembly, 1899–1902
- Members of the South Australian House of Assembly, 1902–1905
- Members of the South Australian House of Assembly, 1905–1906
- Members of the South Australian House of Assembly, 1906–1910
- Members of the South Australian House of Assembly, 1910–1912
