= Members of the South Australian House of Assembly, 1899–1902 =

This is a list of members of the South Australian House of Assembly from 1899 to 1902, as elected at the 1899 colonial election:

The Federation of Australia occurred on 1 January 1901, resulting in South Australia changing from a colony to a state of the new nation during this term of parliament. Seven members of the House of Assembly were elected to the new Parliament of Australia at the 1901 federal election, resulting in by-elections for their state seats.

Name	Party	Electorate	Term of office
William Archibald	Labor	Port Adelaide	1893–1910
Lee Batchelor ^{[4]}	Labor	West Adelaide	1893–1901
William Blacker		Noarlunga	1892–1913
Thomas Henry Brooker		West Torrens	1890–1905
Richard Butler		Yatala	1890–1924
Thomas Burgoyne		Newcastle	1884–1915
Robert Caldwell	ANL	Onkaparinga	1884–1902
William Carpenter	Labor	Encounter Bay	1896–1902
John William Castine	ANL	Wooroora	1884–1902
Hon Alfred Catt		Gladstone	1881–1906
Hon Sir Jenkin Coles		Light	1875–1878, 1881–1911
E. H. Coombe ^{[6]}	Labor	Barossa	1901–1912, 1915–1917
Frederick Coneybeer	Labor	East Torrens	1893–1921, 1924–1930
William Copley	ANL	Yorke Peninsula	1884–1887, 1896–1902
William Patrick Cummins		Stanley	1896–1907
John Darling, junior	ANL	East Torrens	1896–1905
Bill Denny ^{[2]}		West Adelaide	1900–1905, 1906–1933
Hugh Robert Dixson ^{[5]}		North Adelaide	1901–1905
Hon Sir John Downer ^{[6]}	ANL	Barossa	1878–1901
Charles Dumas		Mount Barker	1898–1902
Walter Hughes Duncan	ANL	Onkaparinga	1896–1906
Richard Foster		Newcastle	1893–1906
William Gilbert	ANL	Yatala	1881–1906
Clement Giles	ANL	Frome	1887–1902
Paddy Glynn ^{[5]}		North Adelaide	1887–1890, 1895–1896, 1897–1901
Henry Allerdale Grainger ^{[11]}		Wallaroo	1884–1885, 1890–1901
Walter Griffiths ^{[3]}		Northern Territory	1893–1900
James Hague	ANL	Barossa	1890–1902
Andrew Dods Handyside	ANL	Albert	1885–1904
Charles Edward Herbert ^{[3]}	ANL	Northern Territory	1900–1905
Frederick Holder ^{[7]}		Burra	1887–1901
Robert Homburg	ANL	Gumeracha	1884–1905
Richard Hooper	Labor	Wallaroo	1891–1902
Frank Hourigan ^{[12]}	Labor	West Torrens	1893–1901
James Hutchison	Labor	East Adelaide	1898–1902
William Jamieson ^{[8]}	ANL	Gumeracha	1901–1902, 1905–1912
Hon John Jenkins		Sturt	1887–1905
Francis Bernard Keogh ^{[4]}		West Adelaide	1901–1902
Rt Hon Charles Kingston ^{[2]}		West Adelaide	1881–1900
John Livingston		Victoria	1899–1906
Ivor MacGillivray	Labor	Port Adelaide	1893–1918
Alexander McDonald	ANL	Noarlunga	1887–1915
David McKenzie		Flinders	1899–1905
James McLachlan, senior		Wooroora	1893–1902
John Miller		Stanley	1884–1885, 1890–1893, 1890–1893, 1896–1902
Samuel James Mitchell ^{[10]}		Northern Territory	1901–1910
James Toulmin Morris		Victoria	1896–1902
William Tennant Mortlock ^{[9]}		Flinders	1896–1899, 1901–1902
Laurence O'Loughlin		Frome	1890–1918
Friedrich Wilhelm Paech		Light	1899–1908
Archibald Peake		Albert	1897–1915, 1915–1920
Hon Thomas Playford ^{[8]}		Gumeracha	1868–1871, 1875–1894, 1899–1901
Alexander Poynton ^{[9]}	Labor	Flinders	1893–1901
Thomas Price	Labor	Sturt	1893–1909
Ernest Roberts	Labor	Gladstone	1896–1902, 1905–1908
Hon Ben Rounsevell	ANL	Burra	1875–1893, 1899–1906
William Russell ^{[7]}		Burra	1901–1902
Theodor Scherk		East Adelaide	1886–1905
John Shannon		Yorke Peninsula	1896–1905
Vaiben Louis Solomon ^{[10]}		Northern Territory	1890–1901, 1905–1908
Charles Tucker ^{[1]}		Encounter Bay	1899–1906
John Verran ^{[11]}	Labor	Wallaroo	1901–1918
Louis von Doussa	ANL	Mount Barker	1899–1902
Richard Wood		North Adelaide	1893–1902

^{1} Encounter Bay MHA Charles Tucker was unseated by the Court of Disputed Returns on 6 July 1899. He was re-elected at the resulting by-election on 29 July.
^{2} West Adelaide MHA Charles Kingston resigned on 7 February 1900. Bill Denny won the resulting by-election on 17 March.
^{3} Northern Territory MHA Walter Griffiths died on 4 September 1900. Charles Edward Herbert won the resulting by-election on 20 October.
^{4} West Adelaide MHA Lee Batchelor vacated his seat when he was seated in the first Parliament of Australia on 9 May 1901. Francis Bernard Keogh won the resulting by-election on 1 June.
^{5} North Adelaide MHA Paddy Glynn vacated his seat when he was seated in the first Parliament of Australia on 9 May 1901. Hugh Robert Dixson won the resulting by-election on 1 June.
^{6} Barossa MHA John Downer vacated his seat when he was seated in the first Parliament of Australia on 9 May 1901. E. H. Coombe won the resulting by-election on 8 June.
^{7} Burra MHA Frederick Holder vacated his seat when he was seated in the first Parliament of Australia on 9 May 1901. William Russell won the resulting by-election on 8 June.
^{8} Gumeracha MHA Thomas Playford vacated his seat when he was seated in the first Parliament of Australia on 9 May 1901. William Jamieson won the resulting by-election on 1 June.
^{9} Flinders MHA Alexander Poynton vacated his seat when he was seated in the first Parliament of Australia on 9 May 1901. William Tennant Mortlock won the resulting by-election on 8 June.
^{10} Northern Territory MHA Vaiben Louis Solomon vacated his seat when he was seated in the first Parliament of Australia on 9 May 1901. Samuel James Mitchell won the resulting by-election on 15 June.
^{11} Wallaroo MHA Henry Allerdale Grainger resigned on 30 May 1901. John Verran won the resulting by-election on 22 June.
^{12} West Torrens MHA Frank Hourigan died on 1 December 1901. No by-election was held before the 1902 election.
