= Members of the South Australian House of Assembly, 1902–1905 =

This is a list of members of the South Australian House of Assembly from 1902 to 1905, as elected at the 1902 state election:

Name	Party	Electorate	Term of office
Peter Allen		Wallaroo	1902–1912, 1915–1925
William Archibald	Labor	Port Adelaide	1893–1910
William Blacker		Alexandra	1892–1913
Thomas Henry Brooker		Port Adelaide	1890–1905
Thomas Burgoyne	ANL	Flinders	1884–1915
Richard Butler		Barossa	1890–1924
Hon Alfred Catt		Stanley	1881–1906
Lewis Cohen	ANL	Adelaide	1887–1893, 1902–1906
Hon Sir Jenkin Coles	ANL	Wooroora	1875–1878, 1881–1911
Frederick Coneybeer	Labor	Torrens	1893–1921, 1924–1930
Ephraim Coombe		Barossa	1901–1912, 1915–1917
William Patrick Cummins	ANL	Stanley	1896–1907
John Darling, junior	ANL	Torrens	1896–1905
Bill Denny		Adelaide	1900–1905, 1906–1933
Hugh Robert Dixson		Adelaide	1901–1905
Walter Hughes Duncan	ANL	Murray	1896–1906
Richard Foster	ANL	Flinders	1893–1906
William Gilbert	ANL	Barossa	1881–1906
Andrew Dods Handyside ^{[1]}	ANL	Victoria and Albert	1885–1904
Charles Edward Herbert	ANL	Northern Territory	1900–1905
Robert Homburg	ANL	Murray	1884–1905
David James	ANL	Wooroora	1902–1918
Hon John Jenkins		Torrens	1887–1905
John Livingston		Victoria and Albert	1899–1906
Ivor MacGillivray	Labor	Port Adelaide	1893–1918
Alexander McDonald	ANL	Alexandra	1887–1915
David McKenzie		Flinders	1899–1905
William Miller		Burra Burra	1902–1918
Samuel James Mitchell		Northern Territory	1901–1910
Hon Laurence O'Loughlin		Burra Burra	1890–1918
Friedrich Wilhelm Paech	ANL	Wooroora	1899–1908
Archibald Peake		Victoria and Albert	1897–1915, 1915–1920
Friedrich Pflaum		Murray	1902–1915
Thomas Price	Labor	Torrens	1893–1909
George Ritchie		Alexandra	1902–1922
Hon Ben Rounsevell		Burra Burra	1875–1893, 1899–1906
William Senior ^{[1]}	Labor	Victoria and Albert	1904–1912
Theodor Scherk		Adelaide	1886–1905
John Shannon		Wallaroo	1896–1905
George Klewitz Soward	ANL	Torrens	1902–1905
Charles Tucker	ANL	Alexandra	1899–1906
John Verran	Labor	Wallaroo	1901–1918
Frederick William Young	ANL	Stanley	1902–1905, 1909–1915

^{1} Victoria and Albert MHA Andrew Dods Handyside died on 23 May 1904. William Senior won the resulting by-election on 25 June.
