= Andrew Handyside =

Andrew Handyside may refer to:

- Andrew Handyside and Company, iron founder in Derby, England; founded by Andrew Handyside (1805–1887)
- Andrew Dods Handyside (1835–1904), politician in South Australia
