= Ernest Roberts (Australian politician) =

Australian politician and soldier (1868–1913)

The Honourable Ernest Roberts
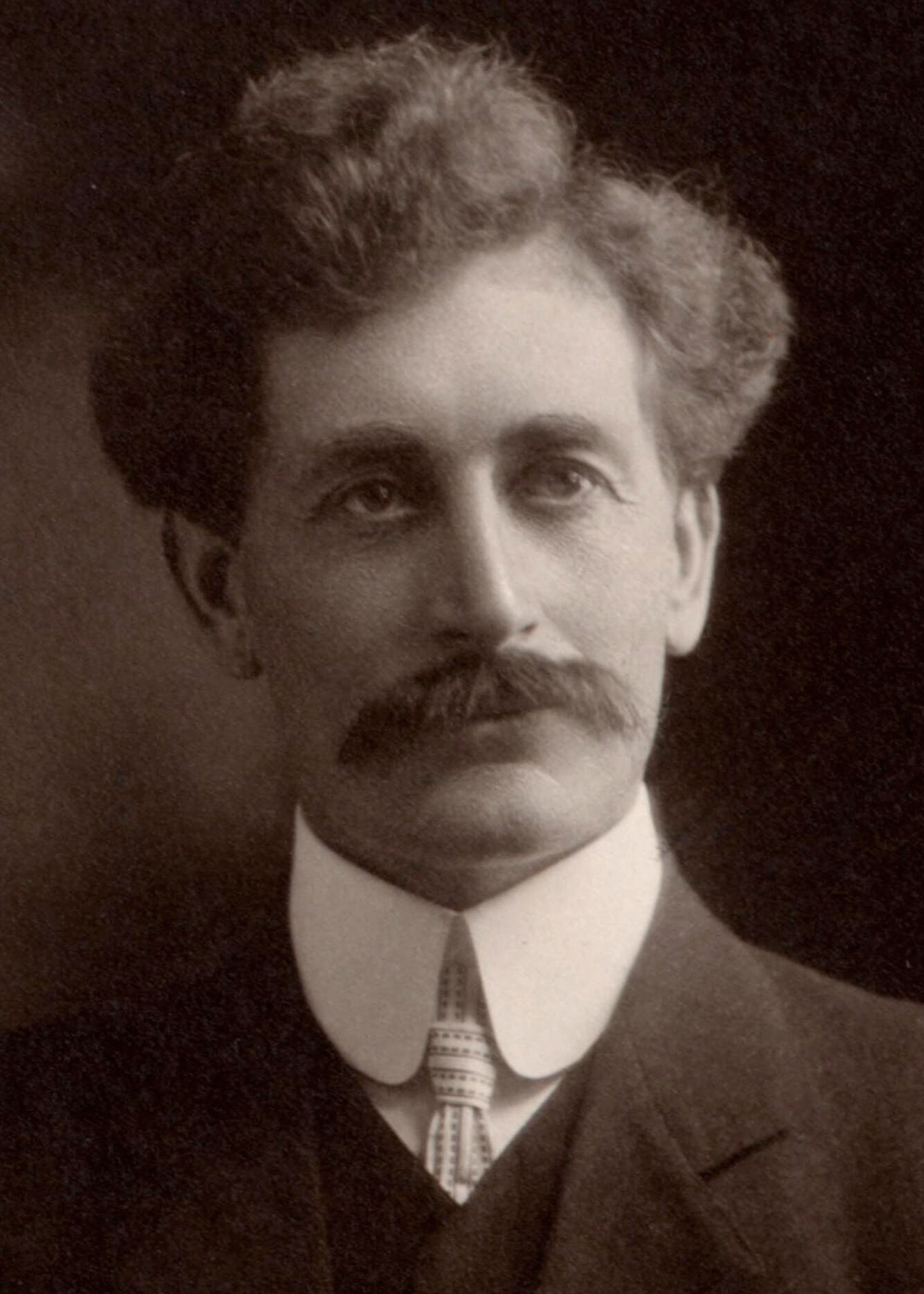
- Roberts in c. 1908

Member of the Australian House of Representatives for Adelaide
- In office 13 June 1908 – 2 December 1913
- Preceded by: Charles Kingston
- Succeeded by: George Edwin Yates

Member of the South Australian House of Assembly for Adelaide
- In office 27 May 1905 – 15 May 1908
- Preceded by: Bill Denny
- Succeeded by: Edward Alfred Anstey

Member of the South Australian House of Assembly for Gladstone
- In office 25 April 1896 – 3 May 1902
- Preceded by: James Henderson Howe
- Succeeded by: Seat abolished

Personal details
- Born: 21 February 1868 London, England
- Died: 2 December 1913 (aged 45) Melbourne, Australia
- Party: Labor
- Spouse: Bridget Marie Collins (m. 1892)
- Children: 4
- Occupation: Wharf labourer, journalist, politician
- Military service
- Allegiance: British/Australian
- Branch: 4th Imperial Bushmen's Contingent; 2nd Battalion, Australian Commonwealth Horse
- Service years: 1900–1902
- Rank: Captain

Ernest Alfred Roberts (21 February 1868 – 2 December 1913) was an Australian politician and soldier who was a Labor member of the South Australian House of Assembly from 1896 to 1902 and 1905 to 1908 and then the Australian House of Representatives from 1908 to 1913. Roberts also served as an officer in South Africa during the Second Boer War, with South Australian colonial forces in 1900 and Commonwealth forces in 1902. From 1904 to 1908 he was the editor of The Herald, a left-wing newspaper published by the United Labor Party (ULP).

Born in London and schooled on the island of Guernsey, Roberts initially followed his father into the merchant marine, and after briefly living in Queensland he moved to Port Pirie, South Australia. There he worked on the wharves, was active in the labour movement, and was a member of the town council. In 1893 he ran unsuccessfully for the seat of Gladstone in the House of Assembly as an independent Labour candidate. On his second attempt in 1896 he was elected as a ULP candidate, and was the youngest member of the assembly. He cemented his position at the 1899 election. In late 1899, he crossed the floor and contributed to the defeat of the ministry of Charles Kingston, attracting sharp criticism from some parts of the ULP.

In 1900, Roberts served in the Second Boer War in South Africa as a lieutenant with the 4th Imperial Bushmen's Contingent raised from South Australia. After its arrival in June his unit was involved in several engagements, including the relief of the garrison at Elands River. In December, Roberts, considering the fighting almost over, asked for and received permission to return home, and resumed his seat in the assembly. Post-Federation, Roberts helped raise a unit of the Australian Commonwealth Horse and served with it as a captain in South Africa in 1902. The main operation of his unit was as part of a large-scale concerted "drive" to push the remaining Boers to surrender, and Roberts personally accepted the surrender of more than 190 Boers, along with the capture of a similar number of horses. Roberts' term in the assembly expired while he was absent in South Africa, and he did not contest any seat at the 1902 South Australian state election. From 1904 to 1908 Roberts edited The Herald, and he successfully ran for the seat of Adelaide in the 1905 state election. He was re-elected in the state election of 3 November 1906. He was vice-president and then president of the ULP in 1907–1908, and was also a member of the council of the South Australian School of Mines and a board member of the Adelaide Co-operative Society.

When a by-election was called for 13 June 1908 in the federal division of Adelaide following Kingston's death, Roberts ran as the Australian Labour (Labor from 1912) Party candidate and won the seat, then retained it in the 1910 federal election. Roberts represented the minister for defence, Senator George Pearce, in the House of Representatives, and also while Pearce was overseas in 1911, and was appointed as an honorary minister later that year. He retained his seat at the 1913 federal election, but soon after a fierce parliamentary debate on 2 December 1913 he collapsed and died from a heart condition. He received a state funeral attended by 6,000 people. The loss of Roberts – considered a highly capable and up-and-coming member of the ULP – was felt intensely by his political comrades, along with his fire, energy and enthusiasm. In 1917 a monument was erected over his grave at West Terrace Cemetery in Adelaide, which The Advertiser newspaper described as "emblematic of the untimely end to [his] brilliant career".

== Early life ==
Ernest Alfred Roberts was born in London on 21 February 1868, the son of John Henry Roberts and his wife Sarah Ann née Woodford. His father was an officer in the merchant marine. Ernest attended school on the island of Guernsey in the English Channel off the coast of Normandy. He followed in his father's footsteps and became a sailor before settling in Queensland in 1886. Two years later he moved to Port Pirie, South Australia, where he obtained work as a wharf labourer. Described in his entry in the Australian Dictionary of Biography as "[a] radical with exceptional abilities as an orator and organi[s]er", Roberts was closely involved in the formation of a local workingmen's association, becoming its inaugural secretary. He also assisted in the establishment and management of a local cooperative bakery in Port Pirie, and was a member of the town council in the early 1890s. On 27 August 1892, Roberts married Bridget Marie Collins, with whom he had a son and three daughters.

== Early political career ==
In the 1893 South Australian colonial election, Roberts contested the two-member seat of Gladstone in the South Australian House of Assembly – the lower house of the South Australian parliament – as an independent Labor candidate, losing narrowly but gaining 30.0 per cent of the votes. Undeterred, Roberts contested the same seat in the 1896 election as a United Labor Party (ULP) candidate, and was successful, coming second with 30.8 per cent of the votes, after the incumbent independent Alfred Catt.

At 28, Roberts was the youngest member of the assembly, but he quickly became well known for his advocacy for the early closing of factories to reduce working hours, and for improved working conditions for sailors. A local weekly magazine, The Critic, described him as a "swollen-headed young man" who was "as caustic as he is clever". In 1897 Roberts was a member of the state royal commission into the waterworks proposed at Bundaleer near Jamestown in the mid-north of the state. He strengthened his position at the 1899 election, and was returned first with 40.2 per cent of the votes, relegating Catt to the second seat. The premier of South Australia, Charles Kingston, had been obsessed for a long period with reducing the ability of the South Australian Legislative Council – the colony's upper house – to amend or reject legislation, but his reforms – aimed at widening the franchise to all households rather than a set amount of property value – were repeatedly voted down by its members. Kingston governed with the support of the ULP, and his supporters became concerned that his preoccupation with the issue would lead to him seeking a fresh election, with an uncertain outcome. When liberal faction leader Thomas Burgoyne sponsored a motion against Kingston in November 1899, Roberts, along with his ULP colleague Alexander Poynton and others, crossed the floor of the assembly, causing Kingston's ministry to fall by one vote.

Roberts was sharply criticised for his part in bringing down the Kingston ministry, including at a meeting of the Labor Regulation League, which almost unanimously passed a motion stating that the action of Roberts and Poynton in crossing the floor was "an act of political treachery". The attacks on Roberts continued, the editor of The Herald, the trade union–run weekly magazine, joining the trenchant criticism and rejecting Roberts' explanations that he had not been a member of the Parliamentary Labor Party at the time of the vote and had not attended the relevant caucus meeting, and was not pledged to maintain solidarity with Labor. Roberts later justified his actions on the basis that the Kingston government was insincere and not likely to carry out the reforms it had promised.

== Soldier and journalist ==
Although Roberts initially opposed the sending of South Australian colonial troops to the Second Boer War in 1899 on the grounds of cost and necessity, combined with his impression that it was based on sentiment and not a true spirit of loyalty, his position altered in response to British defeats, and in early 1900 he volunteered for the 4th Imperial Bushmen's Contingent raised from South Australia, and was commissioned as a lieutenant. At his farewell, he stated that he had volunteered to show solidarity with the mainly British uitlander migrant workers in the Boer republics, to broaden his experience and strengthen himself for political battles to come. He was criticised at the event for leaving his electoral district and for breaking away from the Labor Party during the fall of the Kingston ministry. He vigorously defended himself, and his explanation was met with loud cheers from the crowd. He also stated that colonial troops were now needed to maintain the solidarity of the British Empire. The contingent, which consisted of two mounted squadrons commanded by Lieutenant Colonel James Rowell, embarked on the transport Manhattan at Port Adelaide on 1 May 1900. After picking up a squadron of Western Australian troops at Fremantle, the ship stopped at Beira in Portuguese Mozambique, and Durban in the Colony of Natal, before disembarking the troops at Port Elizabeth in the Cape Colony on 19 June. Upon arrival, the South Australian and Western Australian contingents were joined with a Tasmanian squadron to form an Australian mounted regiment of about 400 troops, under Rowell's command.

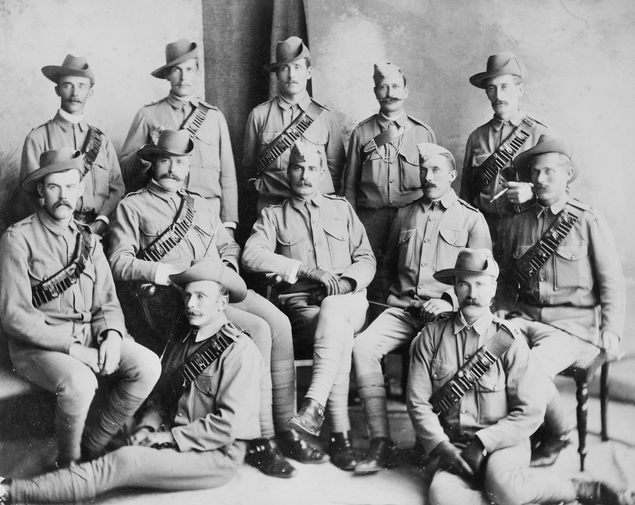
Group portrait of members of the 4th Imperial Bushmen's Contingent from South Australia prior to embarking for South Africa

Soon after its arrival, the regiment escorted a convoy from Kroonstad to Lindley in the Orange Free State. Attached to a battalion of imperial yeomanry commanded by British Colonel Arthur Montagu Brookfield supported by some artillery, the regiment escorted a convoy drawn by steam tractors, leaving Lindley on 23 June. The convoy was regularly sniped at by Boers, but the troops, supported by the guns, drove them off each time. On 2 July Brookfield's column joined the command of Major General Arthur Paget for operations against the Boer commandoes led by Christiaan de Wet between Lindley and Bethlehem, also located in the Orange Free State. This larger force was also subjected to frequent sniping by the Boers. As the force approached Bakenkop hill on 3 July, the Boers held their ground instead of withdrawing, and Brookfield used the guns to disperse them. To conserve ammunition, Brookfield ordered the guns to cease fire, but about 100 Boers took advantage of the situation, crept through a cornfield and rushed some guns. In response, an artillery officer called upon the commander of the South Australian squadron to charge the guns and recapture them. Without waiting for the rest of the squadron, a dozen men led by Lieutenant Edwin Leane responded immediately and charged. The Boers fled, the guns being recaptured by the squadron. On 4 July Brookfield's force captured a ridge that dominated Bethlehem.

Bethlehem was captured on 7 July, in which 300 South Australians and Western Australians of the regiment participated, the Tasmanians having been detached to Pretoria. De Wet and 2,000 of his troops escaped north, and the regiment pursued them to the Reitzburg hills as part of a force under Brigadier General Robert Broadwood. Engagements followed at Palmietfontein on 16 July and Stinkhoutboom on 24 July. In the latter action, the regiment and some irregulars caught up with some flour-laden wagons of de Wet's rearguard and the Boers struck back to protect the precious supplies, killing four Australians. The Boers were able to break contact and continue their retreat. Under Broadwood's command the regiment continued to pursue de Wet into the Transvaal, but by that point half of the South Australians were on foot, as their horses had died. The pursuit was called off. This period included operations through Oliphant's Nek and the Magaliesberg Range, as well as the involvement of the regiment in the relief of the garrison at Elands River.

On 29 November, the regiment was involved in fighting at Rhenoster Kop under Paget, and was then attached to the command of Colonel Herbert Plumer. In December, given his view that the fighting was almost over, Roberts obtained permission from the British commander-in-chief to return home to his parliamentary and civic duties. He embarked on the cargo liner Aberdeen at Cape Town on 7 December, and arrived in Adelaide via Melbourne on 5 January 1901. The rest of the contingent embarked on 5 July 1901, came ashore at Port Adelaide on 27 July, and was disbanded shortly thereafter. For his service with the 4th Imperial Bushmen's Contingent, Roberts was issued with the Queen's South Africa Medal with four clasps.

Roberts returned to his seat in the assembly, but then helped organise a further South Australian contingent for the Second Boer War, a company of the 2nd Battalion, Australian Commonwealth Horse (ACH), which was authorised on 6 January 1902. Roberts was appointed as a lieutenant and as the battalion adjutant, and embarked at Melbourne on the transport St. Andrew on 12 January, disembarking at Durban on 10 March. While at sea on 26 January, Roberts was promoted to captain. Upon arrival, the Victorian contingent of the battalion joined with the company Roberts had helped raise from South Australia, and a smaller contingent from Western Australia, to form the battalion, which was commanded by Lieutenant Colonel Duncan McLeish.

The battalion was sent by rail to a camp at Newcastle in Natal. After training and inspections, between 6 and 10 April the battalion continued on to camp near Klerksdorp where it was allocated to a brigade commanded by Lieutenant Colonel Beauvoir De Lisle, itself part of a column commanded by Colonel Alexander Thorneycroft, and under the overall command of Lieutenant General Sir Ian Hamilton. Hamilton's force, numbering 20,000 mostly mounted troops, was tasked to destroy the Boer forces commanded by Koos de la Rey. De Lisle was particularly impressed by the 2nd Battalion ACH. On 23 April, the brigade was part of a general move through Paardeplaats, Hartebeesfontein, Palmfontein and Boschpoort, during which they mostly burned crops. This was followed by a "drive" by the entire force departing from Noitverwacht towards the Hartz River commencing on 7 May, on a frontage 80 kilometres (50 mi) wide. The battalion advanced through Joubert's Rust on 8 May, Rapoli and Boesman's Pan on 9 May, and Bodenstein, Wonderfontein and Kaal Platts on 10 May. This brought the drive to the border between British Bechuanaland and the Transvaal. Significant numbers of Boer troops were observed ahead of the advancing battalion, but no fighting took place. On the night of 10 May the Boers unsuccessfully attempted to break through the line of advancing troops. On the following day, a Boer commando approached under a white flag, and Roberts rode out, bringing in 191 prisoners and over 200 horses. Another 52 Boers surrendered to other elements of the battalion. The drive was called to a halt at 15:00 on 11 May, when it reached the Kimberley to Mafeking railway line, and the commander-in-chief of British forces, Lord Kitchener, telegraphed his appreciation to Hamilton for the efforts of his troops. Across the five days of the drive, only one Boer was killed, and no Australians were even wounded.

The battalion returned to Klerksdorp on 21 May, and after peace was concluded on 31 May, remained there until 20 June. Hamilton congratulated the Australians for playing a "distinguished part in the closing act of the war". The battalion then rode to Elandsfontein, arrived there on 25 June, handed over their weapons and equipment, and entrained for Newcastle on 29 June, arriving there the following day. On 5 July, the battalion entrained for Durban, and embarked on the transport Norfolk the next day. The ship departed on 8 July, arrived at Albany, Western Australia, on 25 July and Adelaide five days later. The troops were paid off and discharged on the day of their return. Roberts did not receive any additional medal or clasps for his service with the 2nd Battalion, Australian Commonwealth Horse.

While he was away in South Africa, Roberts' term in the assembly expired, and he did not contest a seat at the 1902 South Australian state election on 3 May, the seat of Gladstone having been abolished in a redistribution. From 1904 to 1908 Roberts edited The Herald.

== Later political career ==
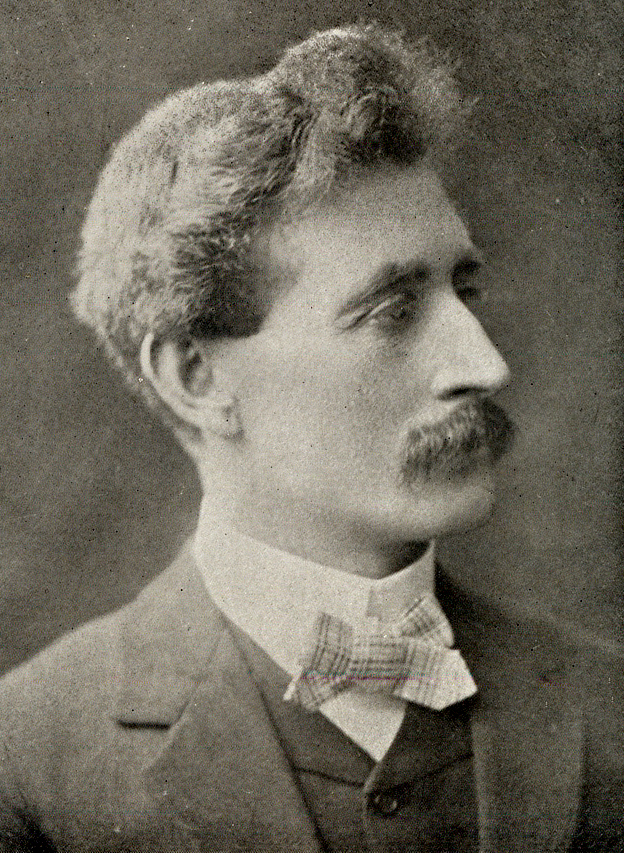
Roberts in 1905

Roberts was a candidate for the four-member seat of Adelaide in the 1905 state election on 27 May, and finished second with 13.0 per cent of the votes. The election brought the Price-Peake government to power, a minority government under the ULP premier, Thomas Price, working in a coalition with the Liberal independents led by Archibald Peake. In late 1905, Roberts founded the South Australian Government General Workers Association. Roberts actively supported the coalition government. Continuing deadlock over franchise reform for the upper house led to another state election on 3 November 1906, at which Roberts was elected third in the seat of Adelaide, with 18.5 per cent of the votes. The Price-Peake coalition government continued to rule after the election, but the Liberal independents had coalesced into a party before the election, the Liberal and Democratic Union, which governed alongside the ULP. Roberts was a member of state royal commissions in 1906 and 1908, inquiring into the affairs of produce merchants and into wheat-marketing practices in the state respectively. He was vice-president and then president of the ULP in 1907–1908, and was also a member of the council of the South Australian School of Mines and a board member of the Adelaide Co-operative Society. On 5 September 1907, the Hundred of Roberts – a constituent division of the County of Jervois land administration unit – was proclaimed in honour of Roberts.

When the incumbent member for the federal division of Adelaide and former premier, Charles Kingston, died on 11 May 1908, a by-election was called. Roberts won the 13 June by-election as the Australian Labour (Labor from 1912) Party candidate against the independent Anti-Socialist Party candidate Alexander McLachlan, receiving 51.2 per cent of the votes. Roberts retained his seat in the 1910 federal election, again defeating McLachlan, and received 63.3 per cent of the votes. As the minister for defence, George Pearce, was a senator, Roberts ably represented Pearce in the House of Representatives. Roberts was the acting minister for defence in 1911 while Pearce was visiting the United Kingdom for the 1911 Imperial Conference, and following the death of fellow South Australian Lee Batchelor, Roberts was appointed an honorary minister – essentially a minister without portfolio – from 23 October 1911, as part of the second Fisher Ministry. He retained his seat at the 1913 federal election of 31 May, increasing his share of the votes to 66.1 per cent.

== Death and legacy ==
Minutes after speaking in a fiery debate at Parliament in Melbourne on 2 December 1913, Roberts collapsed and died. He reportedly struck his head on the base of a stone statue of Queen Victoria when he collapsed. He had suffered from a heart condition for a long time. He was survived by his wife and four children. His wife Bridget formed the first Labor women's branch in South Australia at Prospect in 1913. Roberts was buried in the West Terrace Cemetery after a state funeral attended by around 6,000 people.

On 13 January 1917, a monument erected over his grave was unveiled. It consists of a broken column of white Angaston marble, which was "emblematic of the untimely end to the brilliant career of the deceased legislator". The unveiling was attended by the premier, Crawford Vaughan, the speaker of the House of Assembly, Frederick Coneybeer, the state secretary of the ULP, and federal and state legislators. At the base of the monument was the inscription "He died at his post." The monument was paid for by subscriptions received by the Labor Regulation League at their meetings, and was draped with the Union Jack and Australian flag before being unveiled by Roberts' successor in the federal seat of Adelaide, George Edwin Yates.

According to his entry in the Australian Dictionary of Biography written by City of Adelaide archivist Robert Thornton, despite Roberts' almost diminutive stature, he was a fiery, energetic and enthusiastic man who rarely missed a day in parliament. Although he confided in private that he suffered an "unconquerable inward nervousness", Roberts was outstanding in parliamentary debates, highly skilled at quick and witty responses, and expressed himself readily and at length. The quality of his parliamentary speeches was comparable to those of his contemporary Billy Hughes. At the time of his death, Roberts was widely considered one of Labor's most capable members, was continuing to develop his political skills, and his premature death was much mourned within Labor. The Bulletin – an influential weekly magazine – observed that Labor had lost "one of the pluckiest men" it had ever known.

Roberts' memorial
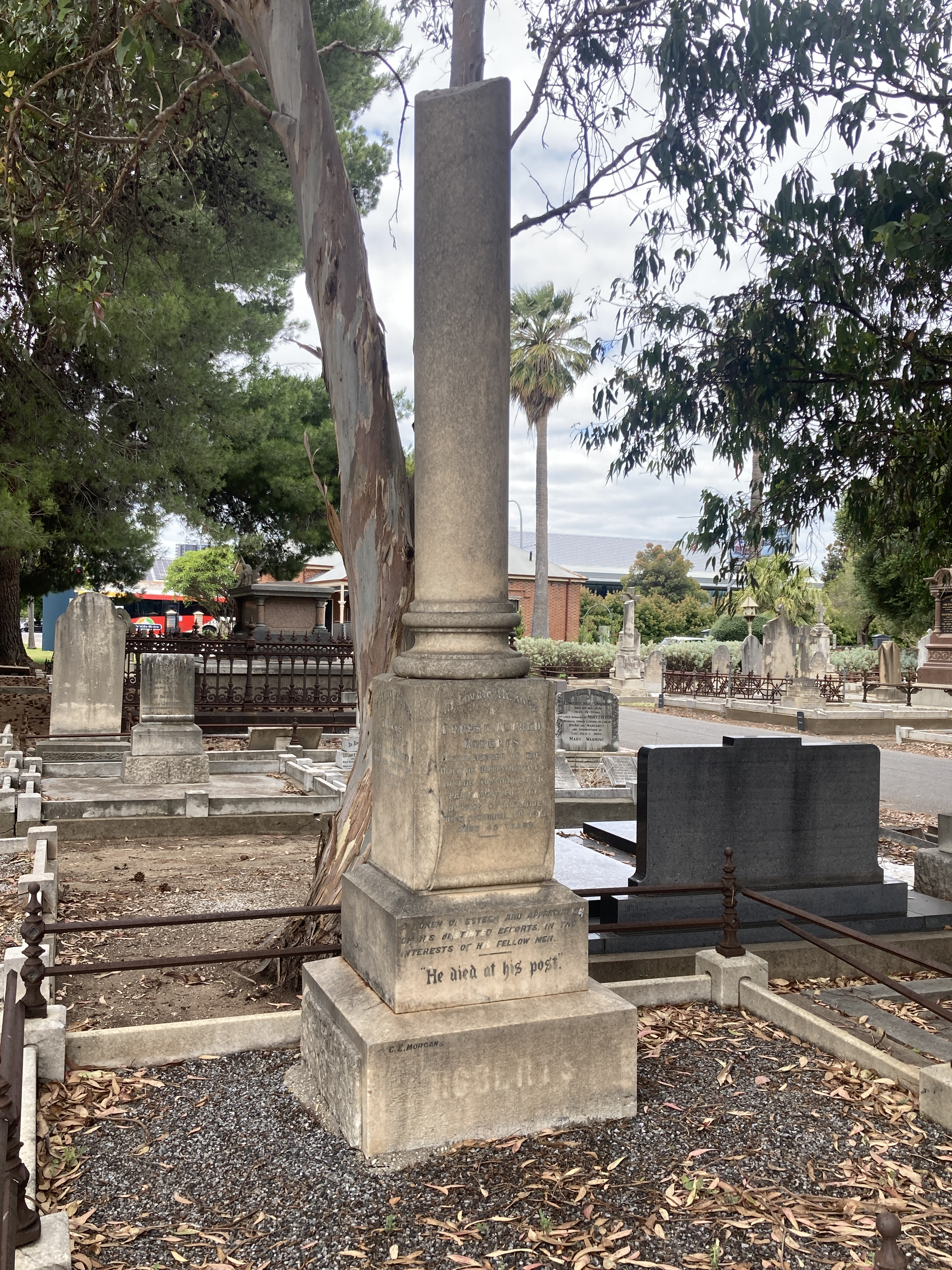
Ernest Alfred Roberts' memorial at West Terrace Cemetery in 2022

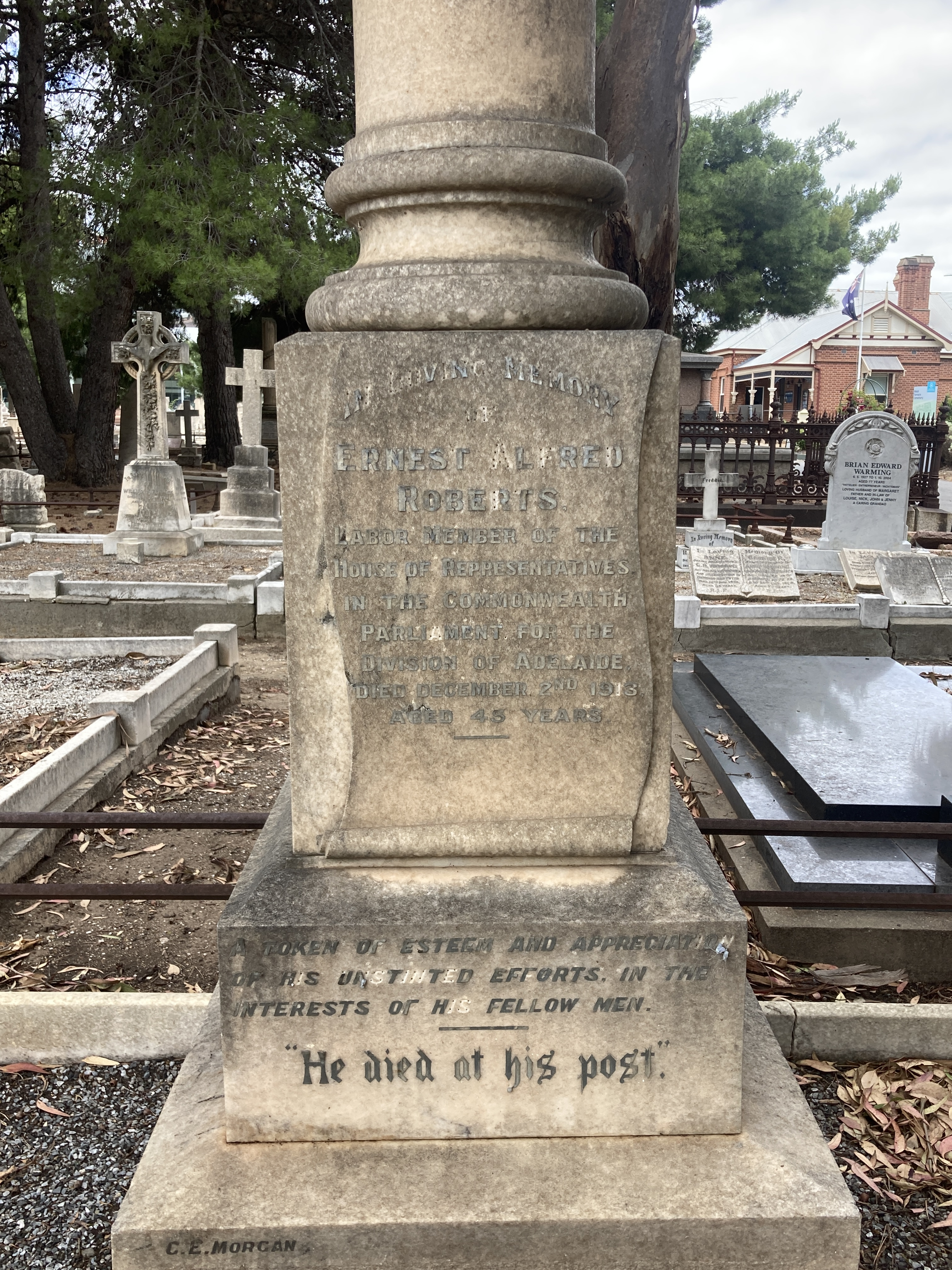
Close-up of the inscription on Roberts' memorial

== Footnotes ==
South Australian House of Assembly
Preceded by James Howe	Member for Gladstone; 1896–1902; Served alongside: Alfred Catt	Seat abolished
Preceded by Bill Denny	Member for Adelaide; 1905–1906; Served alongside: William David Ponder; Lewis Cohen; James Zimri Sellar	Succeeded by William David Ponder
Preceded by Lewis Cohen	Member for Adelaide; 1906–1908; Served alongside: Bill Denny; William David Ponder; James Zimri Sellar/Reginald Blundell	Succeeded by Edward Alfred Anstey
Parliament of Australia
Preceded by Charles Kingston	Member for Adelaide; 1908–1913	Succeeded by George Edwin Yates
