= John Langdon Parsons =

Australian politician

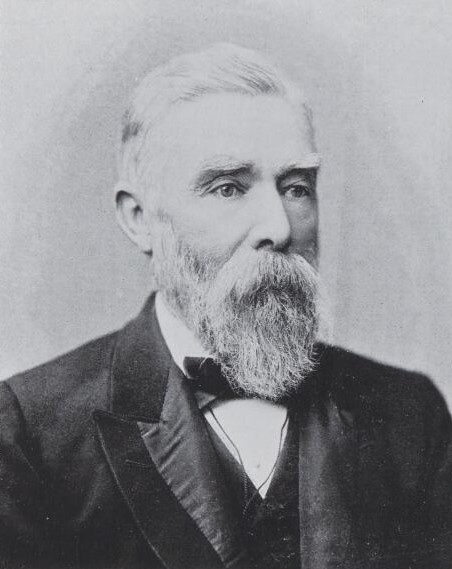

John Langdon Parsons (28 April 1837 – 21 August 1903), generally referred to as "J. Langdon Parsons", was a Cornish Australian minister of the Baptist church, politician, and the 5th Government Resident of the Northern Territory, 1884–1890.

== Biography ==
Parsons was born on 28 April 1837 at Botathan near Launceston, Cornwall, a son of Edward Parsons and his wife Jane, née Langdon. He was educated at local schools and Bellevue Grammar School, Plymouth and was subsequently employed in a business house in London, but left to study for the Baptist ministry at Regent's Park College.

He left for South Australia aboard Orient in company with merchant Charles H. Goode, arriving in July 1863, and preached his first sermon at George Stonehouse's Baptist church on LeFevre Terrace, North Adelaide on 19 July. He proceeded to Angaston, where he attracted large congregations, and married a granddaughter of George Fife Angas on 23 January 1866. He accepted an invitation to serve at the Baptist Church in Dunedin, New Zealand, but the climate affected his wife's health, and they returned to Angaston. In 1869 Rev. Stonehouse had been forced by a throat malady to retire from active ministry, and Parsons accepted the invitation to take over that pulpit. The congregation had outgrown their building and it was decided to build a new church on Tynte Street, North Adelaide, and meanwhile services were held in the Temperance Hall on the same street. In December 1869 the foundation stone was laid, and the first service was held in the new North Adelaide Baptist Church on 6 November 1870.

He left the ministry on account of failing health, or loss of faith, and after a holiday in England and Norway, joined with J. Preston as merchants, then with Ebenezer Finlayson's brokerage and agency business. He then determined to enter politics. He was elected to the Assembly seat for Encounter Bay in 1878 as a colleague of (later Sir) James Boucaut until 1881, then won North Adelaide in 1881.

For some years previously he had been a useful member of the Council of Education, and resigned prior to entering parliament, but the cause was dear to his heart, and he was appointed Minister of Education in 1881, serving until 1884, in which year he was granted the Queen's permission to bear for life the title of "honorable".

In debate he soon established a reputation as one of the most fluent and persuasive speakers of the House. Lucid, exact, and eloquent, there was a charm, and vitality about Mr. Parsons' speeches that won the sympathy and admiration of legislators, as well as of outside audiences. Few publicists in the history of the State cultivated the art of oratory with greater success. ... As Minister of Education, he was one of the most enlightened, and useful administrators who have occupied the office in South Australia; and he earnestly applied himself to strengthening and consolidating the educational system.

In 1884 Parsons was appointed Government Resident for the Northern Territory, residing at Port Darwin. He served in this position for six years and the reports he wrote were widely read, not only for their insights but for their literary charm. He resigned his position ahead of the creation of a separate electoral district for the Northern Territory in 1890, and was elected, with Vaiben Louis Solomon as his colleague, and served as the first Minister for the Northern Territory, from 1890 to 1893. He was instrumental in the development of railways in the Territory, and he also recognised Aboriginal land rights. On the dissolution of Parliament in 1893 Mr. Parsons did not seek re-election.

In 1895 he visited Japan as hon. commissioner for the Government of South Australia to enquire into the prospects of opening up trade relations with Japan, China, and the Philippine Islands. Parsons did much to extend trade with the Far East, and as recognition of his efforts the Emperor of Japan conferred upon him the Order of the Rising Sun. In 1896 he was appointed Consul for Japan, and in 1898 when he revisited that country he was granted an audience with the Emperor, who presented him with a pair of valuable cloisonné vases.

In 1896 Parsons was unsuccessful in his bid for election as a delegate to the Federal Convention. He was elected to the Legislative Council for the Central district in February 1901 for the National Defence League and served to 1903.

[Parsons] was one of the most scholarly men in South Australia. As a lecturer he achieved the highest, distinction, his erudition being as marked as his eloquence. The political character of Mr. Parsons was aptly described by Mr. Geo. E. Loyau in his "Representative Men of South Australia" (1883) in the following words:—"Mr Parsons is a logical and straightforward politician; and whilst having the interests of the constituency he represents thoroughly at heart, he never appears to forget the duty he owes to the country at large."

He introduced Australia's first crematorium with Dr. Robert Tracey Wilde at West Terrace Cemetery in Adelaide around that same time. For the last three years his health progressively deteriorated. His breathing became more difficult, as a consequence of a heart complaint brought on by rheumatic fever when a child. Nevertheless, he continued to sit in the Legislative Council until a week before his death. His mind remained clear and he suffered no pain throughout his illness.

== Family ==
Parsons married Rosetta Angas Johnson (1846 – 17 March 1876), granddaughter of George Fife Angas, on 23 January 1866

- Elsie Mary Parsons (17 August 1868 – 1932) married Allan Campbell Kerr (c. 1852 – 2 January 1898) on 1 June 1893. She married again, to David Herbert Power, of Wirrilla, Manoora on 16 May 1900.
- Sir Herbert Angas Parsons (23 May 1872 – 2 November 1945) married Mary Elsie Bonython (1874 – 1956) in 1900. He was a politician and judge.

He married again, to Marianna Dewhirst (1852 – 31 December 1937) on 4 August 1877. She was the eldest daughter of Edward Dewhirst, Inspector of Schools.

- Hilda Muriel Parsons (1878–1962)
- Percivall Hugh Parsons (1879 – )
- Walter Langdon Parsons (16 August 1881 – 2 March 1955) married Florence Mary Raymont (1884–1949) in 1910. He was a politician
- E(rnest) Harold Parsons (1883 – ) married Alice Mary Dibben ( –1970) of Pinnaroo on 17 September 1913
- Ida Lillian Parsons (1885–1891)
- F. L. Parsons ( – )

Their last (summer?) residence was "Botathan", Aldgate

== See also ==
- Cornish Australian
- John Langdon Bonython

Government offices
Preceded by Edward William Price	Government Resident of the Northern Territory; 1884–1890	Succeeded by John George Knight
