= West Adelaide =

West Adelaide may refer to:

- A geographical region to the west of the Adelaide city centre in South Australia
  - West Adelaide SC, Reformed football club 1978 NSL Champions (also known as West Adelaide Hellas and Adelaide Sharks)
  - West Adelaide Football Club an Australian rules football club
  - West Adelaide Bearcats a basketball team
  - the Electoral district of West Adelaide

== See also ==
- Western Adelaide, a region in South Australia
