= Darwin Pioneer Cemetery =

Cemetery in Darwin, Northern Territory, Australia

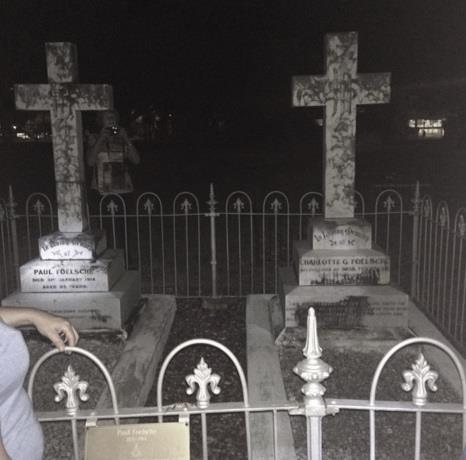
- Interactive map of Darwin Pioneer Cemetery

Details
- Established: unknown
- Closed: 1919
- Location: Goyder Road, Darwin, Northern Territory
- Country: Australia
- Coordinates: 12°26′13″S 130°50′26″E
- No. of interments: 1,230
- Website: Palmerston Cemetery
- Find a Grave: Darwin Pioneer Cemetery

Darwin Pioneer Cemetery was the first official cemetery opened in Darwin in the Northern Territory of Australia. It was originally known as Palmerston Cemetery. The cemetery stands as a testament to the many different cultural groups with different religious affiliations that lived in the early years of the city. Proposed in 1869, when the original survey for a town was conducted, the first burials took place around 1872 or 1873. The cemetery closed in 1919; however, a number of burials were carried out after its closure including people that were associated with the pioneering families. Overall, about 1,230 burials took place, although 450 burials were not recorded by Births, Deaths and Marriages.

== History ==
In February 1869 George Woodroffe Goyder, the Surveyor General, and a survey team arrived in Port Darwin to survey the new town of Palmerston (now known as Darwin). One of Goyder's tasks was to provide for the first cemetery which included 48 acres. Today, this is from where Graham Street in Stuart Park runs to what is now the Stuart Highway running from about Nylander Street.

The occupants of the cemetery include a wide range of people from Darwin and include infants and people from many different cultural backgrounds. This reflects the cultural diversity of the town's early history which included Chinese, Japanese and Malay people. Causes of death of the occupants include suicide, stillbirth and drowning. A school teacher's death was described in the records as "visitation from God". One of the first occupants is thought to be Charles Harvey, a carpenter, who died on 4 October 1872. Other deaths were soon to follow: in November of the same year trooper William Davies was killed by a crocodile off Lameroo Beach while swimming. Davies was followed by two miners, Robert McCracken and JW Smith, who died in 1873.

The cemetery contains many graves of people that are involved in the establishment of Darwin. One example is John George Knight, who was one of the most senior officials in the Northern Territory at the time of his death. There is also a monument to Edward (Ned) Tuckwell, buried in 1882, who along with his wife Eliza were involved in the pre-Darwin settlement at Escape Cliffs. Other prominent pioneering families are also buried in the cemetery including Spain, Brown and Bell. Other significant graves include Paul Foelsche and his wife Charlotte, Foelsche led the Northern Territory Mounted Police and was noted as a recorder of Territory history through his writings and photography. The cemetery's most impressive headstone, in the form of a 1m marble angel, belongs to Thomas Crush, the Territory's first Labour member of Parliament in South Australia and whom along with his wife Fannie (later Haynes) built the Federation Hotel at Brocks Creek.

The cemetery also tells the tale of many inhabitants who died tragic deaths. This includes the death of Captain Joe Bradshaw who lost over four hundred thousand pounds in his venture then died of gangrene in 1916, there was Yusumatsu Tokayama who died two months later, most likely of the bends, while working for a pittance as a diver.

The cemetery became less important after the opening of Gardens Cemetery in 1919, after which time it was closed.

== Today ==
The cemetery was subject to an inadequate record keeping and documentation, because of this many of the occupants are unknown. Overtime grave markers have disappeared, and some memorials have been destroyed. Today there are about 90 graves still visible. The cemetery is now fenced to protect what remains, and is managed by the City of Darwin who undertook an upgrade project in 1983, one outcome of which was the installation of a plaque that displays some of the locations of graves and occupants. Other upgrades include a memorial plaque to the John Knight Memorial in 2003. Ghost tours are now also carried out in the cemetery. Recent controversy has arisen over rezoning nearby land that nearby residents were concerned could disturb unmarked graves.
