= 1908 Adelaide by-election =

- 13 June 1908

The Adelaide seat in the House of Representatives
- Registered: 29,874
- Turnout: 10,068 (33.70%)
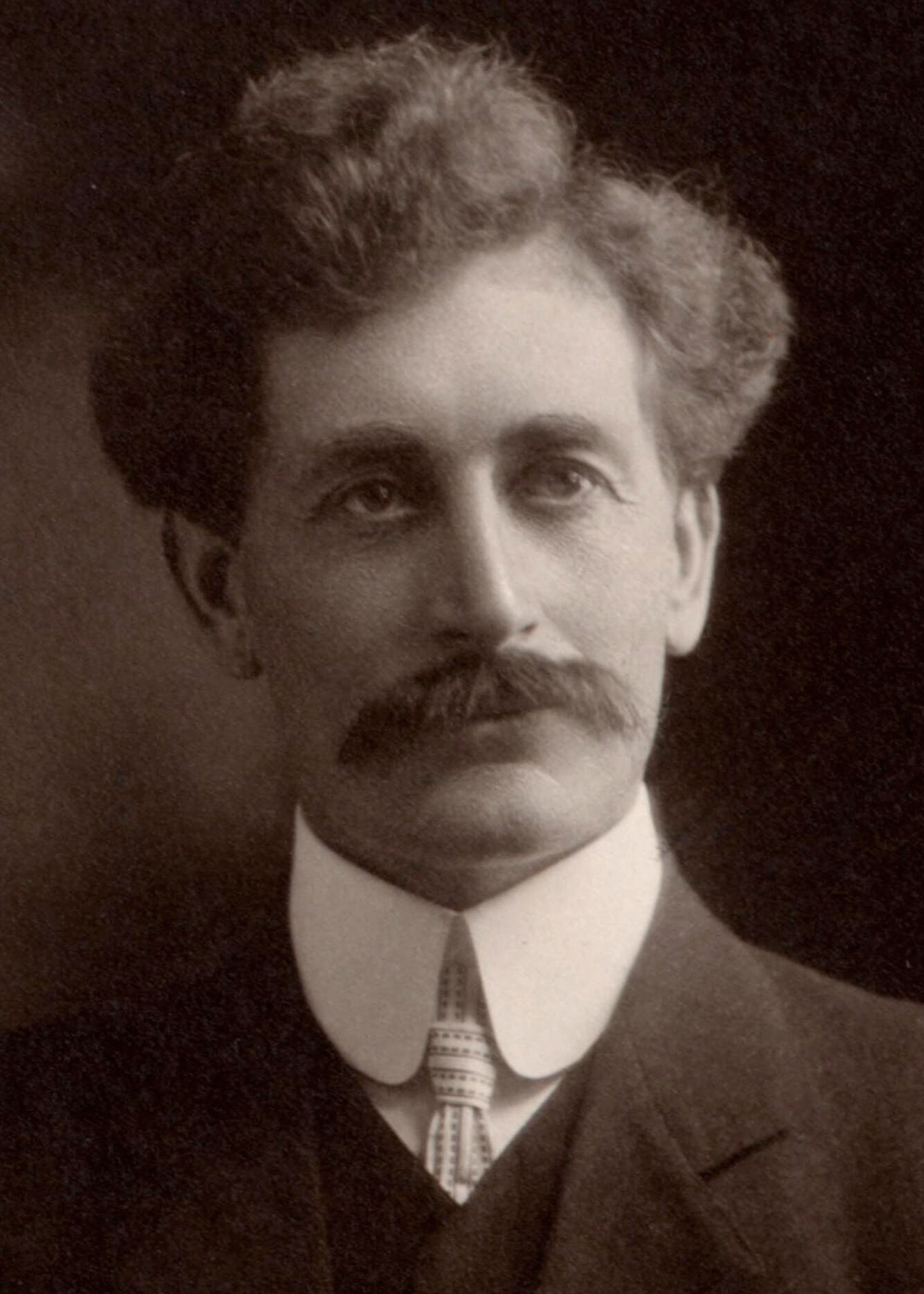

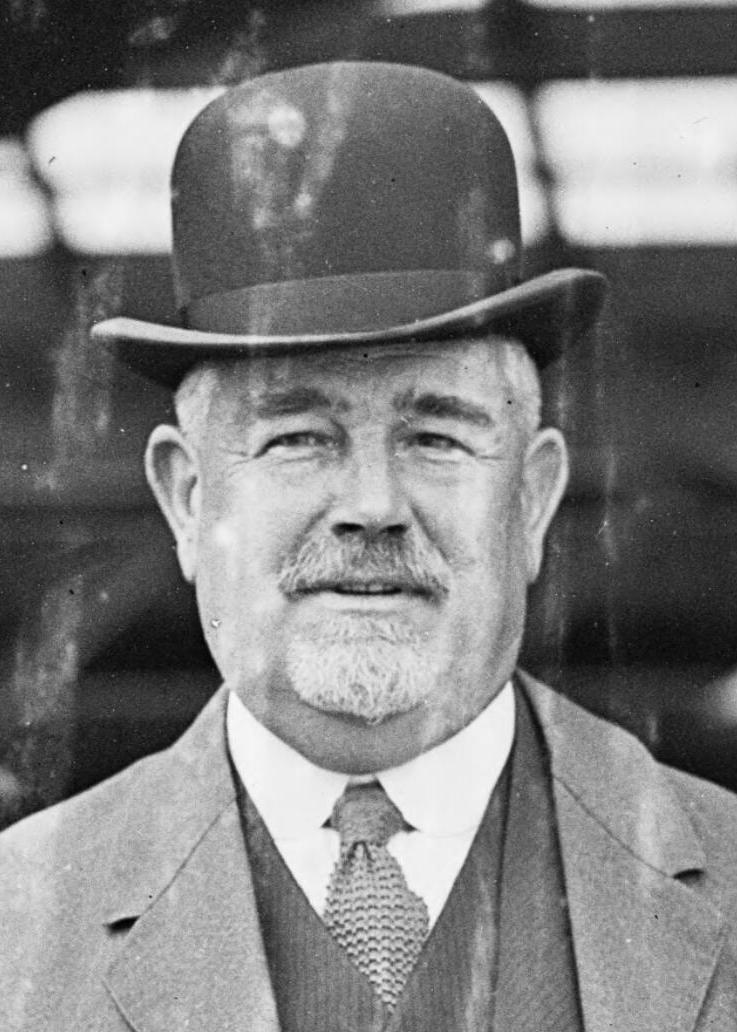
	First party	Second party
Candidate	Ernest Roberts	Alexander McLachlan
Party	Labour	Ind. Anti-Socialist
Popular vote	5,121	4,887
Percentage	51.17%	48.83%
Swing	▲51.17	▲48.83
MP before election
Charles Kingston
Protectionist
Elected MP
Ernest Roberts
Labour

A by-election was held for the Australian House of Representatives seat of Adelaide on 13 June 1908. This was triggered by the death of former Premier of South Australia and federal Protectionist Party MP Charles Kingston.

The by-election was won by Labor candidate Ernest Roberts, after the seat was previously won uncontested by Kingston at the 1903 and 1906 elections. Voting was not compulsory in 1908.

Alexander McLachlan was an independent Anti-Socialist Party candidate.

== Results ==
Adelaide by-election, 1908
Party	Candidate	Votes	%	±%
Labour	Ernest Roberts	5,121	51.17	+51.17
Ind. Anti-Socialist	Alexander McLachlan	4,887	48.83	+48.83
Total formal votes		10,008	99.40	N/A
Informal votes		60	0.60	N/A
Registered electors		29,874		
Turnout		10,068	33.70	N/A
Labour gain from Protectionist				

== See also ==
- List of Australian federal by-elections
