= George Byng Scott =

English-born Australian public servant

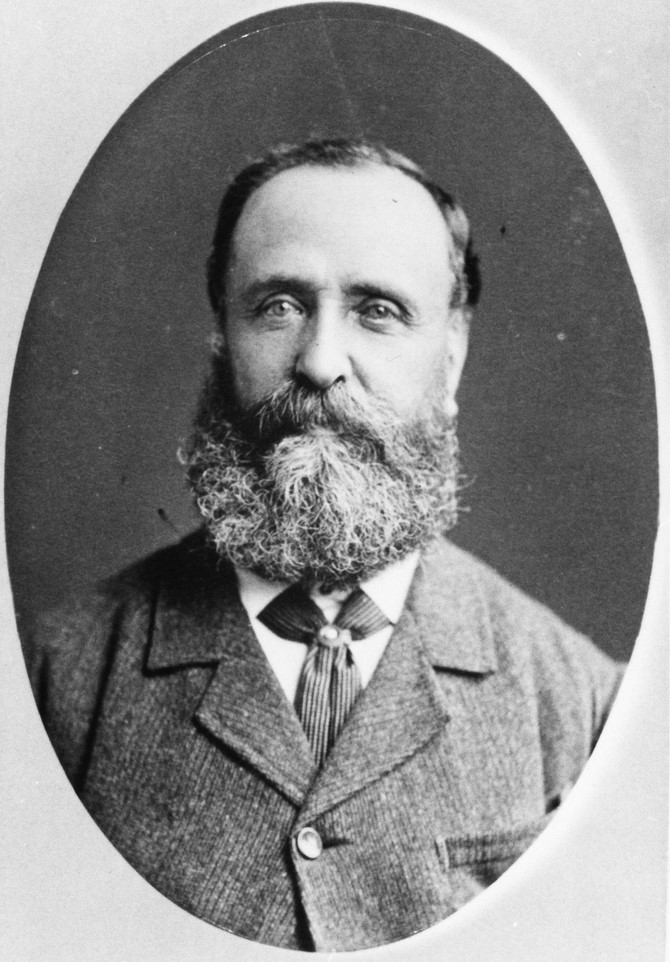

George Byng Scott (1824 – 17 February 1886) was an English-born Australian public servant, who served as Government Resident of the Northern Territory between 1873 and 1876.

== Career ==
Born in Gillingham, Kent, England in 1824, Scott moved to South Australia in 1846, initially working as a farmer near Morgan. After a further four years as a gold miner, first in California, United States and then in Bendigo, Victoria, Scott became the Inspector of Police for the South-Eastern District of South Australia. At the same time, he served as a stipendiary magistrate. In 1859, he moved to be a magistrate in Naracoorte.

From 6 October 1873 until 30 June 1876, Scott served as Government Resident of the Northern Territory. After his period in office, he returned to working as a stipendiary magistrate, first in Adelaide and then Mount Gambier. He continued in this latter role until his death on 17 February 1886.

== Personal life ==
Scott married twice and had 9 children. His first marriage was to Elizabeth née Taylor on 7 October 1843, with whom he had 2 children. Elizabeth died in November 1849. Scott remarried in July 1865, to Caroline née Ritchie. They had 7 children.

== Memorial ==
Scott Street in the Darwin suburb of Fannie Bay is named in his honour.

Government offices
Preceded by William Bloomfield Douglas	Government Resident of the Northern Territory; 1873–1876	Succeeded by Edward William Price
