= John Alexander Voules Brown =

Australian politician

John Alexander Voules Brown (8 January 1852 – 14 March 1945) was a South Australian businessman who represented the South Australian House of Assembly multi-member seat of Northern Territory from 1910 to 1911 for the Liberal Union.

== History ==
He was born the third or fourth son of William Voules Brown (1809 – 29 January 1893) and Harriet Brown, née Perkins (1812 – 6 July 1897) of Brighton, South Australia, who emigrated on the Coromandel in 1837.

In 1885 and 1886 he was a partner in the Darwin shipping firm of Adcock Brothers.

In 1887 his elder brother Victor Voules Brown (1841-1910) took over the business of Vaiben Louis Solomon, who ran "Solomon's Emporium", in an 1885 stone building on Smith Street, Darwin (at that time named Palmerston), and there conducted the business of the Port Darwin Mercantile and Agency Co., the Eastern and Australian Steamship Company, the Northern Territory Mining Exchange and the North Australian agency for Lloyd's of London. Brown worked there for his brother from 1887 to 1894. At some stage the building was renamed "Brown's Mart", and by that name today functions as a venue for live theatre.

In 1910 Bown was elected to the seat of Northern Territory, with Tom Crush as his colleague; the seat was dissolved in 1911 when the Commonwealth Government took over responsibility for the Territory.

Around 1920 Brown built a home "Wenlock" at 15 Jetty Road, Brighton, South Australia.

Around 1923 he sold a parcel of land and right-of-way to the trustees of St Jude's Church, Brighton, for use as a cemetery. The sale did not include the Brown family vault.

== Other interests ==
He was appointed to the Local Board of Health for Palmerston.

He was appointed J. P.

He was a board member of the South Australian School of Mines.

== Family ==
Note: It is useful to append dates to certain names in this family, as many members share identical names; not only father to son but also uncle to nephew.

J. A. V. Brown married Eleanor Johnson (1857 – 25 April 1918) in 1878. Among their children were:

- John Alexander Voules Brown, junior (14 July 1879 – 1962) married Mabel Florence Marks (c. 1886 – 20 March 1932) on 14 July 1909
- Victor Voules Brown (c. April 1885 – 1963) married Helen Dorothea Smith. The State Library of South Australia holds letters written by him from the front during World War I.
- Dorothy Eleanor Brown (1888–1954) married Albert Seary of Millswood on 10 February 1920
- Kathleen Mary Brown (1891–1965)

Older brothers include William Voules Brown (1839-1920) and Victor Voules Brown (1841-1910), Northern Territory businessman, who took over Solomon's Emporium to become Brown's Mart. Their sister Elizabeth Susannah Brown (1845-1926) married James Harvey (1843-1926) and moved to Salisbury, South Australia.
