= Samuel James Mitchell =

Australian politician

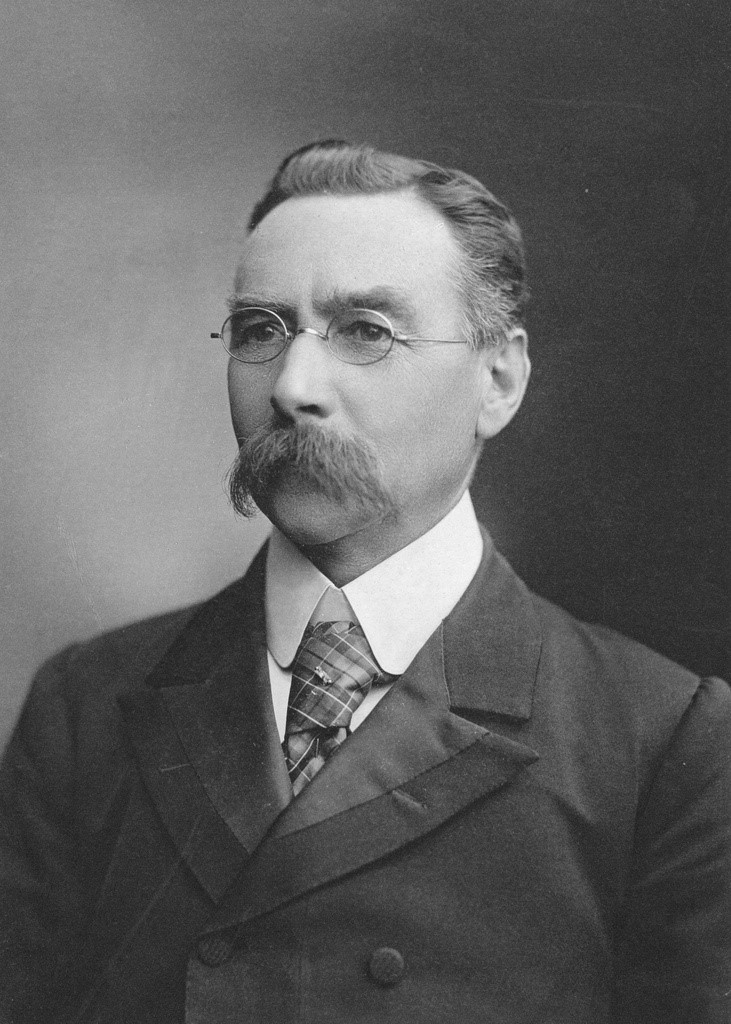

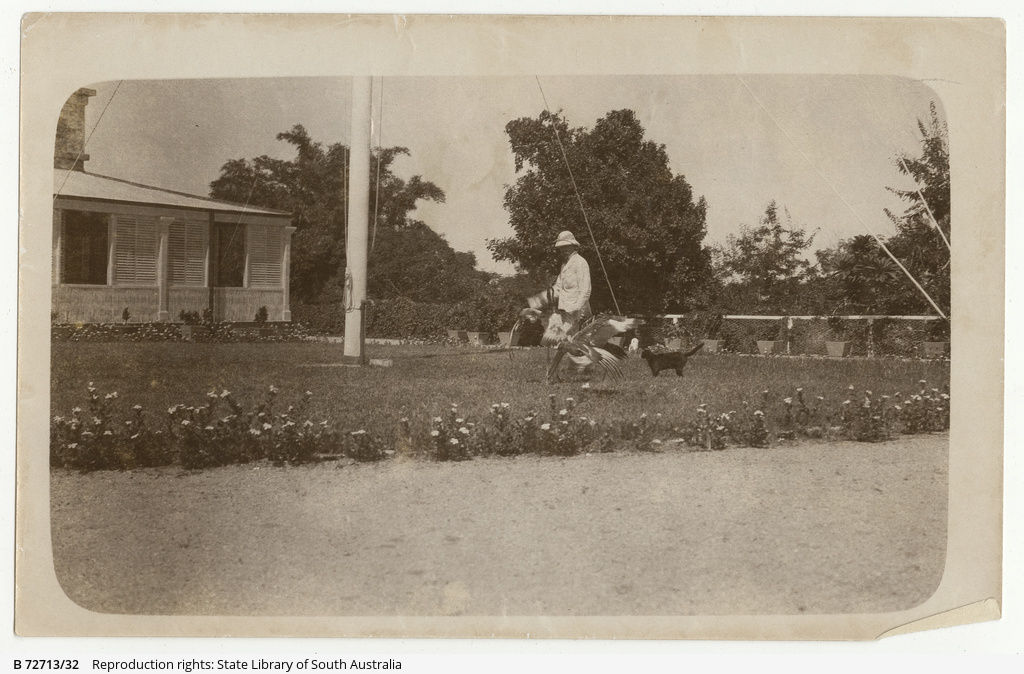
'Corner of Residency, Darwin 1910'. Judge Samuel James Mitchell near the flagpole, with jabiru and cat on the lawn

Samuel James Mitchell (11 May 1852 – 3 October 1926) was an Australian politician and judge. He was a member of the South Australian House of Assembly from 1901 to 1910, representing the Northern Territory. He was Government Resident of the Northern Territory and the inaugural judge of the Supreme Court of the Northern Territory from 1910 to 1912. He returned to South Australia after 1912, serving as a judge in various capacities until his death.

== Early life ==
Mitchell was born near Mount Barker in South Australia. He was educated at R. C. Mitton's Grammar school in Adelaide.

He worked at Mount Gambier and Melrose before moving to Port Augusta in 1871 and working as an auctioneer.

He was a Corporate Town of Port Augusta councillor and served as its mayor for two years before returning to Adelaide and working as a draper. He married Eliza Ann Gardner on 15 September 1875.

== Legal career ==
He became an articled clerk for Henry Edward Downer in 1885. Mitchell graduated from the University of Adelaide in 1890 and was admitted to the Bar and practised with Paris Nesbit QC and later Robert Ingleby QC.

== Politics ==
He was Mayor of Port Augusta for 2 years.

He stood unsuccessfully for parliament in 1900, but in 1901 won the House of Assembly seat for the Northern Territory. He was re-elected in 1902 and 1906 and was Attorney-General for 6 months from June 1909.

== Northern Territory judge ==
In 1910 with the transfer of the Northern Territory to Commonwealth control, he resigned to become the Government resident and the Northern Territory judge. In 1911 he helped to effect the transfer of control to the Commonwealth.

He remained Acting Administrator and Judge but resigned in 1912 after the Federal authorities would not make his appointment for life.

== Later life ==
He returned to South Australia and became a Stipendiary Magistrate and in 1916 transferred to the Adelaide Police Court. He was the first South Australian Judge of Insolvency from 1918 to 1926 and a Stipendiary Magistrate of the Adelaide Local Court and Taxation Appeal Court.

== Children and grandchildren with legal careers ==
His son Harold, born 11 August 1885, practised law for a short time in Renmark before joining the AIF. Lieutenant Mitchell died on 5 April 1918 and was buried at Millencourt Cemetery in France.

Dame Roma Mitchell, his grand daughter, born 2 October 1913 was Australia's first female Queen's Counsel in 1962 and first female judge in 1965. She later became Governor of South Australia in 1990, and is regarded as a pioneer of women's rights.

Civic offices
Preceded by Thomas Burgoyne	Mayor of Port Augusta; 1882–1883	Succeeded by J. C. Knipe
Political offices
Preceded by Archibald Peake	Attorney-General of South Australia; 1909	Succeeded by Hermann Homburg
Parliament of South Australia
Preceded by Vaiben Louis Solomon	Member for Northern Territory; 1901–1910; Served alongside: Herbert, Solomon, Crush	Succeeded by John Alexander Voules Brown
Government offices
Preceded by Charles Edward Herbert	Government Resident of the Northern Territory; 1910–1912	Extinct
