= William Bloomfield Douglas =

British colonial governor (1822–1906)

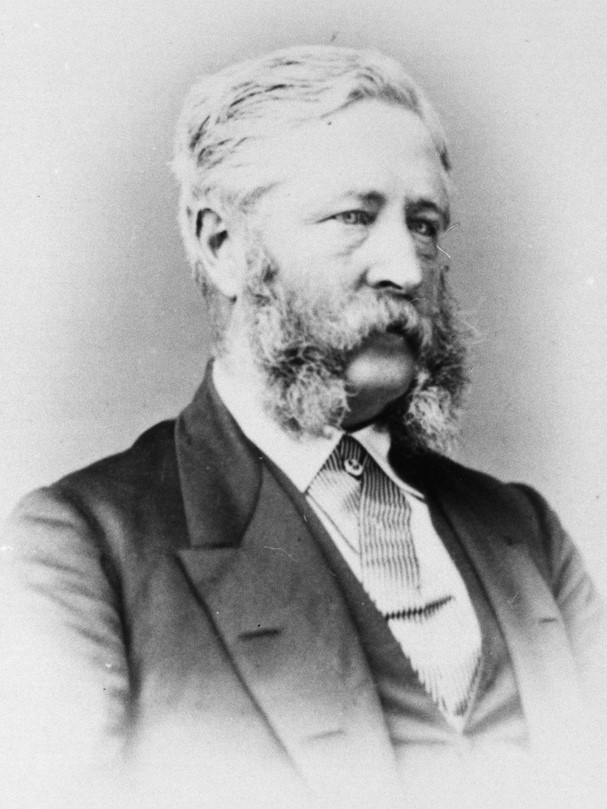
- Born: 25 September 1822; Aberystwyth
- Died: Halifax
- Occupations: Naval officer, harbourmaster, colonial administrator

William Bloomfield Douglas (25 September 1822 – 5 March 1906), generally known as Bloomfield Douglas or Captain Douglas, was a Welsh naval officer and public servant. During his career, he served in various positions in South Australia, including Government Resident of the Northern Territory (1870–1873), the Straits Settlements, including Acting Resident of Selangor (1875–1882), and Canada.

== Early life ==
Douglas was born on 25 September 1822 in the Welsh town of Aberystwyth. His parents were Richard William Clode Douglas and Mary née Johnson.

At the age of 19, Douglas joined the Royal Navy, serving as captain's steward aboard HMS Wolverine. He resigned from military service after 8 months, in September 1842, to become master of The Royalist and join his distant relation rajah James Brooke fighting pirates around Sarawak. He then joined the East India Company from 1844–1847. After this, he went back to England for five years and worked as a coastguard in Northumberland, he was in temporary command of HMRC Eagle c.1847-50; before returning to sea again.

== Career ==
=== Naval officer and harbourmaster ===
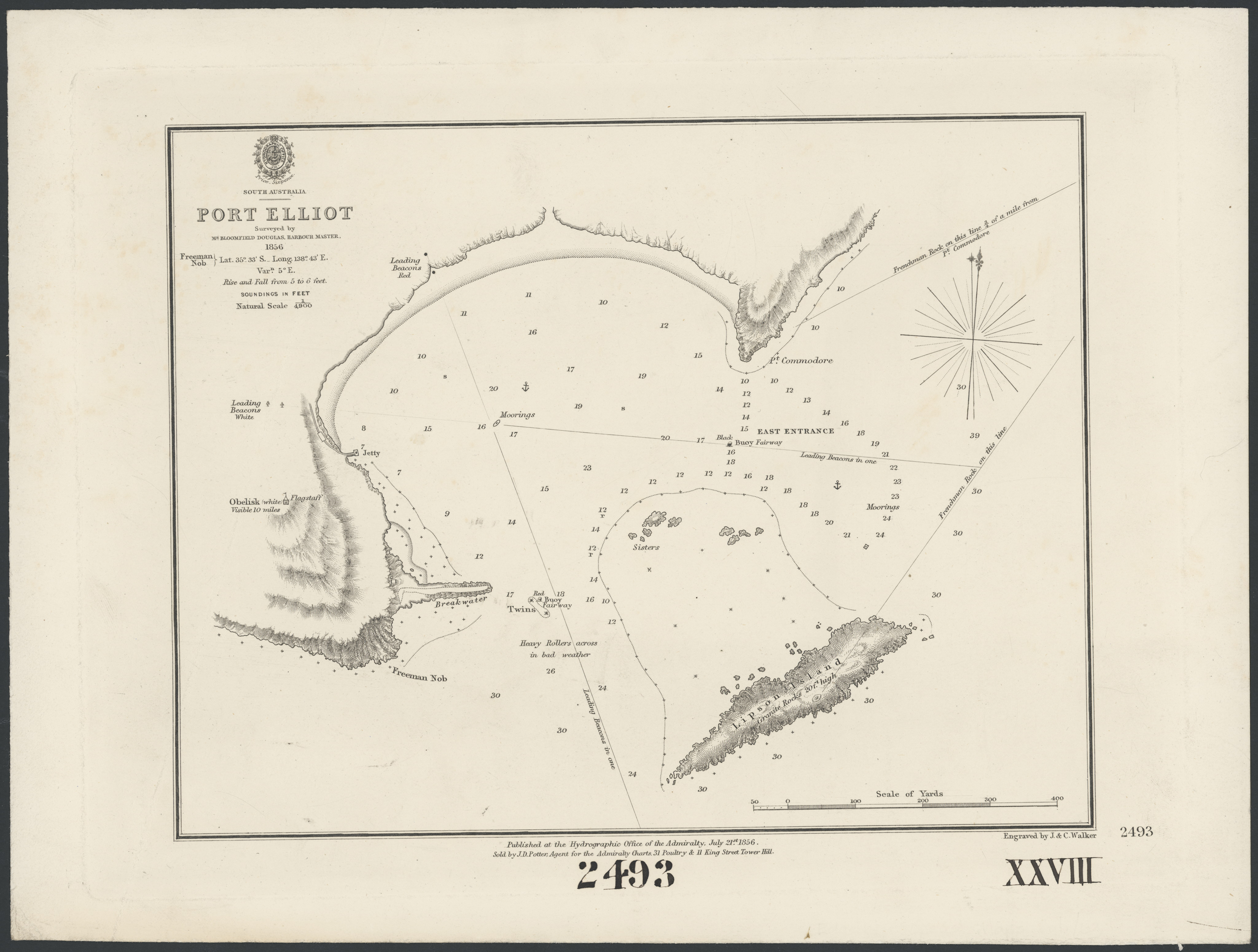
Admiralty Chart No 2493 South Australia, Port Elliot, Surveyed by Mr. Bloomfield Douglas, Harbour Master, 1856

In December 1854, Douglas took up the post of naval officer and harbourmaster in Adelaide, South Australia, having arrived there on the merchant ship Bosphorus. From July 1858, his responsibilities expanded to include Collector of Customs. During this time, he was also Master of Trinity House and chairman of the Harbour Trust. When, in 1860, these various posts were absorbed into a newly established Marine Board, Douglas was appointed its first president.

Between 1855 and 1858, Douglas also participated in official inquiries concerning lighthouses, harbours and defences in South Australia. In addition, he was responsible for surveying Kangaroo Island (1858), the Backstairs Passage (1858) and the mouth of the Murray River (1859). George de Mole was his draughtsman. In 1865 he was severely chastised by marine surveyor David MacLeod for planning a lighthouse to be erected on a submerged rock at great cost, when an exposed eminence was available nearby. Outside of his maritime activities, Douglas spent time as a stipendary magistrate, a member of the Immigration Board and an Inspector of Distilleries.

=== Government Resident ===
On 27 April 1870, Douglas was appointed by the South Australian government as Government Resident of the Northern Territory. Douglas had applied for the position unsuccessfully on two previous occasions, and politician John Hart, who helped him finally secure the job, was not convinced that Douglas was making a wise decision, commenting in his diary: "What a fool the man is".

Douglas had previously shown a weakness in the handling of money, and in his new position he was often responsible for extravagant spending, beginning with the construction of a large Residency which was often used to entertain guests using public money. He also encouraged a gold rush. His tendency to drink excessively became the subject of increasing concern, especially during certain incidents in 1873. In February of that year, for example, he was found in an inebriated state on the roof of his residency, threatening police officers with a gun. Attempts to introduce order into his administration were in vain, and he was made to resign in June at the request of commissioner Thomas Reynolds.

His daughter Harriet Douglas Daly travelled with him to Palmerston (Darwin) and wrote about her life there and her father's work in the book Digging, squatting and pioneering life in the Northern Territory of South Australia (1887).

=== Singapore and Selangor ===
In April 1874, the South Australian government gave Douglas a new task: to travel to Singapore to recruit gold miners for the Northern Territory. After successfully recruiting almost 200 individuals, he decided to stay in Singapore rather than return to Australia. He worked as a police magistrate for a short time before being appointed Acting Assistant Resident of Selangor in November 1875, and Acting Resident in April 1876. As had happened previously, various deficiencies affected Douglas's performance and led to criticism. This included an inability to control his temper, resulting in frequent arguments with Chinese and Malay officials. He faced significant criticism in an 1879 inquiry, which found a lack of organisation in the treasury and land offices. In another case, he was reprimanded when he failed to exercise caution in dealings with a Malay chief, such as punishing a chief too severely for bribery. He moved his headquarters to Kuala Lumpur in an attempt to remedy the situation, but was asked to resign in 1882 after further issues came to light.

=== Later life ===
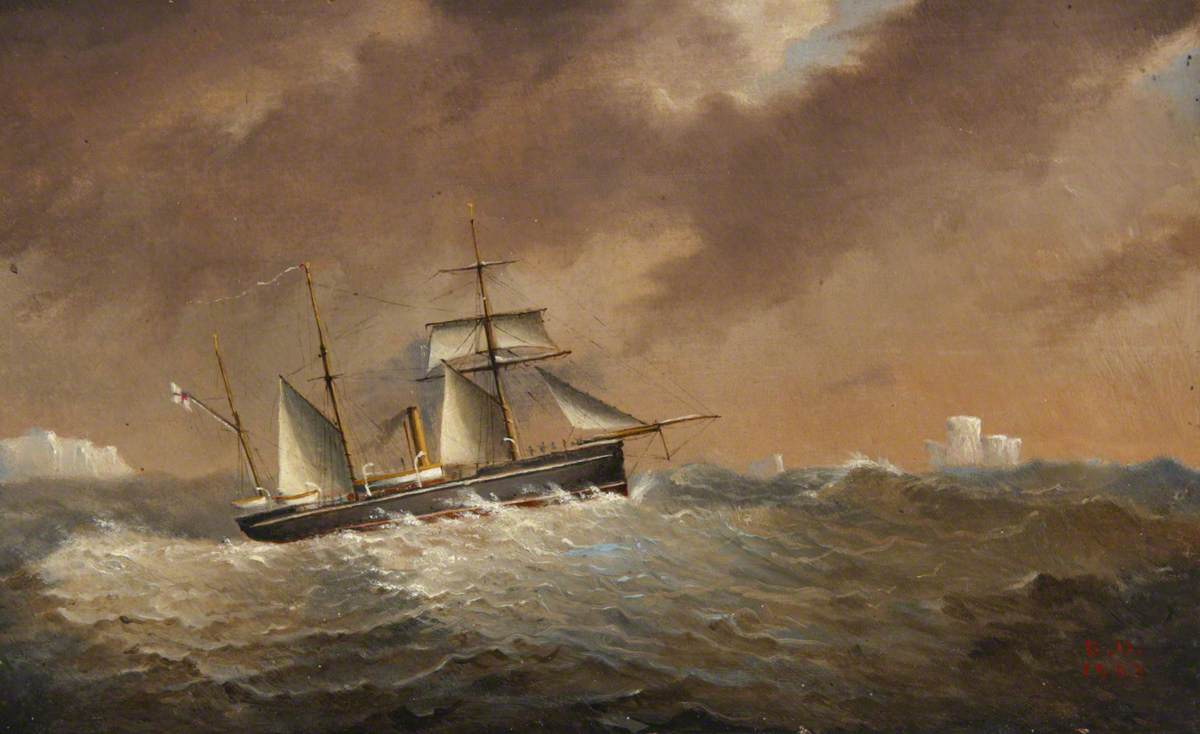
The gunboat HMS Goldfinch, by Bloomfield Douglas. A painting dated 1903.

In 1893 Douglas moved to Canada, where he worked for the Department of Marine and Fisheries, first in the tidal service and later as an examiner. When applying for this latter job, he lied about his age, claiming he was only 65 when he was in fact 74. Between 1900 and 1903, he worked in Halifax as a departmental inspector, before becoming an examiner again. He remained in this position until his death on 5 March 1906.

== Personal life ==
Douglas was married twice. His first marriage was to Ellen (née Atkinson) in April 1848, with whom he had eight children including a daughter with an intellectual disability. Ellen died in 1887. Douglas remarried in January 1899 to Annie Maude (née McDonald), the daughter of the collector of customs for Sydney, Nova Scotia.

== Bibliography ==
- Barr, Pat (1977). Taming the Jungle: The Men Who Made British Malaya. Secker & Warburg.
- Cross, Jack (2011). Great Central State: The Foundation of the Northern Territory. Wakefield Press. ISBN 978-1-86254-877-0.

Government offices
Preceded by Boyle Travers Finniss	Government Resident of the Northern Territory; 1870–1873	Succeeded by George Byng Scott
