= Robert Weddell =

Australian soldier and government administrator (1882–1951)

Robert Hunter Weddell (26 December 1882 – 23 November 1951) was an Australian soldier and government administrator, who served as Government Resident of North Australia and Administrator of the Northern Territory.

== Life and career ==
Weddell was born in Geelong, Victoria in 1882.

During World War I, Weddell served as a major in the 7th Battalion of the Australian Imperial Force. His period of service included being an officer at the Battle of Gallipoli in 1915, where he was the only officer from the front two companies who survived. He married Flora (née McDonald) in April 1916, while he was serving in the Armed Forces. He left the army in 1917.

In 1926, Weddell was appointed Government Resident of North Australia. In 1936, he moved to the role of Administrator of the Northern Territory. He retired from this post in 1937, as a result of difficulties arising from angina.

Weddell was called to military service in 1939, serving with the Australian Army Intelligence Corps in Melbourne. He retired from the army as a colonel in 1943.

Weddell died on 23 November 1951 at Malvern, Victoria. His wife outlived him, dying in October 1976.

== See also ==
- Weddell, Northern Territory
