= Administrator of the Northern Territory =

Representative of the Crown in Australia

- Badge of the Administrator
- Incumbent; David Connolly since 27 February 2026
- Office of the Administrator
- Style: His Honour the Honourable
- Residence: Government House, Darwin
- Seat: Darwin
- Appointer: Governor-General; on the advice of the Commonwealth Minister for Regional Development, Local Government and Territories, following consultation with the Northern Territory Chief Minister
- Term length: At the Governor-General's pleasure; (usually 5 years by convention)
- Formation: 12 June 1931
- First holder: John A. Gilruth
- Website: govhouse.nt.gov.au

The administrator of the Northern Territory is an official appointed by the governor-general of Australia to represent the Crown in right of the Northern Territory. (Note: The term The Crown is ambiguous. Relevantly here, the Crown may refer to the body politic, or the sovereign and the capacity in which they act. In the first sense, the Northern Territory was established "as a body politic under the Crown". In the second sense however, there is no legally distinct "Crown in right of the Northern Territory" from the federal Crown of Australia as the administrator's authority (as advised by Territory ministers) is derived from the Self Government Act (an act of the Commonwealth Parliament). This differs from the state governors, who represent directly the authority of the Crown, whose powers may be exercised according to the Australian Constitution. Academic Anne Twomey, in discussing the ambiguity notes that in Australia "the number of Crowns, in the sense of executive governments, may be different from the number of Crowns, in the sense of bodies politic, which in turn may be different from the number of Crowns the monarch might bear with respect to Australia.") They perform functions similar to those of a state governor.

Strictly speaking, the appointment of an administrator is made by the governor-general acting on the advice of the Australian government, rather than the advice of the government of the Northern Territory. However, ministers have described the process as being based on "advice from the Australian and Northern Territory governments". Unlike an Australian state governor, the administrator is not the direct representative of the King in the Territory but is instead appointed by the King's federal representative in Australia, the governor-general, to administer the Territory in accordance with the Act. In practice, however, the administrator performs a similar constitutional role to that of a state governor.

The administrator formally appoints the chief minister of the Northern Territory and the members of the Cabinet after every election. In all but a few cases, they are required by convention to act on the Cabinet's advice. The Administrator gives royal assent to all bills passed by the Northern Territory Legislative Assembly. Although the Governor-General (in practice, the Commonwealth Government) has the power to veto any territorial bill, in practice this right is almost never exercised.

The office of the deputy of the administrator was created in 1997.

In 2014, the governor-general granted current, future and living former administrators the title of The Honourable for life, following the lead of Governors-General and Governors of New South Wales in granting the title.

The present administrator is David Connolly.

== Crest of administrator ==
The crest of Administrator of the Northern Territory which is similar to the one used by the Governor-General of Australia except that the flower below the Crown is the Sturt Desert Rose, the floral emblem of the Northern Territory.

== South Australia (1863 to 1912) ==
On 6 July 1863, land now known as the Northern Territory was annexed to the Colony of South Australia. Legislation regulating the sale of land in the Northern Territory which was given assent on 12 November 1863 included provision for both the appointment of a Government Resident and a description of the powers of this office.

No.	Government Resident	From	To
1	Boyle Travers Finniss	3 March 1864	4 November 1865
(acting)	James Stokes Millner	January 1870	April 1870
2	William Bloomfield Douglas	27 April 1870	June 1873
(acting)	James Stokes Millner	June 1873	October 1873
3	George Byng Scott	6 October 1873	30 June 1876
4	Edward William Price	1 July 1876	6 March 1883
(acting)	Gilbert Rotherdale McMinn	March 1883	March 1884
5	John Parsons	19 March 1884	14 February 1890
6	John Knight	16 July 1890	10 January 1892
7	Charles James Dashwood	24 February 1892	31 January 1905
8	Charles Edward Herbert	1 February 1905	8 February 1910
9	Samuel Mitchell	1 April 1910	25 March 1912

== Commonwealth of Australia (1912 to present) ==
Administrators and Government Residents of the Northern Territory after transfer of control to the Commonwealth Government:

=== Administrators and Directors (1912 to 1927) ===
No.	Name	Title	From	To
1	John Gilruth	Administrator	25 March 1912	20 February 1919 (de facto) (Note: Gilruth left the territory on 20 February 1919 following the Darwin rebellion of December 1918. He was granted six months of leave from 1 June 1919 and his appointment was formally terminated on 30 November 1919, although he had exercise no control over the territory since his departure.)
1	John Gilruth	Administrator	25 March 1912	30 November 1919 (de jure)
2	Henry Ernest Carey	Director	1 August 1919	19 October 1919 (de facto) (Note: Carey was appointed to the new post of Director of the Northern Territory for a three-year term from 1 August 1919. He left the territory on 19 October 1919 alongside the chief judge David Bevan and government secretary R. J. Evans, following threats to their safety. His appointment was not formally terminated until 22 September 1920.)
2	Henry Ernest Carey	Director	1 August 1919	22 September 1920 (de jure)
3	Staniforth Smith	Acting Administrator	1 December 1919	17 January 1921
4	Frederic Urquhart	Administrator	17 January 1921	1 March 1927

=== Government Residents (1927 to 1931) ===
From 1926 to 1931, the Northern Territory was divided into the territories of Central Australia and North Australia, with the border at the 20th parallel south. Each territory was administered by a Government Resident located respectively in Alice Springs (then known as Stuart) and in Darwin. Both territories were reincorporated as the Northern Territory in 1931.

No.	Government Resident (North Australia)	From	To
1	Robert Weddell	1 March 1927	12 June 1931

No.	Government Resident (Central Australia)	From	To
1	John Cawood	1 March 1927	11 December 1929
2	Victor Carrington	11 December 1929	12 June 1931

=== Administrators (1931 to present) ===
No.	Administrator	From	To
1	Robert Weddell	12 June 1931	29 March 1937
2	Aubrey Abbott	29 March 1937	1 July 1946
3	Arthur Driver	1 July 1946	1 July 1951
4	Frank Wise	1 July 1951	1 July 1956
5	James Archer	1 July 1956	1 April 1961
6	Roger Nott	1 April 1961	1 October 1964
7	Roger Dean	1 October 1964	4 March 1970
8	Frederick Chaney	4 March 1970	10 December 1973
9	Jock Nelson	10 December 1973	12 November 1975
10	John England	1 June 1978	1 January 1981
11	Commodore Eric Johnston	1 January 1981	1 July 1989
12	James Muirhead	1 July 1989	1 March 1993
13	Austin Asche	1 March 1993	17 February 1997
14	Neil Conn	17 February 1997	28 November 2000
15	John Anictomatis	28 November 2000	30 October 2003
16	Ted Egan	31 October 2003	31 October 2007
17	Tom Pauling	31 October 2007	31 October 2011
18	Sally Thomas	31 October 2011	10 November 2014
19	John Hardy	10 November 2014	30 October 2017
20	Vicki O'Halloran	31 October 2017	30 January 2023
21	Hugh Heggie	2 February 2023	30 January 2026
22	David Connolly	27 February 2026	present

== Deputy of the Administrator (1997 to present) ==
The office of the Deputy of the Administrator was established in 1997.

No.	Deputy of the Administrator	From	To
1	Minna Sitzler	17 February 1997	30 November 2001
2	Pat Miller	20 September 2002	
3	Fran Kilgariff	15 February 2024	present

== See also ==
- Government House, Darwin
- Governors of the Australian states
- Darwin Rebellion
- Officer administering the government
