= Edward William Price =

His Honour Edward William Price

Government Resident of the Northern Territory
- In office 1 July 1876 – 6 March 1883
- Monarch: Victoria
- Preceded by: George Byng Scott
- Succeeded by: John Langdon Parsons

Personal details
- Born: 1832 Dublin, United Kingdom
- Died: 1893 (aged 60–61) London, United Kingdom
- Spouse: Mina Hamilton

Edward William Price (1832 – 14 November 1893) was an Irish-born Australian civil servant, who served as Government Resident of the Northern Territory between 1876 and 1883.

== Life and career ==
Price was born in Dublin, Ireland in 1832. He joined the Royal Navy in 1851, serving initially as a midshipman aboard HMS Ajax. During the Crimean War, he was a member of the crew of HMS Simoon. For his service, he was awarded the British Crimean War Medal and the Turkish Crimean War Medal. He asked to be discharged in 1856, and this request was granted.

Price moved to South Australia in 1859, and became a civil servant the following year. He spent several years working as a court clerk, initially for Gawler Town Local Court and later for the Police Court at Adelaide. In 1873, he was appointed a Justice of the Peace and Special Magistrate for South Australia.

Price married Mina Hamilton, a fellow Irish emigrant, on 6 November 1860 in Adelaide. They had six children. Price's wife and children all died together in 1875 when a ship they were travelling on, the SS Gothenburg, was wrecked off the coast of Queensland.

On 1 July 1876, Price was appointed Government Resident of the Northern Territory, succeeding George Byng Scott. He remained in this position until 6 March 1883. During his tenure, he was a prominent proponent of Christian values, especially on the issue of alcohol. He also started a Church of England congregation in the Residency, partly funded by the Society for the Propagation of the Gospel.

After resigning from his position as Government Resident, he travelled to London aboard SS Bowen. He died in London on 14 November 1893.

Government offices
| Preceded by George Byng Scott | Government Resident of the Northern Territory; 1876–1883 | Succeeded by John Langdon Parsons |
