= Walter Griffiths (politician) =

Australian politician

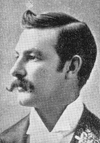
Walter Griffiths

Walter Griffiths (4 July 1867 – 4 September 1900) was a politician in the Northern Territory of Australia. He was a member of the South Australian House of Assembly from 1893 to 1900, representing the Northern Territory electorate.

== Background ==
Born in Kent Town, South Australia, the son of Frederick Griffiths, a wealthy ironmonger, and his wife Helen, née Giles, Griffiths attended St Aloysius College and Saint Peter's College in Adelaide.

Aged fifteen Griffiths moved to Yam Creek in the Northern Territory to work for his uncle William Griffiths, a mine owner, before becoming a business partner of Vaiben Louis Solomon in mining ventures in the Northern Territory and the Western Australian goldfields, co-owned the Northern Territory Times and became a prominent member of the Kalgoorlie Chamber of Mines.

On his uncle's death in 1892, Griffiths took over the business, retaining his association with Solomon, who in 1890, had become one of the two members for the Electoral district of Northern Territory in the South Australian House of Assembly. At the 1893 South Australian election Griffiths was elected, along with Solomon, to the Northern Territory seat. Aged 25, Griffiths was the youngest member of the House.

As member for the Northern Territory, Griffiths travelled large distances, including horseback between Maree (where the train line from Adelaide ended) to Palmerston, and visiting other remote areas of his electorate by camel and horse.

Griffiths was strongly opposed to Asian immigration, believing that jobs would be taken away from locals, and women's suffrage, arguing that women could not be taken "down from the pedestal upon which she was placed into the pitch of politics". Griffiths lobbied heavily against women's suffrage in South Australia and the Northern Territory. While the suffrage bill succeeded, Griffiths was comfortably re-elected at the subsequent election.

Heavily involved in the Federation issue, Griffiths campaigned heavily throughout the goldfields for Western Australia to join the Commonwealth of Australia. Following the refusal of the Government of Western Australia to hold a referendum on Federation, in December 1899 Griffiths helped form the Eastern Goldfields Reform League. The League gathered signatures for a petition to be presented to Queen Victoria seeking the creation of a new Australian state called Auralia, which would then join the federation. Griffiths travelled to London in early 1900 to present the petition and lobby the British government to either agree to the creation of Auralia or force Western Australia to federate.

Following the refusal of senior British figures to meet with him, Griffiths left London only when advised that Premier of Western Australia Sir John Forrest had agreed to a referendum on federation.

While he was still in England, The South Australian Government appointed Griffiths a Special Commissioner on mining matters, but within a few weeks of his arrival back in Adelaide in late June, Griffiths was diagnosed with typhoid fever. He died at Miss Tibbitt's Private Hospital in Adelaide on 4 September 1900, aged 33. An obituary stated

in the untimely death of Mr. Walter Griffiths, in the prime of life, this settlement has lost the services of a clever, shrewd, representative, whatever may have been his faults or weaknesses, always fairly and squarely did his best to carry out the duties he had undertaken to perform is his capacity as one of the members for the Northern Territory.
