= Alexander McLachlan (politician) =

Australian politician

The Honourable Alexander McLachlan
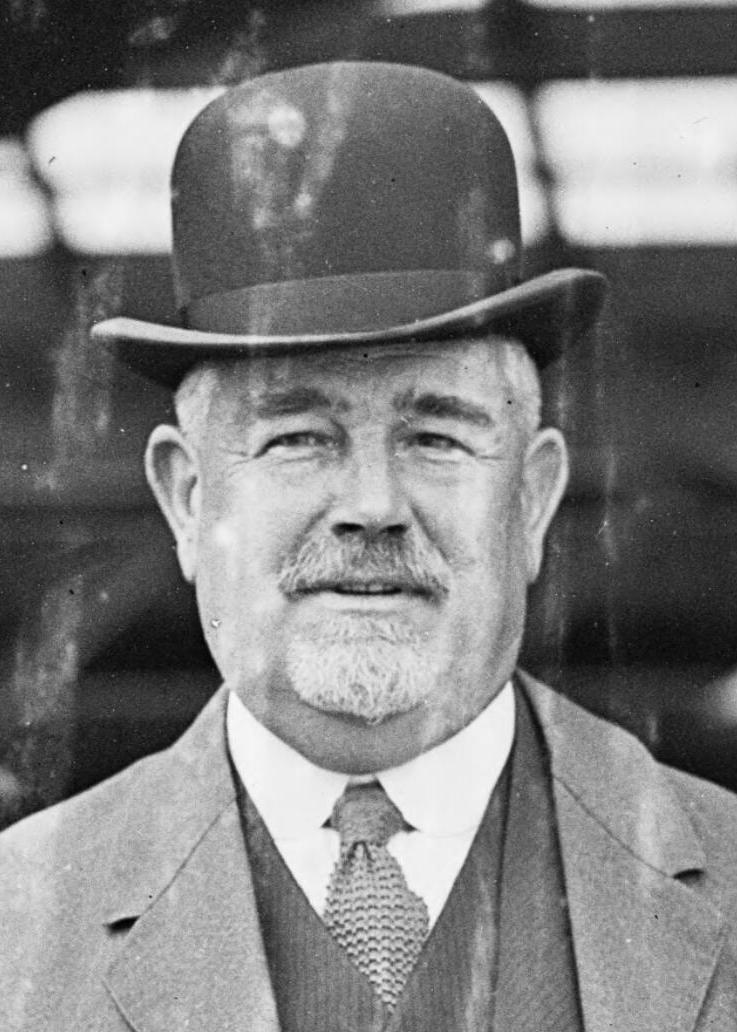

Leader of the Government in the Senate
- In office 29 November 1937 – 7 November 1938
- Preceded by: George Pearce
- Succeeded by: George McLeay

Postmaster-General of Australia
- In office 12 October 1934 – 7 November 1938
- Prime Minister: Joseph Lyons
- Preceded by: Archdale Parkhill
- Succeeded by: Archie Cameron

Senator for South Australia
- In office 24 February 1926 – 30 June 1944
- Preceded by: Sir John Newlands
- Succeeded by: Theo Nicholls

Personal details
- Born: 2 November 1872 Narracoorte, South Australia
- Died: 28 May 1956 (aged 83) East Melbourne, Victoria, Australia
- Party: Nationalist (to 1931); UAP (from 1931)
- Spouse: Cecia Billiet (m. 1898)
- Occupation: Lawyer

Alexander John McLachlan (2 November 1872 – 28 May 1956) was an Australian politician. He served as a Senator for South Australia from 1926 to 1944, representing the Nationalist Party and United Australia Party. He held ministerial office in the Lyons government as Vice-President of the Executive Council (1932–1934), Minister in charge of Development and Scientific and Industrial Research (1932–1937), and Postmaster-General of Australia (1934–1938).

== Early life ==
McLachlan was born on 2 November 1872 in Naracoorte, South Australia. He was the son of Mary (née Patterson) and Alexander McLachlan. His parents were Scottish immigrants from the Western Highlands and spoke Scottish Gaelic. His mother "read the Gaelic Bible to him each night and taught him Gaelic songs".

McLachlan was raised on his father's sheep-farming property at Naracoorte and received his early education at home. He later attended Hamilton Academy, a private school in Hamilton, Victoria, before completing his secondary education at Mount Gambier High School. McLachlan went on to study law as an articled clerk, initially with Davison and Daniel in Mount Gambier from 1890 and then with Eustace B. Grundy's firm in Adelaide. He completed a certificate in law at the University of Adelaide and was called to the South Australian Bar in 1895.

In 1895, McLachlan established a legal practice in Gladstone, moving to Petersburg in the same year. He developed a friendship with South Australian premier Charles Kingston and in 1897 moved to Adelaide to become a partner in Kingston's firm. Due to Kingston's political obligations he took on the majority of the firm's work. Their partnership ended in 1905 and McLachlan subsequently took on several other partners, including Mellis Napier.

== Political career ==
=== Early candidacies ===
McLachlan ran unsuccessfully for election for the seat of Victoria in 1896 and for Adelaide in 1912 in the South Australian House of Assembly. He also ran unsuccessfully for the Legislative Council in 1905, the Australian House of Representatives seat of Adelaide in 1908 and 1910 and for the Senate in 1922.

McLachlan was one of the founders of the Liberal Union in 1910, a merger of local liberal organisations. He succeeded Joseph Vardon as president of the party in 1913, serving until 1916. He was later involved with the eventual merger of the Liberal Union and the National Party to form the new Liberal Federation in 1923.

=== Senate ===
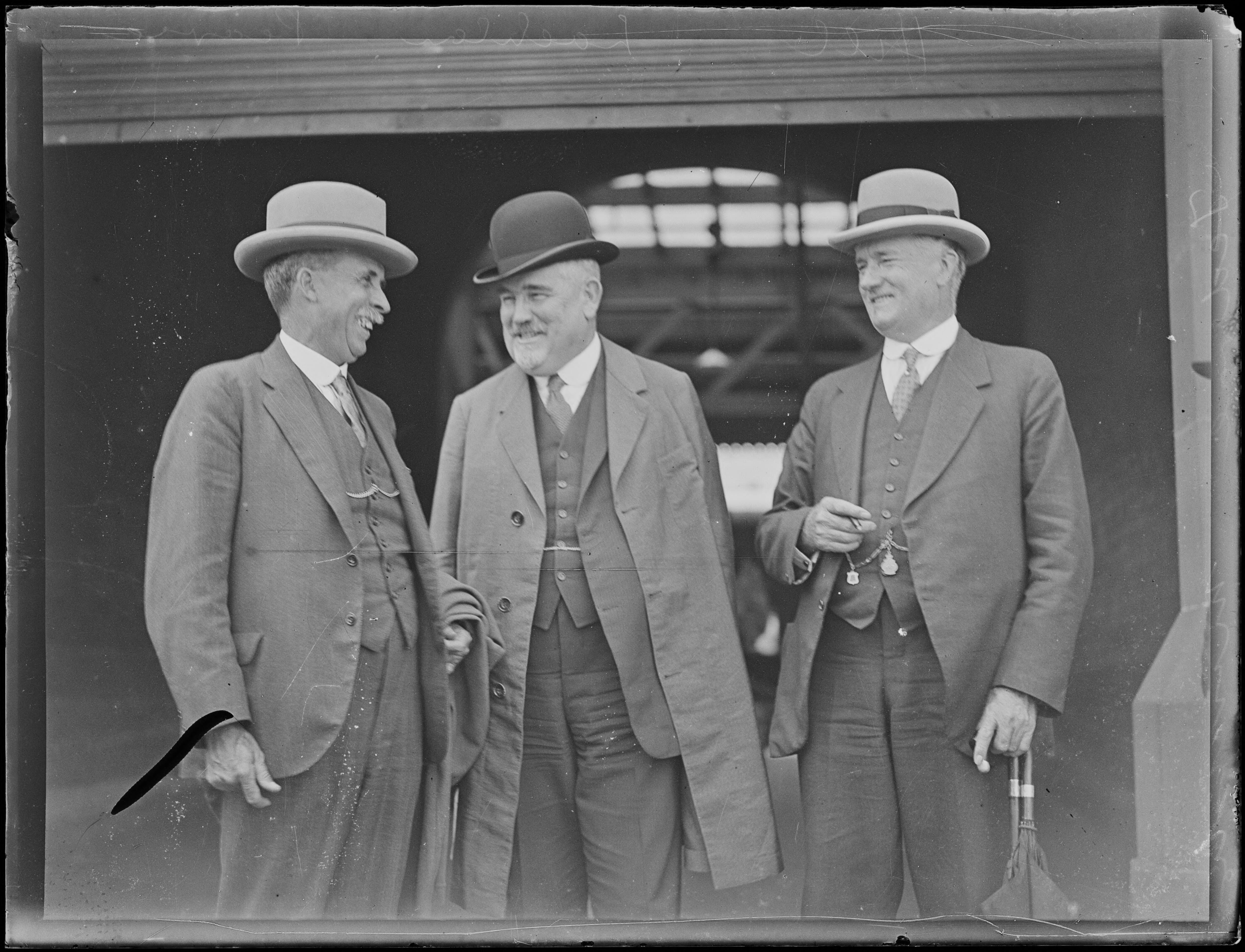
McLachlan (centre) in 1927 with George Pearce and William Caldwell Hill

In the 1925 elections, he was finally elected to the Senate as a Nationalist, although he in fact filled a casual vacancy in January 1926, prior to the commencement of his term in July. He was an honorary minister in the Bruce ministry from July 1926, often acting for absent ministers. He represented Australia at the meeting of the League of Nations in 1928 and signed the Kellogg-Briand Pact. He was Vice-President of the Executive Council from 1932 to 1934 in the Lyons government and Minister in charge of Development and Scientific and Industrial Research (responsible for the Council of Scientific and Industrial Research) from 1932 to 1937. From 1934 to 1938, he was Postmaster-General and issued many licences for commercial radio stations.

McLachlan became an outspoken advocate of military preparedness and supported sanctions against Italy in response to its invasion of Ethiopia, antagonising cabinet. He also pressed Lyons over his unwillingness to put into place the provisions of the National Health and Pensions Insurance Act 1938. On 3 November 1938, McLachlan was questioned in parliament over the letting of a contract by the Postmaster-General's Department to the Hume Pipe Co. Lyons' lukewarm defence caused McLachlan to resign as Postmaster-General the same day.

McLachlan remained on the backbench following his resignation from cabinet. During World War II he was chairman of the Joint Committee on War Expenditure from 1941 to 1944 and also served on the Regulations and Ordinances Committee. He unsuccessfully sought Liberal and Country League preselection for a further Senate term prior to the 1943 federal election, but recorded only eight out of 200 votes from preselectors. His final Senate term expired on 30 June 1944.

== Personal life ==
In 1898, McLachlan married Cecia Antoinette Billiet; the couple had no children. They lived in Melbourne from the late 1920s, also acquiring a small grazing property near South Morang. He was widowed in 1941 and died on 28 May 1956 at the Mercy Hospital in East Melbourne. His estate was valued for probate at £128,160 (equivalent to $4,700,000 in 2022) and was divided between three nephews.

McLachlan was active in the Scottish-Australian community, serving as chief of the South Australian Caledonian Society from 1899 to 1902. He was the first commanding officer of the Scottish Corps, a kilt-wearing Scottish regiment established in Adelaide in 1899. He was also chairman of a committee to memorialise Scottish-Australian explorer John McDouall Stuart, and in 1904 unveiled a statue of Stuart in Victoria Square, Adelaide.

McLachlan played golf, bridge and billiards and was interested in horse racing. He was chairman of the South Australian Football League from 1920 to 1925. He was also a "connoisseur of antiques and had a fine collection of silver". In 1948 he published an autobiography titled McLachlan: An F.A.Q. Australian.

== Notes ==
Political offices
New title	Minister in charge of Development and Scientific and Industrial Research; 1932–1937	Abolished
Preceded by John Barnes	Vice-President of the Executive Council; 1932–1934	Succeeded by Billy Hughes
Preceded by Archdale Parkhill	Postmaster-General; 1934–1938	Succeeded by Archie Cameron
Party political offices
Preceded by George Pearce	Leader of the United Australia Party in the Senate; 1937–1938	Succeeded by George McLeay
