= Thomas Crush =

Australian politician

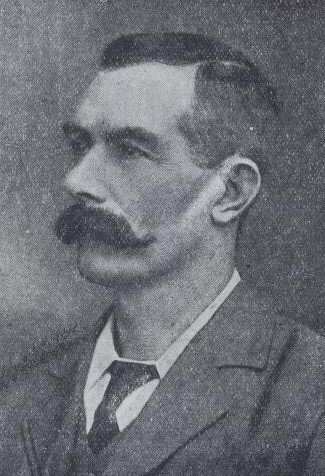

Thomas George Crush (1865 – 27 August 1913) was an Australian politician who represented the Electoral district of Northern Territory in the South Australian House of Assembly from 1908 until the removal of the Northern Territory from South Australian jurisdiction.

Born in Plaistow, Essex, the son of William Henry Crush, Crush worked as a teacher in Essex before moving to Australia in 1888, where he worked a number of different jobs around Australia, and eventually settled in the Northern Territory at Wandi, near Pine Creek in 1897 to work a goldmine.

Crush married local identity Fannie Cody (a suffragette known as "Fighting Fannie") on 3 August 1898 and together they built the Federation Hotel at Brock's Creek, while becoming involved in local issues. In May 1901, Crush founded and became secretary of the Brocks Creek branch of the North Australian League, which fought for local issues. Following the 1908 death of Vaiben Louis Solomon, one of the two members for the Northern Territory in the South Australian House of Assembly, Crush successfully stood as a Labor candidate in the resulting by-election, becoming the first successful Labor candidate (and the second candidate over all) in the Northern Territory.

When Crush first arrived in Adelaide, there was speculation about his political leanings despite his election on the Labor ticket due to so little being known about him and the fact he had not signed the Labor pledge.

In parliament, Crush pushed for Northern Territory-related issues, like the direction of the Darwin to Adelaide railway and, with Fannie's help, was comfortably re-elected at the 1910 South Australian legislative election, with John Alexander Voules Brown as his colleague. In 1911, the Northern Territory was moved from South Australian to federal administration, leading to the abolition of the Northern Territory electorate. Crush believed it would only be a short time before the Northern Territory was granted political representation in the Parliament of Australia and declared his intention to run at the federal election.

However, Crush's health began to deteriorate and after a lengthy stay at Darwin Hospital, he died of heart failure on 27 August 1913, aged about 48. Called "a fluent and quietly convincing speaker" and gaining recognition for his "unassuming good nature and sincerity" around Adelaide, South Australian Labor colleagues erected a memorial to him at his burial place in the Darwin Pioneer Cemetery.
