= James Henderson Howe =

Australian politician

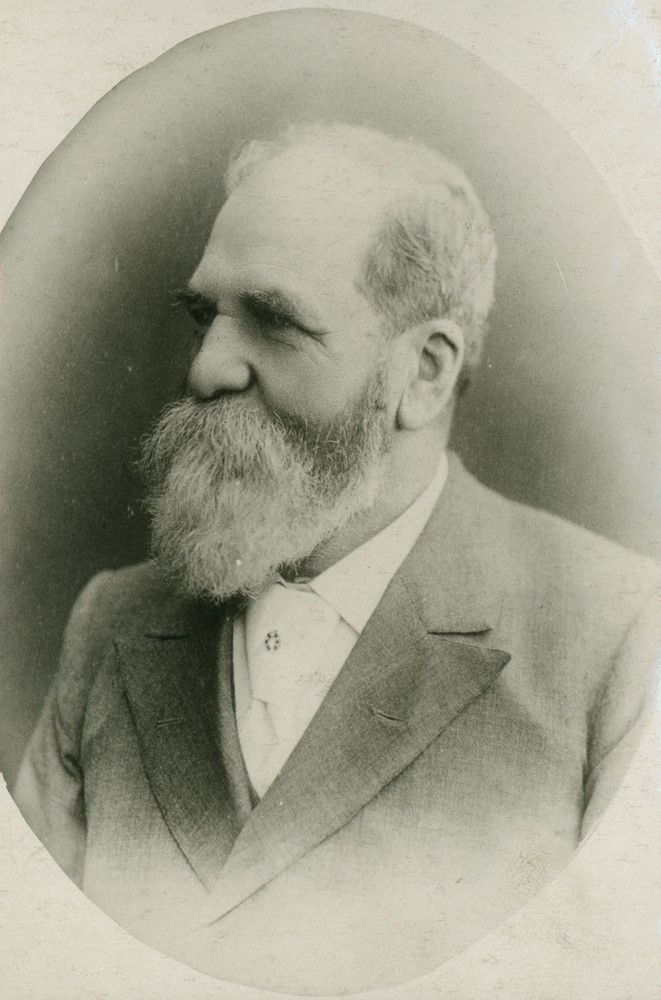

James Henderson Howe (4 March 1839 – 5 February 1920), was a Scots-born mounted policeman, farmer and politician in South Australia.

== History ==
Howe was born in Forfar, Forfarshire, Scotland, the son of James H. Howe and his wife Elizabeth, née Inverwick. and emigrated to South Australia at around age 17, and before age 18 was admitted to the mounted police force, a job which took him all over the colony, and introduced him to such explorers as John McDouall Stuart. He retired from the police force to go into business in Gawler, where he was associated with leading industrialist James Martin. In 1876 he took up farming at Mambray Park, and helped set up a Farmers' Association.

Howe entered politics when a couple of vacancies arose in the South Australian House of Assembly seat of Stanley following the death of G. S. Kingston and the resignation of Charles Mann. Howe stood for the seat in conjunction with Alfred Catt; both were elected. He represented Stanley from 27 April 1881 to 1 April 1884; and Gladstone from 2 April 1884 to 24 April 1896. Howe was Commissioner of Public Works in the Downer Ministry from June 1885 to June 1887. He was also Commissioner of Crown Lands and Immigration in this period, when animosity between him and Professor Custance of Roseworthy Agricultural College resulted in the latter's summary dismissal. He resumed the Crown Lands and Immigration portfolio in the Cockburn cabinet from June 1889 until May 1890, when he succeeded Thomas Burgoyne as Minister of Lands, holding that office till July 1890, when he resigned.

Howe was elected to the South Australian Legislative Council for Northern District on 22 May 1897 and held that seat until 5 April 1918. He was a member of the Caledonian Society of South Australia, and its Chief 1886–1887. He was an old friend of John Moule.

He was particularly remembered for his work in establishing the School of Mines, and his life-long support of that institution. A son, Alexander Maxwell Howe (1878 – 14 August 1934), was one of its earliest graduates and went on to have a successful career in mining and metallurgy. He was a member of the Federal Convention in 1897, and is credited with making the age pension a Commonwealth responsibility.

Howe died at his home of 30 years, "Mambray", Fifth Avenue, St. Peters, Adelaide on 5 February 1920; his wife Harriette, née Keynes, died there on 27 March 1908. They were survived by two sons and four daughters. His daughter Helen Gertrude Howe (1883–1953) married Udo Waldemar Seppelt (1879–1964), son of winemaker Benno Seppelt, on 26 October 1905.

Political offices
Preceded by Alfred Catt	Commissioner of Public Works; 1889–1890	Succeeded by Thomas Burgoyne
