= Vaiben Louis Solomon =

Australian politician

The Honourable Vaiben Louis Solomon
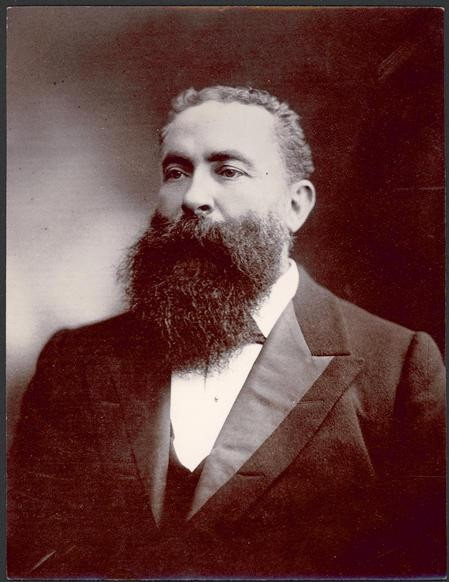

21st Premier of South Australia
- In office 1 December 1899 – 8 December 1899
- Monarch: Victoria
- Governor: Sir Thomas Buxton
- Preceded by: Charles Kingston
- Succeeded by: Frederick Holder

13th Leader of the Opposition (SA)
- In office 1899–1899
- Preceded by: John Downer
- Succeeded by: Frederick Holder
- In office 1899–1901
- Preceded by: Frederick Holder
- Succeeded by: Robert Homburg

Member of the Australian Parliament for South Australia
- In office 30 March 1901 – 16 December 1903 Serving with Lee Batchelor, Langdon Bonython, Paddy Glynn, Frederick Holder, Charles Kingston, Alexander Poynton
- Preceded by: New seat
- Succeeded by: Division abolished

Personal details
- Born: 13 May 1853 Adelaide, South Australia
- Died: 20 October 1908 (aged 55)
- Party: Conservatives; Free Trade (1901–03)

Vaiben Louis Solomon (13 May 1853 – 20 October 1908) was the 21st Premier of South Australia and a member of the first Australian Commonwealth parliament. He was generally known by his full name – perhaps to distinguish him from his uncle, Vaiben Solomon (1802 – 21 June 1860), who was transported with his brother Emanuel Solomon to New South Wales in 1818 for larceny and became a wealthy pastoralist of Horningsea Park.

== History ==
Solomon was born in Adelaide, South Australia, the son of Judah Moss Solomon, a member of the South Australian Legislative Council and Lord Mayor of Adelaide from 1869 to 1870. His education began at J. L. Young's Adelaide Educational Institution, and continued at Scotch College, Melbourne. He then returned to Adelaide, where he was employed at the warehouse of Donaldson, Andrews and Sharland, and subsequently to the Solomon Cousins "Nimble Ninepence" shop in Kapunda, where he developed his talent for amateur theatricals. He returned to Adelaide, where he worked at the Stock Exchange. Vaiben wished to marry Mary Ann Wigzell (c. June 1856 – 7 January 1885), a gentile, but his father forbade the marriage, going so far as to publish a notice to that effect. In 1873 Solomon left for (perhaps sent by his father) the Northern Territory, where he became editor of the Northern Territory Times as well as holding successful mining and mercantile holdings. He helped run his brother Moss's Darwin store, then left to open his own, "Solomon's Emporium", which flourished while his brother's languished. He became an auctioneer in 1877, and had a business partnership with Frederick Percy Stevens and Herbert Henry Adcock in 1878. On 6 December 1880, three months after his father's death, Solomon married Wigzell, who was by then Mary Ann Bridgland, a widow with a young son; she died a little over four years later, having in the meantime had a daughter by Vaiben. Her two children were taken to Adelaide to be cared for by relatives. He became a prominent figure in the Northern Territory, where he gained the nickname "Black Solomon" from the time when, on a dare, he painted himself black and walked naked (streaked?) through the streets of Palmerston (now known as Darwin). He had helped found Palmerston's first municipal council in 1874 and was later served as Chairman. He founded a building company and became quite prosperous, building for himself a residence on The Esplanade that was perhaps the grandest in the town. Solomon was elected with colleague J. Langdon Parsons to the South Australian House of Assembly in April 1890 as the inaugural members for the Electoral district of Northern Territory (then part of South Australia) on the back of a campaign advocating a White Australia policy and prohibition of secret societies. Financial difficulties led to his resignation in March 1891, but his constituents brought him back and re-elected him at the next elections.

In 1894 he published a timely guide to Western Australian goldfields, which was well received and went to a second edition, with a "large map in five colours, showing mines in the Murchison and Coolgardie districts, telegraphs, railways and roads to gold fields", laws relating to mining and latest statistics.

He served as government whip before becoming Leader of the Opposition in 1899, when he had the Charles Kingston government dissolve over Kingston's proposal to extend suffrage to all householders and their wives. Solomon then became Premier and Treasurer of South Australia for one week, 1 December to 8 December 1899, before further machinations led to new Opposition Leader Frederick Holder gaining the Premiership, and gaining for Vaiben the cognomen "Sudden Solomon".

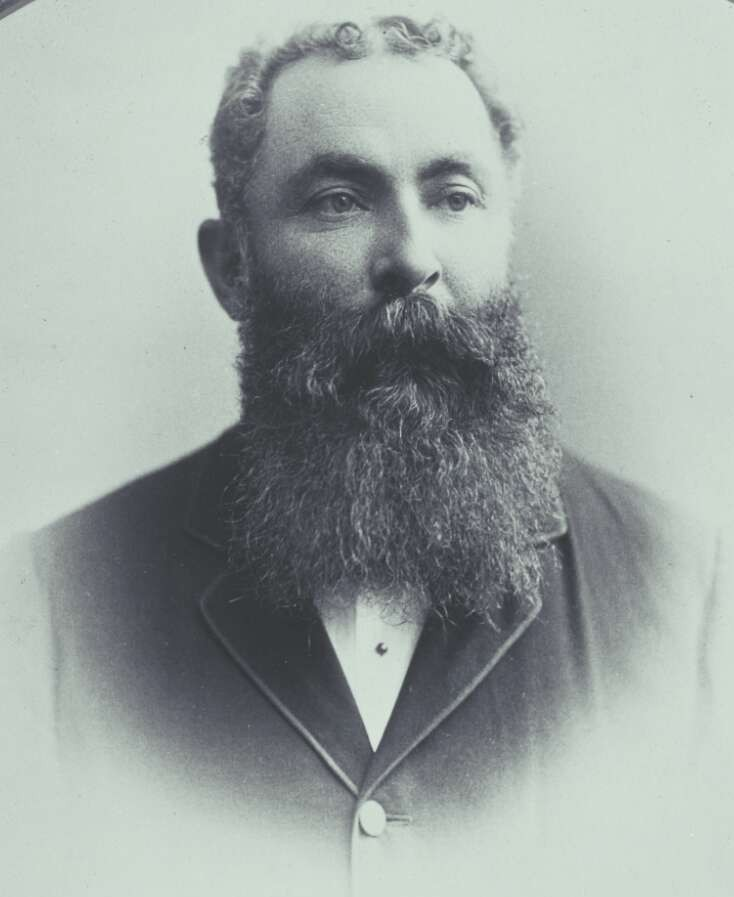
Vaiben Louis Solomon at the 1897–1898 Australasian Federal Convention.

Solomon was a member of the Australian Federation Convention in 1897 and the Convention that framed the Australian Constitution in 1897–98, before his election to the inaugural Australian federal Parliament in 1901 as a Free Trade member for the single statewide Division of South Australia. Solomon unsuccessfully stood for the Division of Boothby at the 1903 election before returning to the South Australian House of Assembly in 1905 as the Member for the Northern Territory. By the time of his death to cancer, Solomon was Deputy Leader of the Opposition. Solomon holds the dual distinctions of being South Australia's sole Jewish and shortest serving Premier.

== Recognition ==
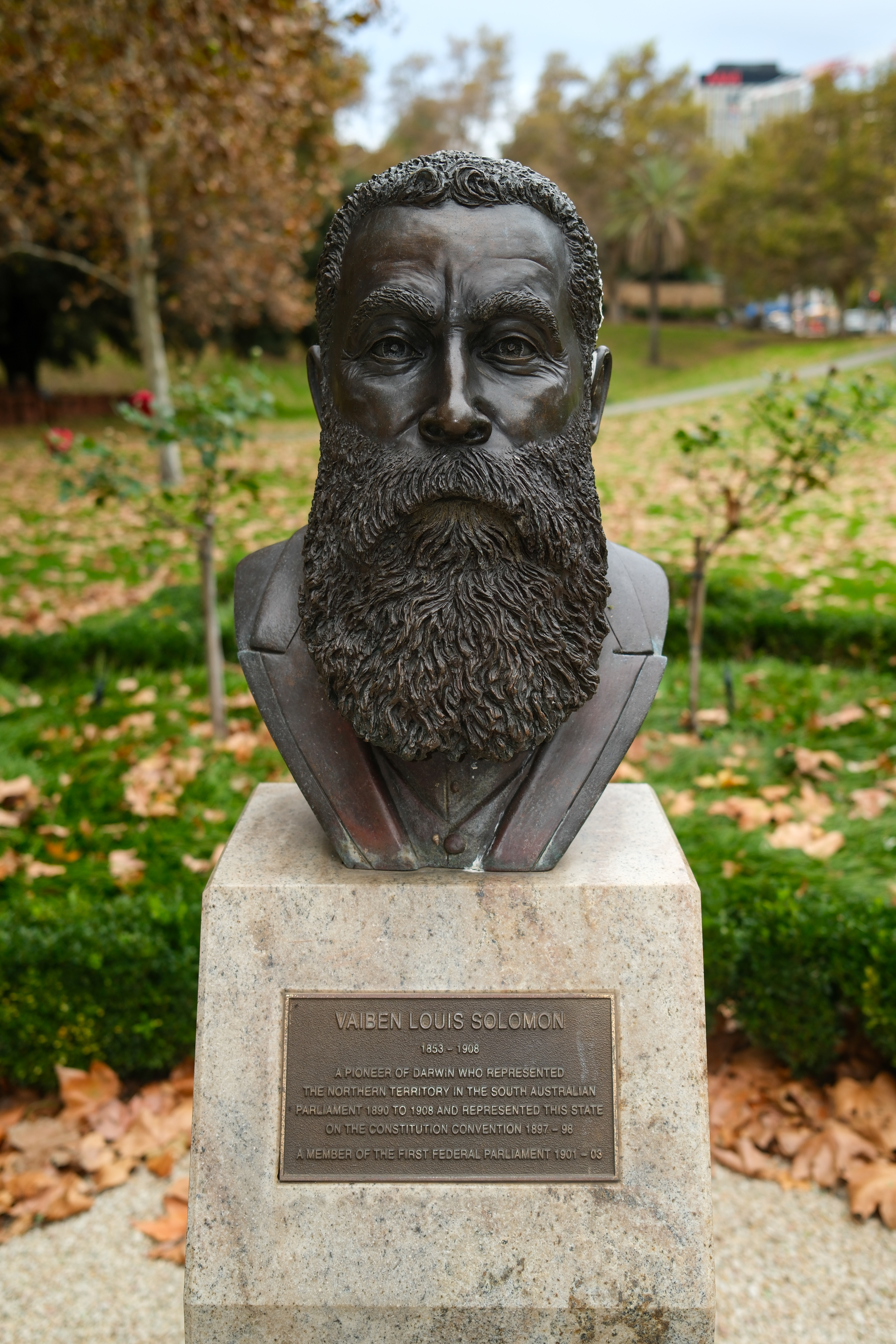
Bust of Solomon in Adelaide, 2026

The Hundred of Solomon in South Australia and the electoral Division of Solomon in the Northern Territory are named after him.

A bust of Solomon by sculptor Ken Martin stands in the Esther Lipman Gardens, a rose garden dedicated to his daughter, Lady Esther Lipman, who was the first female member of Adelaide City Council.

== Family ==
V. L. Solomon (1853–1908) married the widow Mary Ann Bridgland (née Wigzell) (c. June 1856 – 7 January 1885) on 6 December 1880 in Darwin. He married again, to Alice Cohen ( – 19 May 1954) of Richmond, Victoria on 22 July 1896, and lived at "Beryl", Robe Terrace Medindie. His children were:

- Mary Danks Solomon (10 September 1881 – 1 June 1952) born in Darwin, married financier D(avid) Leon Abraham ( – 24 April 1944) on 16 September 1903. She was awarded the Royal Humane Society's medal in 1894
- Vaiben Louis "Vaib" Solomon (31 May 1897 – ) married Claribelle "Claire" Mitchell ( – ) on 31 March 1931. He was educated at St. Peter's College then Wesley College, Melbourne. As "Vaiben Louis" he won some fame as a humorous writer, and was commissioned by Hugh J. Ward, who had the rights to the "hit" farce Tons of Money to write a musical version, which had a successful run at Melbourne's Princess Theatre. He was in business as an accountant.
- Esther Solomon MBE (6 April 1900 – 27 January 1991) married dentist Hyam John "Boy" Lipman (11 January 1889 – 16 March 1960) on 9 April 1919; she married a second time, to Harrold Cook. Her third marriage was to Roland Ellis Jacobs (28 February 1891 – 28 June 1981) on 30 November 1970. Esther was the first woman elected to the Adelaide City Council and served two terms as Deputy Mayor.
- Elizabeth Laura "Betty" Solomon (1908 – c. 2007) married Eric B. Fewster ( – ) c. 15 July 1930

He adopted Mary Ann's son Harrie Walter Bridgland (31 May 1879 – 17 October 1947), who for a time called himself Harrie Walter Solomon or Solomon-Bridgland, then disowned him in 1903. Harrie was a champion swimmer, as was his son Walter Lewis Bridgland (23 March 1908 – 30 July 1987), Lord Mayor of Adelaide 1966–1968.

For further details on Vaiben Louis Solomon's extended family, please refer to Samuel Moss Solomon.

== See also ==
- Solomon ministry
- List of Jewish members of the Australian parliament

== Notes ==
Political offices
Preceded by John Downer	Leader of the Opposition of South Australia; 1899	Succeeded by Frederick Holder
Preceded by Charles Kingston	Premier of South Australia; 1899	Succeeded by Frederick Holder
Preceded by Frederick Holder	Treasurer of South Australia; 1899	Succeeded by Frederick Holder
Preceded by Frederick Holder	Leader of the Opposition of South Australia; 1899–1901	Succeeded by Robert Homburg
Parliament of South Australia
New district	Member for Northern Territory; 1890–1901; Served alongside: Parsons, Griffiths, Herbert	Succeeded by Samuel James Mitchell
Preceded by Charles Edward Herbert	Member for Northern Territory; 1905–1908; Served alongside: Mitchell	Succeeded by Thomas Crush
Parliament of Australia
New district	Member for South Australia; 1901–1903; Served alongside: Batchelor, Bonython, Glynn, Holder, Kingston, Poynton	District abolished
