= Electoral district of Gladstone (South Australia) =

Former South Australian state electoral district

Coordinates: 33°16′09″S 138°21′15″E

Gladstone South Australia—House of Assembly
- State: South Australia
- Created: 1884
- Abolished: 1902
- Demographic: Rural

Gladstone is a defunct electoral district that elected members to the House of Assembly, the lower house of the bicameral legislature of the then colony of South Australia.

As of 1884, its extent included the following towns - Crystal Brook, Gladstone, Georgetown, Laura and Merriton.

== Members ==
Member	Party	Term	Member	Party	Term
Alfred Catt		1884–1902	James Howe		1884–1891
Alfred Catt		1884–1902	James Howe	Defence League	1891–1896
Alfred Catt		1884–1902	Ernest Roberts	Labor	1896–1902
