= Francis Bernard Keogh =

Australian politician

Francis Bernard Keogh (6 February 1861 – 9 July 1927) was an Australian politician who represented the South Australian House of Assembly multi-member seat of West Adelaide from 1901 to 1902.

The son of businessman Patrick Keogh, Keogh was born and raised in West Adelaide. He was educated at St. Francis Seminary, went to work for P. Falk & Co. manufacturing jewellers for seven years to 1883, and went to Melbourne for a period before returning to Adelaide. In 1886, he was appointed secretary of the South Australian Building Society. He was involved in a range of community organisations: he was one of the founders of St. Patrick's Literary Society in 1879, became honorary secretary of the Irish National Federation in 1895, and was elected South Australian president of the Hibernian Society in 1896. He was manager and editor of early Catholic publication the Catholic Monthly, served as vice-president of the West Adelaide Football Club and was a long-time contributor to The Southern Cross, serving as its acting editor in 1900.

Keogh first entered politics in December 1900, winning election to the Grey Ward of the Adelaide City Council by a large majority. On 1 June 1901, he was elected to the House of Assembly winning a by-election in West Adelaide caused by the resignation of Lee Batchelor upon his election to the first federal parliament. He ran for re-election at the 1902 state election, but was defeated. He was also defeated for his city council seat in December 1902 in a major and unpredicted upset.

In 1902, he became secretary of the South Australian branch of the Licensed Victuallers' Association, a position which he held until his death. Keogh died at the North Adelaide Private Hospital in July 1927. He was buried at the Roman Catholic Cemetery in West Terrace.
