= 1901 West Adelaide state by-election =

South Australian By-election

The 1901 West Adelaide state by-election was a by-election held on 1 June 1901 for the South Australian House of Assembly seat of West Adelaide.

== Results ==
The by-election was triggered by the election of West Adelaide MHA and former Labor leader Lee Batchelor to the inaugural Australian House of Representatives at the 1901 federal election. Although Labor candidate James Healey was favoured to succeed Batchelor, he was defeated by City of Adelaide councillor and Catholic community figure Francis Bernard Keogh.

West Adelaide state by-election, 1 June 1901
Party	Candidate	Votes	%	±%
	Francis Bernard Keogh	764	28.9	
Labor	James Healey	600	22.7	
	Alfred Myers	567	21.4	
	Robert Charles Bustard	318	12.0	
	George Hussey	235	8.9	
	Edward Alfred Henry Madge	97	3.7	
	John Sprod	24	0.9	
	John O'Connell	16	0.6	
	Joseph William Gilbert Alford	14	0.5	
	James Robert Scott	10	0.4	
Total formal votes		2,645	97.4	
Informal votes		70	2.6	
Turnout		2,715	38.4	
Independent gain from Labor		Swing	N/A	

== See also ==
- List of South Australian state by-elections
