= Alfred Catt =

Australian politician

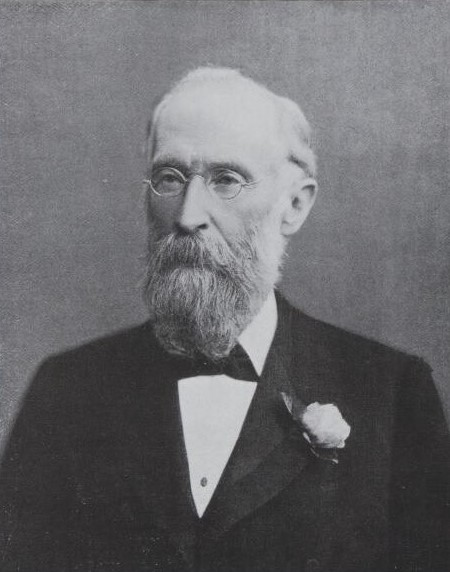

Alfred Catt (19 December 1833 – 28 October 1919) was a South Australian politician. He was a member of the South Australian House of Assembly from 1881 to 1902, representing the electorates of Stanley (1881–1884) and Gladstone (1884–1902). He was Commissioner for Public Works under John Cox Bray from 1881 to 1884 and again under Thomas Playford II from 1887 to 1889.

Catt was born in Newington, Kent, England, third child of Charles Catt, a carpenter, and his wife Sarah, née Knott. Catt arrived in South Australia in 1847, and for ten years engaged in agricultural pursuits at Balhannah and Strathalbyn. After a short trial of the Victorian diggings he returned to Strathalbyn, and entered into business. Subsequently he opened a store at the then youthful town of Gladstone, South Australia.

Catt was elected to the Assembly for the district of Stanley, 27 April 1881. Three years later, when the constituency was reconstructed, he was returned for Gladstone. Catt accepted the post of Commissioner of Crown Lands in John Bray's first administration, on 24 June 1881, and held it till 23 April 1884, under circumstances of special difficulty. Disasters had fallen thickly upon the farmers of the colony, especially in the northern districts lying beyond Goyder's Line of rainfall, where thirsty and often heavily timbered country had been taken up at extravagant prices by the competing agriculturists, who in some cases had offered as much as £6 6s. per acre. The attempt to grow wheat in these parts proved that the selectors could not pay the stipulated price, and the Government of the day came to the rescue with a proposal that the farmers should be allowed to surrender their land and compete for it again. The result was that they got their land back at about £1 0s. 6d., thus entailing upon the State a nominal loss of about half a million. The surrender clauses were admittedly difficult to administer, and Mr. Catt was much blamed at the time for allowing farmers holding excellent land in the lower north and south-east to come under these clauses. Catt, however, claimed that these were exceptional cases. On the fall of the John Downer Ministry in 1887, Catt accepted the portfolio of Commissioner of Public Works under Thomas Playford II, and held it from 11 June 1887, to 27 June 1889. At the commencement of the session of 1890 Catt was unanimously elected to the Chairmanship of Committees of the Legislative Assembly. In 1887 he received the royal permission to bear the title of "Honourable" within the colony.

Catt died in St Peters, Adelaide, South Australia, on 28 October 1919.

Political offices
Preceded by Luke Furner	Commissioner of Public Works; 1887–1889	Succeeded by James Howe
South Australian House of Assembly
Preceded by George Strickland Kingston; Charles Mann	Member for Stanley; 1881–1884; Served alongside: James Howe	Succeeded by Edward William Hawker; John Miller
New creation	Member for Gladstone; 1884–1902; Served alongside: James Howe, Ernest Roberts	Seat abolished
