= Electoral district of Northern Territory =

Former South Australian state electoral district

Northern Territory South Australia—House of Assembly
- State: South Australia
- Created: 1890
- Abolished: 1911
- Namesake: Northern Territory
- Demographic: Rural
- Coordinates: 20°S 133°E

The Electoral district of Northern Territory was an electoral district of the South Australian House of Assembly from 1890 to 1911. The electorate encompassed all of what is the Northern Territory when the Territory was included as part of South Australia for political purposes.

The district returned two members at each election and supported independent members for much of its existence.

The most prominent member for the electorate was Vaiben Louis Solomon, the twenty-first Premier of South Australia.

== Members ==
Member	Party	Term	Member	Party	Term
Vaiben Louis Solomon		1890–1901	J. L. Parsons		1890–1893
Vaiben Louis Solomon		1890–1901	Walter Griffiths		1893–1900
Vaiben Louis Solomon		1890–1901	C. E. Herbert	National League	1900–1905
S. J. Mitchell		1901–1906	C. E. Herbert	National League	1900–1905
S. J. Mitchell		1901–1906	Vaiben Louis Solomon		1905–1905
S. J. Mitchell	Liberal and Democratic	1906–1910	Vaiben Louis Solomon	National League	1906–1908
S. J. Mitchell	Liberal and Democratic	1906–1910	Thomas Crush	Labor	1908–1911
J. A. V. Brown	Farmers and Producers	1910–1910	Thomas Crush	Labor	1908–1911
J. A. V. Brown	Liberal Union	1910–1911	Thomas Crush	Labor	1908–1911

== See also ==
- Division of Northern Territory, a division of the Australian House of Representatives from 1922 to 2001.
- Parliament of the Northern Territory, created in 1948.
