= Charles Edward Herbert =

Australian politician

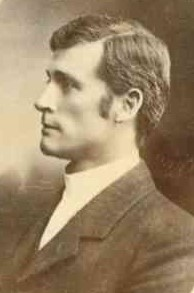

Member of the South Australian House of Assembly for Northern Territory Elections: 1900, 1902
- In office 20 October 1900 – 27 May 1905

Government Resident of the Northern Territory
- In office 1 February 1905 – 8 February 1910
- Preceded by: C. J. Dashwood

Deputy Chief Judicial Officer for the Territory of Papua
- In office 1910–1928

Acting Judge of the Northern Territory
- In office May 1921 – October 1921

Administrator of Norfolk Island
- In office 6 June 1928 – 21 January 1929

Personal details
- Born: 12 June 1860 Strathalbyn, South Australia
- Died: 21 January 1929 (aged 68) Norfolk Island
- Party: Conservatives

Charles Edward Herbert (12 June 1860 – 21 January 1929) was an Australian politician and judge. He was a member of the South Australian House of Assembly from 1900 to 1905, representing the electorate of Northern Territory. He was Government Resident of the Northern Territory from 1905 to 1910. He was then deputy chief judicial officer of the Territory of Papua (later Judge of the Central Court of Papua) from 1910 to 1928. This role saw him serve for extended periods on the Executive Council of Papua, and act as its Administrator and Lieutenant-Governor. During this period, he served as an acting judge of the Supreme Court of the Northern Territory in 1921. He was appointed Administrator of Norfolk Island in 1928, holding the position until his death in 1929.

Government offices
| Preceded by Charles Dashwood | Government Resident of the Northern Territory; 1905-1910 | Succeeded by Samuel James Mitchell |
