= Andrew Dods Handyside =

Australian politician

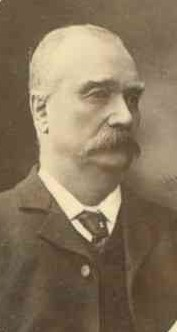

Andrew Dods Handyside (1835 – 23 May 1904) was a politician in colonial South Australia (a state of Australia from 1901), a member of the South Australian House of Assembly.

Handyside was born in East Lothian, Scotland. He emigrated to Victoria (Australia) in 1853, and was engaged in pastoral pursuits in that colony and New South Wales until 1868, when he settled in South Australia.

Handyside was elected to the seat of Albert in the South Australian House of Assembly on 5 January 1885, a position he held until the seat was abolished on 2 May 1902. Handyside was then elected to the seat of Victoria and Albert on 3 May 1902, holding that seat until his death on 23 May 1904. From 21 June 1892 to 15 October 1892, Handyside was Commissioner of Public Works.

Handyside died at Narracoorte, South Australia on 23 May 1904, survived by one son and three daughters.

== See also ==
- Hundred of Handyside

Political offices
Preceded by John Jenkins	Commissioner of Public Works; 1892	Succeeded by Lawrence Grayson
Preceded by John Jenkins	Commissioner of Public Works; 1899	Succeeded by Richard Foster
