= List of South Australian royal commissions =

This is a list of royal commissions and commissions of inquiry appointed by the Government of South Australia. Royal Commissions are currently held in South Australia under the terms of the Royal Commissions Act 1917.

This list includes Royal Commissions that were conducted jointly with the Government of Australia. It does not include Select Committees.

Year(s)	Royal Commission or Commission	Commissioners
Province of South Australia
1859	Royal Commission appointed by the Governor-in-Chief to inquire into the loss of the SS Admella	Captain Bloomfield Douglas (Chairman); William Scott; Richard Tapley; Handasyde Duncan; Henry Strangways
1861	Royal commission on real property law	Charles Cooper (Chairman); Richard Hanson; George Waterhouse; Robert Torrens; John Henry Barrow
1864	Royal Commission on the Customs House	John Hart: Charles Henry Goode; John Formby; George Young
1864	Royal Commission appointed to inquire into and report on the management, etc. of the Lunatic Asylum and Hospital	William Wyatt (Chairman): George Mayo; Thomas Elder; Neville Blyth; A. Sidney Clark
1865	Royal Commission appointed by the Governor-in-Chief to report on colonial defences	John Hart (Chairman); Henry Strangways; Peter Egerton-Warburton; James Hesketh Biggs; George Frederick Dashwood
1865	Royal Commission appointed by the Governor-in-Chief to inquire into the state of the northern runs	Charles Bonney; Wentworth Cavenagh; C.J. Valentine
1865–1866	Royal Commission on the Port Harbour	John Hart (Chairman); Henry Strangways; Peter Egerton-Warburton; James Hesketh Biggs; George Frederick Dashwood
1866	Royal Commission appointed by the Governor-in-Chief to inquire into the working of the Lands Titles Registration Office	John T. Bagot (Chairman); William Kay; W.M. Letchford
1866	Royal Commission appointed by the Governor-in-Chief to inquire into the management of the Northern Territory expedition	W.L. O'Halloran (Chairman); C.H. Goode; H.E. Bright
1866	Commission of Inquiry into management of Police Force	
1867	Royal Commission appointed by the Governor-in-Chief to inquire into the state of runs suffering from drought	John T. Bagot (Chairman); John Hodgkis; William Townsend; Neville Blyth; Henry E. Bright
1867	Royal Commission appointed by the Governor-in-Chief to inquire charges against Waterworks Engineer	T. Reynolds (Chairman); William Milne; John Colton; David Bower; John Carr; Henry E. Bright; Philip Santo
1867–1868	Royal Commission appointed by the Governor-in-Chief to inquire and report upon the diseases in cereals	John H. Barrow (Chairman); Thomas Hogarth; William Everard; W. Cavenagh
1869	Royal Commission to inquire into and report upon the public accounts	
1872–1873	Royal Commission appointed to inquire into the Intestacy, Real Property, and Testamentary Causes Acts	Rupert Ingleby (Chairman); W.C. Belt; Leonard W. Thrupp; William Brind; F.E. Krichauff
1873	Commission of Inquiry appointed to inquire into matters in dispute in connection with the Hope Valley aqueduct contract	Philip Santo (Chairman); William Rogers; James Pearce; John Crozier; Robert Cottrell
1873–1874	Royal Commission appointed to consider the whole matter of remuneration and classification of the Civil Service	E.W. Hitchin (Chairman); J. Boothby; Frederick J. Sanderson; James N. Blackmore; Samuel Deering; W.T. Sheppard
1873–1874	Royal Commission appointed to inquire into the whole question of the new Institute and Museum	Richard Hanson (Chairman); William Everard; William Milne; William Gosse; Rowland Rees
1874	Royal Commission appointed to inquire into the alcoholic strength of South Australian wines	William Milne; John William Lewis; Richard Schomburgk; Samuel Davenport; Robert Dalrymple Ross
1874	Royal Commission appointed to inquire into and report upon the plans submitted in competition for the new Parliament houses and the new Institute and Museum, and the sites best suited for their erection	H.E. Bright (Chairman); William Milne; G.S. Kingston; J. Fisher; James Pearce; George C. Hawker; G.T. Light; W.D. Allott
1874	Royal Commission appointed to inquire into the organisation and working of the Post Office Department	William R. Boothby (Chairman); Frederick J. Sanderson; William G. Cuthbertson; William Longbottom; Caleb Peacock; H.E. Bright
1874–1875	Royal Commission appointed to inquire into the subject of railway construction	G.W. Goyder (Chairman); W. Barber; Samuel Davenport; Alfred Hallett; William R. Boothby; H.C. Mais; W.L. Beare
1875	Royal Commission appointed to inquire into the best means of providing agricultural and technical education	Henry Ayers (Chairman); Ebenezer Ward; John Ingleby; Samuel Davenport; R. Schomburgk
1875–1876	Royal Commission appointed to inquire into the whole question of sanitation for the Province	R. Rees MP (Chairman); J. Crozier MLC; P. Santo MLC; T. Johnson MP; W. Kay MP; J. Richards MP; R.R. Ross MP; B. Taylor MP; W. Gosse; A. Campbell; J. Sinclair
1876	Royal Commission appointed to consider and report upon the whole question of the defences of the Province	Colonel Warburton: Frederick Howard; Boyle Travers Finniss; William Barber; Benjamin D'Urban Musgrave; James Hesketh Briggs
1877–1878	Royal Commission appointed to report on the principles and working of tribunals of commerce, etc., etc.	Samuel Way (Chairman); Neville Blyth; Philip Santo; Henry Scott; Rupert Ingleby; Samuel Tomkinson
1878	Royal Commission appointed to report on the Parliament buildings site	Henry Scott (Chairman); William Milne; Alexander Hay; Philip Santo; G.S. Kingston; John Darling; William Townsend
1879	Royal Commission appointed to report on the liquor laws	Samuel Tomkinson (Chairman); Joseph Fisher; Henry Scott; John Carr; Hugh Fraser; W.J. Magarey; David Nock
1879–1882	Royal Commission appointed to report on public finance	Ebenezer Cooke (Chairman): J.C. Bray; William B. Rounsevell; David Murray; S. Tomkinson; W.J. Magarey; R.D. Ross; H.E. Bright
1879	Royal Commission appointed to inquire into the Parliament buildings site	G.S. Kingston (Chairman); Allan Campbell; Henry Scott; William Sandover; W. Townsend; E.T. Smith; W.C. Buik; L. Scammell
1879–1882	Royal Commission appointed to report on the public works	R.D. Ross (Chairman): George C. Hawker; Lavingdon Glyde; David Bower; Hugh Fraser; Luke L. Furner; Caleb Peacock
1879	Royal Commission on sewage farm site	T. Hinginbotham (Chairman); R. Schomburgk; R. Tate; G. Chamier; L. Scammell
1880–1881	Royal Commission appointed to report on wharves and jetties	W.H. Bean (Chairman): J.G. Ramsay; Henry Scott; Ebenezer Ward; R.H. Ferguson; H.C.E. Muecke; William Kay
1881	Royal Commission appointed to report on the alleged injuries by sparrows	Samuel Davenport (Chairman): John F. Pascoe; John Robertson; George F. Ind; George L. Barnard; William Rhodes; Thomas Atkinson
1881–1882	Royal Commission on the working of the Education Acts	J. Langdon Parsons (Chairman): John W. Downer; John Colton; Samuel Tomkinson; Robert Dixon; F. Basedow; Ebenezer Cooke; Jenkin Coles
1882	Royal Commission appointed to report on electoral districts	J.W. Downer (Chairman): J. Colton; W. Gilbert; W.R. Mortlock; J.H. Howe; H.E. Downer; W.B. Roundsevell; L.L. Furner
1883–1885	Royal Commission appointed to report on the Destitute Act, 1881	Samuel James Way (Chairman): M. Salom; W. Haines; C.H. Goode; Dr O'Connell; H.W. Thompson
1883–1884	Royal Commission appointed to report upon the Adelaide and Parkside Lunatic Asylums	John Colton (Chairman): Allan Campbell; J.H. Bagster; Thomas Johnson; Jenkin Coles; Arthur John Baker; Samuel D. Glyde
1883–1884	Royal Commission on railways	W.E. Matttinson (Chairman): T. Playford; Thomas Burgoyne; J.J. Duncan; J.H. Howe; H.E. Bright
1886–1887	Royal Commission on Government Stores	Samuel D. Glyde (Chairman): Luke L. Furner; David Bower; John Darling Jr; James Duncan; William Gilbert; Arthur Lucas Harrold; James Martin; Alfred W. Meeks
1887	Royal Commission on Transcontinental railway	S. Newland (Chairman): R.C. Baker; Allan Campbell; Thomas Burgoyne; F. Basedow; David Murray; John A. Cockburn
1887	Royal Commission on the utilisation of River Murray waters	
1888	Royal Commission on the land laws of South Australia	Clement Giles (Chairman); F.E.H.W. Krichauff; F.W. Holder; John Moule; Jenkin Coles; Thomas Burgoyne; William Copley
1888–1891	Civil Service Commission	Samuel D. Glyde (Chairman); H.E. Bright; D. Bews; William Longbottom; David Bower; Lawrence Grayson; J. Langdon Parsons; John Moule
1888–1889	Royal Commission appointed to consider the desirability of establishing a State Bank and Royal Mint	Robert Caldwell (Chairman): S. Solomon; William Copley; F. Krichauff; J.W. Castine; P.McM. Glynn; T. Playford; Samuel Tomkinson; Henry Scott
1889	Barossa water commission	Alfred Catt (Chairman): Alexander Hay; R. Homburg; A. McDonald; Lawrence Grayson; J.V. O'Loghlin; J.H. Bagster; John Warren
1889–1890	Royal Commission on an Angaston railway	J.H. Howe: A.R. Addison; J. Martin; J. Downer; R. Caldwell; W. Gilbert; C.H. Hussey
1889–1890	Mining Commission	J.H. Gordon (Chairman): Allan Campbell; A.D. Handyside; J.C.F. Johnson; John Moule; Henry Allerdale Grainger
1890	Royal Commission on the utilisation of River Murray waters	J.H. Howe: P.McM. Glynn; F. Krichauff; A.H. Landseer; Alfred Catt; T. Playford; James Rankine; C.J.F. Johnson; James W. Jones; A.D. Handyside; Thomas Burgoyne; C.H. Hussey; Allan Campbell; James Martin; J.C. Bray; G.W. Goyder
1890	Queensland border railway commission	D. Bews (Chairman): Charles Kimber; J.V. O'Loughlin; J.G. Jenkins; Luke L. Furner; Thomas Burgoyne; Allan Campbell
1890	Royal Commission on the Water Conservation Department	W.A. Horn; T. Playford; Alfred Catt; Lawrence Grayson; J.H. Howe; P.McM. Glynn; J. Lancelot Stirling
1890	Royal Commission on intercolonial free trade	F.W. Holder (Chairman): David Murray; John Darling; William Gilbert; J. Hancock; B. Gould; J.G. Jenkins; John Moule; Henry Allerdale Grainger; Theodore Hack; A. McDonald
1890–1891	Royal Commission on landing and embarking European mails	T. Playford: A.R. Addison; Allan Campbell; J.W. Castine; Lawrence Grayson; F.W. Holder; J.W. White
1890–1891	Royal Commission on the Port Augusta and Cockburn railway	J. Hancock (Chairman): Alfred Catt; B. Gould; Laurence O'Loughlin; John Miller; Ebenezer Ward; John J. Osman
1891	Queensland border railway commission	J. Hancock (Chairman): Thomas Burgoyne; Peter P. Gillen; Allan Campbell; A. McDonald; J. Langdon Parsons; J.W. White; J.G. Jenkins
1891	Royal Commission on the question of the best route for the Blyth railway extension	John Miller (Chairman): A.R. Addison; J.V. O'Loghlin; Ebenezer Ward; William B. Rounsevell; Thomas H. Brooker; A. McDonald; William Gilbert
1891	Pastoral lands commission	Robert Caldwell (Chairman): John Warren; F.W. Holder; J.R. Kelly; William Copley; Robert Kelly
1891–1892	Royal Commission on the valuations of pastoral improvements	James Cock: Thomas Burgoyne; James Hague; John Miller; Robert Caldwell; J. Lancelot Stirling; William Copley
1892	Royal Commission on the south-east drainage system	A.D. Handyside (Chairman): W. Copley; R. Caldwell; John J. Osman; A.A. Kirkpatrick; H. Bartlett; William Haslam; Peter P. Gillen; Laurence O'Loughlin
1892	Orroroo and Port Germein railway commission	L. Grayson (Chairman): J. Warren; H. Lamshed; R. Kelly; F.W. Holder
1892	Royal Commission appointed to inquire into the question of the expediency of constructing a graving dock in South Australia at the public expense	G. Feltham Hopkins (Chairman): Thomas Burgoyne; A.R. Addison; John Darling; J.W. Castine; A. McDonald; J.G. Jenkins
1892	Shops and factories commission	C.C. Kingston (Chairman): J.A. Cockburn; G. Ash; Thomas H. Brooker; R.S. Guthrie; J. Hague; J.A. McPherson
1892	Royal Commission on main roads	A.D. Handyside (Chairman): G.W. Cotton; J.V. O'Loghlin; B. Gould; T. Hack; R. Kelly; J.R. Kelly; G.H. Lake; H. Lamshed
1893	Royal Commission on stores	T. Playford (Chairman): Thomas H. Brooker; J.W. Castine; D. Morley Charleston; William Gilbert; Theodore Hack; William Haslam; F.W. Holder
1893	Vermin-proof fencing commission	F.W. Holder (Chairman): J.H. Howe; A.A. Kirkpatrick; Ebenezer Ward; T. Playford; John Moule; John J. Osman; J.W. White
1894	Royal Commission on the utilisation of River Murray waters	Alfred Catt (Chairman): E.W. Hawker; James Rankine; G.W. Goyder; P.McM. Glynn; A.D. Handyside; Thomas Burgoyne; A.H. Landseer; T. Playford; J.C.F. Johnson; F. Krichauff; Allan Campbell; J.H. Howe; James W. Jones
1895	Royal Commission on the Northern Territory	William Haslam (Chairman); Frederick Holder; James O'Loghlin; John Warren; William Archibald; William Gilbert; Vaiben Louis Solomon
1895	Royal Commission on the Adelaide Hospital	F.W. Holder: A.R. Addison; Thomas H. Brooker; R.S. Guthrie; R. Homburg; Alex S. Paterson; Catherine Helen Spence
1896	Royal Commission on the Beetaloo waterworks	H. Allerdale Grainger: J.G. Jenkins; A.R. Addison; John G. Brice; G. McGregor; John Warren; Thomas H. Brooker; Charles R. Goode; J.A. McPherson
1896–1897	Royal Commission on the Government wharves	Ebenezer Ward (Chairman): J.V. O'Loughlin; R.S. Guthrie; J. Lancelot Stirling; William Russell; A. McDonald; J.W. Shannon
1897	Royal Commission on the Bundaleer waterworks	R.W. Foster (Chairman): John Miller; A. McDonald; I. MacGillivray; J.G. Jenkins; Ernest A. Roberts; William Russell; W.A. Robinson; Charles Willcox
1897–1898	Pastoral lands commission	Laurence O'Loughlin (Chairman): John G. Brice; Thomas Burgoyne; J. Lancelot Stirling; E.L. Batchelor; J.H. Howe; W. Copley; Alex Poynton; Andrew Tennant; A.G. Downer
1897–1898	Royal Commission on the aged poor	William H. Carpenter (Chairman): Richard Butler; H. Adams; P.McM. Glynn; J.H. Howe; William Gilbert
1898–1899	South-eastern drainage commission	A.H. Peake: J. Lewis; John G. Brice; G. McGregor; J.T. Morris; A. McDonald; R.W. Foseter; R. Hooper
1899–1901	Public service commission	J.V. O'Loghlin (Chairman): W.A. Robinson; Alfred Catt; T. Burgoyne; William Copley; James Hutchinson; J.G. Jenkins
1899–1900	Royal Commission on Renmark and Murray River settlements	F.W. Holder (Chairman): H. Adams; S. Tomkinson; T. Playford; F.W. Coneybeer; C.M.R. Dumas; J.W. Shannon; J.W. Castine
1900	Royal Commission on main roads	T. Playford (Chairman); L. O'Loughlin; W.O. Archibald; W. Copley; D. McKenzie; W.H. Carpenter
1900	Royal Commission on the Taxation Acts	William Russell (Chairman): Charles Tucker; C.M.R. Dumas; John Warren; A. McDonald; F.W. Holder; F.J. Hourigan
State of South Australia
1901	Royal Commission on the Wine and Produce Depot	J.W. Castine (Chairman): W.O. Archibald; Richard Butler; A. McDonald; E.L. Batchelor; John Miller; William Copley
1902	Wine and Produce Commission in London	Henry Allerdale Grainger (Chairman); David Murray; John H. Cockburn
1902	Royal Commission on the question of the construction of a railway to Pinnaroo	John Lewis MLC (Chairman): Andrew Dods Handyside MP; John Miller MP; Robert Homburg MP; Richard Witty Foster MP; George Riddoch MLC; Richard Wood MP; Thomas Pascoe MLC; Andrew Alexander Kirkpatrick MLC; John George Bice MLC
1902	Interstate Royal Commission on the River Murray representing the States of New South Wales, Victoria, and South Australia	Joseph Davis (President): Stuart Murray; Frederick N. Burchell
1903	Royal Commission on waterworks	John Warren (Chairman): R.W. Foster; John G. Brice; Thomas Pascoe; Henry W. Thompson; W.P. Cummins; A.D. Handyside
1903–1904	Royal commission on railways	R.W. Foster (Chairman); A. von Doussa; John G. Bice; E.H. Coombe; F.W. Coneybeer; Thomas H. Brooker; F.W. Peach; Andrew S. Neill
1905–1906	Royal Commission on the necessity for improved facilities for the trade of the south-east	William Senior (Chairman); A.H. Peake; John G. Brice; A. von Doussa; W.O. Archibald; T. Burgoyne; Alfred Catt; A. McDonald; F.J.T. Pflaum
1906	Royal Commission upon the question of the treatment of inebriates	Thomas H. Smeaton (Chairman): J.M. Holder; Elizabeth W. Nicholls; T. Pascoe; Theodore Bruce; W.J.P. Giddings; Thomas Leahy
1907	Royal Commission upon the charges against produce merchants	Laurence O'Loughlin (Chairman): P. Allen; W. Jamieson; Ernest A. Roberts; John Travers
1907–1908	Royal Commission on main roads	Laurence O'Loughlin (Chairman): John G. Brice; A. von Doussa; W.O. Archibald; W.J. Blacker; T. Burgoyne; W. Miller; William Senior
1908–1909	Royal Commission on the question of the marketing of wheat	E.H. Coombe (Chairman): Richard Butler; A. McDonald; Laurence O'Loughlin; John Newland; Ernest Roberts; Crawford Vaughan; C. Goode
1908–1909	Royal Commission on the Land Titles Office and General Registry of Deeds Office	R. Homburg (Chairman); J.G. Russel; W. Strawbridge; J. Gordon
1908–1909	Royal Commission on the conviction of Myles Flynn	John W. Downer (Chairman); Eustace B. Grundy; G.J.R. Murray
1909–1912	Royal Commission on Eyre's Peninsula railways	Laurence O'Loughlin (Chairman); A. von Doussa; T. Pascoe; P. Allen; C.H. Goode; H. Chesson; J. Miller
1909	Royal Commission upon the necessity of a railway to Willunga	A.H. Peake (Chairman); J.H. Howe; A.R. Addison; Harry Jackson; David James; F.J.T. Pflaum; John Verran
1909–1912	Royal commission on the Murray lands railway	Laurence O'Loughlin (Chairman): H. Chesson; A. von Doussa; T. Pascoe; J. Miller; C.H. Goode; P. Allen
1909–1911	Royal Commission upon the necessity for a railway through Kangaroo Island	A.H. Peake (Chairman); J.H. Howe; A.R. Addison; Harry Jackson; David James; F.J.T. Pflaum; John Verran
1909	Royal Commission on the management of the Parkside Lunatic Asylum and treatment of criminal lunatics	James Gordon (Chairman); W. Ramsey Smith; R.H. Edmunds
1909–1910	Royal Commission on the suggested railway deviation at Goolwa	Laurence O'Loughlin (Chairman): P. Allen; A. von Doussa; H. Chesson; T. Pascoe; J. Miller; C.H. Goode
1910–1912	Royal Commission on northern railways	E.H. Coombe (Chairman): Lucas MLC; Anstey MP; Jamieson MP; Blacker MP; Blundell MP; Ritchie MP; Pflaum MP
1910–1911	Royal Commission on the proposed railway from Eudunda to Robertstown	Laurence O'Loughlin (Chairman): J.H. Howe; John Lewis; Peter Allen; Thomas Burgoyne; F.W. Coneybeer; George Dankel; K.W. Duncan; J. Travers
1910–1912	Royal Commission on narrow-gauge extension and break of gauge	John Verran: Theodore Bruce, Alfred von Doussa; Edward Anstey; Percy Heggaton; William Jamieson
1910–1914	Royal Commission on the Sedan railway	Laurence O'Loughlin (Chairman): P. Allen; F.W. Coneybeer; G. Dankel; T. Burgoyne; J. Travers; K.W. Duncan
1910–1912	Royal Commission on water supply	David James (Chairman): John G. Brice; John Warren; J. Newland; L. O'Loughlin; T.H. Smeaton
1910–1912	Interstate Royal Commission on border railways	John George Bice (Chairman): A.H. Peake; T. Burgoyne; W. Miller; G. Ritchie; J.H. Howe
1911–1913	Royal Commission on the Adelaide University and higher education	T. Ryan MP (Chairman); Coneybeer MP; Cowan MLC; Styles MLC; Green MP
1911	Royal Commission on wharves and water frontages	John George Bice (Chairman): James G. Moseley; J. Verran; E. Klauer; W.J.C. Cole; I. MacGilliway; B.A. Moulden
1911–1912	Royal Commission on the shortage of labour in the clothing and boot trades	H. Coombe MP: F. Condon; W.W. Forwood; J. Gunn; E. Henretty; A. Hill; E. Vardon; A. Wallace; H. Winterbottom
1912	Royal Commission on electoral registration	William Isbister (Chairman) Walter Dalton Harry Gell
1913–1916	Royal Commission on the Aborigines	William Angus (Chairman): James Jelley MLC; John Lewis MLC; George Ritchie MP; John Verran
1914–1915	Royal Commission on the metropolitan abattoirs	J.G. Moseley MP (Chairman): J. Cowan MLC; F.S. Wallis MLC; E.A. Anstey MP; R.P. Blundell MP; H.S. Hudd MP; O.H. Duhst MP
1913–1915	Royal Commission on main roads	Frederick William Young (Chairman): W. Hannaford MLC; W.J.C. Cole MP; W. Miller MP; J. Travers MP; J. Jelly MLC; G. Bodey MP; Frederick Coneybeer
1913–1917	Royal Commission on the municipalisation of gas and electric services	Herbert Angas Parsons (Chairman): E. Lucas MLC; J.H. Vaughan; C. Vaughan; Robert Homburg
1915–1916	Royal Commission on electoral matters	John Albert Southwood (Chairman),ΩΩΩ Messrs E Klauer, E Lucas, A McDonald, P Rielly
1916–1918	Royal Commission on water supply	John Frederick Herbert (Chairman), Messrs D James, I MacGillvary, JG Bice, FS Wallis, P Allen, T Butterfield
1916–1919	Royal Commission on North Terrace reserves and railway centres	Thomas Hyland Smeaton (Chairman), Messrs J Carr, JH Cooke, T Green, J Gunn, GR Laffer, RA O'Connor
1916	Royal Commission on Port Adelaide road contracts	Thomas Colbatch, Peter Whitington
1917–1918	Royal Commission on government land purchases	Noel Webb (Deputy President of the Industrial Court of South Australia)
1917–1918	Royal Commission on Hannaford's quarry	W.L. Stuart (Master of the Supreme Court)
1917–1921	Royal Commission on the wheat scheme and rural industries	William Angus (Chairman)
1918	Royal Commission on the acquisition and disposal of wheat and material in connection with the South Australian wheat scheme	Noel Webb
1918–1920	Second Royal Commission on the acquisition and disposal of wheat and material in connection with the South Australian wheat scheme	Noel Webb
1919	Royal Commission on the Yatala Mental Hospital site	Walter Hannaford (Chairman), Alfred Blackwell, John Albert Southwood
1919–1920	Royal Commission on Loxton	Thomas Hewitson
1919–1920	Royal Commission on the Port Adelaide coal wharf	Henry Crosby (Chairman), Messrs JG Bice, T Pascoe, HR Buxton, VG Petherick, RS Richards, JA Southwood
1921–1922	Royal Commission on the Public Service of South Australia	Peter Whitington: Thomas Gill
1923–1927	Royal Commission on law reform	FW Birrell MP (Chairman), J Carr MLC, H Tassie MLC, T Butterfield MP, P Reidy MP, AW Robinson MP, HD Young MP
1923–1925	Royal Commission on south-eastern drainage	George Kermode, Walter Colebatch, Daniel Findlater
1923–1925	Irrigation Royal Commission under section 22 of Irrigation Act, 1922	Edgar Field, Richard Horsfield, Howard Jolley
1923–1925	Royal Commission on Eyre Peninsula transport charges and facilities	J Carr MLC, H Tassie MLC, Herbert Hudd MP, Stanley Whitford MP, Henry Crosby MP
1925	Royal Commission on plumbism	Keith R. Moore: J. L. Pearson; Herbert W. Gepp; W. Robinette
1925–1926	Royal Commission on rural settlement	Walter Colebatch (Chairman), Walter Spafford, John Fraser
1925	Royal Commission on Port Pirie Police	John Halcombe
1925	Royal Commission on the thousand homes contract	Samuel James Mitchell (Commissioner of Insolvency)
1925	Second Royal Commission on Port Pirie Police	Reginald Nesbit (Chairman), Duncan Fraser, James Geddes
1926–1927	Royal Commission on manufacturing and secondary industries	FJ Condon MP (Chairman), T Gluyas MLC, W Morrow MLC, EC Vardon MP, E Anthoney MP, W Harvey MP, SR Whitford MP
1926–1928	Royal Commission on traffic control	AJ Blackwell (Chairman), T Gluyas, H Tassie, PF Heggaton, LA Hopkins, JAS McLauchlan, J Stanley Verran
1926	Royal Commission on release of prisoners	Sir Herbert Kingsley Paine (Judge in Insolvency)
1926–1927	Royal Commission on the pastoral industry	Theodore Ernest Day, Esquire, Surveyor-General Francis Walter Lundie, Esquire, J.P. John O'Connor, Esquire, M.P. John Edward Pick, Esquire, J.P. Arthur Graham Rymill, Esquire
1926–1927	Second Royal Commission on allegations of bribery against police officers	
1927	Royal Commission on electoral districts	
1928	Royal Commission on electoral districts	Theodore E. Day (Chairman), O.H. Stephens, C.L. Matthews
1932–1933	Royal Commission on betting	Walter Ray, Walter Hannaford, George Laffer, Jack Critchley, Arthur McArthur
1933	Royal Commission on dairy industry prices	WJ Dawkins (Chairman), Arthur J Perkins, JW Wainwright
1934–1935	Royal Commission on the fishing industry	Reginald Rudall, Herbet Hale, Ernest Sheridan
1935	Royal Commission on matters concerning the promotion and operations of certain companies in South Australia	Alexander Briskham (Registrar of Companies)
1936	Royal Commission on afforestation	FT Perry MP, VG Petherick MP, RC Mowbray MLC, EA Oates MLC, H Tasie MLC, J McInnes MP
1936	Royal Commission on lotteries	Harold Piper (Chairman), Horace Hogben MP, Collier Cudmore MLC, Frank Condon MLC, Frederick Beerworth MP
1936–1937	Inquiry commission by the South Australian Government into the system of management of libraries maintained or assisted by the State	Grenfell Price (Dean of the Faculty of Arts at the University of Adelaide)
1937–1938	Royal Commission on transport	Geoffrey Reed (Lecturer in law at the University of Adelaide), John Wainwright, William Fowler
1937–1938	Royal Commission on betting laws and practice	Harold Piper, Kenneth Sanderson, Sidney Powell
1945	Royal Commission on the Adelaide Electric Supply Company	Geoffrey Reed (Supreme Court Justice), Professor Arthur Lang Campbell, John William Wainwright
1947–1951	Royal Commission on state transport services	Herbert Paine (Local court judge and special magistrate), William Bishop, Edmund Daly, Albert Thompson, Kenneth Wills (replaced by) Samuel Fisk
1956–1957	Royal Commission on local government; Report on creation of an additional district council district in the Upper South-East and adjustment of existing district council districts together with maps	Lawrence Johnston (Stipendiary Magistrate)
1959	Royal Commission in regard to Rupert Max Stuart	Sir J. Mellis Napier (Chairman), Geoffrey Reed (Supreme Court Justice), Bruce Ross
1965–1966	Royal Commission into the grape growing industry	G. H. P. Jeffery (Chairman and Auditor General)
1966–1967	Royal Commission into the law relating to the sale, supply and consumption of intoxicating liquors and other matters	Keith Sangster (Her Majesty's Counsel)
1967	Royal Commission into State Transport Services	Joseph Nelligan QC, Thomas Shanahan, George Jeffery (Auditor General)
1967	Royal Commission into John Douglas Murrie, Headmaster of Larrakeyah Primary School	George Walters (Supreme Court Justice)
1971–1972	Royal Commission into September Moratorium Demonstrations	Charles Bright (Supreme Court Justice)
1973–1975	Royal Commission into Local Government Areas	Gerald Ward (Chairman), Donald Pitt, Keith Hockrdige
1974–1975	Royal Commission into Monarto land transactions	Gerald Ward
1974–1975	Royal Commission into suspension of a high school student	Gordan Combe (Ombudsman)
1975	Royal Commission into allegations made by prisoners at Yatala Labour Prison	Laurence Johnston (Judge)
1977	Royal Commission into Juvenile Courts Act and other associated matters	R. F. Mohr (Supreme Court Justice)
1977	Royal Commission into law relating to shop trading hours and ancillary matters	William Lean (Industrial Commissioner)
1978	Royal Commission into law relating to the sale by retail of petroleum products	William Lean (Industrial Commissioner)
1978	Royal Commission into dismissal of Harold Hubert Salisbury	Roma Mitchell
1979	Royal Commission into the non-medical use of drugs	Ronald Sackville (Chairman, Dean of UNSW Law Faculty), Earle Hackett, Richard Nies
1979	Royal Commission into the floodlighting of Football Park at West Lakes	Peter Allan (Judge of the Industrial Court)
1981–1982	Royal Commission on allegations in relation to prisons under the charge, care and direction of the Director of the Department of Correctional Services and certain related matters	Gresley Clarkson (Queen's Counsel)
1983–1984	Splatt Royal Commission	Judge Carl Shannon (former Supreme Court Judge in NSW)
1991–1993	Royal Commission into the State Bank of South Australia	Samuel Jacobs QC (replaced by) John Mansfield
1995	Hindmarsh Island Royal Commission	Former District Court Judge, Iris Stevens, former Supreme Court Justice
2004–2008	Commission of Inquiry into Children in State Care	Ted Mullighan (Supreme Court Justice)
2004–2008	Commission of Inquiry into Children on the APY Lands	Ted Mullighan (Supreme Court Justice)
2005	Kapunda Road Royal Commission	Greg James QC
2012–2013	Royal Commission – Report of Independent Education	Bruce Debelle (Supreme Court Justice)
2014–2016	Child Protection Systems Royal Commission	Margaret Nyland (former Supreme Court Justice)
2015–2016	Nuclear Fuel Cycle Royal Commission	Rear Admiral Kevin Scarce
2018–2019	Murray–Darling Basin Royal Commission	Bret Walker SC
2022–2023	Royal Commission into Early Childhood Education and Care	Julia Gillard
2024–2025	Royal Commission into Domestic, Family and Sexual Violence	Natasha Stott Despoja
2026–2027	Royal Commission into Artificial Intelligence	Iain Ross, Kate Pounder, and Christopher Manning.

== Other inquiries ==
Year(s)	Inquiry	Headed by
1865	Board of Inquiry on the late railway accident	
1866	Board of Inquiry appointed to investigate a charge of tampering with emigration certificates	
1869	Stockade inquiry board	
1870	Board appointed to inquire into the cause of deficiencies in certain bonded stores, and conduct of customs officers in connection therewith	
1872	Committee appointed to consider the Assembly chamber arrangement	
1872	Board of inquiry into the management of the Metropolitan Police Force	
1873	Assembly chamber committee	
1875	Committee of Inquiry appointed to inquire into the general management of the Adelaide Hospital by the paid officers of the institution	
1878	Committee on the Parliament buildings site	
1878	Committee of the Legislative Council on Parliament buildings site	
1879	Board of advice on outer harbor accommodation	
1879	Board appointed to inquire into the case of Police v. Plumridge	
1880	Board of Inquiry to investigate certain charges made against Mr. J. Boothby, Under Secretary	
1880	Board of Inquiry appointed to investigate charges laid against Mr. Josiah Boothby, C.M.G. Under Secretary and Government Statist under Civil Service Act, no 3 of 1874	
1881	Privilege committee on the re-election of David Murray, Esq.	
1883	Inquiry into accident on Nairne railway at Blackwood	
1884–1885	Thow inquiry board, appointed to inquire into certain charges against Mr. Wm. Thow, the Locomotive Engineer of the S.A. Railways;	
1885	Patterson inquiry board appointed to inquire into certain charges against Mr R. C. Patterson, Deputy Engineer-in-Chief of the S.A. Railways	
1886	Board of Inquiry into Islington railway accident	
1886	Board of Inquiry into cause of accident on Southern railway line on Easter Monday, 26 April 1886	
1886–1888	Board appointed by the Government to inquire into and report upon the best means of developing a general system of technical, including agricultural, education in the Province	
1888	(Public Service commission on) A.L. Thurpp's (sic) claim re wattle seed	
1888	Board appointed by the Chief Secretary to inquire into certain allegations in regard to the treatment in the Adelaide and Parkside Asylums of a pauper lunatic named George Willoughby	
1890	(Public Service commission on) A.L. Thurpp's (sic) claim re wattle seed	
1890	Board appointed by the Government to enquire into and report upon the best means of lighting by electricity the Houses of Parliament and other public buildings adjoining, and the estimated cost compared with the cost of the present system of lighting with gas	
1890	South Australian railway brakes board	
1892	Board appointed to inquire whether or not any public loss has been occasioned or permitted in connection with the pastoral valuations by the misconduct, negligence, incapacity, or error of Mr. S.G. Huebbe	
1892	Board appointed to inquire into the question of the establishment of a truant school	
1894	Committee appointed to confer with any committee of the L.C. on the necessity for better accommodation for the Council	
1898	Committee appointed by the LC on the title of "honourable" in reference to members of the LC	
1899–1900	Board appointed to inquire into charges against detective police	
1902–1903	Adelaide water supply inquiry board	
1903	Board of Inquiry re Dr. Ramsay Smith	
1911	Committee of Inquiry into alleged irregularities in connection with the Willunga railway polls	
1916	Nomenclature committee on enemy place names	
1918	Board of Inquiry into charge against the Surveyor-General Mr. N.W. Pethick	
1922	Committee appointed to inquire into dairy questions on River Murray reclaimed swamp areas	
1927	Special Committee on state finance	
1927	(Committee on) financial effect of Federation on South Australia	
1930–1931	Committee of Enquiry into education	
1930–1933	Local government commission appointed under the Local Government Areas Re-arrangement Act 1929	Sir Edgar Bean; Walter Rogers; Richard Gibbins; Samuel Reeves; Frederick Wilson
1931	Special committee upon soldier settlement and irrigation	
1931	Agricultural settlement committee	
1931–1932	Committee of Enquiry into the Adelaide Electric Supply Co. Ltd.	
1932–1933	Committee to investigate the question of debt adjustment in respect of the agricultural and pastoral industries	
1934	Investigation committee on the Advances for Homes Acts	
1934	Committee of Inquiry on the effect of the legislation of the Commonwealth and the eastern states controlling butter and cheese, and a Commonwealth price stabilisation scheme for South Australia, or a state controlled scheme	
1935–1936	Honorary committee appointed by the Government to report upon the Road Traffic Act, 1934 and to make recommendations relating to traffic laws	
1935	Honorary committee on subordinate legislation	
1937	Committee on the operation of the South Australian Trading Stamp Act	
1937	The Committee on the proposed jetty at Port Victoria	
1937	Honorary committee on the manufacture and improvements in quality of South Australian butter	
1937–1938	State traffic committee	
1937–1938	Soil conservation committee	
1937	Building Act inquiry committee	
1938	Special committee appointed to inquire into the present ration scale and to advise the Government as to any desirable alterations or additions to the scale	
1938–1939	Committee appointed by the Government to inquire into delinquent and other children in the care of the State	
1939–1940	State traffic committee on main road lighting	
1940	Building Act inquiry committee	
1942–1949	Education inquiry committee appointed by the Government of South Australia	
1943	Committee of inquiry into electricity supply for South Australia	
1943–1944	Country freezing works committee	A. W. Pope (chairman and general manager of the Government Produce Department), A. S. Kidman, W. Robinson
1944–1945	Special committee of milk-in-schools inquiry	Dr A. Southwood (chairman), Dr Helen Mayo, Professor M. L. Mitchell
1945–1946	South Australian regional planning committee	
1946–1947	Pastoral and marginal agricultural areas inquiry committee	Charles Melville (Chairman)
1946	Committee of Inquiry for consolidating the health services of the State	Mr. Shannon, Mr. Duncan MP, Dr. A. R. Southwood (chairman of the Central Board of Health), Dr. H. M. Jay (representing the British Medical Association), Dr. E. Sandford Morgan (lay practitioner)
2004–2008	Children in State Care Commission of Inquiry	Ted Mullighan QC

== See also ==
- List of Australian royal commissions
