= Royal Commission into Early Childhood Education and Care =

Royal commission in South Australia

- Date: 16 October 2022 – 27 August 2023
- Duration: 10 months
- Location: South Australia, Australia
- Type: Royal commission
- Outcome: 43 recommendations; Office for Early Childhood Development established
- Commissioner: Julia Gillard
- Counsel assisting: Sarah Attar
- Final report: Royal Commission into Early Childhood Education and Care Report

The Royal Commission into Early Childhood Education and Care was a South Australian royal commission established in 2022 to examine support for families during the first 1,000 days of a child's life, universal preschool for three- and four-year-olds, and access to out-of-school-hours care for preschool and primary school children. The inquiry was launched following the South Australian Labor Party's commitment prior to the 2022 state election. On 16 October 2022, Governor Frances Adamson appointed former Prime Minister Julia Gillard as the royal commissioner by letters patent. Sarah Attar served as counsel assisting.

The interim report was issued on 17 April 2023, and it included 33 recommendations in principle regarding the implementation of universal preschool for three-year-olds. The final report was submitted to the governor on 11 August 2023 and then was released publicly on 27 August. In total, the final report included 43 recommendations, among which was a phased implementation of low-cost preschool for children aged three from 2026 with universal access by 2032. The commission recommended reducing the number of developmentally vulnerable South Australian children starting school from 23.8% to 15%.

Thirteen of the recommendations were accepted by the South Australian government at first, and the government committed A$70 million to begin implementing the recommendations. Of the remaining recommendations, all were accepted except two in the government's response in February 2024 in the report titled A New Perspective on Early Childhood Development, while alternative suggestions were made for those two recommendations. An Office for Early Childhood Development was established by the government to oversee the changes. The phased roll-out of 3-year-old preschool started in 2026.

== Background ==
According to the Australian Early Development Census of 2021, 23.8% of the children in South Australia were found to be developmentally vulnerable in at least one domain out of five domains assessed during their first year at school, compared with the national average of 22.0%. Furthermore, in South Australia, 12.7% were developmentally vulnerable in two or more domains, compared with 11.4% nationally.

South Australian Labor Party, in its 23 October 2021 state conference, declared that its government would conduct a Royal Commission into Early Childhood Education and Care if it wins the 2022 South Australian state election. It also promised free preschool education to all three-year-old children in South Australia from 2026 onwards. Then-Opposition Leader Peter Malinauskas added that through such an inquiry, Labor would assess how the promise can be delivered and funded and the availability and affordability of early childhood education. Among the other issues that the inquiry will address, according to Labor's election policy, are assistance during the initial 1,000 days of a child's life, universal preschool for 3–4 year olds, and after-school services for preschool and primary students.

A childcare centre in Glandore, South Australia, in 2013

In a study conducted by the Mitchell Institute in March 2022, the median ratio of childcare places per child aged 0–4 in a typical South Australian suburb stood at 0.34 compared to 0.385 across Australia. In Greater Adelaide, childcare access was high closer to the city centre while there was low or no childcare service provision in some outer suburbs. According to an article in ABC News, 82% of South Australians in regional areas live in childcare desert regions compared to 36% of residents in metropolitan areas.

Following the Labor government win, Premier Malinauskas made an announcement that the committee would be allocated a budget of A$2.45 million. An interim report is anticipated in April 2023 with recommendations due for completion on 31 August 2023. The investigation also sought to establish how improved access to childcare services could allow more people to join the workforce.

== Terms of reference ==
Three main aspects were the subject of investigation, according to the letters patent on 16 October 2022:

- Family support to South Australian children under the age of 1,000 days, including improvements in early childhood education and care services.
- High-quality universal preschool for three- and four-year-olds, taking into consideration factors such as accessibility, cost and quality of service, and the introduction of universal preschool for three-year-olds from 2026.
- Out-of-school hours care for all children at preschool and primary school ages, considering statewide access, cost and quality.

In addition, the commission was to review the potential impact of increased childcare services and flexible hours in schools on parents' workforce participation. The commission was to consider the capacity of the early childhood sector, the feasibility and cost of non-governmental services, and any variations in service provision in rural, regional and remote South Australia.

The letters patent mandated the commission to seek the views of parents and carers from a variety of backgrounds, experts in early childhood development, service providers for families with children under the age of 1,000 days, directors of preschools and long day care centres, and trade unions representing early childhood workers. In formulating its recommendations, the commission was to consider the economic and other impacts on the welfare of children, families and communities. It could recommend changes to policies, laws, administration and organisational arrangements within the sector.

The final report was to be provided by 31 August 2023. Interim reports could be issued by the commissioner before that date.

== Commissioner and executive ==
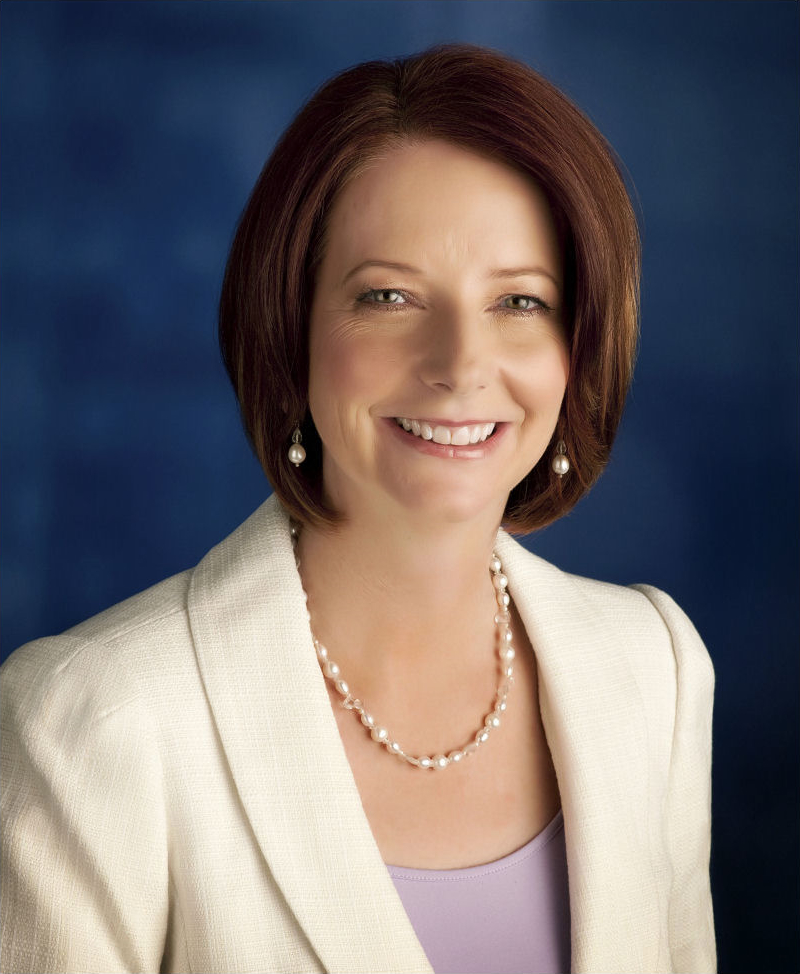
Gillard in 2010

On 16 October 2022, Governor Frances Adamson appointed the former Prime Minister Julia Gillard as royal commissioner through letters patent under the Royal Commissions Act 1917.

The commission was based in the Attorney-General's Department. Caroline Croser-Barlow served as the executive director for the team that assisted with the inquiry. Belinda Marsden was the director while Sarah Attar was counsel assisting the commission.

Gillard headed the commission's Expert Advisory Group which offered advice on how to conduct the inquiry and what evidence to collect. Members of the group were experts in early childhood development, education, health and public policy. The group consisted of Anne Glover, Sally Brinkman, Leslie Loble, Danielle Wood, April Lawrie, Lisa Paul and Brett McDermott.

== Submissions ==
Submissions were sought from families, teachers, organizations, experts, trade unions, and others from the community. Contributors could discuss anything in the terms of reference. The commission issued guiding questions on support for the first 1,000 days of children's lives, universal preschool education, availability of out-of-school-hour care, and workforce capacity. Contributions could be submitted through online, postal, and email methods, and contributors could ask for complete or partial confidentiality of their contributions.

By the time the commission was writing its interim report, it had received over 60 formal submissions. The submissions could be viewed at the commission's website depending on contributors' confidentiality requirements. The formal submission period ended on 19 May 2023.

The commission received over 160 submissions in two rounds, related to the questions that guided the inquiry and comments on the interim report. It took the feedback into account when making its final recommendations.

The commission convened eight roundtables featuring experts and service providers. These included the discussion about support for children and families in the first 1,000 days of their livethe s, impact of preschool for th-year-oldsold on children and families, educators and providers, and strategies for enhancing access to out-of-school-hours care. Another roundtable was organised to discuss the importance of early childhood education and care services in Adelaide's northern suburbs and other communities facing substantial disadvantage.

Moreover, two online surveys were undertaken by the commission using YourSAy. These included the survey involving parents, families and carers regarding their experience with early childhood education and care and the survey of out-of-school-hours care providers dealing with preschool and primary school children.

Three online forums were run by the commission in order for parents and caregivers to speak about their experience with early childhood education and care. The forum that was run by Gillard was on 31 January 2023 and included Georgie Dent of The Parenthood, Kaurna early childhood educator Auntie Suzanne Russell, and Lynne Rutherford of Gowrie SA.

== Public hearings ==
The public hearing began on 25 January 2023 with an address from Gillard followed by a Welcome to Country ceremony by Cliffy Wilson. The first witness was Victoria Whitington, who served as the presiding member of the state's Child Development Council. She testified about available information regarding the development of children in South Australia in comparison with other states. Counsel assisting, Attar, also presented Rhiannon Pilkington whose testimony dealt with factors influencing children's developmental results.

In six days of public hearings, 38 witnesses were heard concerning child development, research, services accessibility and workforce issues. Among them was a hearing on early childhood services in Adelaide's northern suburbs. All the public hearings were broadcasd by the royal commission through its website.

== Reports ==
=== Interim report ===
An interim report of the commission was issued on 17 April 2023. It put forward 33 recommendations in principle regarding planning and implementation of universal preschool for three-year-olds. This included the proposal of an entitlement of at least 600 hours annually, which equals 15 hours per week for 40 weeks, and up to 30 hours per week for those children at greatest risk of experiencing developmental delays. The report suggested that the phased introduction begin in 2026, with the completion of the first phase in 2029, and universal preschool for three-year-olds be introduced in 2032.

The commission recommended preschool be provided through a partnership between government and non-government bodies, which includes long day care centres. The modeling that was done for the proposed delivery system indicated a yearly recurrent cost of $162 million and construction costs of $111.2 million for 32 new preschools.

=== Final report ===
The report by the commission was delivered to the Governor Adamson on 11 August 2023. The report had 43 recommendations, which were made public on 27 August 2023. It suggested that there should be universal availability of affordable preschool to three-year-olds by 2032, where 15 hours per week would be provided as well as 30 hours for those needing further assistance.

Additionally, the commission suggested the expansion of child development assessments and improving the provision of information for parents and caregivers. Concerning the Overseas Student Health Cover, it was suggested that demand be identified in government schools and alternative models of care be tried out in government preschools.

== Outcomes ==
=== Government response ===
It put forward a target period of 20 years within which the percentage of South Australian children who would start schooling being developmentally vulnerable in at least one domain would be reduced from 23.8% to 15%.

In the course of the final report on 27 August 2023, the Malinauskas government endorsed 13 of the 43 recommendations made by the commission and allocated $70 million for the implementation of the recommendations. The South Australian Government also proposed to conduct out-of-school-hours care at preschools in 2024. In addition, the Office for Early Childhood development was created as an office of the Department for Education on 31 August 2023.

The government responded with its formal response titled A New Perspective on Early Childhood Development. The response adopted or accepted in principle all except two of the remaining recommendations and offered an alternative to the two recommendations. In regard to recommendation 10, the alternative was to explain what support was going to be available to regional communities that lack childcare and who is eligible for support in developing a business case. With recommendation 38, the alternative was to maintain a range of providers of out-of-school-hours care at government schools.

=== Implementation ===
As a result of recommendation 43 in July 2024, South Australia started piloting Kindy Care as an approach to evaluate means of delivering services during the periods when children are not attending their regular preschools. As of 7 August 2024, the pilot program was initiated in one of the twenty government preschools selected for participation in the pilot. Under the pilot program plan announced in August, ten facilities were chosen to deliver care under the staff of Department for Education, while other ten provided care from third parties.

The Office for Early Childhood Development Act 2024 was commenced on 6 March 2025.

Kindy Care was already operational in 20 government-run preschools in South Australia by June 2025. Additional funding amounting to $3 million was awarded on 6 June to extend the trial into 2026.

The phased implementation of preschool programs for three-year-olds commenced in 2026 through the Flying Start reforms. During the first phase, more than 200 long day care centers and 45 government preschools provided the service. The first phase involved rural and regional areas along with three demonstration sites in metropolitan areas.

In addition to responding to the commission's recommendations in other ways, the government also extended the weekly hours of preschool attendance for indigenous children and children in care, who attended a government preschool for 12 hours per week, from 12 to 15 hours per week.

== See also ==
- Plowden Report
- Universal preschool
- National Quality Framework
