= James Biggs =

James Biggs may refer to:

- James Crawford Biggs (1872–1960), American lawyer and politician,
- James Hesketh Biggs, painter, photographer and engraver in South Australia
