= Greg James (judge) =

Australian judge (born 1944)

The Honourable Greg James AM, KC

Justice of the Supreme Court of New South Wales
- In office 1998–2005

Personal details
- Born: Gregory Reginald James; 15 September 1944 (age 82)
- Spouse: Barbara Ramjan
- Children: Evan James, Liam James
- Occupation: Jurist; Barrister

Gregory Reginald James AM, KC (born 15 September 1944) is a former judge of the Supreme Court of New South Wales.

Admitted as a barrister in 1972, at age 38 in 1982, James was one of the youngest Queen's Counsels ever appointed in New South Wales. He was one of several counsel involved in legal proceedings in the aftermath of the 1970 Bathurst Gaol riots, as well as lead counsel for the Bandidos Motorcycle Club during the Milperra massacre trial, one of the largest single trials in Australian history.

== Biography ==
He was educated at North Sydney Boys High School and Sydney University.

He was a founding member of Barristers Services Co-operative Limited, which founded Frederick Jordan Chambers, the largest single group of barristers in New South Wales in 1972.

He was appointed as a part-time Commissioner for the NSW Law Reform Commission from 1985 to 1989 and again since 1999. He was appointed Counsel for Veterans during the Royal Commission into British nuclear tests in Australia from 1984-1985. In 1988 he was appointed as an Associate Judge of the District Court of New South Wales, serving in this role until 1990.

In 1989 he, along with a number of other barristers, founded Forbes Chambers at 185 Elizabeth Street, Sydney creating a specialist criminal chambers with no traditional head of chambers hierarchy.

He was asked and accepted the role of prosecutor for the first Australian War crimes prosecution during the period 1990 to 1994 and led the prosecution during the trial of Ivan Polyukhovich for the 1942 murder of 850 Jews in Ukraine.

In 1998 he was appointed as a judge of the Supreme Court of New South Wales, holding that position until his retirement in 2005. Upon his retirement he was appointed Royal Commissioner for the Kapunda Road Royal Commission. Upon the completion of the Royal Commission, he was invited by the RAMSI mission to Solomon Islands to contribute to the ongoing education of judges and magistrates in Solomon Islands. Upon his return from Solomon Islands he was asked to assist with the reform of mental health law and processes in New South Wales and reform the state's criminal law with respect to persons with a mental illness. He was also appointed the president of the Mental Health Review Tribunal of New South Wales, he stepped down from that position in 2012 in order to return to the Bar.

He has been a chair on the Law Advisory Committee at Southern Cross University since 2007, teaching advocacy at the Southern Cross University's Summer School for more than 10 years. He is an adjunct professor at Southern Cross University and was awarded a Doctorate of Laws (Honorius Causa) of that university in 2012, and chairs the curriculum committee for the law school at the University of Western Sydney.

He has been the honorary legal counsel of Scouts New South Wales for over 10 years, retiring from the role in 2019. He received Scouts’ National Presidents Award on World Scout Day 2020.

== Honours and awards ==
In 2012 he was appointed as a Member of General Division of the Order of Australia (AM) for services to judicial education, mental health law reform, international relations and administration of criminal justice.

He is recognised as one of Australia's leading appellate court counsel, as well as one of the Australia's greatest criminal counsel. He resumed full-time practice as a barrister in mid-2012 taking chambers at Frederick Jordan Chambers. He has since joined as a member and taken chambers at 11 Garfield Barwick Chambers.

== Personal life ==
He is keen surfer, skier, and an avid rugby union fan.

James is married to Barbara Ramjan.
