= Nick Xenophon =

Australian politician (born 1959)

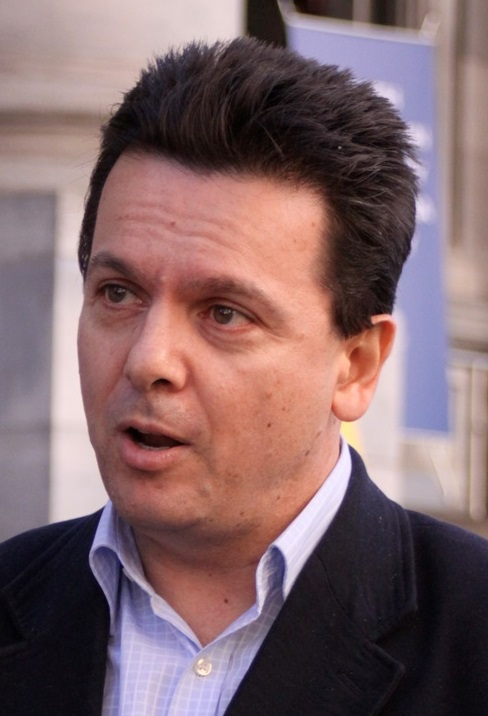
- Xenophon in 2009

Senator for South Australia
- In office 1 July 2008 – 31 October 2017
- Succeeded by: Rex Patrick

Member of the South Australian Legislative Council
- In office 11 October 1997 – 15 October 2007

Leader of Independent No Pokies Campaign Group
- In office 13 September 1997 – 1 July 2013 as No Pokies
- Deputy: Ann Bressington
- Preceded by: Party established
- Succeeded by: John Darley
- In office as 1 July 2013 – 5 March 2017 as Nick Xenophon Team
- Deputy: Stirling Griff
- Preceded by: Party merged
- Succeeded by: Party dissolved
- In office 4 July 2017 – 17 March 2018 as SA-BEST
- Deputy: Kris Hanna
- Preceded by: Party rebranded
- Succeeded by: Frank Pangallo

Personal details
- Born: Nicholas Xenophou; 29 January 1959 (age 67) Adelaide, South Australia, Australia
- Citizenship: Australian; British Overseas (renounced); Greek (renounced)
- Party: Independent (1997–2013, 2018–2022)
- Other political affiliations: Liberal (1976–1981); No Pokies (1997–2013); Nick Xenophon Team (2013–2018); SA Best (2017–2018)
- Spouse: Sandra Kazubiernis (m. 1990; div. 2007)
- Children: 2
- Education: Prince Alfred College; University of Adelaide (LLB)
- Occupation: Law firm principal (Xenophon & Co. Lawyers)
- Profession: Solicitor; Politician

Nick Xenophon (né Nicholas Xenophou; Greek: Νικόλαος Ξενοφού, romanized: Nikólaos Ksenofoú; born 29 January 1959) is an Australian lawyer and former politician who was a Senator for South Australia from 2008 until 2017. As a centrist, populist, independent politician, he twice shared the balance of power in the Australian Senate (from 2008 to 2010, 2014 to 2017). Xenophon was widely regarded as being among the most powerful politicians in Australia and among the most electorally successful independent politicians in Australian history, eventually able to form a political party: Nick Xenophon Team federally, and Nick Xenophon's SA-BEST in the state of South Australia.

From 1997 to 2007, he was a member of the South Australian Legislative Council, serving as an independent on a No Pokies policy platform. When the Nick Xenophon Team changed its name to Centre Alliance, Xenophon himself ceased to be directly involved with the party. Xenophon initially focused on his central anti-gambling policy, but came to advocate for other issues in federal parliament such as civil liberties, defence, education, foreign policy, health, infrastructure, manufacturing, national security, and regional affairs. Xenophon failed in his central mission to have poker machines curbed or eliminated in a lasting way, but was instrumental in the Rudd government's repeal of WorkChoices legislation and the passage of the economic stimulus package, as well as the Abbott government's repeal of the Clean Energy Act 2011. Additionally, Xenophon was pivotal in the obstruction of the Abbott government's 2014 austerity budget, the plan to build next generation submarines overseas, and the Pyne higher education reforms.

In October 2017, Xenophon resigned from the Australian Senate to contest a seat in the House of Assembly at the 2018 South Australian state election. Polls suggested that Xenophon's party may have been able to form government, however by election day support had collapsed, and Xenophon was not elected to a lower house seat. He tried to re-enter the Senate in 2022 but received less than 3 percent of the vote, the lowest performance at an election since his first statewide result in 1997.

== Early life ==
Nick Xenophon was born Nicholas Xenophou in Adelaide, South Australia, to Theo Xenophou from Cyprus, and Georgia from Greece as the oldest of two children. Xenophon attended Prince Alfred College from 1965 to 1976 where he achieved three As in English, Mathematics and Economics, and his father was involved with college fundraising. He studied for a Bachelor of Laws at the University of Adelaide. From 1976 until 1981, he was a member of the Liberal Party of Australia and the Young Liberals. In his first year, Xenophon was elected on the Adelaide University Liberal Club ticket to On Dit student magazine. In his university days Xenophon was a reactionary conservative who held numerous views against women's liberation, gay rights, squatters' rights, Marxism, the anti-Apartheid movement, the anti-nuclear movement and the anti-free traders (all views he later departed from). At the end of his eighteen-month term, Xenophon wrote as a whistleblower in On Dit that the Young Liberals had rigged the 1976–77 vote in order to secure the unlikely victory of their editing team. According to Xenophon, the party politics of the On Dit incident disenchanted him, although some Labor members maintain that he considered joining the Australian Labor Party while at university.

In 2015, the publishers of former Labor Prime Minister Julia Gillard's 2014 memoir, My Story, retracted an allegation and made a public apology after writing that Xenophon had been "infamously excluded from university for a period as punishment for stuffing a ballot box full of voting papers he had somehow procured".

== Legal career ==
In 1982 and 1983, Xenophon worked as a lawyer in the private practice of Jacob van Dissel. In 1984, van Dissel gave Xenophon the personal injury part of his practice, enabling Xenophon to become principal of his new firm, Xenophon & Co. Lawyers. The firm dealt primarily with workers compensation and personal injury claims on a no-win-no-fee basis.

In 1994 and 1997, Xenophon served as President of the South Australian branch of the Australian Plaintiff Lawyers' Association. During this time, he also taught law at the University of South Australia, where his future political opponent Christopher Pyne was among his students.

In 2019, the Australian Financial Review reported that his law firm was representing Chinese telecommunications firm Huawei, who Xenophon claims have "been treated incredibly unfairly". He also represented the military whistleblower, David McBride.

In 2024, Xenophon transferred his legal practice to a different firm who took on his staff and clients. Xenophon remained involved as a consultant.

== Political views ==
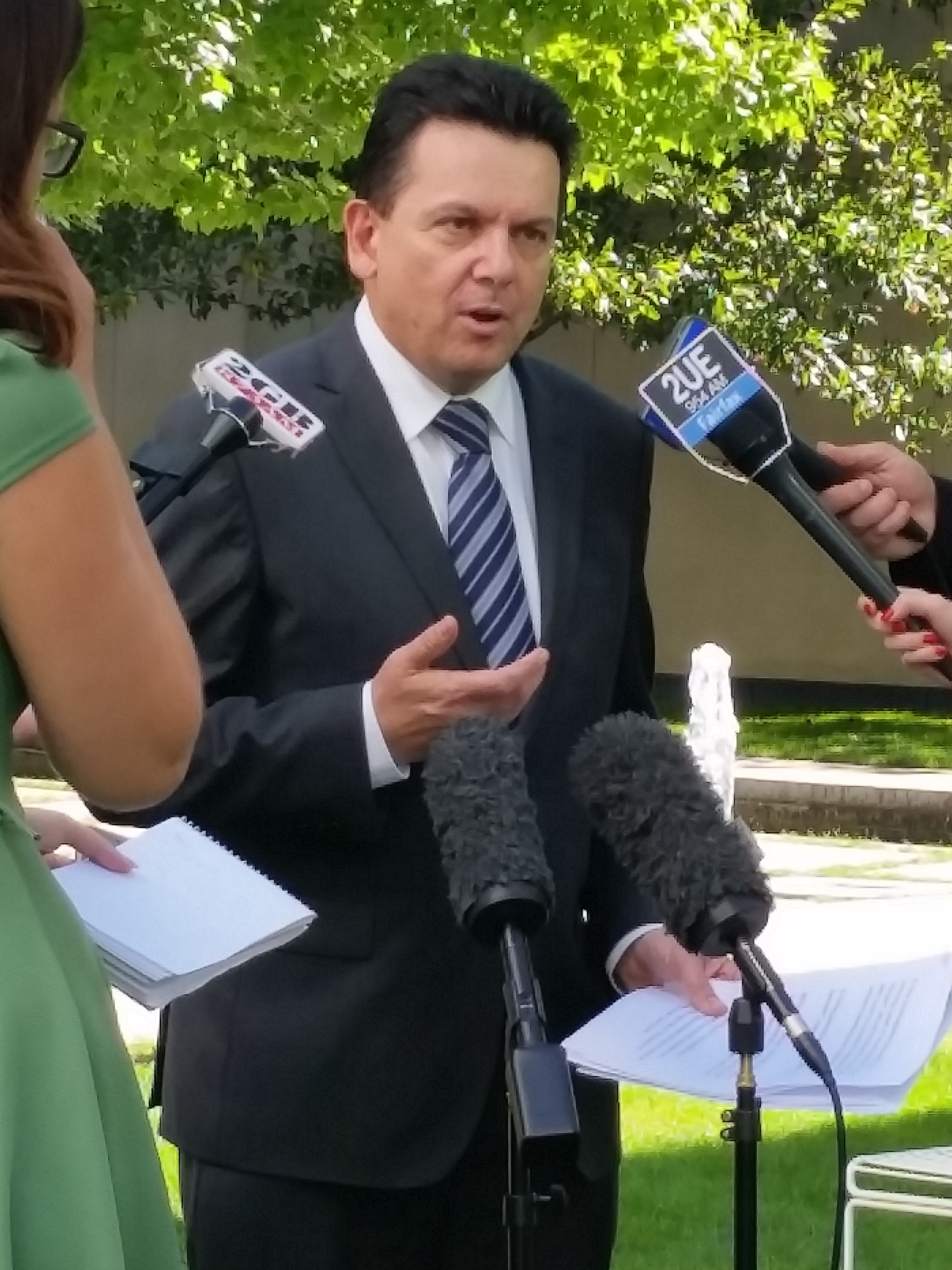
Xenophon speaking to the media at Parliament House, Canberra, 2015

Xenophon considers himself to be a centrist politician with strong views against poker machine gambling.

In 2008, The Australian quoted many Liberal and Labor politicians who believed Xenophon had shown himself to be a "lightweight" political opportunist during his decade in state politics.

In 2010, Xenophon sought to introduce anti-cult legislation similar to that of France's anti-cult legislation, primarily targeting the Church of Scientology and its tax-exempt status.

In 2012, Xenophon co-sponsored a bill with Victorian Senator John Madigan to restrict federal government subsidies for wind farms. Xenophon's concerns about wind turbines were predominantly related to anecdotal evidence of health problems and the reliability of wind-sourced power.

In 2015, Xenophon appealed in person to Indonesia's largest Islamic body to support a reprieve for two Australian convicted drug smugglers sentenced to death in Bali. Xenophon's translator reportedly stated, “We are aware that the death penalty is the right of the Indonesian government. Therefore, we do not ask that it be cancelled but plead that it be delayed”.

In 2018 during the 2018 South Australian state election, Xenophon and his party pushed for a law that crystal methamphetamine users in South Australia will be forced into drug rehabilitation.

== Political career ==
=== South Australian Legislative Council (1997–2007) ===
At the 1997 state election, Xenophon stood for the South Australian Legislative Council under an independent No Pokies ticket, advocating the reduction and abolition of poker machines (colloquially known as "pokies"). He received a vote of 2.86 percent, a statewide total of 25,630 votes – much less than the 8.33 per cent needed to be elected in his own right – but by receiving a large number of preferences first from microparties and then from Grey Power, he went from a quota of 0.34 to 1.08 and was therefore elected. This made Xenophon the first independent elected to the Legislative Council in 60 years.

Following the 1997 election, the Olsen Liberal government needed the support of an additional two non-Liberal upper house members in order to pass legislation, with the Australian Democrats retaining the balance of power on three seats. However, defectors from Labor in the upper house, Terry Cameron and Trevor Crothers, often brought Xenophon in to play. In 1998, Xenophon voted with Cameron and the government to proceed with the second reading of the ETSA power sale bill. The bill became law when Cameron and Crothers voted with the Liberal government, although Xenophon voted against the bill in its final form. Following the election of the Rann Labor government at the 2002 state election, the government needed an additional five non-Labor upper house members to pass legislation, giving a shared balance of power to the Democrats on three seats, incumbent independents Xenophon and Cameron, with the Family First Party winning their first seat.

Xenophon was an activist for a range of issues apart from the elimination of poker machines, speaking out on consumer rights, essential services, the environment, taxation, and perks for politicians. Xenophon was also vocal in the Eugene McGee hit and run affair, becoming an advocate for the victim's wife, with public opinion eventually forcing the Kapunda Road Royal Commission that led to harsher laws for hit and run offences.

At the 2006 state election, he ran an aggressive campaign and attracted considerable publicity through a range of imaginative stunts, including riding a model locomotive "gravy train" outside Parliament House to protest MPs' superannuation entitlements, parading along Rundle Mall wearing a sandwich board to advertise his campaign, and bringing a small goat to Parliament urging voters not to "kid around" with their vote.

Despite media speculation that he would struggle to be re-elected due to the major parties preferencing against him, he attracted sufficient funding and volunteers to staff most state booths on polling day. He received 190,958 first preferences or 20.51 per cent of the total vote, enough to not only be re-elected himself, but also to elect the second No Pokies candidate, Ann Bressington. His total was 5.46 per cent less than the Liberal Party, and he outpolled the Liberals in some booths, including the electoral district of Enfield. With the Labor government needing four non-Labor upper house members to pass legislation, No Pokies on two seats shared the balance of power with Family First on two seats, the Democrats on one seat, with the SA Greens winning their first seat.

=== Australian Senate (2008–2017) ===
==== 2007 election campaign ====
On 11 October 2007, Xenophon called a press conference at the Adelaide Zoo in front of the giraffe enclosure, declaring he would "stick his neck out for South Australia" by announcing his resignation from the South Australian Legislative Council in an attempt to gain election to the Australian Senate at the 2007 federal election. His platform consisted of anti-gambling and consumer protection measures, attention to the water crisis affecting the Murray River, ratifying Kyoto, opposition against a "decrease in state rights", and opposition to WorkChoices. Nick Minchin, a Liberal senator from South Australia, urged people not to vote for Xenophon. Due to running as an independent Xenophon's name did not appear above the line on the ticket, instead he was represented only by the letter "S" above the line, with voters having to search for his details.

As Xenophon had vacated his Legislative Council seat to run for the Senate, a joint sitting of the South Australian parliament was convened for 21 November 2007 to select Xenophon's replacement. Former valuer-general John Darley, who had stood as the third candidate on Xenophon's ticket in 2006, was appointed. During the joint sitting convened to confirm the nomination, Ann Bressington criticised Xenophon, questioning his integrity and suitability for federal parliament, suggesting that his "anti-politician" image was more spin than reality. She also said Xenophon had demanded she contribute AU$50,000 towards campaign expenses at the 2006 state election. Xenophon said in response that he was "shocked and hurt" and "deeply upset" that she had failed to share her concerns with him in person, saying "privately and publicly, I have been very supportive of her."

Some whose causes Xenophon had championed also came forward to defend Xenophon, including Di Gilcrist, whose husband's hit and run death resulted in the Kapunda Road Royal Commission. In an interview the following day, Gilcrist said "based on my experience not only as a victim who's dealt with Nick but also somebody who's worked with Nick and his office... Nick is passionate and he cares and he is empathetic. And he is truly committed." Lower House independent Kris Hanna also defended Xenophon, arguing Bressington had "obviously been out to do some damage" and injure Xenophon's election chances.

Towards the end of the campaign, Xenophon walked a large mule down Rundle Mall to symbolise his stubbornness. He received 14.78 percent of the vote. This was down from his 2006 state election result of over 20%.

==== First term (2008–2014) ====
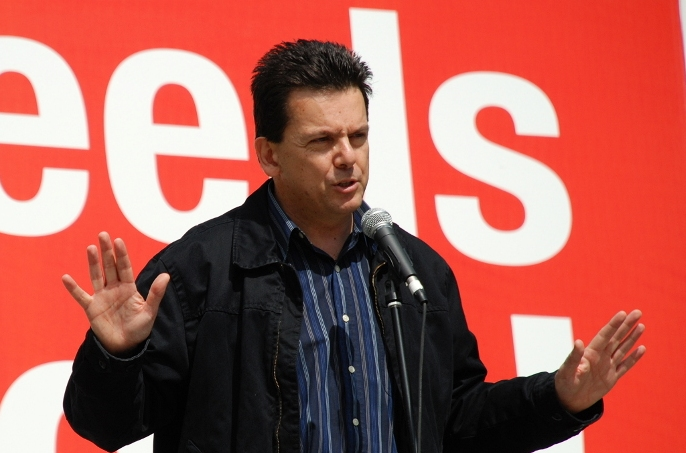
Xenophon in September 2008

Xenophon shared the balance of power in the Senate with the Australian Greens and the Family First Party. The First Rudd government required the support of two crossbench senators or the opposition to pass legislation.

In February 2009, the Rudd government needed to pass its AU$42 billion economic stimulus package. Xenophon initially voted against the package, but ultimately voted in favour after amendments were made. Xenophon persuaded the government to bring forward AU$900 million in Murray-Darling basin funds and other water projects, which included AU$500 million over three years for water buybacks.

In November 2009, Xenophon labelled the Church of Scientology as a criminal organisation, alleging members had experienced blackmail, torture and violence, labour camps and forced imprisonment, and coerced abortions. On 7 September 2010, a Senate committee recommended that a charities commission be formed with the purpose of investigating and monitoring transparency of charitable organisations. This recommendation received bipartisan support.

In July 2011, Xenophon lost the balance of power to the Greens, however his anti-pokies stance was bolstered when independent Andrew Wilkie was elected to the lower house at the 2010 election, resulting in a hung parliament. Wilkie had campaigned heavily against pokies at the election. In exchange for Wilkie's support, the Gillard government legislated for mandatory precommitment technology which would require people using high-bet machines to pre-commit how much they were willing to bet on a machine before actually playing, as well as introducing safer AU$1 maximum bet per spin machines, which would not require pre-commitment. The plan came under sustained attack from sporting clubs and various businesses that financially benefit from poker machine use.

In September 2011, Xenophon controversially used parliamentary privilege to accuse a Catholic priest of rape, in regard to accusations around events that occurred in the 1960s. He also accused Monsignor David Cappo and Philip Wilson, the Catholic Archbishop of Adelaide, of failing to properly investigate the allegations in 2007. All three men denied the senator's claims. Xenophon chose such action after receiving an "unsatisfactory" response from the Church when advising them of his intentions and ultimatum. Cappo subsequently stepped down from several of his public positions. Several days later, after high-level media coverage, Xenophon indicated he might not have used parliamentary privilege had he known the person he accused was about to take a period of leave.

In November 2011, Xenophon voted against the Clean Energy Bill. The carbon pricing scheme passed with the Labor government receiving Green support for the legislation in the Senate.

In May 2012, Xenophon – a vocal supporter of opposition leader Anwar Ibrahim – visited Malaysia to independently observe anti-government protests. The New Straits Times questioned Xenophon's impartiality in an article, which included part of his 2009 speech criticising Scientology. The newspaper replaced Scientology with the word Islam. Xenophon threatened to sue for defamation, and the article was removed from the newspaper's website.

In February 2013, Xenophon attempted independently to revisit Malaysia but was detained by immigration authorities at Kuala Lumpur airport. He was later sent back to Australia. It was confirmed that Xenophon was not on an Australian Delegation list scheduled to meet the Malaysian parliamentary affairs minister.

==== 2013 election campaign ====
During the 2013 federal election, Xenophon nominated four key policy issues; gaming machine reforms, stopping palm oil from being sold in Australia, breaking up the supermarket duopoly, and better deals for Riverland irrigators in the Murray-Darling basin rescue plan. Xenophon's voting result increased to 24.9 percent, a few percent short of two quotas. A record number of candidates stood at the election. Group voting tickets came under scrutiny because multiple candidates were provisionally elected with the vast majority of their 14.3 percent quotas coming from the preferences of other parties across the political spectrum.

==== Second term (2014–2016) ====
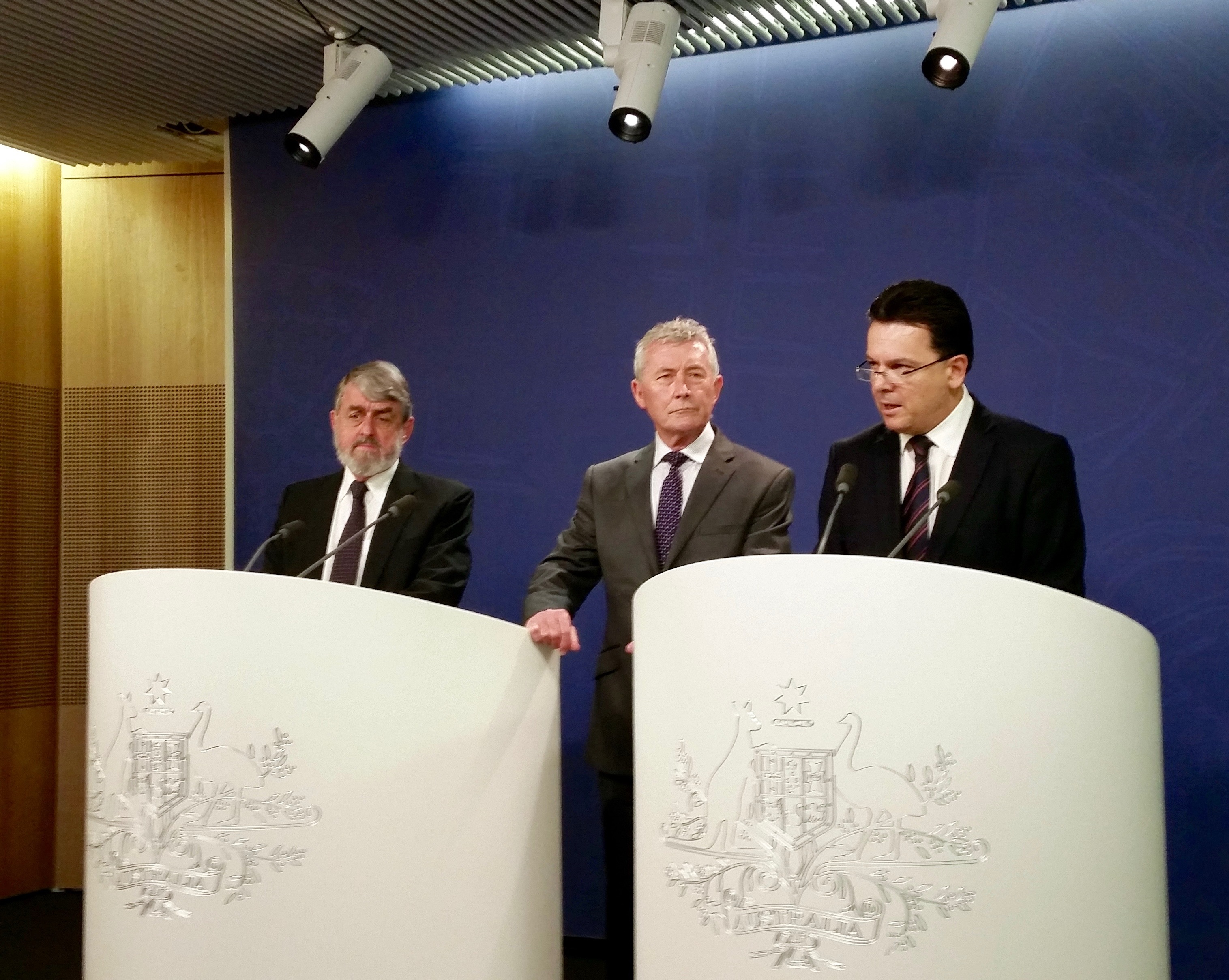
Xenophon calling for a Royal Commission into the Australia-East Timor spying scandal in November 2015.

After returning to a balance of power position in the Senate, Xenophon focused on defence (particularly the Collins-class submarine replacement project) and cuts made by the Abbott government in the 2014 Australian federal budget.

In October 2014, Xenophon supported the Abbott government's Direct Action plan for combatting Climate Change, enabling it to pass the Senate. However, he later stated that the plan had been "neutered" because of changes made to it via regulation.

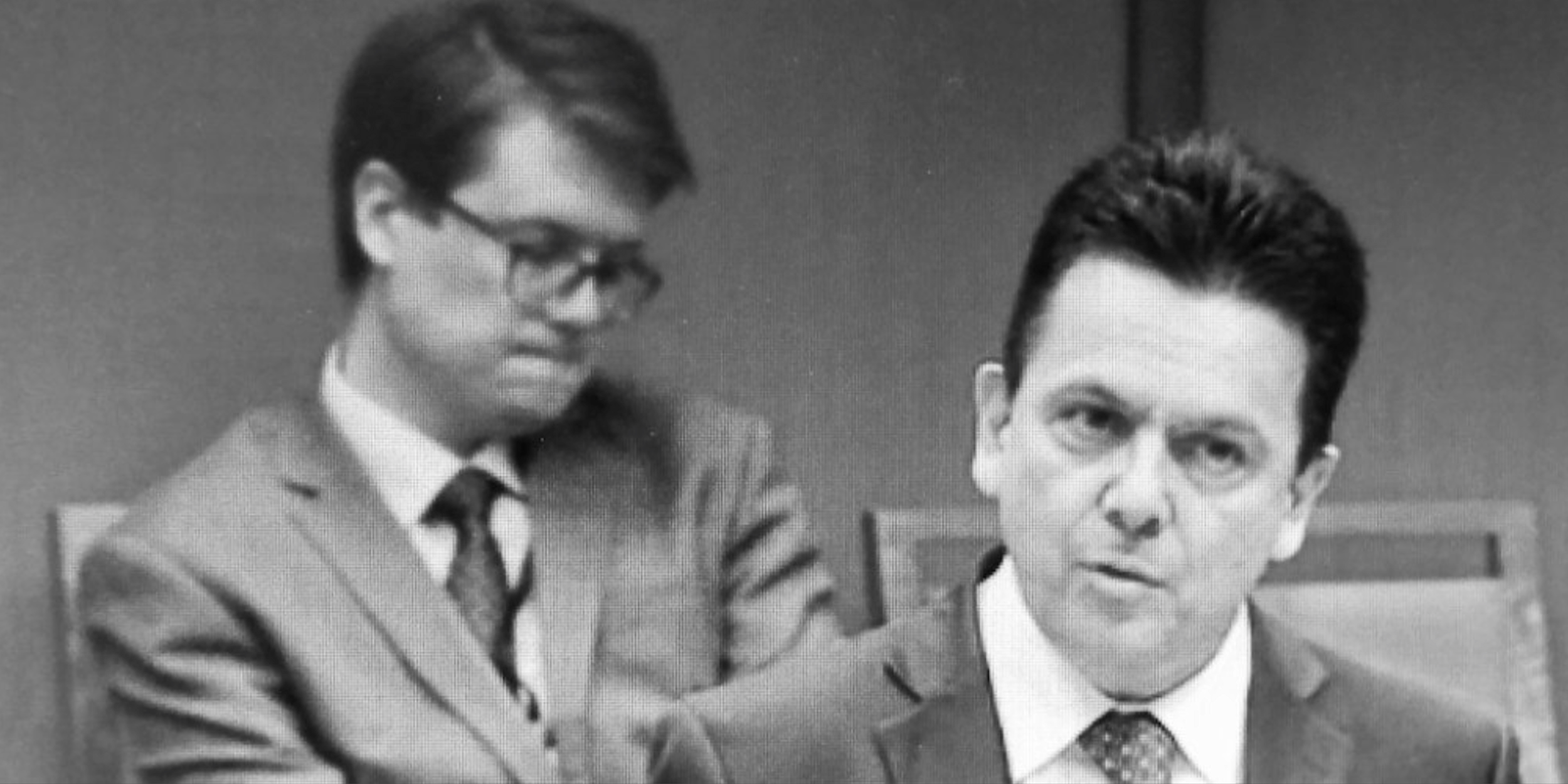
Xenophon with his then staff member, C. J. Coventry, in the Senate in 2015.

In December 2014, Xenophon voted against the tertiary education reforms proposed by Minister for Education and Training Christopher Pyne which would have seen a shift towards privatisation of universities in Australia.

In March 2015, Xenophon opposed the amendments to the national security legislative framework, particularly on the issue of telecommunications data retention. In his 2014 "spycatcher" speech to the Senate, Xenophon stated that the new laws would have a chilling effect on investigative journalism in Australia. Xenophon negotiated with then Minister for Immigration and Border Protection Scott Morrison for the reintroduction of the Temporary Protection Visa.

In March 2015, Xenophon independently travelled to Indonesia with an Adelaide sheikh to unsuccessfully seek clemency for the Bali Nine duo who were on death row.

In November 2015, Xenophon joined calls for a royal commission into the Australia-East Timor spying scandal.

In February 2016, Xenophon joined with the Australian Greens and the Government to support a reform of the Senate election system. Other crossbench senators, including John Madigan and David Leyonhjelm, whose re-election prospects would be bleak under the new voting arrangements, accused Xenophon of "political trickery of the highest order".

==== 2016 election campaign ====
During the 2016 federal election campaign, Xenophon was the subject of attacks from both major political parties, including his failure to declare a directorship of Adelaide Tower Pty Ltd, which involved his father. Xenophon accused proponents of a "partisan and personal campaign". Labor requested the Australian Electoral Commission investigate questionable loans given to Xenophon by businessman Ian Melrose.

==== Third term (2016–2017) ====
In August 2016, Xenophon and NXT colleagues opposed the proposed same-sex marriage plebiscite on the basis that it was not binding and a waste of public resources.

In March 2017, Xenophon announced that he would launch a new party in time for the 2018 South Australian state election. In July 2017, Nick Xenophon's SA-BEST was registered by the Electoral Commission of South Australia.

In August 2017, Xenophon became embroiled in the 2017 Australian parliamentary eligibility crisis and asked to be referred to the High Court for clarification of his 2016 eligibility. On 27 October 2017, the High Court found he had been eligible in 2016 to nominate and be validly elected.

In September 2017, the Turnbull government with the support of Nick Xenophon (by a vote of 31–27), was able to pass changes to media legislation including the repealing of the "two-out-of-three" rule (which allowed a company to own a TV station, newspaper and radio station in a single market) and the "reach rule" (which prevented a single TV broadcaster from reaching more than seventy-five per cent of the population).

On 6 October 2017, Xenophon announced that he would resign in order to stand for the Parliament of South Australia at the 2018 South Australian general election. On 31 October 2017, Xenophon resigned from the Senate, and was replaced by his party's senior advisor Rex Patrick.

=== Constitutional eligibility (2017) ===
On 19 August 2017, Xenophon announced that British authorities had confirmed that he was a British Overseas Citizen because his ethnic Greek father was born in Cyprus when it was a British colony. Xenophon's subsequent application to renounce that citizenship became effective on 30 August. Separately, Xenophon later said that he had already renounced Greek citizenship acquired through his mother. Xenophon asked the Australian government to have him referred to the High Court in the Court of Disputed Returns for consideration and clarification of his 2016 eligibility. On 27 October 2017, the High Court found that Xenophon had been eligible in 2016 to nominate and be validly elected.

=== South Australian House of Assembly (2018) ===
On 17 March 2018, Xenophon unsuccessfully contested the seat of Hartley in the South Australian House of Assembly at the 2018 South Australian state election. Although he came second on the primary vote ahead of Labor's Grace Portolesi by 202 votes, upon the preference distribution of the eliminated fourth-placed Greens candidate, Xenophon's 99 vote lead over Labor became a 357-vote deficit. Third-placed Xenophon was therefore eliminated, with Hartley reverting to the traditional Liberal vs Labor contest.

=== 2022 Senate election campaign ===
Xenophon announced on 24 March 2022 that he would once again run for the Australian Senate at the 2022 Australian federal election.

At the 2022 Australian Senate election, Xenophon attempted to make a comeback into federal politics, by running in South Australia as an independent lead candidate of the Group O ticket with Centre Alliance Senator Stirling Griff, in which both of them failed to get elected after gaining only 2.99% down from 21.76% at the 2016 Election when both were elected.

== After politics ==
On 2 December 2019, Huawei Australia announced that it had engaged Xenophon's services as an "external lawyer". The company was banned by the Australian government from providing 5G infrastructure. Xenophon said he would not be lobbying members of parliament on behalf of Huawei.

Xenophon continues to advocate for poker machine gambling reforms.

Xenophon, with two other co-owners, opened a Greek–Cypriot restaurant called Thanks to Theo in Adelaide in 2023 to honour his father who died in the same year. According to Google Maps, the restaurant is permanently closed as of March 2026.

== Personal life ==
In 1990, Xenophon married physiotherapist Sandra Kazubiernis. When their only child was born in 1992, Xenophon changed his own surname by deed poll from Xenophou to Xenophon, his paternal grandfather's surname. Kazubiernis and Xenophon separated in 1995 and later divorced. Xenophon had his second child in early 2019 with another partner. The relationship was reported to have ended before 2022.

In 2023, Xenophon was diagnosed with meningioma, a non-cancerous tumour in his brain. He underwent brain surgery in August 2025 to excise the tumour. The operation resulted in the collapse of the right side of his face and left him functionally blind and deaf on his right side. Xenophon plans to undergo a procedure to restore the equilibrium of the right side of his face and mouth.

=== Allegations of emotional abuse ===
In 2017, former staffer Jenny Low claimed, in response to an article appearing in The Australian, that she had been in a seven-year secret relationship with Xenophon that was psychologically abusive, "destructive" and detrimental to her career. Xenophon admitted that a relationship had commenced in 2007, but rejected any negative assertions. Before the 2022 federal election Xenophon was accused by another former partner of being emotionally abusive. Xenophon expressed regret but declined to comment on details.

== Filmography ==
- Kitchen Cabinet (2013) - Himself
- The House with Annabel Crabb (2017) - Himself
- The Ex-PM (2017) - Prime Minister
