= Malcolm Blue =

Australian judge

The Honourable Malcolm Blue KC

Judge of the Supreme Court of South Australia
- In office 4 August 2011 – 12 August 2024

Personal details
- Born: Malcolm Fraser Blue; 12 August 1954 (age 72) North Adelaide, South Australia
- Died: 7 September 2024 (aged 70)
- Citizenship: Australian
- Education: University of Adelaide
- Profession: Lawyer

Malcolm Fraser Blue KC (born 12 August 1954, in North Adelaide, South Australia) was a Justice of the Supreme Court of South Australia and a reserve Justice of the Supreme Court of Victoria.

== Career ==
A graduate of the University of Adelaide, he was admitted to legal practice in 1977 and was appointed King's Counsel in 2001. He was appointed to the Supreme Court on 12 August 2011. He was a member of the Australasian Institute of Judicial Administration.

In 2005 Blue represented fellow lawyer Eugene McGee at the Kapunda Road Royal Commission into the circumstances surrounding the hit and run death of Ian Humphrey, caused by McGee.

== Background ==
He is the son of Norman Blue and Patricia Blue (née Vogt) He went to Pembroke School. Blue died in an tractor accident at his family property on Saturday 7 September 2024.
