= Royal Commission in regard to Rupert Max Stuart =

1959 Royal Commission into the guilt of Rupert Max Stuart

- Date: 30 July 1959 – 3 December 1959
- Duration: 4 months
- Location: Adelaide, South Australia
- Type: Royal commission
- Commissioners: Sir Mellis Napier (chair); Sir Geoffrey Reed; D. Bruce Ross
- Counsel assisting: J. F. Brazel; C. J. Legoe
- Outcome: The evidence justified the jury's verdict and that there was no basis to find a miscarriage of justice.
- Final report: Report of the Royal Commission in regard to Rupert Max Stuart, tabled in the South Australian Legislative Council on 3 December 1959.

The Royal Commission in regard to Rupert Max Stuart was a South Australian Royal Commission into the guilt of Rupert Maxwell (Max) Stuart who was an Indigenous Australian who was accused of murder in 1959. His conviction was subject to several appeals to higher courts, the Judicial Committee of the Privy Council, before the creation of the Royal Commission, all of which upheld the verdict.

== Background ==
On Saturday 20 December 1958, Mary Olive Hattam, a nine-year-old girl, disappeared near the South Australian town of Ceduna (pop: 1,200), 768 km (477 mi) from Adelaide. A search commenced and Hattam's body was found in a small cave at 12.30 am. The 27-year-old Rupert Max Stuart, an Arrernte man, and teenager Alan Moir had been in Ceduna on 20 December, running the darts stall for the funfair operated by Mr and Mrs Norman Gieseman. Both had gone out drinking during the day and Moir returned late that night, losing consciousness several times due to intoxication. Stuart had been arrested for drinking alcohol at 9:30 pm and was in police custody. This was because, at the time, 'full-blooded' Aboriginal people were forbidden by law to drink alcohol.

When picked up Stuart was working for the Australian Wheat Board at Thevenard, 3 kilometres east of Ceduna. During interrogation, Stuart admitted being drunk and travelling from Ceduna to Thevenard on Saturday afternoon but denied the murder. Police took him outside and made him walk barefoot across sand, after which the two trackers confirmed that Stuart's tracks matched those on the beach. Stuart later confessed and, although he could not read or write, signed his typed confession with the only English he knew, his name, written in the block letters that had been taught him by his sister, misspelling his first name as "ROPERT".

Stuart's execution date was set for Tuesday, 7 July 1959, and the Executive Council, chaired by Premier Thomas Playford, was due to sit on 6 July to reply to any petitions presented. The Advertiser had devoted all its correspondence pages to Stuart with 75% of writers in favour of commutation. Petitions with thousands of signatures supporting commutation had already been received, but that morning the first petition supporting the execution arrived by telegram. The petition, circulated in Ceduna, Thevenard and the surrounding districts had 334 signatures. The Executive Council sat at 12:30 pm and considered the petitions for 20 minutes before issuing a statement: "The prisoner is left for execution in the due course of the law. No recommendation is made for pardon or reprieve." Stuart was told of the decision and given a cigarette. He was then informed that the execution would take place at 8 am the following morning. Father Dixon was requested to keep Stuart calm and he visited him that night. Asked if he was afraid, Stuart replied he would not be if Dixon stayed through the night, and Dixon agreed to do so. Not long after, Stuart was informed that during the afternoon, O'Sullivan had lodged an appeal to the Privy Council in London and Justice Reed had issued a 14-day stay; this appeal also failed, however.

== Royal Commission ==
By the time the Privy Council had rejected Stuart's appeal, Father Dixon had questioned the funfair workers, none of whom had appeared at the trial, and had returned with statements from Mr and Mrs Gieseman and one of the workers, Betty Hopes. Gieseman claimed that Stuart had left the funfair at 9:30 am, but had returned for lunch at 1:45 pm. He had then worked on the darts stall until 4 pm when he had left with Moir. Moir had then returned drunk at 11 pm, while Stuart had not returned until the following morning. Gieseman's wife confirmed this account. Hopes claimed she had worked with Stuart on the stall from 2 pm to 4 pm, and had given him 2 shillings (20c) to buy some chocolate for her when he told her he was going to the shop. News of the declarations resulted in a petition calling for the case to be re-opened. This in turn led to a petition demanding that the death sentence be carried out. The controversy forced Premier Thomas Playford IV to call a Royal Commission.

In August 1959 a Royal Commission, the Royal Commission in Regard to Rupert Max Stuart, was convened by the South Australian government. The Commission was appointed to enquire into matters raised in statutory declarations regarding Stuart's actions and intentions, his movements on 20 December 1958, and why the information in the declarations had not been raised in the Supreme Court or another authority before the declarations were made, and the circumstances in which the declarations were obtained and made. Before the commission, Stuart presented an alibi that his defence had never raised at the trial, that he had been working at the funfair when the crime was committed.

The detective who had questioned Alan Moir in Whyalla had given three different versions of what Moir had said in his statement. John Wentworth (Jack) Shand QC, counsel for Stuart, asked the detective which of the three versions was correct at which Justice Napier stated, He is not obliged to explain anything Mr Shand. Shand asked if he should stop the examination to which Napier replied, as far as I am concerned, I have heard enough of this. Shand withdrew from the case the next day claiming that the Commission was unable properly to consider the problems before it. Adelaide's daily newspaper, The News, covered the walkout with front-page headlines Shand Blasts Napier and These Commissioners Cannot Do The Job.

Of the 11 witnesses before The Commission, only three, including the taxi driver, had testified in the original trial. The three funfair workers claimed Stuart had been at the darts stand from 2 pm to 4 pm. Clement Chester claimed he had been at the funfair from 2 pm to 4 pm and had not seen Stuart. Ray Wells claimed he had been in Spry's store in Ceduna when he had overheard Stuart on the telephone ordering a taxi. Spry, the store owner, remembered Stuart waiting in the store for the taxi. Colin Ware claimed he had seen Stuart and Moir get into a taxi around 2 pm which had driven off in the direction of Thevenard. Taxi driver Bill Blackburn claimed he had picked up Stuart and Moir at 2 pm, and two Aboriginal girls, aged 15 and 16, claimed they had seen Stuart drinking on the verandah of the Thevenard Hotel at 2:30 pm. The Commissioners declared that the suggestion that police had intimidated Stuart into signing the confession was "quite unacceptable", and on 3 December 1959, the Commission concluded that Stuart's conviction was justified.
