= Kapunda Road Royal Commission =

South Australian royal commission

- Date: 5 May 2005 – 15 July 2005
- Duration: 2 months
- Location: South Australia, Australia
- Type: Royal commission
- Commissioner: Greg James
- Counsel assisting: Grant Niemann
- Outcome: Recommendations on police crash investigation and training, and the handling of expert evidence in criminal proceedings

The Kapunda Road Royal Commission was a royal commission created by the Government of South Australia in 2005 to inquire into the circumstances surrounding the hit and run death of Ian Humphrey and the circumstances around the trial and conviction of Eugene McGee. The Royal Commissioner was Greg James QC. The first hearing of the commission was on 12 May 2005 and the report was delivered on 15 July 2005.

== Background ==
Ian Humphrey was riding a bicycle on Kapunda Road, north of Adelaide, when he was struck by driver Eugene McGee, an Adelaide barrister and former police prosecutor, at 5:05 pm on 30 November 2003. McGee did not stop or render assistance.

=== Timeline ===
30 November 2003
12:30 pm: McGee arrives at the Wheatsheaf Hotel outside Gawler, 39 kilometres (24 mi) north of Adelaide, to have lunch with his brother Craig and mother Marjorie. The tables order docket shows three bottles of white wine, a glass of port and a glass of beer are purchased.
3:50 pm: Eugene and Craig McGee leave the hotel to take their mother home to Kapunda, 32 kilometres (20 mi) north of Gawler.
3:40 – 4:00 pm: Ian Humphrey leaves his home at Evanston Park to cycle to Freeling on the Kapunda/Gawler road.
4:30 – 4:50 pm: McGee leaves his mother's house to return to Adelaide.
4:50 pm: Occupants of a car travelling through Kapunda notice a dark blue/green 4WD travelling in the same direction which began overtaking them in a dangerous manner on the right. A passenger thinks the driver may have been drinking.
5:00 pm: Antoni Zisimou sees a green Mitsubishi Pajero driving erratically and swaying over the centre line at a speed of about 160 km/h (99 mph) in a 110 km/h (68 mph) zone.
5:05 pm: Ian Humphrey is struck and killed.
5:05 pm: A car is ahead of McGee travelling in the same direction. The driver sees the impact in his rear view mirror. His wife notes the registration number of McGee's vehicle and telephones police.
5:08 pm: Benjamin & Irene Voroniansky who are driving in the opposite direction stop and call an ambulance. They estimate the speed of the Mitsubishi Pajero leaving the scene to be 90–100 km/h (56–62 mph).
5:11 pm: McGee makes the first of three phone calls to his lawyer David Edwardson.
5:33 pm: Phones his wife Barbara.
5:37 pm: Phones his brother Craig.
5:42 pm: Phones his mother Marjorie.
5:50 pm: Phones his brother Craig. Police attend the home of Eugene McGee.
5:50 – 6:46 pm: McGee makes six phone calls to relatives.
6:49 pm: Craig McGee phones Eugene McGee.
6:50 pm: Police attend McGee's mother's house in Kapunda and speak to Craig McGee who informs police he has not spoken to or seen his brother and does not have his mobile phone number.
6:57 pm: Craig McGee phones McGee to inform him the police have been, are looking for him, and they know his car was involved in the accident.
7:24 pm: Sergeant Mills phones McGee's wife Barbara who tells him she hasn't heard from McGee and doesn't know his whereabouts.
7:30 pm: Diana Gilchrist arrives at accident scene while searching for her overdue husband Ian Humphrey.
7:30 pm: Craig McGee drives his brother back to Adelaide via the Kapunda/Gawler road. They are stopped at a police roadblock set up to find McGee but do not identify themselves.
7:40 pm: A reporter arrives at Marjorie McGee's house in Kapunda and finds McGee's car there.
8:50 pm: After being informed the car has been located, Police call at Marjorie McGee's house but find it locked up with no one home.
9:09 pm: Matthew Selley phones Sergeant Mills and states he is a solicitor representing Eugene McGee. Selley requests the "state of play" with regard to the collision. Mills asks for Selley's phone number so Sergeant Hassell can speak to him.
9:10 – 10:05 pm: Sergeant Hassell makes several phone calls to Selley to make arrangements to interview McGee.
10:05 pm: Police phone Selley who states McGee is willing to hand himself in the following morning.
10:10 pm: Police phone Selley who gives them an address in Norwood where they can speak to McGee.
11:30 pm: Police speak to McGee who reads from a prepared statement. McGee is arrested and taken to the City Watchhouse. Both Sergeant Hassell and Senior Constable Bell noted they could smell alcohol on McGee while he was in the police car.

=== Trial ===
Initially, the Office of the Director of Public Prosecutions was unable to find a prosecutor willing to prosecute McGee as he was very well known in the legal community and there were fears the case would never go to trial. The case eventually went to trial in May 2005 where McGee was acquitted of causing death by dangerous driving, but convicted of the lesser offences of driving without due care and failure to stop and render assistance following an accident. This was due to psychiatric evidence of McGee exhibiting Posttraumatic stress disorder symptoms following the accident. Sandy McFarlane from the University of Adelaide stated the PTSD was due to "horrific experiences" during McGee's former career as a police officer and in dealing with the evidence in the Snowtown trials as a solicitor for one of the murderers. McGee admitted he had not sought psychiatric or psychological treatment for the condition until 18 February 2004 (80 days after the incident) and no evidence of his erratic or dangerous driving prior to the accident was given at trial. He was fined $2,250 and was disqualified from holding a driver's licence for twelve months.

However, there was controversy over this conviction and the alleged reluctance of prosecutors to present evidence from Tony and John Zisimou who saw McGee's blue Pajero 4WD driving erratically at around 160 km/h (100 mph) approximately 1½ minutes before the accident (McGee's vehicle was actually green but television footage showed that at night, and under artificial lighting, it looked blue). Tony Zisimou's car was the third to stop at the scene and John, a nurse, declared the victim deceased and was credited for preserving the scene for police and preventing other witnesses from leaving before their arrival. There are also alleged anomalies concerning the behaviour of police in not breath testing McGee and the opportunity that major prosecution witness Tony Felice had to give evidence. Felice saw the accident in his mirror and his wife wrote the Pajero's plate number down as it continued down the road. At trial Sergeant Hassell gave evidence that while he knew he had the power to test for alcohol, they were short staffed and under pressure so it was not something he had considered at the time.

Groups supporting cyclists and victims of crime groups staged a number of protests against the decision of the court and the Government created the Royal Commission.

== Royal Commission ==
=== Terms of reference ===
1. Why the investigating police did not ask or require McGee to submit to a breath analysis test or blood test and did not apply for orders that such tests be conducted under the Criminal Law (Forensic Procedures) Act in order to determine McGee's blood alcohol concentration.
2. Whether the principal witness, Mr Tony Felice, was given a proper opportunity to give evidence about his observations of Mr McGee's driving immediately before the collision generally and on the defence case that McGee was attempting to overtake Mr Felice from a position about 25 to 30 metres (82–98 ft) to the rear of Felice's car.
3. Whether Mr Tony or Mr John Zisimou provided information to the police about the manner of McGee's driving prior to and following the collision.
4. Why the decision was made not to call Mr Tony or Mr John Zisimou or both at trial.
5. Whether it would have served the interests of justice for the prosecution to lead, at trial, evidence in rebuttal of the psychiatric evidence presented by the defence.
6. If the answer to the preceding question is yes why that evidence was not presented. In particular, was there an adequate opportunity for rebuttal evidence to be presented.
7. Whether it would have served the interests of justice for the prosecution to present expert psychiatric or other evidence on the sentencing hearing to support its submission that the Court should reject the explanation given at trial for Mr McGee's failure to stop and give assistance.
8. If the answer to the preceding question is "yes", why that evidence was not presented. In particular, was there an adequate opportunity to present that evidence.

=== Proceedings ===
Proceedings commenced on 12 May 2005. Evidence was heard from lawyers involved in the trial, respected psychiatrists, police officers, witnesses and members of the McGee family. Members of the public also made submissions. Craig McGee exercised his right not to answer questions on the grounds of self-incrimination. McGee was represented by SA Bar Association president Malcolm Blue QC. Blue was later appointed a Supreme Court judge.

Chris Tennant of Sydney University and another "very senior" professor of psychiatry were asked to review the psychiatric evidence and both concluded the evidence was not credible. Tennant stated; "I’ve never been more personally outraged about what I personally see as being a, in the common lingo, a mistrial, a travesty of the justice system."

Proceedings concluded on 1 July 2005 with the final report submitted on 15 July.

=== Recommendations ===
Retraining of police. More extensive pretrial disclosure of expert evidence. Courts permitted to appoint independent experts. The law be changed to allow police to be able to forcibly enter premises for searches. The penalty for death by dangerous driving to be increased to the same level as manslaughter. Increased penalties for fleeing an accident. Attempting to disguise blood alcohol levels should be an offence.

Commissioner James also produced a second closed (secret) report of recommendations for relevant agencies and ministers. It was the recommendations of this report that led to further charges being laid.

== Second trial ==
Charges of conspiring to pervert the course of justice and perverting the course of justice were laid against McGee and his brother Craig on 26 August 2005 over allegations they worked together to "frustrate, deflect or prevent" the police investigation into the hit and run in order to prevent police gaining "evidence of the blood-alcohol reading and sobriety of Eugene McGee". On 10 March 2006 the defense asked for a stay of proceedings and the case was adjourned to 9 November, after several further stays the defense asked for a permanent stay on 17 July 2007 arguing that the publicity would mean the brothers would be unable to gain a fair trial. The stay application was rejected on 14 February 2008, however, they could not stand trial until 2 February 2010 because their lawyer would be "unavailable" until that date. On 2 February, citing as a precedent an immigration case before the British House of Lords in 1972, the case was again delayed until 17 March. The House of Lords had found that after failing to attend a meeting there was no statutory obligation for an Indian immigrant to turn himself in as he had not been directed to do so by the immigration department, which McGee's lawyer claimed was "directly analogous" to the case of McGee. On 17 March, at a hearing that lasted less than a minute, District Court Judge Peter Herriman acquitted the McGees of the conspiracy charges finding that "There was no legal obligation then falling upon Eugene to surrender himself or upon either of them to assist police."

== Aftermath ==
McGee is still listed with the Law Society as a practising solicitor. Websites advertising his practice list McGee as a defence lawyer for charges of drunk driving, culpable driving and dangerous driving offences, which has caused anger in the community. Humphrey's widow Di Gilcrist stated, "He is actually profiting from the experience and the stigma that the case has afforded him...It is a sad reflection of the criminal justice system that something so black and white could be manipulated to absolve McGee of his lack of moral and ethical responsibility" Di Gilcrist subsequently complained to the legal board that McGee's actions [following the hit-run] amounted to professional misconduct.

In April 2011, a hearing before the Legal Practitioners Conduct Board found McGee was not guilty of "infamous conduct" and ruled he could continue to practise. The Conduct Board accepted that McGee was suffering from post-traumatic stress disorder and ruled that it could only consider his actions in the first few seconds after the crash and could not consider his telephone calls to family, his legal adviser or his actions to avoid police. Following the ruling, Senator Nick Xenophon said the outcome was a disgrace and the entire board should be sacked. Attorney-General John Rau stated he would review the Conduct Board's decision.

On 8 December 2011 Attorney-General John Rau closed the McGee case after Crown legal advice suggested the Conduct Board's decision could not be challenged. Opposition justice spokesman Stephen Wade said Rau could overturn the Board's ruling not to ban Mr McGee from practising and challenged him to release the Crown's legal advice. Senator Xenophon told the media; "Show us the advice, otherwise his opinion and his decision not to act lacks credibility... Only by releasing the legal advice will the Attorney-General show he has a genuine commitment to justice in the McGee case".

On 6 February 2012, McGee apologised on national television for the 2003 hit and run when he appeared in a two-part television special on the case on ABC's Australian Story. Humphrey's family claimed they had been denied justice and that McGee had never apologised to them face-to-face. McGee replied that an apology had been offered through his solicitor years before which had been rejected and it had not been repeated out of respect for the family's privacy. McGee stated: "Can I take this opportunity to extend my sympathy to the family for their loss. I'm sorry for what occurred and to apologise to them for my reaction to the accident."

Following the Attorney-General's refusal to release the legal advice supporting his decision not to overturn the Board's ruling, on 18 February 2012, Senator Xenophon made a plea for the public to contact their MPs demanding that Attorney-General Rau take action.

In October 2013, the South Australian Parliament amended the Legal Practitioners Act 1981 (SA) to replace the existing categories of "unsatisfactory conduct" and "unprofessional conduct", with the categories of "unsatisfactory professional conduct" and "professional misconduct". The changes to the definitions were designed to prevent a repeat of the Legal Practitioners Conduct Board's hearing that found McGee not guilty.
