= Child Protection Systems Royal Commission =

Royal commission in South Australia

- Date: 15 August 2014 – 5 August 2016
- Duration: 1 year, 11 months
- Location: South Australia, Australia
- Also known as: Nyland Royal Commission
- Type: Royal commission
- Outcome: 260 recommendations; Department for Child Protection established
- Commissioner: Margaret Nyland
- Counsel assisting: Emily Telfer
- Final report: The Life They Deserve

The Child Protection Systems Royal Commission, also known as the Nyland Royal Commission, was a South Australian royal commission, established by the government of South Australia in 2014 to review the state's child protection system. This commission was convened following the arrest of Families SA residential care worker Shannon McCoole in relation to allegations of sexual abuse of children in care. On 15 August 2014, Governor Kevin Scarce appointed retired Supreme Court Justice Margaret Nyland as commissioner through letters patent. Emily Telfer was the counsel assisting.

The investigation covered the existing child protection legislation and policies of South Australia, as well as how Families SA responds to reports of child abuse and protects children in out-of-home care. The final report, entitled The Life They Deserve, was presented by Nyland to Governor Hieu Van Le on 5 August 2016. The report contained 260 recommendations and revealed that a traditional focus on individual cases along with a lack of investment in recent years had hampered the system's capacity to deal with difficult cases.

In line with an interim recommendation, an standalone Department for Child Protection was established on 1 November 2016. In their response document, A Fresh Start, the government adopted 196 recommendations and adopted in principle 60 more. By 2026, the department reported 251 recommendations as having been implemented and five more as currently being put into effect by the department. The remaining four had been rejected by the government.

== Background ==
On 21 May 2014, the South Australian Legislative Council set up the select committee on Statutory Child Protection and Care in South Australia. The first terms of reference of this committee were to review how Families SA went about recruiting and training foster carers, as well as the information foster carers were provided on the children allocated to them.

In June 2014, Families SA residential care worker Shannon Grant McCoole was arrested. On 22 July, following a revelation by police that a Families SA worker had been charged with offenses against seven preschool-age children in residential care, Premier Jay Weatherill stated that he expected that a royal commission would be required.

The Child Protection Systems Royal Commission, also known as the Nyland Royal Commission, was commissioned on 15 August 2014. In the commissioner's final report, the McCoole case was recognised as the immediate catalyst for the investigation and added that the community's concerns regarding Families SA and the child protection system preceded this arrest.

There was an overlap between the invitation by the select committee and the work of the commission. The commission stated that some individuals had incorrectly assumed that when they made a submission to the committee, they would also be submitting their material to the commission.

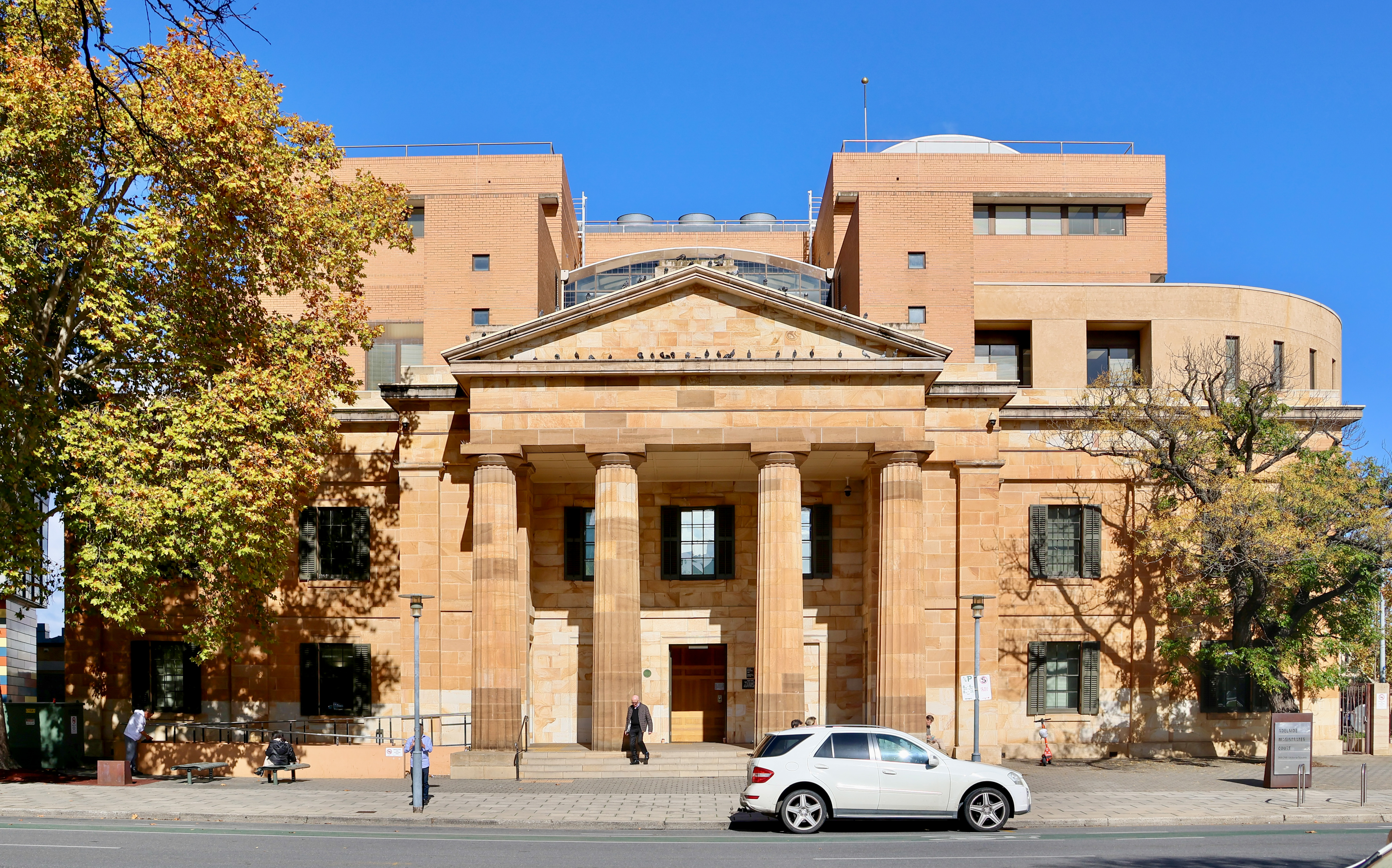
Adelaide Magistrates Court building, viewed from Victoria Square in May 2026

In December 2014, McCoole pleaded guilty to 18 charges in the Adelaide Magistrates Court, which included sexual offences against minors who were in his care and production of child exploitation material. The suppression order imposed on him was lifted at that time.

== Terms of reference ==
Premier Weatherill issued the terms of reference on 15 August 2014. The letters patent instructed the commission to inquire into the adequacy of the state's laws and policies in relation to child protection issues and the performance of Families SA, other government departments and non-government organisations offering services on licenses issued by the minister.

Inquiry was required on the methods used for receiving reports and assessing risks, the criteria for removal of the children from their family, and ensuring that children were safe while placed in both short-term and long-term placements. It would also look into the personnel issues, including the staffing and resourcing of the organisations, screening, training and supervision of the staff and volunteers, and any complaints alleging abuse or neglect of children in care.

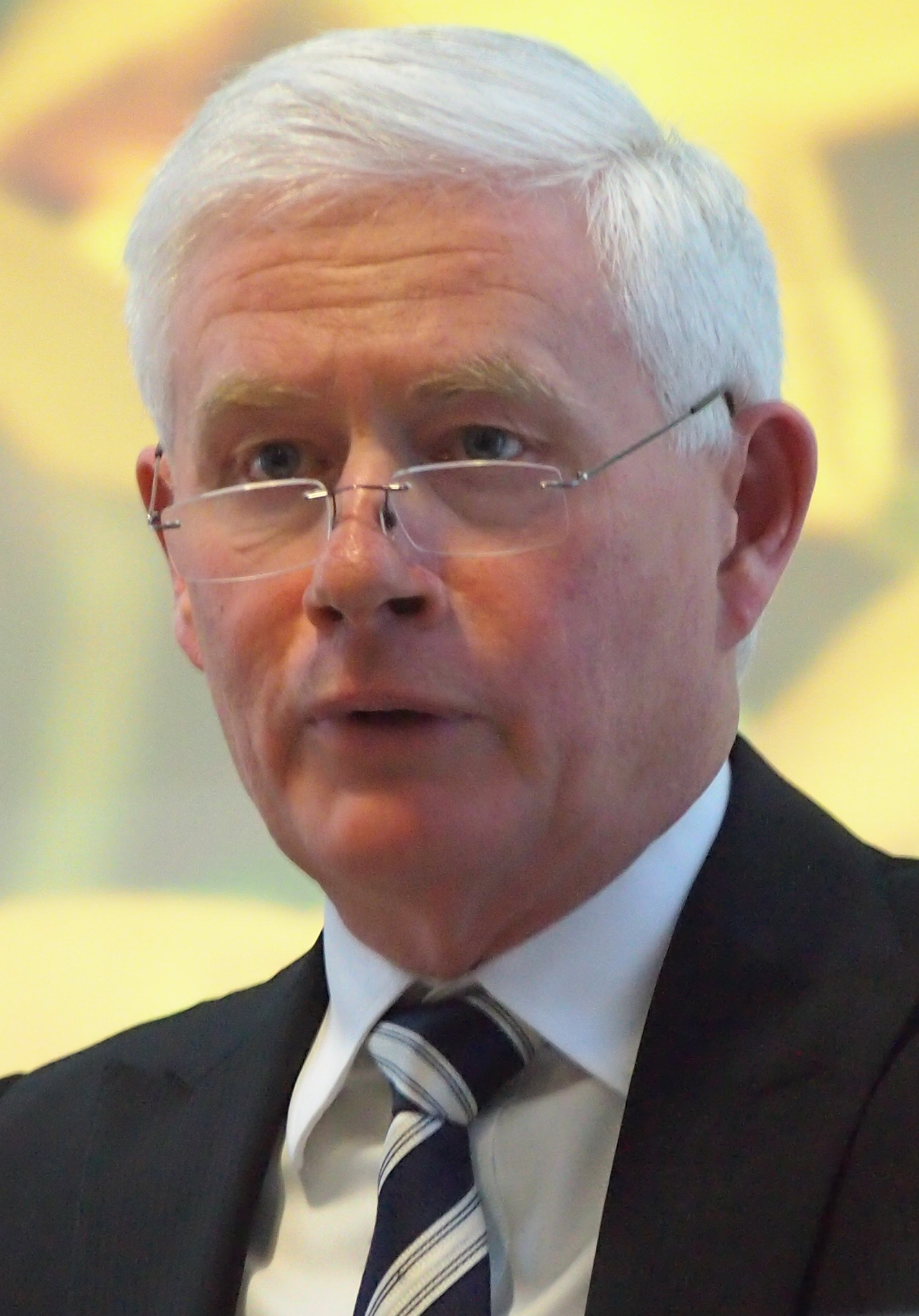
Rau in 2015

At the time of her appointment, Attorney-General John Rau, stated that the government has redrafted the terms of reference after reviewing the submissions and wanted the inquiry to be concerned with the well-being of children in the child protection system. He stated that Nyland would be able to bring up issues in relation to government departments as they arise and that work on reforms could start even before the final report could be made. The commission needed to ensure that no prejudice was done to any criminal investigation pending at that time. Simon Schrapel, CEO of the Uniting Communities, welcomed the appointment of Nyland and wanted the terms of reference to stress more on abuse prevention, especially in relation to indigenous children.

Initially, the commission had one year within which to present its report. Instruments issued on 16 July 2015 and 11 February 2016 extended this deadline to 5 August 2016.

== Commissioner and executive ==
Margaret Nyland, who was once a judge of the Supreme Court of South Australia, was named royal commissioner under the Royal Commissions Act 1917 on 15 August 2014 by Governor Kevin Scarce. Premier Weatherill named Nyland for her experience in child protection cases and her work at the Supreme, District, and Youth Courts.

Emily Telfer assisted the commission as counsel from October 2014 until August 2016, with the help of Melissa Wilkinson. Angel Williams, who was the director of the commission office, managed the administration, finance, and staffing of the commission. The expert advisory panel consisted of medical doctor Diana Hetzel, social worker Di Gursansky and psychologist Rosemary Kennedy.

== Submissions ==
The commission accepted written submissions online and by mail via a public notice issued on 1 November 2014.

In its January 2015 submission, the Guardian for Children and Young People drew on the experiences of children and young people in state care. The Guardian advised that intensive family support be increased to help keep children in or return them to their families and suggested amendments to the Children's Protection Act 1993 allowing more influence for children in decisions about themselves. The submission also advocated for independent monitoring of out-of-home care, the reduction in size of large institutions to houses accommodating no more than four children, and the requirement of the state to provide services to young people leaving care up until the age of 24.

Uniting Communities advocated for increasing family support services to keep children with their immediate or extended families whenever feasible. Local decision-making was favoured, increased community participation in dealing with child protection issues, defined roles of government departments and increased participation of community organisations in service provision were also some of the suggestions. Each child or young person was to be given an advocate at case conferences and other such forums, and a Children's Commissioner needed to be appointed.

The process of receiving the submissions ended in the last week of January 2015. The submissions received by the commission included 374 written submissions, many confidential ones and selected non-confidential ones published on its website. These submissions played a major role in the formulation of its general hearing program.

== Public hearings ==
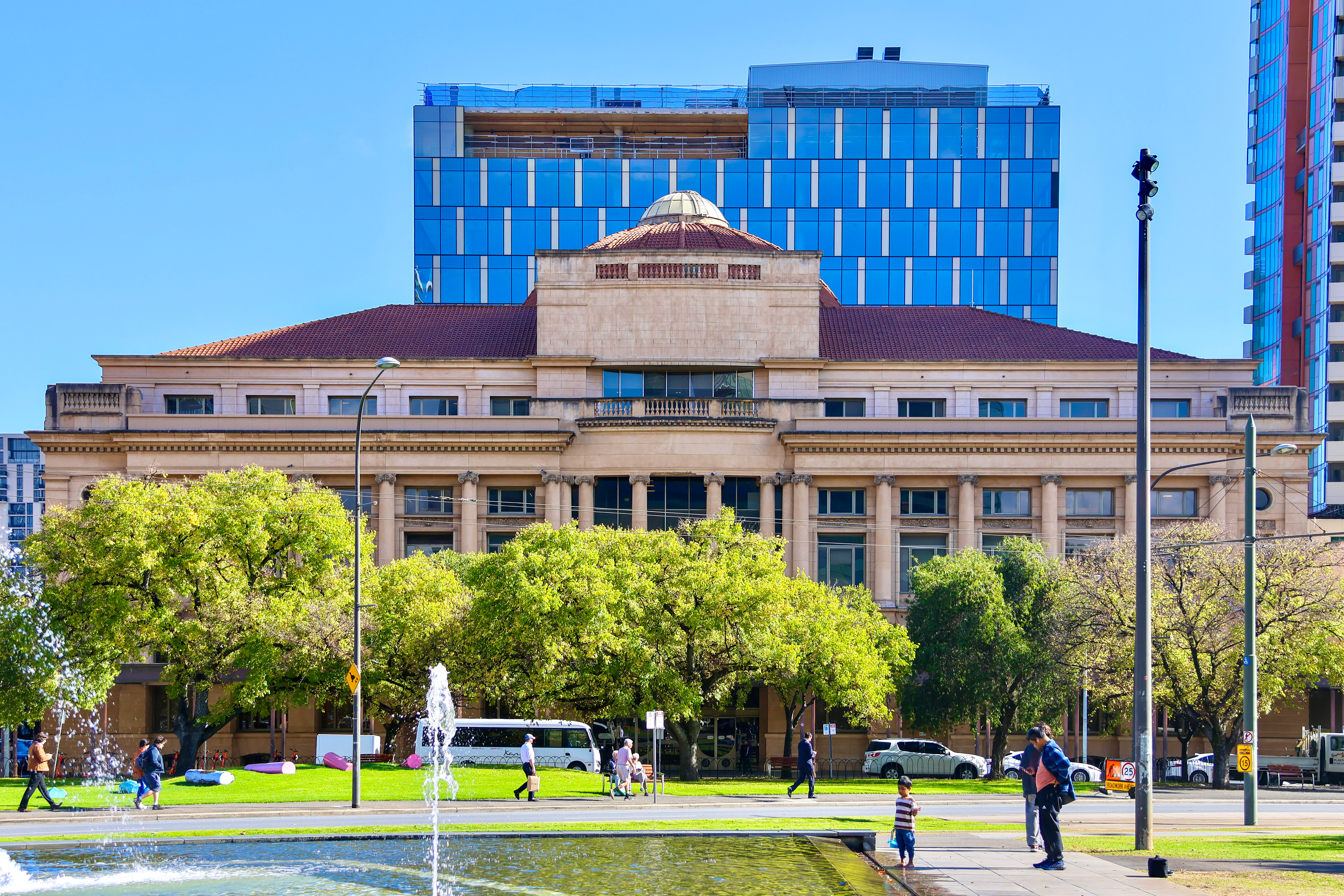
Sir Samuel Way Building in Adelaide, one of the commission's hearing venues

The commission had its first formal hearing on 5 November 2014 and released the opening statement by counsel assisting. The hearing started again in February 2015. The commission took evidence in Adelaide, Mount Gambier, and Port Augusta, and also took evidence through video link from witnesses in APY Lands, Northern Territory and New South Wales. Witnesses giving sworn evidence included Families SA staff, children in care, care leavers and foster and kinship carers.

On 26 February 2016, Shannon McCoole, former residential care worker at Families SA, provided evidence for about five hours. McCoole stated to the commission that he had completed basic training before working for Families SA, and that most of the guidelines he had seen at Families SA were related to children above the age of 12. It was further reported to the commission that McCoole returned to his job after suspension, following a report from a colleague about alleged abuse.

In all, 381 witnesses testified before the commission.

== Reports ==
In interim recommendations on 20 June 2016, the commission recommended the removal of Families SA from the Department for Education and Child Development, appointment of a new chief executive, and reduction in the levels of management in the department. Nyland indicated that the reforms called for changes in the leadership and culture of the agency.

On 5 August 2016, Nyland submitted her final report titled The Life They Deserve to Governor Hieu Van Le. Nyland made a total of 260 recommendations focused on prevention and early intervention measures. Nyland identified that the system's focus on individual incidents was inadequate for addressing complex cases of abuse and neglect. She also stated that years of under-funding limited the system's capacity to tackle cases of sexual abuse of children in the care of the organisation. She identified a number of workplace failures in the agency that left children in residential care exposed to sexual abuse from Shannon McCoole.

The recommendations included better response times for the Child Abuse Report Line, stopping single-person shifts on residential care duties, improving training and supervision of workers, and a children's commissioner. The commission also recommended that each child or youth in care should be assigned a worker who met with them individually each month.

== Outcomes ==
=== Government response ===
Weatherill in July 2016

On 21 June 2016, the South Australian Government made an announcement stating that they have accepted the interim recommendation of the commission to relocate Families SA from the Department for Education and Child Development to a new standalone Department for Child Protection (DCP). The Premier Weatherill stated that the previous attempt of relocation to the Department of Education and Child Development did not lead to positive results.

After the submission of the final report, Premier Weatherill offered his public apology to those children that McCoole has abused and to their families. Child Protection Reform Minister Rau also stated that some members of staff involved in that case were suspended.

The DCP was established on 1 November 2016 according to the Public Sector Act 2009 with 1,750 staff relocated from the Department of Education and Child Development. Its functions consisted of addressing cases of abuse and providing help to children that could not stay with their family.

The government issued its official response A Fresh Start on 29 November 2016. The government had accepted 196 of the recommendations, accepted in principle a further 60 and rejected only four recommendations. The government committed A$432 million for changes to child protection system, including the initial A$200 million pledged in August. The response included a deadline of 30 June 2017 for the implementation update and further annual reports to be submitted until 30 June 2022.

=== Implementation and oversight ===
Implementation of child protection reform was undertaken by the Child Protection Reform Implementation Team from 3 January 2017 to coordinate the work between government and non-government organisations and report on progress. It included the establishment of the Early Intervention Research Directorate, pilot testing of the Child Safety Pathway as a multi-agency intake approach, and increased funding for the services to transition-aged care leavers.

Helen Connolly started working as the Commissioner for Children and Young People in South Australia on 18 April 2017 following a selection process involving children and young people. The new independent statutory office was set up by the Children and Young People (Oversight and Advocacy Bodies) Act 2016 to implement the recommendation of the royal commission. Functions of the office include advocacy for the rights and interests of children and young people, their participation in decision-making about themselves, and ministerial and public authority advice.

As at 30 June 2017, it was reported that the department had completed 36 of the 256 recommendations that were accepted either fully or in principle. For 63, the work was being done, 85 were still in planning, and 72 had not yet begun to be addressed. The Legislative Council select committee, which had its mandate extended to examine how the government responded to the recommendations of the royal commission and other past inquiries, presented its report on 28 November 2017.

The initial phase of the Children and Young People (Safety) Act 2017 became effective as at 26 February 2018. This Act incorporated some of the recommendations of the commission, like the greater participation of children in decision-making and improved family group conferences. According to the DCP, the Act would have given more say in decision-making to the carers while investing in early intervention within families.

=== Later assessments ===
In her 2022 analysis of the child protection system in the state, Kate Alexander noted that the commission's objective to minimise the demand on the statutory child protection service through referrals to early intervention services had not been met.

According to the DCP's 2026 report, out of the 260 recommendations made by the commission, 251 had been completed, five were under implementation while four had been rejected. These five recommendations included responses to all notifications that exceeded the threshold for action; ending closure of cases due to lack of resources; provision of supported accommodation for young people leaving care; reporting of performance against specified alternative-care standards on a quarterly basis; and providing sustained funding for playgroups in remote Aboriginal communities.

== See also ==
- Protecting Victoria's Vulnerable Children Inquiry
- Royal Commission into the Protection and Detention of Children in the Northern Territory
- Forde Inquiry
