= Australian Early Development Census =

National census of developmental outcomes in children

The Australian Early Development Census (AEDC) is a nationwide data collection that measures the development of children at the time they start their first year of full-time school in Australia. Conducted every three years since 2009, the AEDC provides population-level data on children's health, wellbeing, language and learning across various developmental domains. The AEDC data is used to inform early childhood policy, planning and research.

== Background ==
First introduced in 2009, the AEDC is conducted every three years across all states and territories of Australia, covering around 300,000 children in each collection cycle. The results are used by government, policymakers, educators, and health professionals to support evidence informed decision-making in the development of programs and policies.

The AEDC measures children's development across five developmental domains:

- physical health and wellbeing,
- social competence,
- emotional maturity,
- language and cognitive skills (school-based),
- and communication and general knowledge.

By collecting data on these domains, the AEDC provides a national snapshot of the developmental progress of Australian children at school entry, highlighting patterns over time and variation between population groups and/or postcodes. It is used to specifically identify where additional support may be needed.

The AEDC is a collaborative effort between the Australian Government and state and territory governments, and is administered by the Australian Department of Education.

== Triennial report findings ==
- 2009 – First national AEDC established baseline measures of early childhood development. It showed the majority of children doing well on each of the five developmental domains. About 50.7% of children were developmentally on track on all five domains and 23.6% were developmentally vulnerable on one or more domains at school entry.
- 2012 – Second national cycle reported modest national improvement compared with 2009, with an increase in the proportion of children developmentally on track and a small reduction in developmental vulnerability.
- 2015 – Third national report found that national developmental outcomes were largely stable over time, with earlier gains in the proportion of children on track being maintained across most domains.
- 2018 – Fourth AEDC cycle reported further modest national improvements on the key summary indicators, with the proportion of children on track across all five domains reaching its highest level at that point in time.
- 2021 – Fifth national report indicated stability in overall results with a slight decrease in the percentage of children on track across all domains and persistent demographic and geographic inequalities.
- 2024 – Sixth AEDC national report found that the percentage of children on track on all five domains decreased to 52.9% (from 54.8% in 2021) however, results remain above the 2009 baseline (50.7%). Developmental vulnerability increased to 23.5% on at least one domain and 12.5% on two or more domains, the highest levels recorded since the AEDC began.

== Development ==
The AEDC was developed by the Australian Department of Education, in collaboration with the Centre for Community Child Health at the Royal Children's Hospital in Melbourne. Dr. Sally Brinkman played a key role in the development and implementation of the Australian Early Development Index (AEDI) first piloted in 2004, which was then adapted in the way data was collected and reported to become the Australian Early Development Census (AEDC) in 2009.

One of the key features of the AEDC is that the data is made publicly available for communities to use. This means that educators, health professionals, researchers, and community organizations can access and use AEDC data to inform their work and better understand the needs of children in their communities.
