= Sally Brinkman =

Australian social epidemiologist

Professor Sally Brinkman
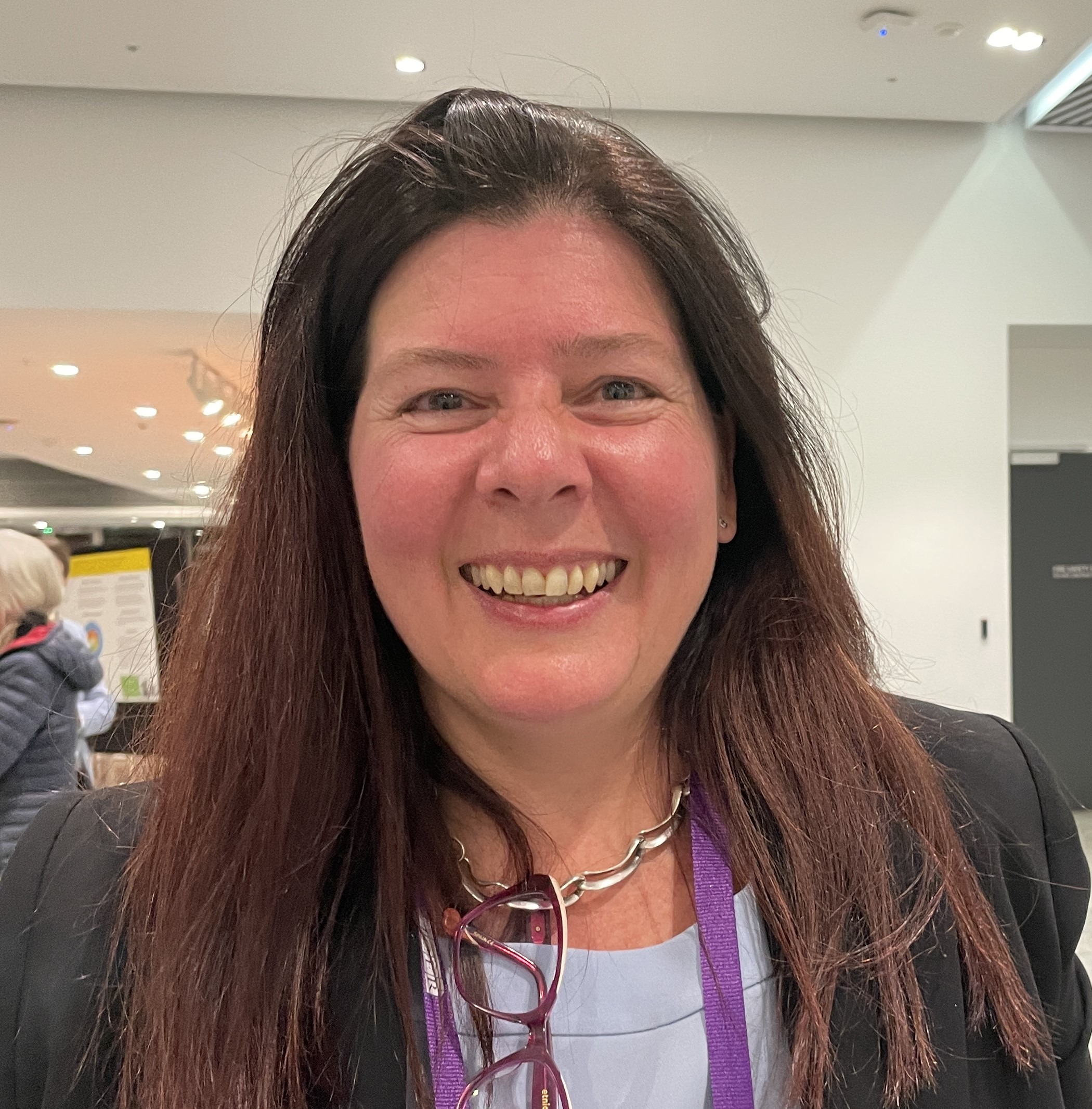
- Brinkman in 2023
- Education: Flinders University (1994), University of Adelaide, University of Western Australia (PhD) (2012)
- Occupation: Epidemiologist
- Known for: research and implementation of the Australian Early Development Index, The Early Human Capability Index ehci-info.com
- Scientific career
- Fields: Epidemiology, population health
- Workplaces: Adelaide University
- Thesis: The validation and use of a population measure of early childhood development in Australia: the Australian Early development Index (2012)
- Doctoral advisor: Cate Taylor, Fiona Stanley, Steve Zubrick
- Website: researchers.adelaide.edu.au/profile/sally.brinkman

Sally Brinkman is an Australian social epidemiologist with a focus on early childhood development and the impact of society on children's short and long term outcomes. Brinkman led the development and implementation of the Early Development Instrument (EDI) for population level data across Australia, now known as the nationwide Australian Early Development Census (AEDC) measuring over 300,000 children in how they have developed by the time they start their first year of full-time school. Brinkman works for international organizations including World Bank, UNICEF and AusAID, and has over 200 publications covering child development and education. Brinkman is a professor at Adelaide University and the co-director of the Fraser Mustard Centre, an initiative to improve research translation established between Adelaide University and the South Australian Department for Education.

== Awards ==
In 2018, Brinkman received a National Health and Medical Research Council (NHMRC) Research Excellence Award as Australia's top ranked applicant in the Career Development Fellowships: Population Health – Level 1 category.
