= Laurence O'Loughlin =

Australian politician

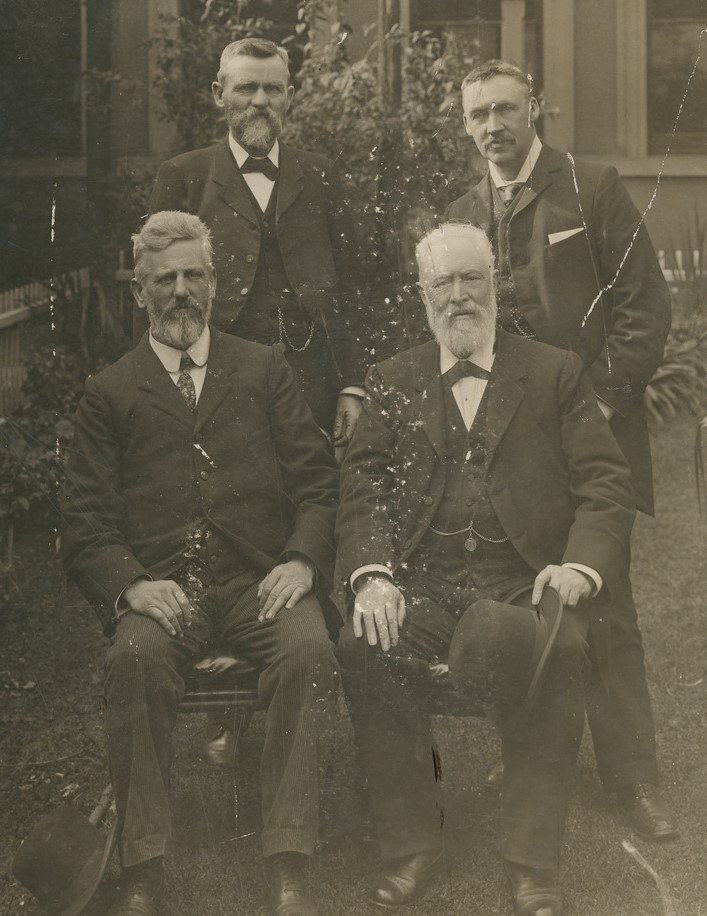
Price Ministry, c. 1905

Laurence Theodore O'Loughlin (21 February 1854 – 25 January 1927) was an Australian politician who represented the South Australian House of Assembly seats of Frome from 1890 to 1902 and Burra Burra from 1902 to 1918. He represented the Liberal Union from 1910 to 1918, when he defected to the Farmers and Settlers Association. He served as Speaker of the South Australian House of Assembly from 1912 to 1915. 1854–1927

He was the member of parliament for Frome district from 1890 to 1892. From 1892 to 1918 he was member for Burra Burra He held the Commissioner of Crown Lands for three governments 28 Sept 1896 – 1 December 1899 8 December 1899 – 31 March 1902 26 July 1905 – 5 June 1909 He was government Whip from 1902 to 1904. He retired from politics in 1918 and died 25 January 1927 in Pinnaroo, South Australia.

== See also ==
- Laurence, South Australia

Political offices
Preceded by Thomas Price	Commissioner of Public Works; 1909 – 1910	Succeeded by John Verran
South Australian House of Assembly
Preceded by Harry Jackson	Speaker of the South Australian House of Assembly; 1912–1915	Succeeded by Frederick Coneybeer
