= Josiah Boothby =

Josiah Boothby CMG (1837–1916) was a public administrator in the colony of South Australia.

Boothby was the fifth son of the Benjamin Boothby (who later became a judge in the Supreme Court of South Australia), and was born at Nottingham on 8 April 1837. He went to the colony with his father in 1853, and in that year became Clerk in the Colonial Secretary's Office, Clerk in the Audit Office in 1854, Chief Clerk in the Audit Office in 1856, Chief Clerk in the Chief Secretary's Office in 1859, also Government statist and Superintendent of Census in 1860, Assistant Secretary and Government Statist in 1866, and Under Secretary and Government Statist in 1868. He was elected Corresponding Member of the Statistical Society, London, in 1869; was appointed Trustee of the Savings Bank, South Australia, in 1869; a Commissioner for International Exhibitions in 1872; joint editor of a work "South Australia: its History, Resources, and Productions," published by authority of Government in 1876, and Executive Commissioner representing South Australia at the Paris Universal Exhibition in 1878, in connection with which he was created C.M.G., and received the Cross of the Legion of Honour. Owing to a dispute in connection with the expenses of the Paris Exhibition he retired from the public service of South Australia in 1880.
