= John Bagot (1849–1910) =

Australian businessman and politician

John Bagot J.P. (10 January 1849 – 29 August 1910) was a businessman and politician in the colony of South Australia.

== History ==
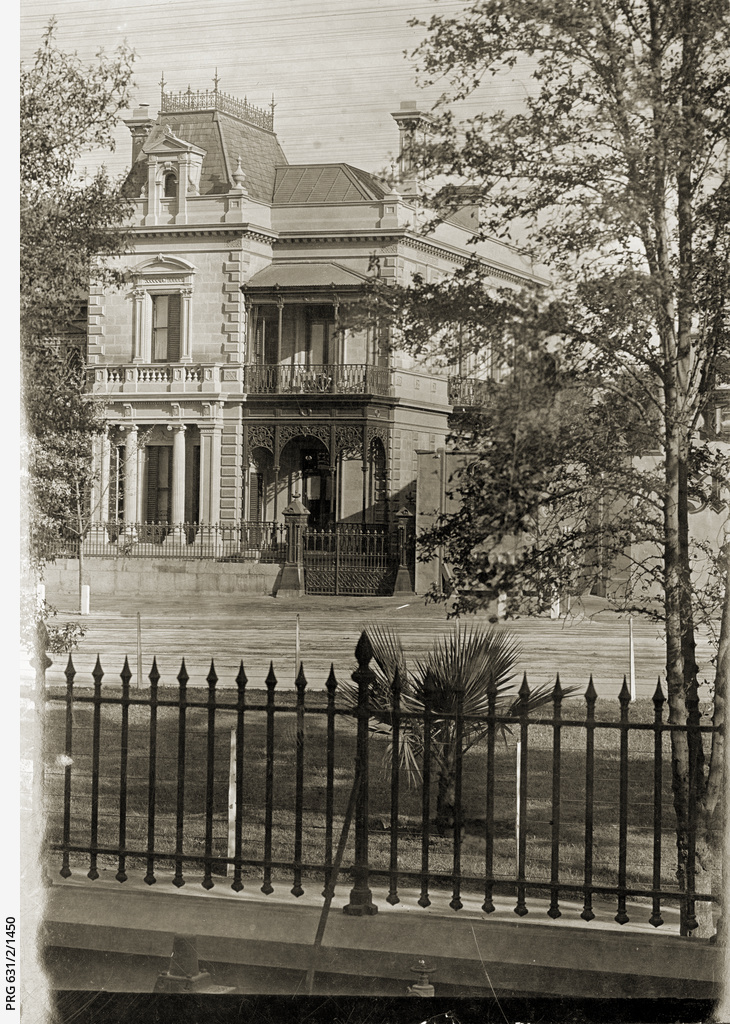
Bagot's Italianate private residence on North Terrace, circa 1907

Bagot was born the second son of Christopher Michael Bagot (1817 – 8 November 1853) and Margaret Elizabeth Bagot, née Watts (c. 1823 – 6 November 1910) at his father's property "Koonunga", near Kapunda, South Australia. His mother was a daughter of Capt. John Watts (of the 73rd Regiment), who was at one time Adelaide's Postmaster-General. His grandfather, who selected the property, was Capt. Charles Hervey Bagot, of the 59th Regiment, who arrived in South Australia on the Birman in December 1840. It was on this same property that copper was discovered by Captain Bagot's youngest son Charles Samuel Bagot, which incorporated with the F. S. Dutton's adjoining property "Anlaby", became Australia's first copper mine.

Bagot was educated at St. Peter's College, then for several years worked for the National Bank of Australasia. In the 1870s he and his brother C. M. Bagot (1852–1899) took up the Peake cattle run, between Warrina and Lake Eyre, which they continued to run until around 1900. He also owned the "Springbank" property near Burra for a few years. For a long period he was a director of Bagot, Shakes, & Lewis, Limited, Broken Hill Pty., the National Bank, the South Australian Brewing Company, the Alliance Assurance Company, and the South Australian Mining Association.

He represented the seat of Victoria in the South Australian House of Assembly from April 1884 to April 1887.

He married Lucy Josephine Ayers (c. 1857 – 11 May 1945), a daughter of Sir Henry Ayers, on 24 September 1878. Walter Hervey Bagot (17 March 1880 – 27 February 1889), a noted architect, and founding partner in Woods and Bagot was the only child to survive to adulthood. They lived at Buxton Street, North Adelaide, later Park Terrace, Fitzroy until 1901, then "Forest Lodge", 19 Pine Street, Stirling, where John established a fine garden. His library included a valuable collection of Australiana. For several years prior to his death Mr. Bagot was an invalid, and was obliged to retire altogether from public life, living on Pennington Terrace, North Adelaide, where he died.

== Recognition ==
His widow endowed a prize for botany at the University of Adelaide in his name from 1912.

== Family ==
Charles Hervey Bagot "Captain Bagot" (c. 17 April 1788 – 29 July 1880) married Mary MacCarthy ( – 17 January 1860) around 1815. They emigrated on the Birman, arriving in South Australia in December 1840. He was a member of the Legislative Council for a number of terms between 1844 and 1869. Among their descendants were:

- Christopher Michael Bagot (1817 – 8 November 1853) married Margaret Elizabeth Watts (c. 1823 – 6 November 1910) on 6 August 1846. Margaret was the eldest daughter of John Cliffe Watts.

- Charles Hervey Bagot C.B. (18 May 1847 – 8 November 1911) married Laura Mildred Daniel ( – 15 August 1879) on 22 July 1874
- John Bagot J.P. (10 January 1849 – 29 August 1910) married Lucy Josephine Ayers (c. 1857 – 11 May 1945), daughter of Sir Henry on 24 September 1878.

- Walter Hervey Bagot (17 March 1880 – 27 February 1889), noted architect, founding partner in Woods and Bagot
- Henry Charles Hervey Bagot (25 January 1886 – 27 February 1889)

- Mary Jane Bagot (23 July 1850 – 2 November 1901) married George Mathieson Turnbull (c. 1840 – 29 November 1885) on 12 December 1868. Died at "Leith House" Barton Terrace.

- George Bagot Turnbull (7 May 1876 – 1 December 1911) married Elsie Stewart Patterson.

- Don Turnbull (28 May 1909 – 30 January 1994) was a prominent tennis player and squash champion.

- Christopher Michael Bagot Jr. (15 June 1852 – 8 October 1899) married Eleanor Mary Hawker (1855 – 11 January 1939) on 1 February 1878. Their ten children included:

- Arthur Gerald Bagot (26 April 1888 – 12 November 1979), naval officer

- Margaret Elizabeth Bagot Jr. (3 May 1854 – 10 August 1929).

- Mary Elizabeth Bagot (c. 1822 – 20 January 1892) married William Jacob (c. 1815 – 14 July 1902) on 31 August 1842. William was a draftsman with Col. William Light Jacobs Creek is named for their family.
- Edward Meade "Ned" Bagot (13 December 1822 – 24 July 1886) married Mary Pettman (1830 – 5 March 1855) on 1 August 1853. He married again, to Anne Smith, née Walworth ( – 16 February 1892), on 30 July 1857.

- Allan Walter Bagot (24 March 1874 – )

- Charlotte Owen Bagot (1824 – 22 October 1893) married Captain William H. Maturin C.B. (1814–1889) on 2 October 1845
- Sir Charles Samuel Bagot (1828 – 21 July 1906) married Lucy Francisca Hornby on 29 July 1851 in Lancaster, England

See also

For a more complete chart of Bagot family members, refer to Charles Hervey Bagot
