= James Hesketh Biggs =

Australian painter

Colonel James Hesketh Biggs was a 19th-century painter, photographer and engraver in South Australia who was active in the 1860s and 1870s. He was renowned in his day and won numerous awards, but most of his work is now lost.

== See also ==
- Visual arts of Australia
