= Electoral results for the district of Barossa =

South Australian district election results

This is a list of election results for the electoral district of Barossa in South Australian elections.

== Members for Barossa ==
Two members (1857–1901)
Member	Party	Term	Member	Party	Term
Walter Duffield		1857–1868	Horace Dean		1857–1857
Walter Duffield		1857–1868	William Bakewell		1857–1860
Walter Duffield		1857–1868	Edward Grundy		1860–1862
Walter Duffield		1857–1868	Joseph Barritt		1862–1864
Walter Duffield		1857–1868	John Williams		1864–1865
Walter Duffield		1857–1868	James Martin		1865–1868
Richard Baker		1868–1871	Philip Santo		1868–1870
Richard Baker		1868–1871	Walter Duffield		1870–1871
John Howard Angas		1871–1876	J. A. T. Lake		1871–1875
John Howard Angas		1871–1876	Johann Sudholz		1875–1875
John Howard Angas		1871–1876	John Dunn Jr.		1875–1878
Martin Basedow		1876–1890	John Dunn Jr.		1875–1878
Martin Basedow		1876–1890	John Downer		1878–1891
James Hague		1890–1891	John Downer		1878–1891
James Hague	Defence League	1891–1896	John Downer	Defence League	1891–1896
James Hague		1896–1902	John Downer	National League	1896–1901
James Hague		1896–1902	Ephraim Coombe	Labor	1901–1902

Three members (1902–1938)
Member	Party	Term	Member	Party	Term	Member	Party	Term
Richard Butler		1902–1904	Ephraim Coombe		1902–1906	William Gilbert	National League	1902–1906
Richard Butler	Farmers and Producers	1904–1910	Ephraim Coombe		1902–1906	William Gilbert	National League	1902–1906
Richard Butler	Farmers and Producers	1904–1910	Ephraim Coombe	Liberal and Democratic	1906–1910	Samuel Rudall	Liberal and Democratic	1906–1910
Richard Butler	Liberal Union	1910–1923	Ephraim Coombe	Independent	1910–1912	Samuel Rudall	Liberal Union	1910–1915
Richard Butler	Liberal Union	1910–1923	William Hague	Liberal Union	1912–1923	Samuel Rudall	Liberal Union	1910–1915
Richard Butler	Liberal Union	1910–1923	William Hague	Liberal Union	1912–1923	Ephraim Coombe	Labor	1915–1917
Richard Butler	Liberal Union	1910–1923	William Hague	Liberal Union	1912–1923	Henry Crosby	Liberal Union	1917–1924
Richard Butler	Liberal Federation	1923–1924	William Hague	Liberal Federation	1923–1924	Henry Crosby	Liberal Federation	1923–1924
George Cooke	Labor	1924–1931	William Hague	Liberal Federation	1923–1924	Leonard Hopkins	Labor	1924–1927
George Cooke	Labor	1924–1931	Henry Crosby	Liberal Federation	1924–1930	Leonard Hopkins	Labor	1924–1927
George Cooke	Labor	1924–1931	Henry Crosby	Liberal Federation	1924–1930	Herbert Basedow	Independent	1927–1930
George Cooke	Labor	1924–1931	Thomas Edwards	Labor	1930–1931	Leonard Hopkins	Labor	1930–1931
George Cooke	Parliamentary Labor	1931–1933	Thomas Edwards	Parliamentary Labor	1931–1933	Leonard Hopkins	Parliamentary Labor	1931–1933
Herbert Lyons	Liberal and Country	1933–1938	Henry Crosby	Liberal and Country	1933–1938	Herbert Basedow	Independent	1933–1933
Herbert Lyons	Liberal and Country	1933–1938	Henry Crosby	Liberal and Country	1933–1938	Reginald Rudall	Liberal and Country	1933–1938

Second incarnation (1956–1970)
Member	Party	Term
Condor Laucke	Liberal and Country	1956–1965
Molly Byrne	Labor	1965–1970

== Election results ==
=== Elections in the 1960s ===
1968 South Australian state election: Barossa
Party	Candidate	Votes	%	±%
Labor	Molly Byrne	8,792	52.5	+1.0
Liberal and Country	Roger Goldsworthy	7,608	45.4	−0.8
Democratic Labor	Bernard McRae	216	1.3	+0.4
Independent	Luke Horan	138	0.8	+0.8
Total formal votes		16,754	98.1	−0.5
Informal votes		331	1.9	+0.5
Turnout		17,085	95.1	−0.5
Two-party-preferred result
Labor	Molly Byrne	8,893	53.1	+0.8
Liberal and Country	Roger Goldsworthy	7,861	46.9	−0.8
Labor hold		Swing	+0.8	

1965 South Australian state election: Barossa
Party	Candidate	Votes	%	±%
Labor	Molly Byrne	6,015	51.5	+51.5
Liberal and Country	Condor Laucke	5,405	46.2	−39.7
Social Credit	David Wood	165	1.4	+1.4
Democratic Labor	Andrew Shore	104	0.9	+0.9
Total formal votes		11,689	98.6	+5.7
Informal votes		170	1.4	−5.7
Turnout		11,859	95.6	+1.2
Two-party-preferred result
Labor	Molly Byrne	6,113	52.3	+52.3
Liberal and Country	Condor Laucke	5,576	47.7	−38.2
Labor gain from Liberal and Country		Swing	N/A	

1962 South Australian state election: Barossa
Party	Candidate	Votes	%	±%
Liberal and Country	Condor Laucke	6,172	85.9	−14.1
Communist	Fred Slater	1,011	14.1	+14.1
Total formal votes		7,183	92.9	
Informal votes		549	7.1	
Turnout		7,732	94.4	
Liberal and Country hold		Swing		

=== Elections in the 1950s ===
1959 South Australian state election: Barossa
Party	Candidate	Votes	%	±%
Liberal and Country	Condor Laucke	unopposed		
Liberal and Country hold		Swing		
