= Members of the South Australian House of Assembly, 1924–1927 =

This is a list of members of the South Australian House of Assembly from 1924 to 1927, as elected at the 1924 state election:

Name	Party	Electorate	Term of office
Peter Allen ^{[4]}	Liberal	Yorke Peninsula	1902–1912, 1915–1925
Ernest Anthoney	Liberal	Sturt	1921–1938
Sir Henry Barwell ^{[5]}	Liberal	Stanley	1915–1925
Frederick Birrell	Labor	North Adelaide	1921–1933
Alfred Blackwell	Labor	West Torrens	1918–1938
Richard Layton Butler	Liberal	Wooroora	1915–1918, 1921–1938
Thomas Butterfield	Labor	Newcastle	1915–1917, 1918–1933
Hon Frederick Coneybeer	Liberal	East Torrens	1893–1921, 1924–1930
Clement Collins	Labor	Murray	1924–1933
Frank Condon	Labor	Port Adelaide	1924–1927
George Cooke	Labor	Barossa	1924–1933
Henry Crosby ^{[1]}	Liberal	Barossa	1917–1924, 1924–1930, 1933–1938
Bill Denny	Labor	Adelaide	1900–1905, 1906–1933
Bert Edwards	Labor	Adelaide	1917–1931
John Fitzgerald	Labor	Port Pirie	1918–1936
Herbert George ^{[6]}	Labor	Adelaide	1926–1933, 1947–1950
Edward Giles ^{[4]}	Liberal	Yorke Peninsula	1926–1933
John Gunn ^{[6]}	Labor	Adelaide	1915–1917, 1918–1926
William Hague ^{[1]}	Liberal	Barossa	1912–1924
Walter Hamilton ^{[3]}	Liberal	East Torrens	1917–1924, 1925–1930, 1933–1938
William Harvey	Labor	Newcastle	1918–1933
Albert Hawke	Labor	Burra Burra	1924–1927
Percy Heggaton	Liberal	Alexandra	1906–1915, 1923–1938
Lionel Hill	Labor	Port Pirie	1915–1917, 1918–1933
Leonard Hopkins	Labor	Barossa	1924–1927, 1930–1933
Herbert Hudd	Liberal	Alexandra	1912–1915, 1920–1938, 1941–1948
Leslie Claude Hunkin	Labor	East Torrens	1915–1917, 1921–1927
Harry Kneebone ^{[3]}	Labor	East Torrens	1924–1925
George Laffer	Liberal	Alexandra	1913–1933
John Lyons ^{[5]}	Liberal	Stanley	1926–1948
Sydney McHugh	Labor	Burra Burra	1924–1927, 1930–1933, 1941–1944
John McInnes	Labor	West Torrens	1918–1950
Malcolm McIntosh	Country	Albert	1921–1959
James McLachlan	Liberal	Wooroora	1918–1930
Frederick McMillan	Country	Albert	1921–1933
James Moseley	Liberal	Flinders	1910–1933
Robert Nicholls	Liberal	Stanley	1915–1956
John O'Connor	Labor	Flinders	1924–1927
Mick O'Halloran	Labor	Burra Burra	1918–1921, 1924–1927, 1938–1960
John Pedler	Labor	Wallaroo	1918–1938
John Price ^{[2]}	Labor	Port Adelaide	1915–1925
Peter Reidy	Liberal	Victoria	1915–1932
Herbert Richards	Liberal	Sturt	1921–1930
Robert Richards	Labor	Wallaroo	1918–1949
Allan Robertson	Labor	Wooroora	1918–1921, 1924–1927
Eric Shepherd	Labor	Victoria	1924–1933
Frank Staniford	Labor	Murray	1924–1927, 1930–1933
Henry Tossell	Liberal	Yorke Peninsula	1915–1930
John Stanley Verran ^{[2]}	Labor	Port Adelaide	1918–1924, 1925–1927
Stanley Whitford	Labor	North Adelaide	1921–1927
Edward Vardon	Liberal	Sturt	1918–1921, 1924–1930
Harry Dove Young	Liberal	Murray	1912–1927

^{1} Barossa Liberal MHA William Hague died on 9 October 1924. Liberal candidate Henry Crosby won the resulting by-election on 22 November.
^{2} Port Adelaide Labor MHA John Price resigned on 21 April 1925. Labor candidate John Stanley Verran won the resulting by-election on 20 June.
^{3} East Torrens Labor MHA Harry Kneebone resigned on 30 September 1925 to contest the 1925 federal election. Liberal candidate Walter Hamilton won the resulting by-election on 28 November.
^{4} Yorke Peninsula Liberal MHA Peter Allen died on 22 October 1925. Liberal candidate Edward Giles won the resulting by-election on 20 January 1926.
^{5} Stanley Liberal MHA Sir Henry Barwell resigned on 17 December 1925. Liberal candidate John Lyons won the resulting by-election on 16 March 1926.
^{6} Adelaide Labor MHA John Gunn resigned on 28 August 1926. Labor candidate Herbert George won the resulting by-election on 21 September.
