= Henry Crosby =

Australian politician

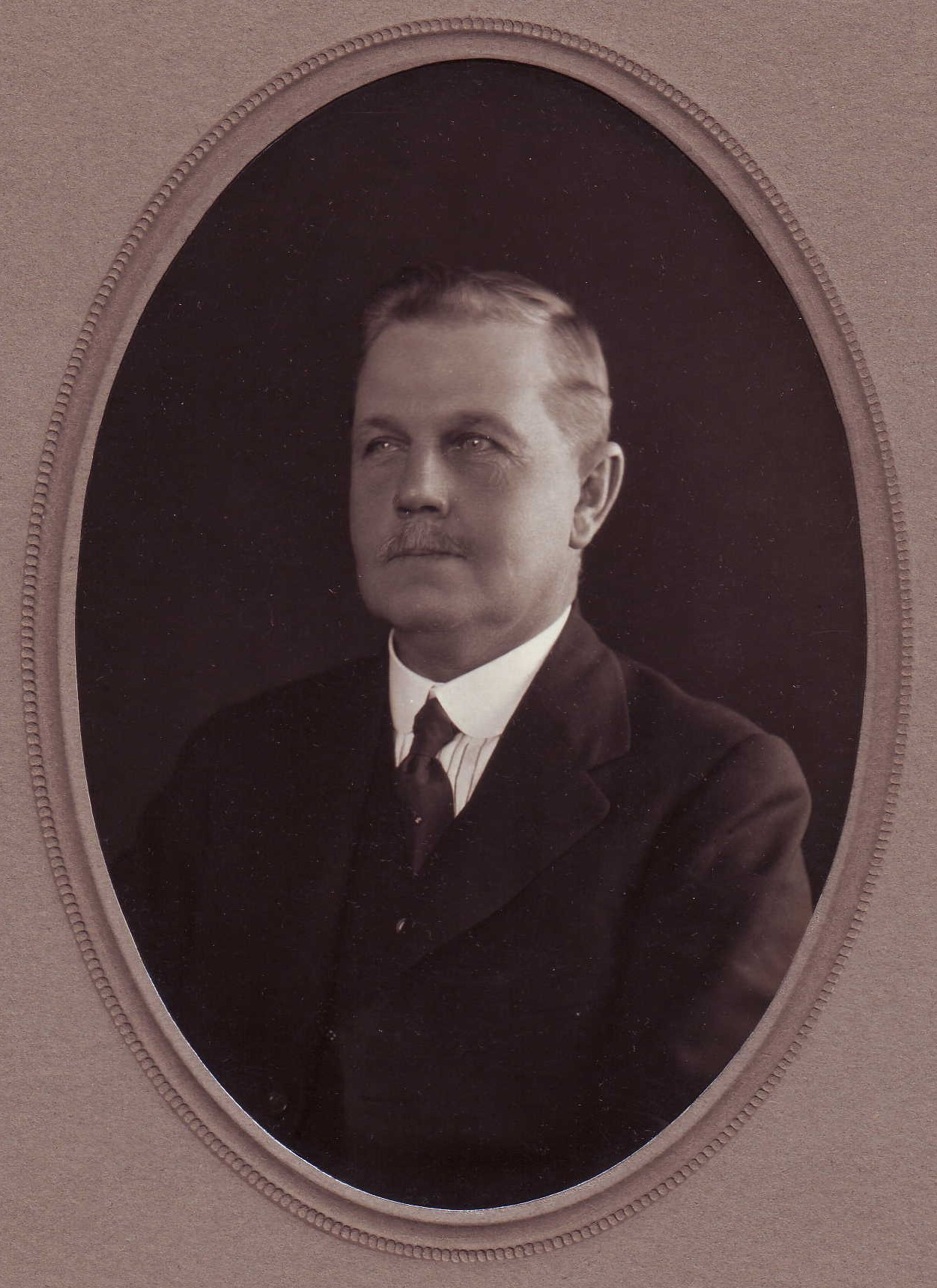

Member for Barossa
- In office 2 June 1917 – 4 April 1924 Serving with William Hague, Richard Butler
- Preceded by: E. H. Coombe
- Succeeded by: Leonard Hopkins
- In office 22 November 1924 – 4 April 1930 Serving with George Cooke, Leonard Hopkins, Herbert Basedow
- Preceded by: William Hague
- Succeeded by: Thomas Edwards
- In office 8 April 1933 – 18 March 1938 Serving with Herbert Lyons, Herbert Basedow, Reginald Rudall
- Preceded by: Thomas Edwards

Personal details
- Born: Henry Burgess Crosby; 9 March 1870
- Died: 24 June 1949 (aged 79)
- Party: Liberal and Country
- Other political affiliations: Liberal Federation, Liberal Union

Henry Burgess Crosby (9 March 1870 – 24 June 1949) was an Australian politician who represented the South Australian House of Assembly multi-member seat of Barossa from 1917 to 1924, 1924 to 1930 and 1933 to 1938 for the Liberal Union, Liberal Federation and Liberal and Country League.

Crosby failed to be re-elected at the 1924 election held on 5 April. He returned to parliament later in the year as the result of the by-election held on 22 November following the death of William Hague.
