= Richard Butler (Australian politician) =

Australian politician (1850–1925)

The Honourable Sir Richard Butler
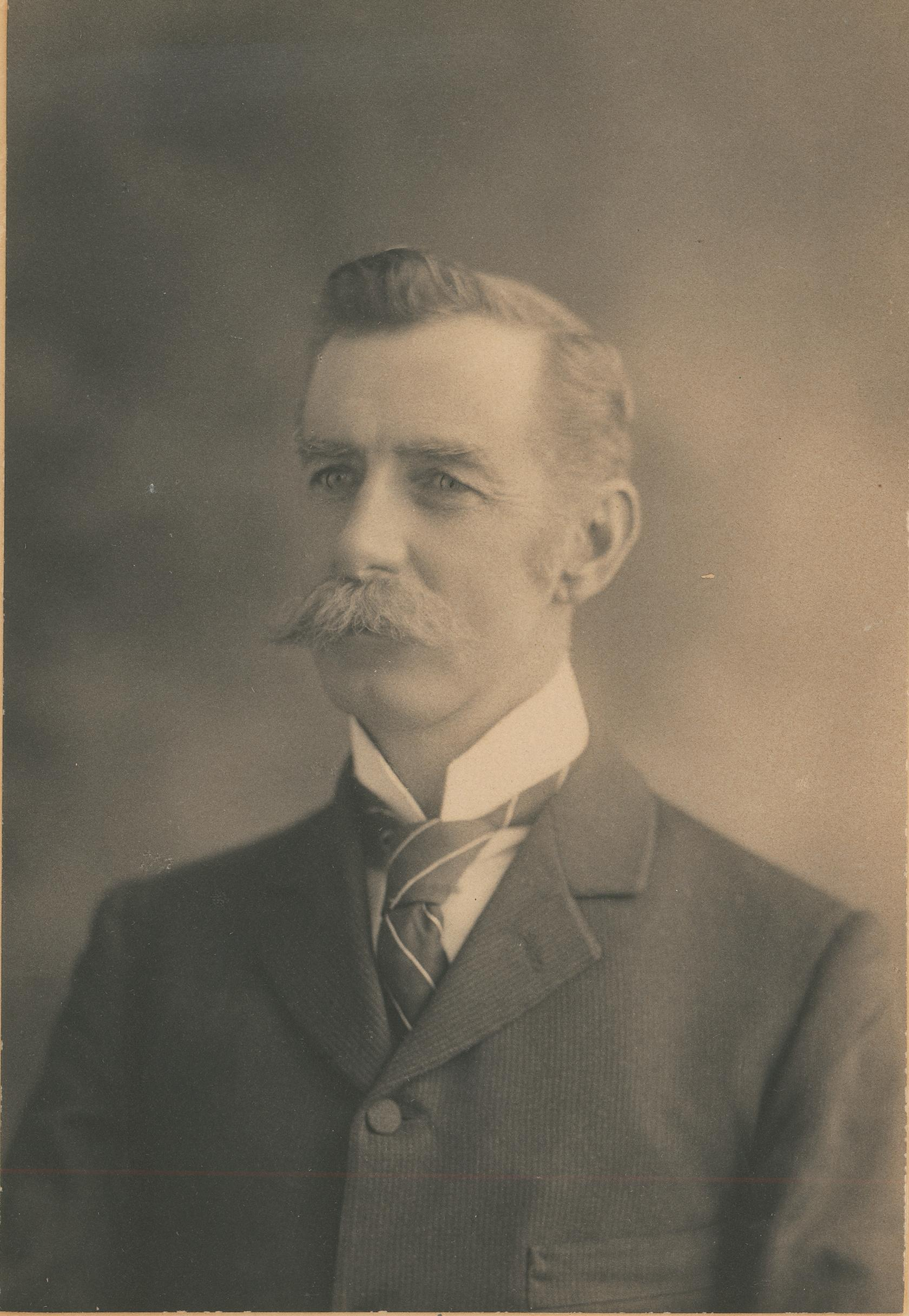

23rd Premier of South Australia
- In office 1 March 1905 – 26 July 1905
- Monarch: Edward VII
- Governor: Sir George Le Hunte
- Preceded by: John Jenkins
- Succeeded by: Thomas Price

13th Leader of the Opposition (SA)
- In office 1905–1909
- Preceded by: Thomas Price
- Succeeded by: John Verran

Personal details
- Born: 3 December 1850 Stadhampton, England, UK
- Died: 28 April 1925 (aged 74) South Croydon, England, UK
- Party: Conservative

Sir Richard Butler (3 December 1850 – 28 April 1925) was an Australian politician. He was a member of the South Australian House of Assembly from 1890 to 1924, representing Yatala (1890–1902) and Barossa (1902–1924). He served as Premier of South Australia from March to July 1905 and Leader of the Opposition from 1905 to 1909. Butler would also variously serve as Speaker of the House of Assembly (1921–1924), and as a minister under Premiers Charles Kingston, John Jenkins and Archibald Peake. His son, Richard Layton Butler, went on to serve as Premier from 1927 to 1930 and 1933 to 1938.

== Early life ==
Richard Butler was born at Stadhampton, near Oxford, England, to Richard Butler, père and his wife Mary Eliza, née Sadler. He had a younger sister, Mary. Richard and Mary Eliza emigrated with their two children Mary and Richard to South Australia, arriving in Adelaide on 8 March 1854, following Richard père's brother Philip, who emigrated fourteen years earlier, made a fortune as a pastoralist and landowner, established Mallala sheep station, and built a two-storey homestead on his property Yattalunga station (also spelled "Yatalunga"), near Gawler, then returned to England in December 1857. Richard père took over management of "Mallala" and "Yattalunga", where the growing family (see below) lived until around 1870. (Note: The new owners of Yattalunga were Joseph Barritt (1816–1881), who purchased the station in 1878, and his son Frank Barritt (1863–1918).)

Butler attended St Peter's College, Adelaide. He was a Justice of the Peace before he was 30.

== Political career ==
Butler represented Barossa from 3 May 1902 to 4 April 1924.

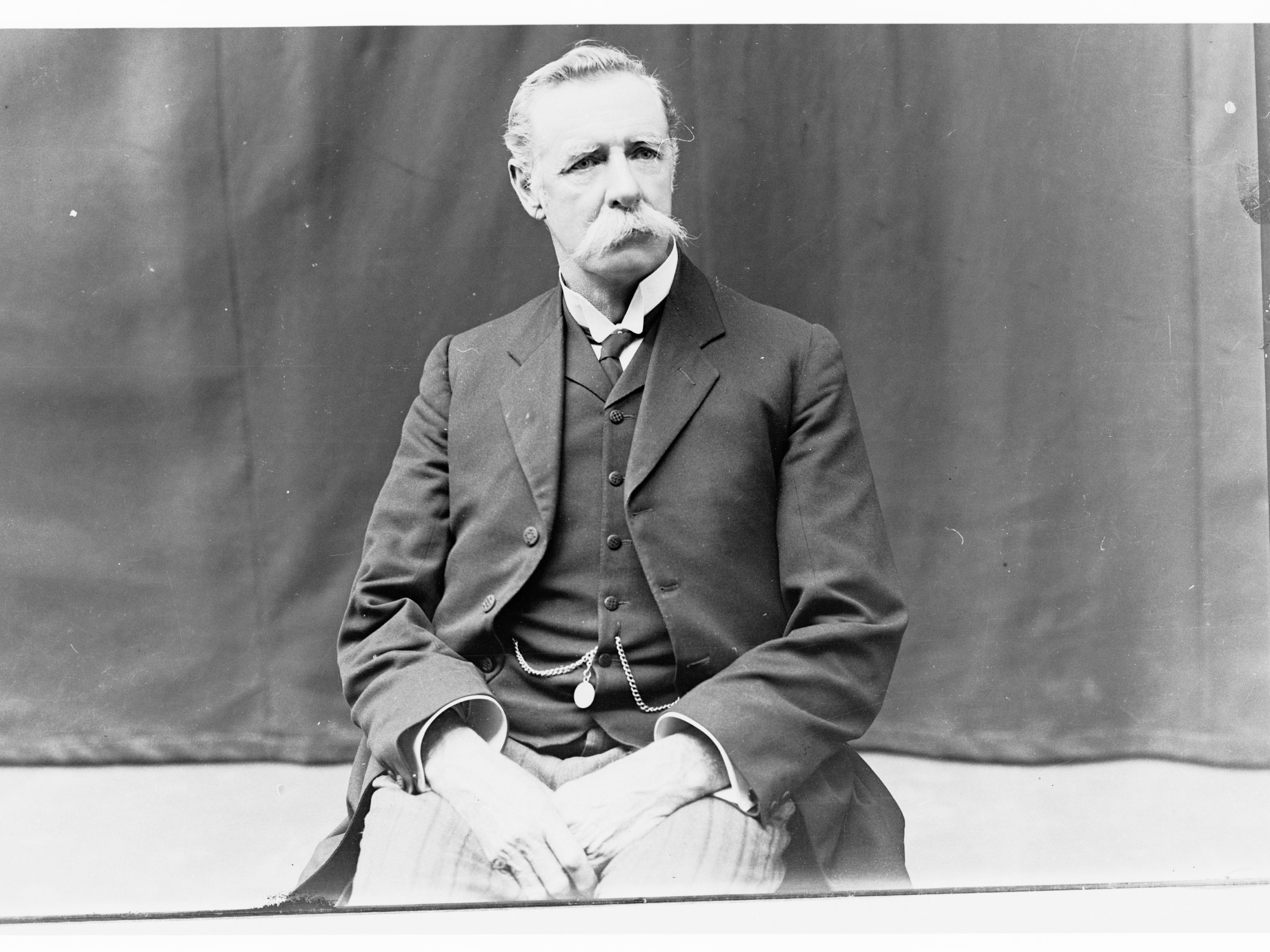
Portrait of Sir Richard Butler, Member of Peake Ministry, c. 1905

Butler was treasurer in the Jenkins ministry from 15 May 1901 to 1 March 1905, and was also Commissioner of Crown Lands and Immigration from 1 April 1902 to 1 March 1905. In June 1902 he implemented a number of cost-cutting amalgamations in the public service, notably in the agriculture and lands departments.

His ministry was defeated soon after the 1905 election where Labor formed government under Thomas Price and retained government at the 1906 election, relegating Butler to opposition until a year before the 1910 election, when Labor lost government resulting from Price's death. The Liberal and Democratic Union (LDU) insisted on taking the premiership. On 22 December 1909 Butler joined the first Peake LDU ministry as Treasurer and Minister for the Northern Territory, but the ministry was defeated following the 1910 election. Following the 1912 election, Butler was Commissioner of Public Works in the second Peake ministry from 17 February 1912 to 10 November 1914 and Minister of Mines and of Marine from 17 February 1912 to 3 April 1915. The Peake government was defeated at the 1915 election, however Labor split over conscription in 1917 which brought down the government. Butler was Treasurer once again and Minister of Railways in Peake's third ministry from 14 July 1917 to 7 May 1919, and Minister of Agriculture 19 December 1918 to 7 May 1919.

== Late life ==
Butler died at South Croydon on 28 April 1925. Butler was made a knight bachelor in 1913. He had married Helena Kate Layton in 1878 and Ethel Pauline Finer in 1894. He had eight children by his first marriage and three by his second.

Butler's son, Richard Layton Butler, was twice premier of South Australia (1927–30 and 1933–38). His great-great-grandson Mark Butler is a Labor member of the Australian House of Representatives.

== Family ==
=== Richard Butler ===
Richard Butler (c. 1812 – 9 June 1887) married Mary Eliza Sadler (c. 1822 – 18 June 1898), arrived in South Australia March 1854

- Mary Butler (c. 1849 – 13 August 1899) married Rev. John Garlick Pitcher (1842 – 27 September 1900) on 16 August 1877. He previously married Elizabeth Charlotte Catherine Smyth-Blood (c. 1849 – 20 July 1870) on 7 November 1867. Their family included:

- John Blood Pitcher (1870–1949) accountant, auditor for Thebarton Town Council
- Richard Charles Pitcher (1878 – 18 May 1919) actor, elocutionist, headmaster in South Africa.
- Margaret Mary Pitcher (1880– )
- Alice Catherine Pitcher (1884– )
- Cyril Frederick Pitcher MD (1887–1955)
- May Eleanor Gertrude Pitcher (1889– )
- Ronald Oswine (later Oswin) Pitcher (1892–1971) chairman of Municipal Tramways Trust 1944–

- Sir Richard Butler (3 December 1850 – 28 April 1925) married Helena Kate Layton ( – 17 April 1893) on 2 January 1878; they had eight children; he married again to Ethel Pauline Finey (1864 – 16 July 1952) on 7 June 1894; they had three more children.

- Col. Charles Philip Butler (16 July 1880 – 25 September 1953) agricultural editor for The Advertiser
- Helen Margaret Butler (16 May 1882 – ) married Rev John Stoward Moyes in 1909. He became Archdeacon of Adelaide and Bishop of Armidale

- Helena Margaret Moyes (1910– )
- Guy Stoward Moyes (1915–2004)
- Peter Morton Moyes (1917– )
- Philip Richard Moyes (1918– )
- Monica Mary Moyes (1924– )

- second daughter Mary Acres Butler ( – 13 June 1974) married Rev. Herbert Ramsden Cavalier (1877–1965) on 13 January 1915
- Sir Richard Layton Butler (31 March 1885 – 21 January 1966) married Maude Isabel Draper (23 July 1883 – ) on 4 January 1908

- Mary Helen "Mollie" Butler (1908–1993) married Capt. John Neil McEwin (14 July 1907 – 1993) on 19 August 1931. Capt. McEwin was a great-grandson of George McEwin (1815–1885).
- Jean Kate Butler (20 September 1909 – ) married Ian Eversley Thomas (1902–1970) in 1937
- Richard Charles Layton Butler (30 March 1917 – 1987) married Patricia Marie Tardrew (1920–1998) on 5 June 1944

- Guy Theodore Butler (7 February 1888 – 23 July 1948) married Gladys Seymour Keay ( – 26 January 1941) on 11 January 1917
- third daughter Dorothy Kate "Dolly" Butler (27 July 1889 – 1964) married lawyer Charles Mortimer Muirhead (1857 – 23 September 1938) on c. 1 May 1913. He was the father of Henry Mortimer Muirhead (see below)
- Kathleen Sarah Agnes "Kate" Butler (28 October 1891 – 1968) married Henry Mortimer Muirhead (31 July 1885 – 2 September 1951) on 29 December 1923
- Ruth Ethel Muriel Butler (20 January 1897 – c. September 1976 in Terrigal, NSW) married Lieut. Cyril William Goodman (30 December 1893 – 1978) on 28 April 1917. He was a son of Sir William Goodman (1872–1961), managing director and chief engineer of the Municipal Tramways Trust.

- Kate Lisette "Katie" Butler (1855 – 17 July 1929) married Frederick Taylor Whitington (13 June 1853 – 30 November 1938) on 1 October 1878
- (Jane) Agnes Butler (1857 – 17 January 1943) was a nurse, lived at 58 Anglesea Street, Hobart
- Helen Margaret "Nellie" Butler (1860 – 23 September 1949) lived with her widowed mother at Brighton, died at home of nephew Cyril Pitcher, 59 Dutton Terrace, Medindie.
- Henry Herbert "Harry" Butler (1861 – 8 February 1939) married Lillie Muriel Rudall (1866 – 14 July 1954) on 7 April 1885. He was town clerk of Strathalbyn; contested seat of Murray 1920
- Daniel Frederick "Dan" Butler (1864 – 25 August 1928) married Susan Maude/Maud Angus ( – 1949) in 1904

=== Philip Butler ===
Richard's brother Philip Butler (c. 1822–1899) arrived on vessel John in February 1840 and was associated with A. W. Thorold Grant. (Note: Alexander William Thorold Grant-Thorold, of Congrove Hall ( – 1 February 1908), was High Sheriff of Lincolnshire in 1850, and married Anna Hamilton Stirling (1840– ), third daughter of Admiral Sir James Stirling, on 23 July 1863. His brother Frederick Augustus Grant (c. 1830–1921) was a successful pastoralist; his son William Thorold Grant wrote as "Bendleby" for The Australasian on the pastoral industry, and was father of Dr. Richard Longford Thorold Grant (1894–1979) of Adelaide.) in running sheep on a large property in the Hundred of Munno Para and at Mudla Wirra; leased "Mallala" inc. Gawler; married Matilda Roe on 13 September 1849. He built a large two-storey house on his property "Yattalunga" (frequently "Yatalunga"), later occupied by his brother Richard. Philip and his family returned to England, where Matilda died on 12 April 1862. He married again to Margaret Chesshyre on 2 July 1863, returned to South Australia briefly then retired to England. Their children were:

- Matilda Mary Butler (born 30 July 1850; died young)
- Edith Lucille Butler (8 March 1852 – ) married Prof. Charles Henry Pearson on 10 December 1872.
- Alice Isabel Butler (23 December 1853 – )
- Millicent Lecette Butler (10 August 1855 – )
- Charles Philip Roe Butler (15 April 1857 – )

He had three further children in England: a son on 15 February 1859 and twins in November 1862.

== See also ==
- Hundred of Butler

== Notes and references ==
Political offices
Preceded by John Jenkins	Premier of South Australia; 1905	Succeeded by Thomas Price
Preceded by Thomas Price	Leader of the Opposition of South Australia; 1905–1909	Succeeded by John Verran
Preceded by John Verran	Commissioner of Public Works; 1912 – 1914	Succeeded by George Ritchie
South Australian House of Assembly
Preceded by James Cowan	Member for Yatala; 1890–1902; Served alongside: William Gilbert	District abolished
Preceded by James Hague	Member for Barossa; 1902–1924; Served alongside: Coombe, Crosby, Gilbert, Hague, Rudall	Succeeded by George Cooke
Preceded by Frederick Coneybeer	Speaker of the House of Assembly; 1921–1924	Succeeded by John McInnes
