= William Hague (Australian politician) =

Australian politician

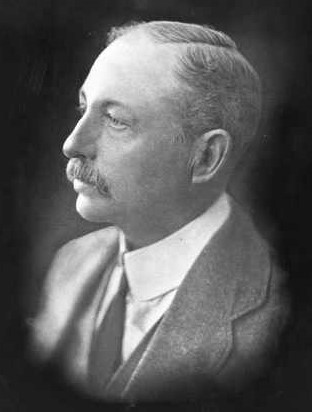
- William Hague, circa 1925

Commissioner of Public Works
- In office 1920–1922
- Preceded by: George Ritchie
- Succeeded by: Thomas Pascoe

Treasurer of South Australia
- In office 3 November 1922 – 16 April 1924
- Premier: Henry Barwell
- Preceded by: George Ritchie
- Succeeded by: John Gunn

Member for Electoral district of Barossa
- In office 1912–1924 Serving with: Richard Butler; Samuel Rudall; E. H. Coombe; Henry Crosby; Leonard Hopkins; George Cooke
- Preceded by: E. H. Coombe
- Succeeded by: Henry Crosby
- Parliamentary group: Liberal Union, Liberal Federation

Personal details
- Born: 8 March 1864 Angaston, South Australia
- Died: 9 October 1924 (aged 60) Millswood, South Australia
- Parent: James Hague (father)

William "Will" Hague (8 March 1864 – 9 October 1924) was a South Australian businessman and member of the South Australian Legislative Assembly.

== History ==
Hague was born in Angaston, South Australia on 8 March 1864, a son of James Hague, who was later a member of the South Australian House of Assembly for Barossa (1890–1902). Will Hague was educated at a private school in Angaston run by James Leonard. He worked in Adelaide for a time as merchant and Customs agent before returning to Angaston to become a junior partner in the firm of J. & E. Hague. Later he founded the firm of W. Hague & Co., in which he retained the controlling interest until its sale in 1918.

Hague believed in the personal interest of parents in the education of their children, and was involved in the Angaston School Board of Advice. He was a member and secretary of the Angaston Agricultural Society. He served as chairman of the District Council of Angaston and trustee of the Angaston Institute. He was for many years a valued correspondent of The Advertiser at Angaston. He had been a strong advocate for the railway to Angaston, believing that railways were essential in the development of the district.

In 1912 Hague was elected to the House of Assembly, where he represented the Barossa district for the Liberal Union, and held that seat until his death. In 1913 he became a member of the Railways Standing Committee, and held that post under successive governments. When his close friend George Ritchie resigned the post of chairman of the Parliamentary Liberal Party to assume Ministerial office, Hague was elected in his stead, to the benefit to his party. He smoothed many a political disturbance over with a few well-considered words. He resigned this position, with that of chairman of the Railways Standing Committee, when he was appointed Commissioner of Public Works in 1920. In a rearrangement of portfolios some time later Mr. Hague became Treasurer of South Australia, in succession to George Ritchie, and Minister of Railways, and he did much to secure the stability of the finances of the State during an extremely difficult period.

In politics he was characterized as having an "extreme conscientiousness, allied to a sweet disposition", had a "commonsense, methodical turn of mind" and a "high sense of honor" and was held in high regard by political friends and opponents alike. He was not afraid to criticize fellow party members A. H. Peake and Sir Richard Butler. He opposed discriminatory measures against settlers of German origin during World War I, and was a supporter of Indigenous Australians.

He died at his residence, "Kirami", Avenue Street, Millswood, South Australia.

== Family ==
He married Elizabeth Maud Weller on 3 December 1885; they had three daughters Ellman "Queenie" (Mrs George H. Gallacher, died 9 September 1923), Tessa Hague, Vera E. "Ray" Hague (Mrs. Howard Micklem) and a son, Reece Hope Hague (ca. November 1892 – ), who after working as a journalist and serving with the 51st Battalion in France during World War I, emigrated to Canada.

Political offices
Preceded by George Ritchie	Commissioner of Public Works; 1920–1922	Succeeded by Thomas Pascoe
Preceded by George Ritchie	Treasurer of South Australia; 1922–1924	Succeeded by John Gunn
