= Samuel Dening Glyde =

Australian politician

Samuel Dening Glyde (18 August 1842 – 27 January 1898) was a politician in the colony of South Australia.

Glyde was born in Wayford, Somerset in 1842. He migrated to Victoria, Australia at age 18 but moved on to New Zealand. He lived in Prebbleton in rural Canterbury and was well known for his contributions towards the establishment of an education system in the Broadfield and Springston districts. He was a local farmer and in addition, he was surveyor and clerk for the road boards of Springs and Lincoln. He left New Zealand for Adelaide in mid-1871 and his farewell dinner in Prebbleton was chaired by Arthur Charles Knight, the local representative on the Canterbury Provincial Council, and Christchurch identity John Ollivier gave an entertaining address.

Glyde moved to South Australia in mid-1871 and found employment with his brother's firm Morgan, Connor, & Glyde, wheat merchants, later becoming a partner. In 1882 they joined a consortium, the Adelaide Milling Company, with John Hart & Co., W. Duffield & Co., James Cowan & Co., and Harrold Brothers.

He purchased land which he subdivided as the suburb Sefton Park.

He was an able writer, and made significant contributions to both the Register and The Advertiser, and other publications interstate and overseas.

He served from 1875 to 1878 as Mayor of the Town of Kensington and Norwood. He was involved in the South Australian Volunteer Military Force and from 1877 was Captain of F Company (Kensington and Norwood). When the Board of Governors of Canterbury College decided to set up an agricultural college, two of the five applications received were from Melbourne. Glyde was tasked with interviewing the candidates, and he travelled across from Adelaide. Both men were qualified, and whilst one of the applicants had "greater scientific attainment", Glyde recommended the other candidate, William Ivey, for the position. Glyde's recommendation was accepted, and Ivey became the inaugural director in 1878 of what is now Lincoln University.

Glyde was appointed director of the Commercial Marine Insurance Company, Warden of the Marine Board from 1880. He was elected to the seat of Sturt in the South Australian House of Assembly following the resignation of Thomas King, and served from July 1885 to April 1887, his colleague being Josiah Symon. He was chairman of the board of directors of the Town and Country Bank, which failed in 1887 immediately after the Commercial Bank of Australia,

Around 1893 he left for Mildura, Victoria, where several of his sons had taken up irrigation blocks, and was a prominent citizen, serving as Councillor 1893–1894. In 1896 he left for Perth in Western Australia. He died in Perth during a typhoid epidemic on 27 January 1898. He was buried at East Perth Cemeteries.

== Family ==
Elijah Glyde was his father, and Sarah Glyde (née Denning or Dening) was his mother. On 1 September 1864, Samuel Dening Glyde married (Anna) Cordelia England Gillingham (? – 14 December 1940) at St Peter's Anglican Church in Upper Riccarton; their children included:

- Arthur Dening Glyde (1865 – 18 September 1922), born in New Zealand, settled Western Australia c. 1900.
- Alice Cordelia Glyde (1867– ), born in New Zealand
- Blanche Mary Glyde (1869–1870), born and died in New Zealand
- William England Glyde (1870– ), born in New Zealand, married Alice Amelia Adkinson (c. 1864 – 17 January 1922) of Perth on 6 May 1897
- Samuel Stedman Glyde (3 December 1872 – 3 February 1949), born in South Australia, married Emma Maria "Em" England on 8 October 1896, later of Perth, Western Australia.
- England Gillingham Glyde (6 November 1882 – 7 April 1942), Captain, 28th Battalion, 1st AIF, married (nursing Sister) Irvin Bartley Whiteley ( – 12 June 1954) on 29 March 1919
- Frank Cave Glyde (10 March 1884 – 17 February 1947) married Phillis Napier Birks on 4 April 1913, later of Perth, Western Australia.

William Dening Glyde (c. 1826 – 4 January 1901), wheat merchant and MLC was a brother.
