= William Gilbert (politician) =

Australian politician

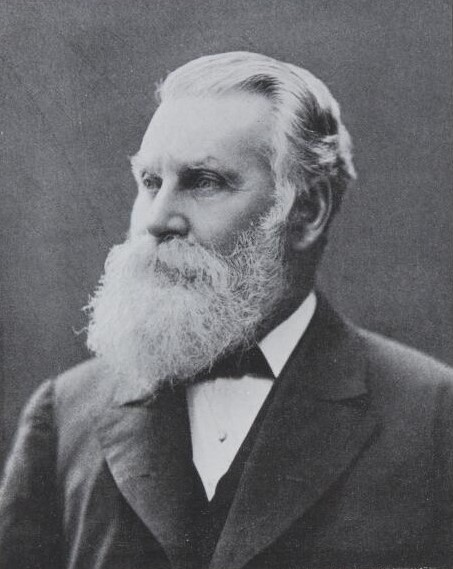
- Born: February 23, 1829
- Died: February 4, 1919 (aged 89)
- Occupation: Miller

Member of the South Australian Parliament for Yatala
- In office 1881–1902
- Preceded by: John Darling Sr.
- Succeeded by: seat abolished

Member of Parliament for Barossa
- In office 1902–1906
- Preceded by: Expanded to three seats
- Succeeded by: Samuel Rudall

William Gilbert (23 February 1829 – 4 February 1919) was a politician and philanthropist in South Australia. He was a member of the South Australian House of Assembly from 1881 to 1906, representing the electorates of Yatala (1881-1902) and Barossa (1902-1906).

== History ==
Gilbert was born in Aylesbury, Buckinghamshire, the only son of a successful millwright and engineer, and was educated at what was later described as the "best private school in the county" but which Gilbert himself criticised as "cramming Greek and Latin rather than teaching first principles", At 19 years of age he took over his father's business, and ran it for ten years. Around 1860 he followed his father into the flour-milling business with a mill at High Wycombe 20 miles from London. He was involved in agitation against the Corn Laws. The mill business was quite successful, though limited by lack of capital but a continual struggle against competitors, suppliers and debtors, and he sold his share to his partner and with his ailing wife emigrated to South Australia (perhaps influenced by the high reputation of Australian wheat), arriving in 1869.

After a year of setbacks he secured a temporary position as traveller for Giles & Smith, a large wheat buyer and flour-miller in Waymouth Street, and before the six months' contract was over Gilbert had established a business of his own in North Adelaide. He was then offered a position with a chaff mill in Tynte Street, North Adelaide, with an option to purchase. Under his management the production of chaff rose from three tons a week to thirty. He took in a partner, Charles Willcox. Eleven years later he decided he could comfortably retire to England, but after experiencing one winter he decided Australia was his true home and at the end of fourteen months returned to South Australia. He had fortunately not given up his interest in the fodder business. His nephew William Gilbert Payne (ca.1865 – 5 April 1926), also from Aylesbury, emigrated around 1885 and helped with his uncle's chaff and fodder business, which, as Gilbert & Co. opened mills at Gawler and Wasleys, handling 1,000 tons a month, much of it exported to Sydney. He sold the business, perhaps to Payne, who continued its management after Gilbert's death.

Gilbert was for twenty years a member of the Savings Bank board.

== Politics ==
Gilbert was elected to the South Australian House of Assembly seat of Yatala in 1881 with David Murray and against William Cavanagh. He remained a member of Parliament for Yatala, and Barossa, its replacement after redistribution, for 26 years. He led the Independent Country Party for five years until its split. He was offered ministries, but always refused, preferring the freedom of the back bench. He was largely responsible for the Constitution Amendment Act, which reduced the number of parliamentarians.

After losing his seat in the House of Assembly, possibly due to his longstanding fight against the totalizator (he succeeded in having it outlawed for three years), Gilbert twice contested the Central seat in the Legislative Council, but was unsuccessful.

When Gilbert left parliament in 1906 he was the "Father of the House".

== Philanthropic activities ==
In an interview Gilbert once said "The necessity to work is one of the blessings that come to humanity. I would not recommend any man to retire from business simply because he has enough to live on. If he has health he is better for being employed. I remained in business till about the year 1908, and if I had known I should be as well as I have been I would have stuck to it longer." After his year's sojourn in England he not only returned to the chaff business; he took up a range of activities:

- He had always been a worshipper at the North Adelaide Baptist Church (then on LeFevre Terrace; its minister was J. L. Parsons), but took on responsibilities in the Church, the Baptist Union and Missionary Boards.
- He was for twenty-five years on the Adelaide Hospital board and twenty years on the Children's Hospital board.
- He was on the Adelaide Benevolent Society (or Benevolent and Stranger's Friend Society) for about 20 years, serving as president and vice-president.
- He worked for the Royal Institution for the Blind, North Adelaide, for about 30 years from its inception.
- He was a founder of the Adelaide Y.M.C.A. and a director for about 40 years, including a stint as president.
- Royal Agricultural Society for about 35 years and its President 1895–1897. He was instrumental in securing the Jubilee Exhibition Hall at Wayville for the Society in place of its site in the North Parklands.
- He was one of the Charity Commissioners for thirty years.

He was also involved with:

- South Australian Cricketing Association
- Chamber of Commerce
- Chamber of Manufactures
- Botanic Garden board
- Adelaide Oval Sports Committee
- National Park Board
- Angas Charities Mission
- Blind, Deaf, and Dumb Institution
- Adelaide O.B.I. (Our Boys' Institute)
- Bible Society (perhaps British and Foreign Bible Society)
- Bible Reading in State Schools Board
- Adelaide City Mission
- Adelaide Sunday School Union South Australian Sunday Schools Union
- Adelaide Aborigines' Society
- Da Costa Samaritan Hospital

Gilbert received no financial consideration from any of these activities and did not believe politicians should be paid.

== Personal ==
Gilbert was a Bowls player.

As old age bore down on him, Gilbert relinquished his many positions, but the Charity Commission was the last to go. He was confined to his room at his Fitzroy Terrace, Medindie, home for many months but retained his faculties to the last and did not take to his bed until the last days of his long and useful life.

Gilbert's wife Jane, whom he married before leaving England, died aged 60 on 28 November 1895. He married again on 14 April 1904 to Jane Mossman "Jeanie" Simpson (née Davie) (c. 1837 – 15 April 1910) but had no children by either marriage. Jeanie was the mother of architect Alfred Edward Simpson.

South Australian House of Assembly
Preceded by John Darling Sr.	Member for Yatala; 1881–1902; Served alongside: Richard Butler	District abolished
District expanded to three members	Member for Barossa; 1902–1906; Served alongside: Richard Butler, Ephraim Coombe	Succeeded by Samuel Rudall
