= 1924 Barossa state by-election =

A by-election was held on 22 November 1924 for one of the seats of the three-member electoral district of Barossa, South Australia. The cause for the by-election was the death of William Hague on 9 October 1924. Despite a field of seven candidates from three parties for three seats at the general election in March, only two candidates stood for the by-election in November. The result was that Henry Crosby for the Liberal Federation with 3732 votes defeated Michael Joseph Murphy for the Labor Party with 3063 votes.

== Polling booths ==
The polling booths for the by-election were at: Gawler, Gawler South, Anna, Truro, Moculta, Two Wells, Virginia, Mount McKenzie, Salisbury, Stockwell, Angaston, Wasleys, Smithfield, Onetree Hill, Roseworthy, Lyndoch, Mallala, Williamstown, Loos, Tanunda, Cockatoo Valley, Dublin, Wildhorse Plains, Redbanks, Northfield, Abattoirs, Gilles Plains, Sedan, Nuriootpa, Keyneton, Punyelroo, Enfield, Blanchetown.

== Dates ==
The writs were issued on 17 October 1924. Nominations closed on 28 October with polling day on 22 November.

== Results ==
Barossa state by-election, 22 November 1924
Party	Candidate	Votes	%	±%
Liberal Federation	Henry Crosby	3,732	54.9	
Labor	Michael Joseph Murphy	3,063	45.1	
Total formal votes		6,796	99.5	
Informal votes		32	0.5	
Turnout		6,828	55.9	
Liberal Federation hold		Swing	N/A	
