= Willaston General Cemetery =

Cemetery in Willaston, South Australia

- Interactive map of Willaston General Cemetery

Details
- Established: 1862
- Location: Willaston, South Australia
- Country: Australia
- Coordinates: 34.57799°S 138.74172°E
- Website: Town of Gawler: Cemeteries – Willaston
- Find a Grave: Willaston General Cemetery
- Footnotes: Willaston General Cemetery CWGC

The Willaston General Cemetery on Dawkins Avenue, Willaston, South Australia opened on 1 August 1866. to replace the original burial ground on Murray Street, Gawler, South Australia was made in the mid 1850s, with the headstones from the original cemetery moved to the entrance.

Interments at the cemetery include:

- Ephraim Henry Coombe, (1858–1917) journalist and politician
- Leslie Duncan, (1880–1952), newspaper editor and politician
- Walter Duffield, (1816–1882) miller, pastoralist and politician
- Job Harris, (1840–1882) prominently associated with the discovery of gold at the Barossa Goldfields
- James Martin, (1821–1899) manufacturer and politician
- Frederick May, (1840–1897) engineer and manufacturer
- John McKinlay, (1819–1872) explorer
- Esmond Walter New, (1900–1982) Presbyterian minister and air force chaplain
