= Mannahill, South Australia =

Mannahill
- Town
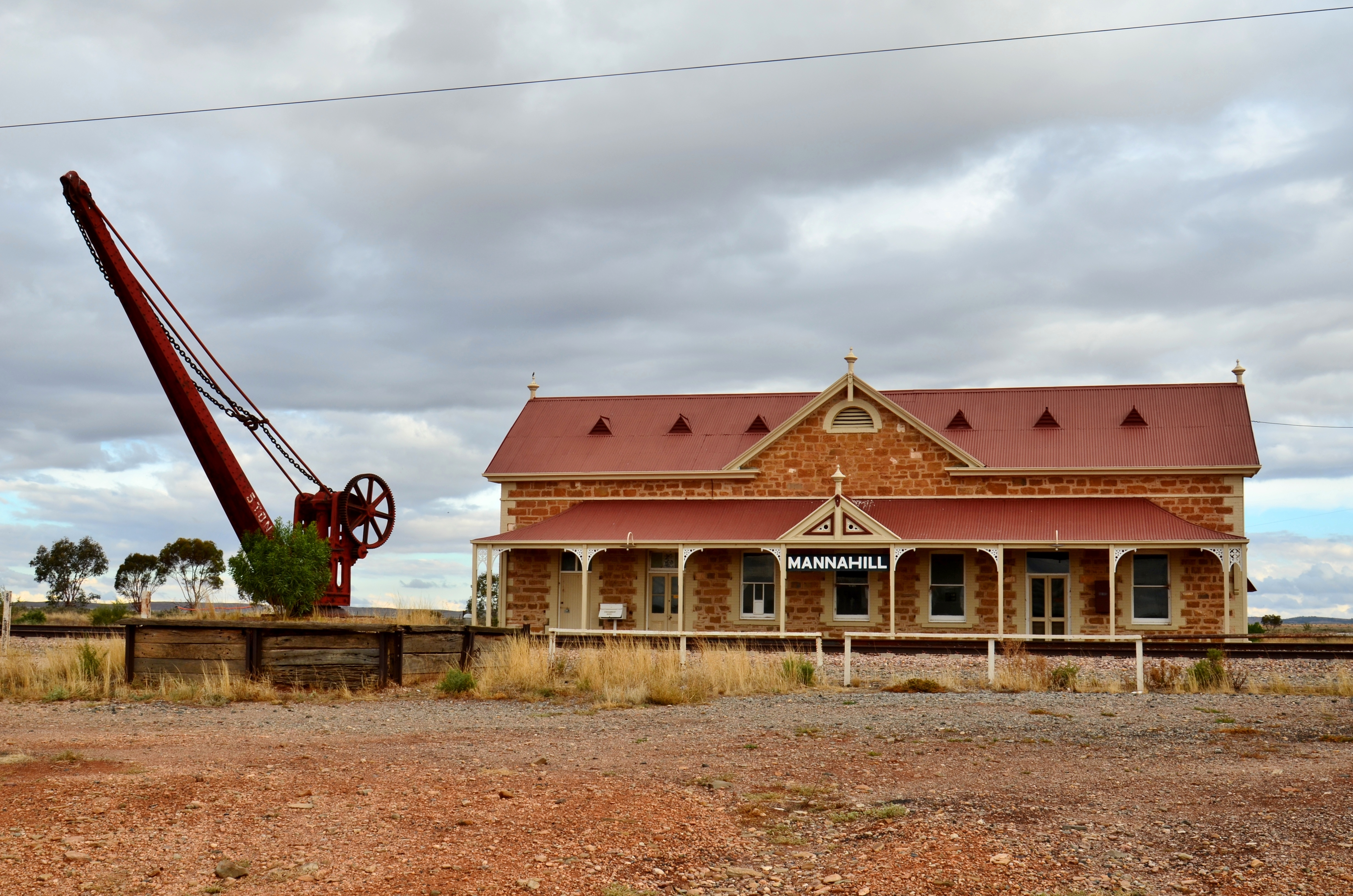
- The railway station.

- Coordinates: 32°25′48″S 139°59′14″E
- Country: Australia
- State: South Australia
- Region: Far North
- LGA: Pastoral Unincorporated Area
- Location: 42 km (26 mi) NE of Yunta; 153 km (95 mi) SW of Broken Hill; 129 km (80 mi) NE of Peterborough
- Established: 10 March 1887 (town); 23 October 2003 (locality)

Government
  - State electorate: Stuart
  - Federal division: Grey
- Elevation: 370 m (1,210 ft)
- Postcode: 5440
Localities around Mannahill
Florina Station	Florina Station	Florina Station
Florina Station	Mannahill	Oulnina
Oulnina	Oulnina	Oulnina

Mannahill (gazetted as Manna Hill) is a town and locality in the Australian state of South Australia. Mannahill is in the Northeast Pastoral district and is one of the easternmost settlements in South Australia.

== History ==
Mannahill was located on the stock route that passed from the Barrier Ranges in New South Wales to the then rail head at Terowie. The village also supported early gold mining activity at Mannahill and at Wadnaminga to the south. Mannahill was surveyed in the mid-1880s as a water-supply and maintenance point on the Peterborough to Cockburn railway line which was completed in 1887. The railway station had been previously constructed in 1886.

In September 1886 a deputation, consisting of William Dening Glyde, M.L.C., Messrs. William Copley, William Henry Beaglehole, and David Bews, M.P.s, H. Nackin, and A. Champion, met the Commissioner of Crown Lands (Hon. J. Horn) seeking £600 to encourage further gold mining at the Mannahill Goldfields.

Shortly afterwards this article appeared in the Melbourne Argus on 22 October 1886 in the context of the goldrush to the Mannahill goldfields:

The journey is principally across saltbush plains and low undulating hills, lightly timbered with mulga and ti-tree. Water and food on the road are both scarce and of inferior quality. The distance from Adelaide to Petersburg (now Peterborough) is 150 miles. The first train leaves Adelaide about 8 o'clock in the morning, and reaches Petersburg at 3pm. A second train leaves Adelaide shortly before 5 in the evening, but only goes as far as Terowie 10 miles from Petersburg, reaching Terowie at midnight. There is one train a day from Petersburg to Mannahill. This journey covers a distance of between 80 and 90 miles, over flat uninteresting country. Provision has to be made by travellers for their own refreshments until Mannahill is reached. Here there is a large hotel, capable of accommodating about 50 people. In shearing time the proprietor does a fair trade, shearers and teamsters from the surrounding stations being the principal customers. The country around here possesses a very dreary outlook.

The village still has the Mannahill Hotel which was built in 1889. Mannahill Police Station is situated in Railway Terrace, Mannahill. Local weather records have been kept at Mannahill for 109 years.

== Heritage listings ==
Mannahill has a number of heritage-listed sites, including:

- Barrier Highway: Mannahill railway station
- Antro Woolshed and Shearers Kitchen

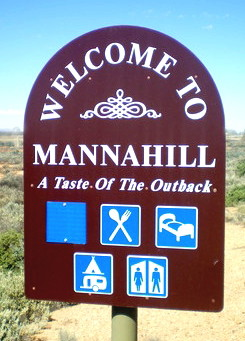
A Mannahill entry sign.

== Governance ==
Manna Hill is located within the federal division of Grey, the state electoral district of Stuart and the Pastoral Unincorporated Area of South Australia. As of 2016, the community within Manna Hill received municipal services from a South Australian government agency, the Outback Communities Authority.
