= William Dening Glyde =

Australian politician

William Dening Glyde (c. 1826 – 4 January 1901) was a wheat merchant and politician in the colony of South Australia.

Glyde was born the son of Elijah Glyde, a gentleman farmer of Waylord, Somerset and his wife Sarah, née Dening or Denning. After working on his father's property for about 15 years he decided in 1866 to try his luck in South Australia, his brother S. D. Clyde having emigrated to New Zealand some five years earlier. Glyde and his wife arrived in South Australia in January 1867.

He was an able writer, and shortly after arriving in Adelaide received an offer for employment with the Melbourne Argus, which he accepted and made his way to the sister colony of Victoria. He soon decided to return to Adelaide however, and went into business as a corn merchant, in 1873 joining forces with Sir William Morgan and Charles Hawkes Todd Connor as Morgan, Connor, and Glyde at 43 King William Street. His brother Samuel joined the company and later became a partner; Connor left in 1880. In 1882 they joined a consortium, the Adelaide Milling Company, with John Hart & Co., W. Duffield & Co., James Cowan & Co., and Harrold Brothers.

William Dening Glyde was not actively involved in the new company, rather he set up a business with his son Edward as wheatbrokers and commission agents.

He was a prominent member of the Congregational Church, and two of his ancestors were among the 2,000 ministers who in 1662 were ejected from the Church of England ("The Great Ejection") for refusing to accept the new prayer-book. He acted for many years as commercial editor of The Advertiser.

He served as a member of the South Australian Legislative Council from May 1882 to June 1887; this was during the period when members were elected by the whole colony, acting as one electorate.

== Family ==
William Dening Glyde married; they lived at the corner of Ruthven Street (now Glyde Street, named for him) and Howard Street, North Kensington. Their family included:

- Edward Jonathan Glyde (c. 1858 – 30 April 1933) married Emily Kay ( – 19 October 1924), youngest daughter of William Kay, on 10 July 1903, lived at "Clwydd", North Kensington.
- John Glyde ( – ) farmed in New Zealand.
- Evan Anstice Glyde ( – 3 July 1944) married Ethel May Bartleet ( – ) on 12 January 1915; farmed in New Zealand
- William Dening Glyde (c. 1863 – 5 February 1897) was a surveyor in West Australia.
- James Henry Glyde ( – 1870)
- May Glyde ( – )

Samuel Dening Glyde (18 August 1842 – 27 January 1898) was a brother.

W. D Glyde's newspaper obituary mentions that "(they) landed in January, 1867, and were welcomed by relatives". It is possible Lavington Glyde was such a relation.
