= Broadfield, New Zealand =

Broadfield
- Rural locality
- Interactive map of Broadfield
- Coordinates: 43.605°S 172.471°E
- Country: New Zealand
- Region: Canterbury
- Territorial authority: Selwyn District
- Ward: Selwyn Central; Springs
- Electorates: Selwyn; Wigram; Te Tai Tonga (Māori)

Government
  - Territorial authority: Selwyn District Council
  - Regional council: Environment Canterbury
  - Mayor of Selwyn: Lydia Gliddon
  - Selwyn MP/Wigram MP: Nicola Grigg/Dominik Yanzick
  - Te Tai Tonga MP: Mananui Ramsden

Area
  - Total: 50.02 km^{2} (19.31 sq mi)

Population (June 2025)
  - Total: 2,070
  - Density: 41.4/km^{2} (107/sq mi)
- Time zone: UTC+12 (New Zealand Standard Time)
  - Summer (DST): UTC+13 (New Zealand Daylight Time)

Broadfield, sometimes called Broadfields, is a rural locality in the Selwyn District of New Zealand. It is located between Rolleston, Prebbleton and Lincoln.

Broadfield NZ Landscape Garden is a private garden covering 3.5 hectares (8.6 acres), which is open to the public two days a week.

== Demographics ==
Broadfield is the major part of the statistical area of Trents, which covers 50.02 km^{2} (19.31 sq mi). It had an estimated population of 2,070 as of June 2025, with a population density of 41 people per km^{2}.

Historical population
Year	Pop.	±% p.a.
2006	1,482	—
2013	1,854	+3.25%
2018	1,917	+0.67%
2023	1,998	+0.83%

Trents had a population of 1,998 in the 2023 New Zealand census, an increase of 81 people (4.2%) since the 2018 census, and an increase of 144 people (7.8%) since the 2013 census. There were 1,026 males, 960 females, and 12 people of other genders in 693 dwellings. 2.6% of people identified as LGBTIQ+. The median age was 47.6 years (compared with 38.1 years nationally). There were 288 people (14.4%) aged under 15 years, 357 (17.9%) aged 15 to 29, 975 (48.8%) aged 30 to 64, and 381 (19.1%) aged 65 or older.

People could identify as more than one ethnicity. The results were 88.0% European (Pākehā); 7.1% Māori; 2.3% Pasifika; 7.7% Asian; 0.9% Middle Eastern, Latin American and African New Zealanders (MELAA); and 4.1% other, which includes people giving their ethnicity as "New Zealander". English was spoken by 96.8%, Māori by 1.1%, Samoan by 0.2%, and other languages by 9.2%. No language could be spoken by 1.7% (e.g. too young to talk). New Zealand Sign Language was known by 0.3%. The percentage of people born overseas was 18.2, compared with 28.8% nationally.

Religious affiliations were 32.7% Christian, 0.3% Hindu, 0.5% Islam, 0.9% Buddhist, 0.5% New Age, and 0.8% other religions. People who answered that they had no religion were 56.3%, and 8.3% of people did not answer the census question.

Of those at least 15 years old, 399 (23.3%) people had a bachelor's or higher degree, 951 (55.6%) had a post-high school certificate or diploma, and 357 (20.9%) people exclusively held high school qualifications. The median income was $48,400, compared with $41,500 nationally. 300 people (17.5%) earned over $100,000 compared to 12.1% nationally. The employment status of those at least 15 was 879 (51.4%) full-time, 330 (19.3%) part-time, and 21 (1.2%) unemployed.

== Education ==
Broadfield School is a full primary school catering for years 1 to 8. It had a roll of 146 as of July 2026. The school opened in 1868. The current principal is Jarrad Welsh.

== Notable people ==
- Samuel Dening Glyde, farmer and educator
- Gerald Stokell, amateur ichthyologist
