= Harrold Brothers =

Harrold Brothers was a merchant and shipping company in South Australia in the second half of the 19th century, whose principals were brothers Joseph, Daniel and perhaps Henry Harrold, and succeeded by Joseph's sons Arthur, Eyston and Ernest.

== Foundation ==
Joseph Harrold (22 October 1822 – c. 5 April 1891) was born in Olney, Buckinghamshire, son of miller Joseph and his wife Jane Harrold. An early trip in his adventurous life was to Cape Town, when he almost perished on a walking trip to Algoa Bay. He visited South Australia on the St. Helena in January 1844.

In 1847 he emigrated with his brother Daniel Harrold (1828 – 22 August 1873) on the Royal Archer, arriving in Adelaide in January 1848 and in June he took over Thomas Barnes' grocery store at 24 Hindley Street. By November they were describing themselves as grocers and ironmongers. In 1850 Joseph formed a partnership with John Slatter as Slatter and Harrold, millers and wheat merchants, with a flour mill "Adelaide Steam Mills" on Mill Street, Victoria Square. Around the end of 1852 a dispute arose between Slatter and Harrold Brothers which resulted in Slatter's withdrawal from the partnership.

A third brother, Henry C. Harrold arrived from London on the Gipsy Queen in August 1850, had an ironmongery business "Harrold and Co.", 18 Hindley Street in partnership with Charles Jenkins from 1863, was declared bankrupt in 1866.

In 1857 Joseph Harrold returned to England with his wife and two young sons, and set up a London branch of the firm in Great St. Helens, EC, very close to the Liverpool Street station, leaving the Adelaide end in the hands of his brother Daniel.

They held, in partnership with Walter Duffield as Duffield, Harrold and Company, Weinteriga station (between Menindee and Wilcannia, New South Wales) in 1859, and Outalpa Station, between Mannahill and Olary, South Australia around 1865. This partnership later included overseer William Hurd (c. 1836–1992).

== Second generation ==
In 1873 Daniel died in 1873 and in late 1875 Joseph's sons Arthur and Ernest, born in Fullarton, South Australia but educated in England, returned to Adelaide to help run the business. A third brother, Leonard, had been admitted to the firm, and based in London. He visited Adelaide in 1875.

They divested the company of its pastoral interests; Hurd and Henry Foote (c. 1820–1893) purchased the Outalpa in 1876, and George Riddoch (c. 1843–1919) purchased the Weinteriga runs around the same time.

The firm expanded, becoming one of the largest shipping agents in the colony, with massive warehouses in Port Adelaide and Port Augusta and Port Pirie, and branches in Broken Hill, Sydney and Melbourne as well as London.

== Shipping ==
Harrold Brothers founded the "Adelaide Line", later known as the "Harrold Line", carrying passengers and cargo between London and Adelaide, and around the Australian coast. Ships they either owned, part-owned or leased included:

- Channel Queen 1865–1870
- Alchymist 1866–1869
- Clodian 1866–1884
- George Shotton 1867–1876
- Chaa Sze 1868–1873
- St. Vincent 1868–1886 clipper
- City of Adelaide 1869–1886 clipper
- Gateside 1872–1876
- Glen Osmond 1872–1878
- Outalpa 1873–1879
- Nevada 1873–1880
- Barossa 1874–1891
- Barossa 1874–1896
- SS Glenelg 1875–1881, 1,300 tons register, 2,400 tons burthen; the first regular scheduled steamer between London and Adelaide.
- Myrtle Holme 1876–1896
- Wild Wave 1876–1896
- Runnymede 1876–1882
- Pekina 1877–1879
- Rodney 1877–1881
- John Rennie 1877–1890
- Brier Holme 1878–1896
- Eden Holme 1879–1894
- Gulf of Finland 1882, which was wrecked on Zuqar Island in November 1882.
- SS Karaweera 1882–1898
- Castle Holme 1883–1895
- SS Port Stephens of 2,208 tons, chartered in 1894, and carried trial shipment of live sheep.

and were agents for many other owners. including, from 1884 to 1896, Compagnie des Messageries Maritimes. They also had a presence on the River Murray in 1865 and 1866, with the paddle steamer Wentworth.

In 1882 they joined a consortium, the Adelaide Milling Company, with John Hart & Co., W. Duffield & Co., James Cowan & Co., and William Dening Glyde.

In 1894, they made a pioneering trial of live sheep export, by the steamer Port Stephens, which proved profitable.

== Failure ==
Arthur Harrold was elected to the South Australian House of Assembly seat of North Adelaide in April 1896. Around this time it was becoming apparent that Harrold Brothers' finances were built on a shaky foundation, but he resisted calls for him to resign from parliament. Creditors G. & R. Wills precipitated the company's demise by suing them for unpaid debts, followed by George Scarfe and A. M. Simpson. Insolvency hearings dragged on for three years, with C. C. Kingston defending Arthur and C. M. Muirhead appearing for his brother Ernest. The third brother, Leonard Frederick Harrold, the partner managing the London office, was not at first brought in as one of the creditors, then complained of having been kept in the dark about the company's insolvency, and expressed a desire to join the priesthood.

Both principals were declared bankrupt, with a second-class certificate suspended for three months. Arthur was singled out for special condemnation as he had systematically hidden the true state of the company's finances by hiding debts, inflating assets and converting assets held in trust. Commissioner Russell sentenced him to two years' jail.

== Family ==
- Joseph Harrold (22 October 1822 – 5 April 1891) married Sarah Jane Lucas (1818–1901) in England in 1853; they had three sons and two daughters:

- Arthur Lucas Harrold (18 December 1854 – July 1908) married Eva Annie Morgan ( – 5 October 1931) on 25 February 1879

- Evelyn Mary Harrold (19 November 1879 – 6 December 1946) lived at 84 LeFevre Terrace, North Adelaide.
- Eyston Harrold (23 January 1883 – ) married Margaret Campbell Pyers ( – ) on 11 August 1917

- Ernest Eyston Harrold (22 October 1856 – 18 February 1907) married Florence Eugenie Burt ( – 8 December 1923) at North Adelaide on 16 March 1887; they had three sons, lived at Largs Bay. Born on his father's 34th birthday.
- Leonard Frederick Harrold (1858–1924) married Josephine Booth ( – ) on 18 April 1888

- Daniel Harrold (1828 – 22 August 1873) married Mary Ann Church
- Henry Charles Harrold (c. 1830 – 7 February 1883) married Catherine Peake in April 1858
