= Horndale =

Location in South Australia

Horndale is an historical location in South Australia, home of the Horndale Winery.

== History ==
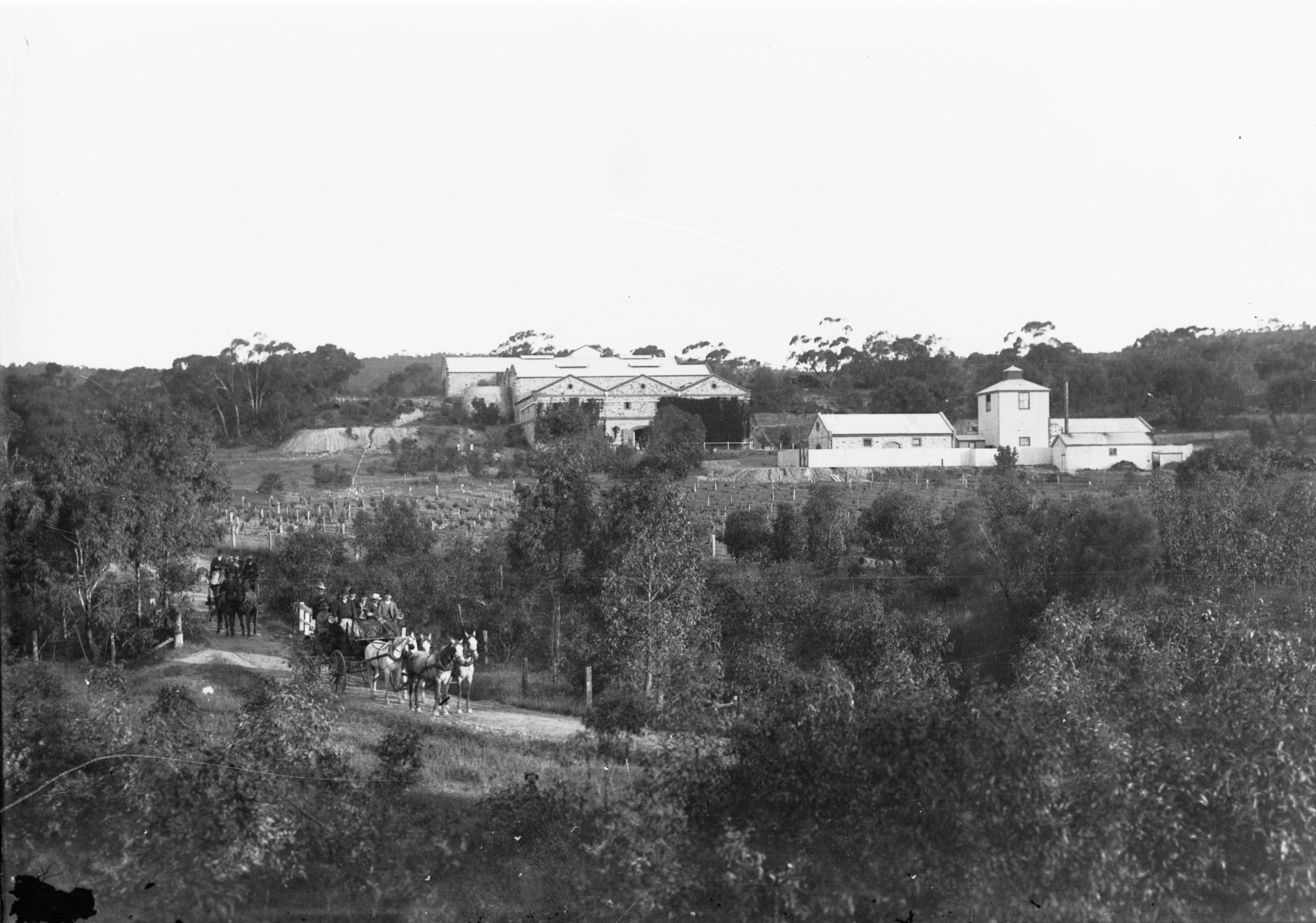
Horndale Winery and Cellars, approximately 1905.

Horndale winery was established by Thomas Sutherland Horn (1849–1914), Percy Austin Horn (1851–1927) and Charles Austin Horn (1855–1928) were partners in the stockbroking firm of Horn & Co. (founded ) with offices in Comstock Chambers, King William Street, Adelaide. They were sons of Edward Kirk Horn (1809–1882) and his wife Emily Horn, née Austin. Another brother, William Austin Horn MHA, was not involved with the firm.

Around 1890, with the collapse of the Broken Hill mining boom, the brothers purchased a vineyard at Happy Valley, South Australia, jointly owned with Richard Vernon Cholmondeley (died 1918). (Note: Cholmondeley's older sister, Mary Cholmondeley (8 June 1859 – 15 July 1925), was author of Red Pottage and Diana Tempest. She never came to Australia.) Magnificent cellars were started in 1896, under the design and supervision of Cholmondeley, who was also responsible for those at Vale Royal winery, 2.4 kilometres (1.5 mi) to the west. The partnership was dissolved on 1 August 1904, and ownership passed to the partnership of Cholmondeley and Herbert Percival Basedow.

In 1902 the property was 320 acres, of which two hundred acres were under vine, mostly Cabernet and Shiraz, from which Bernard "Ben" Basedow (c. 1880 – 13 July 1930), second son of M. P. F. Basedow MLC, made a full-bodied, dry red claret type, which took first prize at the Sydney Show. In 1910 258 acres were under grapes.

In 1909 Basedow purchased the Horndale establishment, until his death operating it as a model winery and distillery with the assistance of his brother Alf and input from brother Herbert.

In 1947 Horndale was purchased by the Sydney office of the US meat processing firm of Swift & Company, and the cellarage capacity reduced from 350,000 to 200,000 imperial gallons (1,590 to 910 kL) and new distillation plant installed. The winery at that time covered 170 acres (69 ha).

== Later history ==
Since 1984 the winery has been operated by the Albrecht family. Its business is now winemaking and distillation, purchasing grapes from vineyards in nearby McLaren Vale and Langhorne Creek. The Horndale vineyard now (2024) covers around one acre, planted with red Frontignac vines, whose grapes are used for brandy.

== See also ==
- William Austin Horn for a list of the historical Horn family members
