= George Riddoch =

Australian politician

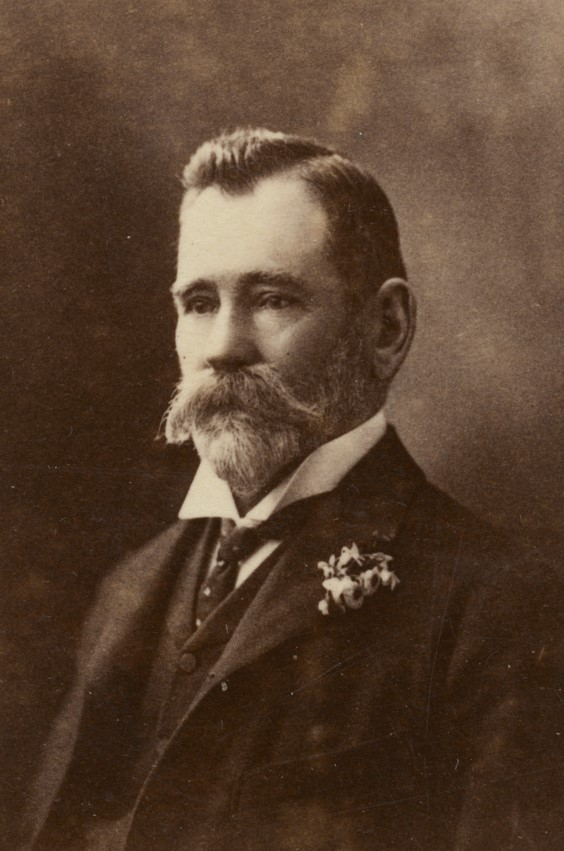

George Riddoch (10 August 1842 – 23 April 1919) was an Australian pastoralist and politician. He was a member of the South Australian House of Assembly from 1893 to 1896, representing Victoria, and a member of the South Australian Legislative Council for Southern District from 1901 to 1910.

== History ==
Riddoch was born at Turriff, in Aberdeenshire, Scotland, and he arrived in Victoria with his parents in 1851. He was educated at the Geelong Seminary.

In 1861 he left for the South-East of South Australia, where his brother John Riddoch (1827–1901) had invested heavily in the pastoral industry. He helped run his Yallum and Katnook stations, near Penola and Weinteriga on the Darling River, New South Wales, which he purchased from Harrold Brothers around 1876.

He and his brother purchased Glencoe station, founded by Edward and Robert Leake, which covered 53,000 acres (21,000 ha) and featured a magnificent woolshed now held by the National Trust. When the Riddoch brothers dissolved their partnership in 1898, George took the northern half, which he named "Koorine". John broke up his portion for closer settlement. At his station, near Kalangadoo, 20 miles (32 km) north of Mount Gambier, George bred Merino sheep and Hereford cattle. He later became the owner of the Nalang, Wirriga, and Cannawigra Stations near Tatiara. He was also involved in dairy farming and wheat growing; at one stage he had some 8,000 acres (3,200 ha) under cultivation.

== Politics ==
His brother John was elected to the district of Victoria in the House of Assembly with Adam Lindsay Gordon, and served from March 1865 to April 1870 and from December 1871 to April 1873.

In 1893 George Riddoch followed his brother as a member of the House of Assembly for the District of Victoria, and served a three-year term. In 1901 he was returned to the Legislative Council as a representative of the Southern District, and retired at the end of 1909. He was recognised as an advocate and defender of primary producers. He was a National Defence League member throughout his time in parliament.

== Other interests ==
He was an active member of the Mount Gambier Caledonian Society, and served a period as Chief. He and his brother were members of the Adelaide Club. He was involved in a scheme to purchase Adam Lindsay Gordon's cottage "Dingley Dell" for the nation, but failed when the property was sold privately.

In 1908 he purchased, in London, Edwin Douglas's oil painting Jersey Beauties, which he presented to the Art Gallery of South Australia

He was a member of the Royal Geographical Society of South Australia, and served a term as vice-president.

He was a keen horseman, for a time owning several racehorses, and was a member of the local Hunt Club.

== Family ==
Riddoch married Ann Eliza Wilson (ca.1841 – 3 March 1914) on 26 August 1873. She was a daughter of the (Anglican) Rev. James Yelverton Wilson, of Portland, Victoria.

Their only daughter Adelaide Mary Riddoch (28 May 1874 – 3 January 1904) married (military) Captain George Frederick Napier on 15 March 1898. George and Ann retired to "Corega", Mitcham; the Napiers took over "Koorine".
