= Arthur Harrold =

Australian politician

Arthur Lucas Harrold (18 December 1854 – c. 25 July 1908) was a businessman and politician in South Australia. He was later jailed for serious financial offences.

Arthur was born in Fullarton, South Australia, the eldest son of Joseph Harrold (c. 1821 – c. 5 April 1891) and around 1857 the family returned to England. He was educated at the Aspley Guise School and King's College London, where he graduated AKC. In 1875, he and his brother Ernest returned to Adelaide to take over the firm of Harrold Brothers, which had been founded by their father and his brother Daniel around 1854. Their father founded and managed the London office, then around 1884 retired to his home Wanstead Hall, in Wanstead, Essex.

The firm began as a hardware store on Hindley Street, then grew to become one of the largest shipping agents in the colony, from 1869 owning the Adelaide Line of clippers, which included the City of Adelaide.

Arthur was on the boards of the Bank of Adelaide, Bagot Shakes and Lewis, the Imperial Insurance Company, Luxmoore & Company, Harrold, Colton and Company, and the Queen's Wharf Company.

He was a member of the Public Stores Commission and the Civil Service Commission of 1886 and 1888 respectively, set up to investigate the efficiency of government instrumentalities.

He was President of the Adelaide Chamber of Commerce, of the Federated Employers' Council, and of the National Defence League. He was a Fellow of the Royal Geographical Society of London, of the Royal Statistical Society of London, the Colonial Institute, the Royal United Service Institution, the Geographical Society of South Australia, and the Royal Society of South Australia. He held the office of Major with the South Australian Voluntary Defence Force, and was a prominent Freemason.

He was a member of the South Australian House of Assembly representing North Adelaide from April 1896 to April 1897. Around 1896 it was becoming apparent that Harrold Brothers' finances were built on a shaky foundation, but he resisted calls for him to resign from parliament. Creditors G. & R. Wills precipitated their decline by suing them for unpaid debts. Insolvency hearings dragged on for three years, with C. C. Kingston defending Arthur and C. M. Muirhead appearing for his brother Ernest. Both principals were declared bankrupt, with a second-class certificate suspended for three months. Arthur was singled out for special condemnation as he had systematically hidden the true state of the company's finances by hiding debts, inflating assets and converting assets held in trust. Commissioner Russell sentenced him to two years' jail.

He left South Australia for London in 1905 on business and never returned.

== Family ==
Arthur married Eva Annie Morgan ( – 5 October 1931) on 25 February 1879 and lived at Barnard-street, North Adelaide. They had two children:

- Evelyn Mary Harrold (19 November 1879 – 6 December 1946)
- Eyston Harrold (23 January 1883 – ) married Margaret Campbell Pyers ( – ) on 11 August 1917

His brother Ernest Eyston Harrold (22 October 1856 – 1907) was also born in Fullarton, South Australia.
