= James Andrew Trehane Lake =

Australian politician

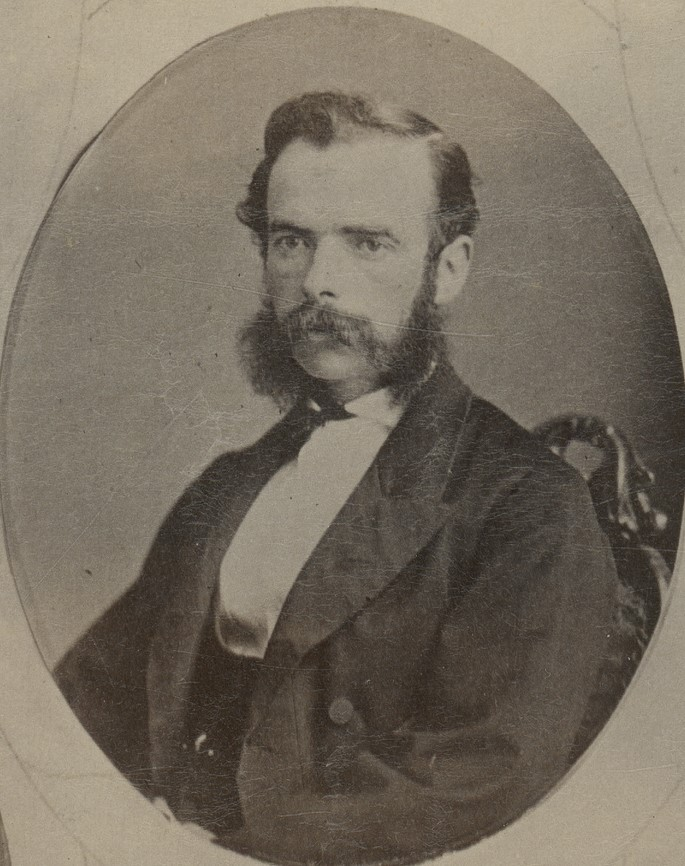

James Andrew Trehane Lake (c. 1840 – 13 March 1876), generally referred to as J. A. T. Lake, was a businessman, lawyer and politician in the British colony of South Australia.

== History ==
James was born in London to Henry Lake (1811–1878) and his wife Ann née Trehane (died 1885), and the older brother of George Hingston Lake (1847–1900). The family arrived in South Australia in 1853.

e had, with his father and brother, an interest in a sheep station on the Eastern Plains near the Barrier Range, on which they worked for five years, but were forced to leave after a devastating flood.

He studied law in England, serving his articles with (later Sir) Samuel Way, and though he had broken this service for ten weeks to help with the pastoral property, was admitted to the Bar in 1867, and immediately set up a practice of his own, later joined by F. O. Bruce, and the partnership continued for about a year.

In 1871 he and Charles John Reynolds, later mayor of Port Adelaide, purchased John Thomas Fielder's timber yard, which as Lake & Reynolds they ran, brother George serving as accountant, until 1877, when they sold the business to A. Clausen; the property shortly became the site of the Port Adelaide Market. He also had a financial interest in some copper mines in the mid-north.

He was elected to the seat of Barossa in the South Australian House of Assembly, defeating Walter Duffield, and served from December 1871 to February 1875, a colleague of J. H. Angas. In contrast with his business life, he was not noted as a forceful or innovative politician. He did not seek a seat in the next Parliament owing to ill health. He died at his home in Enfield.

== Family ==
He married Harriette Bridgetina Dyer on 13 July 1867; they lived in "Menindee near North Adelaide" (presumably Medindie), later Barton Terrace, North Adelaide. Their children included:

- Ethelinde Augusta Lake (11 May 1868 – 29 September 1917)
- Percival James Lake (12 July 1871 – 6 December 1875)
- Pearl Eglantine Lake (20 October 1874 – )
- James Herbert Trehane Lake (22 March 1876 – ) born at Redruth after the death of his father

Harriette Bridgetina (or Harriet Bridget) married again, to Henry John "Richard" Whittington

His eldest sister Sarah Ann Trehane Lake (ca.1835 – 25 October 1895) married Anthony James Liddell; another sister, Philippa Hodge Lake married Charles Kerr Herriot on 10 April 1873; his youngest sister Catherine Trehane Lake (ca.1850 – 28 November 1918) married Stuart Robert Herriot on 17 July 1875.
