= James Martin (South Australian politician) =

Australian politician

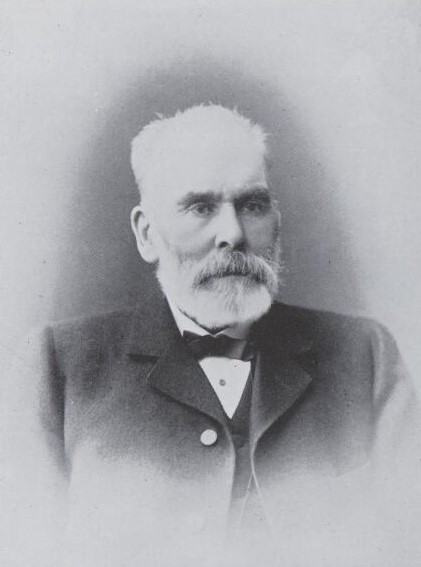

James Martin (1821 – 27 December 1899) was an industrialist and politician in the early days of the Colony of South Australia.

== History ==
James Martin was born in the hamlet of Foundry, in the parish of Stithians, Cornwall, in straitened circumstances, the seventh child of a woman whose husband had died a few months previously. He had little schooling, and after starting to earn his own money, he enrolled in night classes. He worked at the local factory making steel shovels, as a millwright in Truro's flour mills, and as a fitter in the Tresavean copper mine, where he was involved in the installation of a large mine pump and a prototype of Michael Loam's "man engine", all the time gaining practical engineering knowledge. He served as a maintenance worker at a woollens factory at Ponsanooth, where an older brother was manager.

He suffered from asthma, which was exacerbated by Cornwall's climate and the atmosphere of these workplaces, and decided for his health's sake to try his luck in South Australia, and emigrated on La Belle Alliance, arriving in July 1847. He found work at Hindmarsh with John Ridley, erecting a flour mill. Determined to work for himself, he moved to Gawler on 15 June 1848, a fact that was celebrated there exactly 50 years later. Although then a tiny village, Gawler seemed a likely spot for development as a waypoint between Adelaide and the mines of Burra, the farms of the Barossa Valley, the River Murray and the incipient wheatfields of the Lower North.

He rented a blacksmith's shop from John Calton and began building bullock drays. He built a lathe, press and workbenches from local timber. With hard work, attention to detail, and by accepting any job, business grew. He started working on a farm of his own, "Trevue", where he developed implements that were manufactured by his "Phoenix Foundry" (founded around 1859). Martin & Co. became a major employer in the town. He took on Thomas Flett Loutit (ca.1832 – 20 September 1873) as a partner. It has been claimed that the first stump-jump plough was made by Martin & Co. Their machinery was successfully exhibited at the various Agricultural Shows. They tried smelting iron from local ore, but the experiment was not a resounding success.

The copper mines at Burra presented the next opportunity, and soon the Phoenix Foundry was manufacturing all kinds of engines, pumps, crushing and winding gear. A premium was placed on prompt supply, and the company profited. The next step in the company's evolution was the manufacture of railway engines and rolling stock to meet the colony's burgeoning railway system. Altogether, some 150 locomotives were built; some being sent interstate. By 1898 they had 700 employees.

== Politics ==
James Martin was a member of the Gawler Council, and its mayor for eight years. He was elected for the seat of Barossa in the House of Assembly in February 1865 with Walter Duffield as a colleague, and retired in 1868. He was elected to the Legislative Council for the North-Eastern district in May 1885 and reelected in April 1894, dying in office. He was a member of the National Defence League.

== Other interests ==
He was actively involved with the Gawler Institute (which sponsored the contest won by Caroline Carleton and Carl Linger's Song of Australia), Freemasons, the Gawler Agricultural Society, the Building Society, and the Gawler Rifles (the local branch of the voluntary militia) and the School of Mines and Industries. He was elected a Member of the Institution of Mechanical Engineers, England. He successfully bred Hereford cattle at "Trevue".

His burial at Willaston General Cemetery was attended by a large contingent from Adelaide and locally.

== Family ==
He married three times: to Christiana Fox ( – 1852) on 28 March 1848, to Ann Lock ( – 1853) on 6 March 1853, and to Mrs. Charlotte Vickerstaff ( – 7 November 1894) on 2 August 1858. They lived at "Trevue", Gawler East. Among his children were:

- John "Cap'n Jack" Martin (1850 – 18 May 1925) married Adelaide Isabel Annie Parr (1857–) on 27 December 1882, and inherited his father's farming properties. He was later Mayor of Brighton.

He adopted his nephew John Felix "Mr. J. F." Martin (14 August 1844 – 13 December 1916), who married Christina McNeil ( – 27 December 1931) in 1889. John was made a partner in his adoptive father's business, became General Manager, then Chairman of Directors. They had two sons and two daughters, one of whom, Emily Martin (1884–1962), married Henry Hampden Dutton (1879–1932) of Anlaby Station. The other three moved to Western Australia. In 1908 John followed his sons to Mount Barker, Western Australia, where he died eight years later.
