= Reginald Rudall =

Australian politician

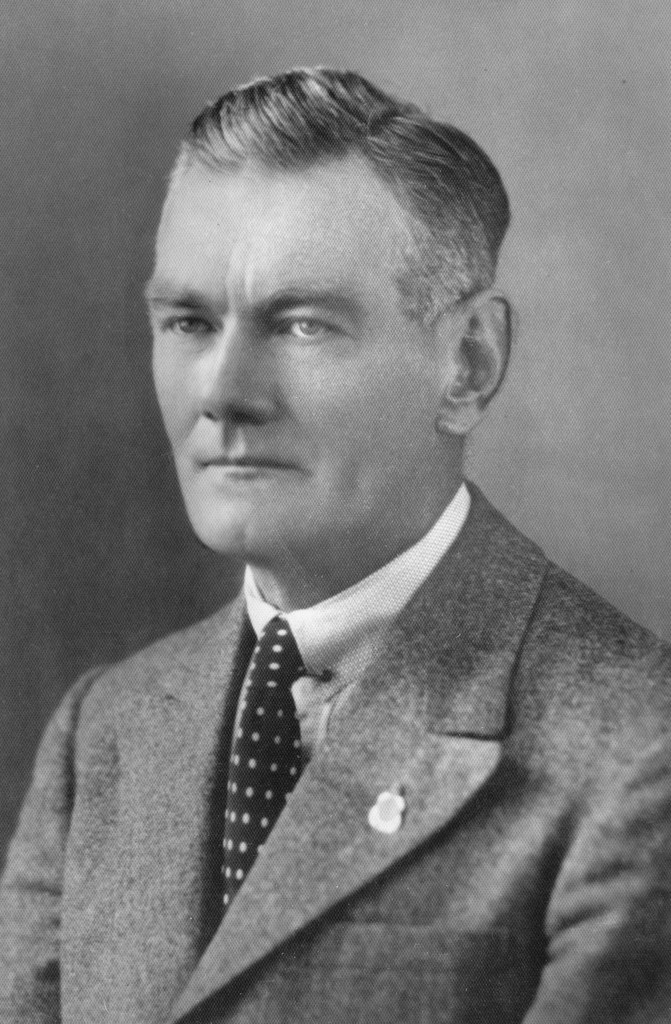

Reginald John Rudall (27 September 1885 – 1 January 1955) was a lawyer and Liberal Country League politician in Gawler, South Australia. His father, Samuel Bruce Rudall, was member for Barossa 1906–1915.

== History ==
Reginald Rudall was born at Gawler, the son of Samuel Bruce Rudall (1859–1945) and Margaret Rudall, née McNeil. He was educated at Miss Burton's Private School in Gawler, Queen's School in North Adelaide, and St. Peter's College. He read law at the University of Adelaide then served his articles with his father firm of Rudall & Rudall and in the firm G. & J. Downer. He was admitted to the Bar in 1907. In 1908 he was awarded a Rhodes scholarship, which he used to further his studies at Oxford University.

He enlisted in the AIF in 1915 and served with the 50th Battalion in France. In September 1918 he was appointed assistant director of the newly formed AIF Education Service in London, where he was promoted to the rank of captain shortly before in May 1919 returning to Australia.

He returned to Gawler, where he rejoined his father's firm of Rudall & Rudall and lectured in Constitutional Law at the University of Adelaide from 1920 to 1925. He was elected to the House of Assembly at a July 1933 by-election in the seat of Barossa. In 1938, when the House of Assembly moved from multi-member to single-member districts, he contested and won the new seat of Angas. Thomas Playford became premier in the following November and appointed Rudall to his cabinet as Commissioner of Crown Lands (1938–1944), Minister of Repatriation and Minister of Irrigation (1938–1946) and Minister of Lands (1944–1946).

Following the outbreak of the Second World War, Rudall's two sons enlisted and both were lost in action: Peter on HMAS Sydney on 19 November 1941, and Jake was killed at Buna, Papua in December 1942.

Rudall had the responsibility of implementing the soldier-settlement scheme with memories of the failures of earlier schemes still fresh in the minds of South Australians. As a returned soldier he was able to maintain a degree of goodwill from returned servicemen when bureaucracy and Federal government financial problems delayed the purchase of suitable land. He became a legal adviser to the Returned Sailors', Soldiers' and Airmen's Imperial League of Australia.

He stood for a Midland seat in the Legislative Council in 1944 and retained it until 1955. He was, in the Legislative Council, the chief ally of Premier Playford in his program of taking over the monopolistic Adelaide Electric Supply Co. and regional suppliers, and the formation of the State-owned Electricity Trust of South Australia. He later served as Attorney-General of South Australia from 1946 to 1955 and Minister of Education from 1946 to 1953. He also served as Minister of Industry and Employment.

== Family ==
He married Kathleen Clara Sutherland on 20 January 1914. They had two sons, both killed in World War II:

- John Glasgow "Jake" Rudall (20 June 1920 – December 1942)
- Peter Sutherland Rudall (31 May 1922 – 20 November 1941)

He died on New Year's Day 1955 in Calvary Hospital; he was accorded a state funeral and was buried in the A.I.F. section of the West Terrace Cemetery.

Political offices
Preceded by Charles Abbott	Attorney-General of South Australia; 1946-1955	Succeeded by Thomas Playford IV
South Australian House of Assembly
Preceded by Herbert Basedow	Member for Barossa; 1933–1938	Electorate abolished
Preceded by New electorate	Member for Angas; 1938–1944	Succeeded by Berthold Teusner
South Australian Legislative Council
Preceded by David Gordon	Member for Midland District; 1944–1955	Succeeded by Ross Story
