= Joseph Barritt =

Australian politician

Joseph Barritt (1816 – 17 August 1881) was a pastoralist and politician in the colony of South Australia.

== History ==
Barritt was born in Hazeleigh, near Maldon, Essex, and emigrated to South Australia on the Anna Robertson in 1839 with an introduction to John Barton Hack, a fellow Quaker for whom he ran a farm. He next ran a farm for John Richardson, later taking up his own properties "Woodlands" around 1856 then "Riverside" around 1859, both in the Lyndoch Valley.

He was for several years partner with Walter Duffield in a 10,000 acres (4,000 ha) pastoral lease adjacent to the Burra Special Survey.

He was for many years a member of the Barossa East Council, and in 1859 succeeded Thomas Sandland as Chairman. There was a long association between the Barritts and Sandlands. Two Sandland boys married Barritt girls and in 1886 H. T. H. Morris, (Note: Henry Thomas Hindmarsh Morris (c.1858 – 10 September 1937) was eldest son of Henry Thomas Morris, nephew of Governor Hindmarsh, and one of his fellow passengers on HMS Buffalo.) W. E. Sandland and E. Barritt formed the auctioneering firm of Morris, Sandland and Barritt, which in 1888 was incorporated as Wilkinson, Dempsey and Sandland Ltd.

In November 1862 he was elected to the House of Assembly, as Duffield's associate for the seat of Barossa, but retired after little more than one year, owing to rapidly deteriorating eyesight, and became almost totally blind. His wife died on 27 June 1881 and he died a few months later.

== Family ==
He married Mary Ann Harrison (c.1815 – 5 April 1848) on 7 March 1843, the first Quaker marriage in South Australia. She died in childbirth. He married again, to Hanna Sophia May (c.1819 – 27 June 1881) whose father, Joseph May (1787 – 11 March 1878), was a prominent Mount Barker Quaker, on 12 May 1853. Their children were:

- Joseph Earn Barritt (26 November 1843 – 8 February 1849) drowned accidentally in the South Para River. He and his mother were among the few to be buried in the grounds of the Friends Meeting House in North Adelaide.
- Elizabeth Ann (24 January 1845 – 2 September 1923) married Benjamin Sanders (c.1829 – 16 December 1916) on 21 February 1865.
- Charles (6 January 1847 – 1 October 1922) married Jane McDonald on 31 March 1875. Wife Jennie died 14 January 1916. They owned Mallara station, 100 miles (160 km) up the Darling from Wentworth
- Lucy Maria Barritt (6 June 1855 – 5 December 1896) married R(obert) Cooper Sandland (18 April 1849 – 25 October 1921) on 9 October 1878. Sandland, at one time mayor of Jamestown, married again, to Agnes Mitchell of Jamestown.
- Walter Barritt (23 August 1856 – 3 August 1927) married Ellen Mary Capper (25 May 1848 – 19 November 1917) on 28 January 1880, lived at "Highlands", Lyndoch. He married Elizabeth Williams on 4 June 1919.
- Ellen Mary Barritt (8 February 1858 – 3 May 1919) married Thomas Sandland (c.1851 – 10 May 1932) on 29 December 1881.
- Edwin Barritt (22 August 1859 – 22 December 1940) auctioneer, married Jessie Ann Williams ( – 19 February 1946) on 13 October 1887; they lived at "Riverside", Lyndoch. A daughter, Josephine Margaret Barritt (1889 – 7 June 1946), married architect Walter Hervey Bagot, and is remembered as an author.
- Hannah Morris "Annie" Barritt (24 February 1861 – 25 May 1935) married Thomas Black Williams (c.1867 – ) on 12 June 1888, lived at Blackwood then Eden Hills.
- Francis M. C. "Frank" Barritt (1 January 1863 – 12 November 1918) was pastoralist, owner Yattalunga station, near Gawler. He married Mary Charlotte Twigg ( – 6 July 1915) on 4 September 1889; was married to Gertrude Hanbury Barritt when he died. A son, Francis Earn Barritt, was prominent in the sports of golf, tennis and polo.
- Herbert Edward Barritt (12 April 1865 – 14 September 1934) dairy farmer with brother Francis at "Yattalunga"
- Edith Margaret Barritt (18 June 1867 – ) lived at Mitcham
