= M. P. F. Basedow =

Australian politician (1829–1902)

M. P. F. Basedow

Martin Peter Friedrich Basedow (25 September 1829 – 12 March 1902), commonly referred to as Hon. M. P. F. Basedow or Hon. F. Basedow, was a German-born newspaper proprietor and politician in the British colony of South Australia.

== History ==
Basedow was a native of Hanover, Germany who arrived in South Australia aboard the Pauline in March 1848.

Basedow, C. H. Barton, and Georg Valentine Eimer (c. 1824 – c. 3 April 1901), trading as George Eimer & Co. purchased the German language newspaper Süd Australische Zeitung in late 1862 and, contrary to promises and expectations, immediately moved production from Tanunda to Adelaide. The partnership was dissolved on 31 January 1863 and Eimer became sole owner, then brought in Basedow as partner in Basedow, Eimer & Co. In January 1870 they founded the Australische Zeitung, and Süd Australische Zeitung continued to be published until December 1874, when it was absorbed into Australische Zeitung, and Dr. Carl Muecke was appointed editor. In 1876 they absorbed the Neue Deutsche Zeitung, a competing paper published by G. C. L. and F. A. Reiger, and J. W. A. Sudholz.

Basedow represented Barossa in the South Australian House of Assembly from 20 May 1876 to 22 April 1890 when he failed to be reelected. He was Minister of Education in the Morgan Ministry from March to June 1881. He entered the South Australian Legislative Council for the electorate of North-Eastern District on 19 May 1894 and held the seat until 18 May 1900.

== Family ==
Basedow married Johanna Maria Kiesewetter (died 1867) in 1852.

- Ida Maria Elizabeth Basedow was born in 1853.

He married again, to the widow Anna Clara Helena Schrader (died 1921) in 1868.

- His second son, Bernard Basedow (c. 1880 – 13 July 1930), born in Tanunda, was the vigneron of Horndale with his brother Alfred Basedow (born 1875).
- Erwin Basedow (born 1873) studied mineralogy in Clausthal, Germany.
- Herbert Basedow, his youngest son, born 1881 in Kent Town, South Australia, was a well-known anthropologist and geologist.
