= James Hague =

Australian politician

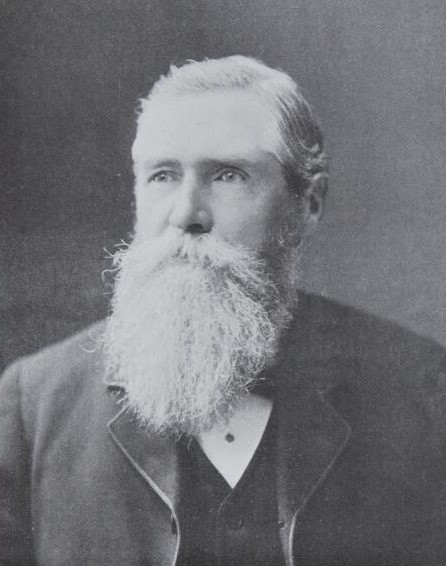

Member of the South Australian Legislative Assembly for Barossa
- In office 23 April 1890 – 2 May 1902
- Preceded by: M. P. F. Basedow
- Succeeded by: District changed to three-member

Personal details
- Born: 17 September 1834 Manchester, England
- Died: 16 August 1916 (aged 81) New Parkside, South Australia
- Occupation: Storekeeper

James Hague (17 September 1834 – 16 August 1916) was an Australian politician who represented the South Australian House of Assembly multi-member seat of Barossa from 1890 to 1902. He represented the National Defence League in 1893 and 1896.

Hague was born in Manchester, England and emigrated to the colony of South Australia in 1855.
