= Herbert Lyons =

Australian politician

Herbert William Lyons (30 September 1888 – 1 September 1958) was an Australian politician who represented the South Australian House of Assembly multi-member seat of Barossa from 1933 to 1938 for the Liberal and Country League.
