= Herbert Basedow =

Australian politician

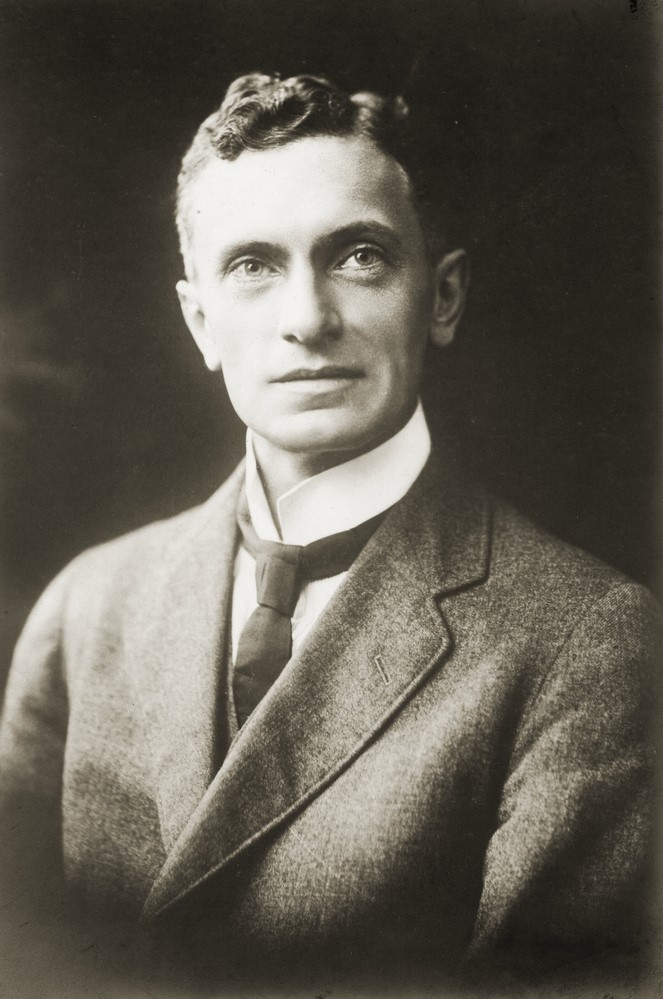
- Herbert Basedow
- Born: 27 October 1881; Kent Town, South Australia
- Died: 4 June 1933 (aged 51); Kent Town, South Australia
- Education: Prince Alfred College; School of Mines, Adelaide (B.Sc.); University of Adelaide
- Occupations: Anthropologist, geologist, explorer, medical practitioner and politician

Herbert Basedow (27 October 1881 – 4 June 1933) was an Australian anthropologist, geologist, politician, explorer and medical practitioner.

Basedow was born in Kent Town, South Australia, a son of Martin Peter Friedrich Basedow (1829–1902). His early education was in Adelaide, South Australia and Hanover, Germany. After finishing his schooling, Basedow studied science at the University of Adelaide where he majored in geology. Basedow later completed postgraduate studies at several European universities and undertook some medical work in Europe.

During his working life, Basedow took part in many major geological, exploratory and medical relief expeditions to central and northern Australia. On these expeditions, he took photographs and collected geological and natural history specimens and Aboriginal artefacts.

Basedow was one of the few people of his time involved in recording the traditional life of Aboriginal Australians. He also actively lobbied government for better treatment of Aboriginal people and campaigned for an improvement in Aboriginal health.

Elected at the 1927 election as an independent to the three-member seat of Barossa, Basedow served as a member of the South Australian House of Assembly for a three-year term. He was defeated at the 1930 election but was again elected at the 1933 election, shortly before his death in June that year.

During his career, Basedow published widely on anthropology, geology and natural history. He also published detailed accounts of some of his expeditions and two major anthropological works on Aboriginal Australians.

== Personal life ==
Herbert Basedow was born in Kent Town, South Australia, the youngest son of Martin Peter Friedrich Basedow and his second wife Anna Clara Helena, née Muecke (or Mücke). Martin and Anna were both born in Germany and met after immigrating to Australia.

Basedow's early education was in Adelaide. The Basedow family visited Germany between 1891 and 1894, and for part of that time Herbert Basedow attended high school in Hanover. He completed his schooling at Prince Alfred College, Adelaide. Between 1891 and 1902, Basedow completed a Bachelor of Science degree at the School of Mines, Adelaide, and the University of Adelaide. He majored in geology, but also studied botany and zoology.

Basedow was elected an associate member of the Royal Society of South Australia in 1901 and a fellow in 1904. He was also a member, honorary member and fellow of other geographical and geological societies in Australia, Great Britain and Germany.

After completing his university degree in 1902, Basedow held some short-term government appointments including as one of four prospectors on the 1903 South Australian Government North-West Prospecting Expedition. In 1905, he joined South Australian Government Geologist Henry Yorke Lyell Brown and mining inspector Lionel Gee on a geological expedition to the Northern Territory. On his return to Adelaide, Basedow was appointed curator of the geological and mineral collections of the South Australian School of Mines where he classified the 2500 specimens in the School's geological collection. His catalogue was published in 1907.

Basedow was a keen photographer, and throughout his career he used photography to record his scientific work and his travels in remote parts of Australia. A set of 200 images taken on the 1903 South Australian Government prospecting expedition are the earliest known photographs by Basedow. He included more than 500 of his photographs in the articles and books he published and used them to illustrate his public lectures.

In 1907, Basedow accepted an invitation from German anthropologist Hermann Klaatsch to study in Germany. In Europe, he completed postgraduate studies at several universities, including Heidelberg, Göttingen, Breslau and Zürich, and undertook some medical work. Basedow returned to Australia with a PhD in geology and two postgraduate qualifications in medicine. The medical degree he was awarded based on his work on the craniometric measurements of Aboriginal Australians, combined with his practical medical work in Europe, later allowed Basedow's registration as a medical practitioner in Australia.

On his return from Europe in 1910, Basedow entered the geological department of South Australia as Assistant Government Geologist. He resigned from this position in 1911 to take up the newly created Australian federal government position of Chief Medical Officer and Chief Protector of Aborigines in the Northern Territory. He arrived in Darwin on 17 July 1911 and left 45 days later unhappy with his working conditions and claiming the legislation under which he was operating was unworkable. Basedow returned to Adelaide and set up in medical practice, combining this with consulting geological investigations for individuals and organisations. He continued to publish in learned journals, mainly on anthropology but also on geology. He has been credited with assisting his brothers Ben and Alf in operating the Horndale winery and distillery.

On 4 June 1919 in Adelaide, Basedow married Olive Nell "Nellie" Noyes, daughter of organist Arthur Charles Noyes. They had no children but in 1920 adopted two Aboriginal girls from Central Australia; Undelya (Minnie) Apma (Arrernte) and Tjikana (Tjikarna) Cooper (Luritja) who they took with them to Adelaide and trained as domestic servants.

Basedow died suddenly on 4 June 1933 of peripheral venous thrombosis in Kent Town and was buried in Adelaide's North Road Cemetery.

Despite researching and publishing widely in anthropology, Basedow never held an official position as an anthropologist.

The Rev. F. W. Basedow (1866–1939) was a cousin.

== Parliament ==
After an earlier unsuccessful attempt, Basedow was elected at the 1927 election as an independent to the three-member seat of Barossa, Basedow served as a member of the South Australian House of Assembly for a three-year term. He was defeated at the 1930 election but was again elected at the 1933 election, shortly before his death in June that year.

== Expeditions ==
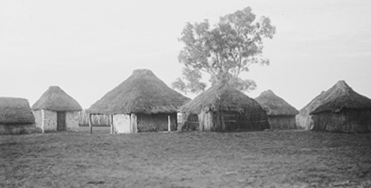
Aboriginal dwellings, Hermannsburg, Northern Territory 1923. Photographer: Herbert Basedow. National Museum of Australia collection.

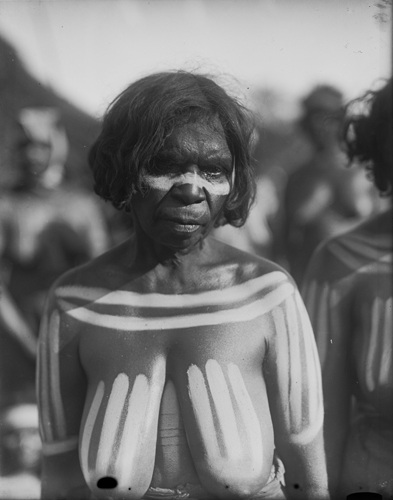
Woman painted with pipe-clay 1923. Photographer: Herbert Basedow

Between 1903 and 1928, Basedow participated in around 12 major expeditions and some smaller trips. These were mainly to central and northern Australia. On these expeditions, Basedow obtained the material on which he based his anthropological and scientific research and photographed the people he encountered and the places he visited.

The majority of the expeditions were to investigate mineral prospects. Some were government funded such as the 1903 South Australian Government North-West Prospecting Expedition and the 1905 geological investigation of the Northern Territory's western coast and hinterland. Others, like the 1916 expedition to investigate possible ore deposits in the Kimberley region of Western Australia, were commissioned by mining syndicates and private companies.

Other expeditions included three medical relief expeditions to assess the health of Aboriginal people in South Australia - one in 1919 and two in 1920 - which Basedow led. Basedow also participated in two vice-regal expeditions to central Australia: one in 1923 organised by Sir Tom Bridges, Governor of South Australia, who was keen to build a north–south railway to open up central Australia; and one in 1924 involving Lord Stradbroke, Governor of Victoria. Basedow also participated in expeditions funded by wealthy pastoralist Donald Mackay to central Australia in 1926 and Arnhem Land in 1928.

== Basedow and Australian Aboriginal people ==
At the time of his birth, Basedow's father held the office of Protector of Aborigines. In his early years, Basedow accompanied his father on trips into the outback where he played with Aboriginal children and acquired some native language skills. Throughout his life, Basedow maintained an interest in recording traditional Aboriginal life as well as a concern for the health and welfare of Aboriginal people.

The German anthropologist Hermann Klaatsch influenced Basedow's early ideas about Australian Aboriginal people. Both men theorised that Aboriginal people and Caucasians were racially related. A.O. Neville, Chief Protector of Aborigines in Western Australia between 1915 and 1940, relied on Basedow's belief that there was close relationship between Aboriginal people and Europeans as the scientific basis for his proposal to solve the Aboriginal 'half caste problem' by selective breeding.

When Arrernte artist Erlikilyika's works were exhibited in Adelaide in 1913, Basedow bought many of them. These are now in the National Museum of Australia.

Basedow actively lobbied government for better treatment of Aboriginal people, especially through the Aborigines Protection League, and campaigned for an improvement in Aboriginal health. In 1919, he instigated a public meeting to highlight South Australia's neglect of Aboriginal people which led to a series of medical relief expeditions in 1919 and 1920. Basedow led these expeditions and his wife Nell accompanied him, acting as expedition nurse.

An obituary of Basedow published in Nature magazine said that "since the death of Sir Walter Baldwin Spencer, Dr Basedow had been generally recognized as the first authority on the aborigines of Australia".

== Publications ==
Basedow presented scientific papers at the Royal Society of South Australia and published them in the Society's journal while still at university. He continued to publish in the Society's journal until 1907. He went on to publish widely in anthropology, but also in geology and natural history.

On his return from the South Australian government prospecting expedition of 1903, Basedow published three papers from material gathered on the expedition. He was awarded the University of Adelaide's Tate Memorial Medal for one of these papers. In 1904, Basedow published anthropological notes taken on the 1903 expedition, and in 1914 his full journal of the expedition was published. It included some of Basedow's photographs taken on the expedition and a map of the expedition route.

Basedow also published his account of a 1916 geological expedition to the western Kimberley. Narrative of an expedition in north-western Australia was illustrated with 61 photographs taken by Basedow during the expedition and included a map of the expedition route which also recorded many of the Aboriginal names of the places visited. It was reprinted in 2009.

In 1925, Basedow published his first book, The Australian Aboriginal. This major anthropological work included many of Basedow's own photographs. Basedow pitched his writing to a general readership to make it available to a wide audience. The Australian Aboriginal was reprinted in 1929.

Basedow's second book, Knights of the Boomerang: Episodes From a Life Spent Among the Native Tribes of Australia, was published posthumously in 1935. Once again, Basedow pitched the book to a general readership, stating in his introduction that his aim was to "recount first-hand impressions and experiences, without attempting to surround them with technicalities and extraneous embellishments". Some of Basedow's photographs in this publication are captioned incorrectly as a result of errors made when people other than Basedow labelled the prints. Knights of the Boomerang was reprinted in 2004.

== Legacy ==
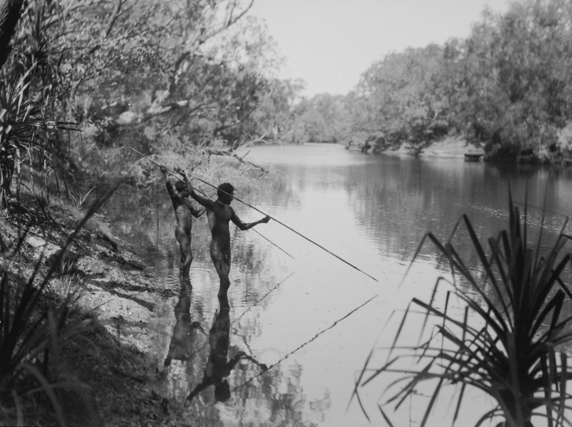
Two men spear-fishing, billabong of the East Alligator River, Arnhem Land, Northern Territory, 1928. Photographer: Herbert Basedow. National Museum of Australia collection.

Between 1903 and 1928, Basedow took photographs and collected specimens and artefacts on many major expeditions and some smaller trips, mainly to central and northern Australia. Basedow's photographs record life in the remote parts of Australia early in the twentieth century. They depict Aboriginal people, Indigenous rock art, landscapes and expedition-related activities as well as non-Indigenous people, homesteads, pastoral stations, mining activities, plants, animals and geological features.

The National Museum of Australia holds over 1000 Aboriginal artefacts collected by Basedow. Aboriginal artefacts, and geological and natural history specimens are held by the Australian Museum, Museum Victoria and the South Australian Museum. The University of Adelaide holds some geological specimens and a small number of artefacts are held by the Berndt Museum of Anthropology at the University of Western Australia.

Some 800 individual plant specimens collected by Basedow are held by some Australian herbaria, while others are held in collections in Europe and England.

The majority of Basedow's papers are held by the Mitchell Library. The South Australian Museum and the State Library of South Australia also hold Basedow papers.

The majority of Basedow's photographs are in the National Museum of Australia collection. The South Australian Museum also has some photographs, and a small number are held by the Australian Institute of Aboriginal and Torres Strait Islander Studies.

The Australian government purchased a large number of Basedow's photographs and Aboriginal artefacts in 1934. These were housed at the Australian Institute of Anatomy in Canberra and became part of the National Historical Collection at the National Museum of Australia after the Institute of Anatomy closed in 1984. The collection consists of over 1000 Aboriginal artefacts and around 2200 photographic negatives.
