= Samuel Bruce Rudall =

Australian politician

Samuel Bruce Rudall (7 March 1859 – 3 January 1945) was a lawyer and politician of the State of South Australia.

== History ==
Samuel was the elder surviving son of the John Rudall, the first town clerk of Gawler, and the first solicitor to practise there. Samuel was educated at Mr. Smilie's school in Gawler, then St. Peter's College and trained for the law, serving his articles with his father, then with G. and J. Downer. In 1881 he took over his father's practice, and became town clerk of Gawler, a position be held for 32 years. He was elected to the House of Assembly seat of Barossa for the Liberal Party in November 1906 and held the seat until March 1915, the last three years serving as Chairman of Committees.

From 1885 to 1902 he was a director of James Martin & Co., Ltd., owners of the Phoenix Foundry in Gawler. He was a longtime president of the Gawler Institute, and in 1899 president of the Gawler Literary Society. and three years later he became the first president of the Gawler Union Parliament. He was a keen Freemason.

== Family ==
Rudall married Margaret McNeil of Ashfield, New South Wales ( – 1923) on 18 December 1884. Children were

- Reginald John Rudall (27 September 1885 – 1 January 1955), a South Australian MHA and MLC
- Maude Bryce Rudall of Adelaide.

He married again, to the widow Alice Maria Warren, on 6 October 1923. She was a daughter of H. E. Downer, and owned a country residence "Nara" in Stirling, to which they retired, and where many years later he died, after a long illness.

== See also ==
- Hundred of Rudall
