= Electoral district of Barossa =

Former South Australian state electoral district

Barossa South Australia—House of Assembly
- State: South Australia
- Dates current: 1857–1938, 1956–1970
- Namesake: Barossa Valley
- Demographic: Rural
- Coordinates: 34°32′S 138°57′E

Barossa was an electoral district of the House of Assembly in the colony (Australian state from 1901) of South Australia from 1857 to 1938 and again from 1956 to 1970. Barossa was also the name of an electoral district of the unicameral South Australian Legislative Council from 1851 until its abolition in 1857, George Fife Angas being the member.

Despite Labor not even contesting the seat at the 1962 election, Barossa was one of two 1965 election gains that put Labor in government after decades of the Playmander in opposition. Labor's Molly Byrne retained Barossa at the 1968 election however the seat was abolished prior to the 1970 election. Byrne successfully moved to the new seat of Tea Tree Gully.

The Barossa Valley region is currently a safe Liberal area and is located in the safe Liberal seat of Schubert.

== Members ==
Two members (1857–1901)
Member	Party	Term	Member	Party	Term
Walter Duffield		1857–1868	Horace Dean		1857–1857
Walter Duffield		1857–1868	William Bakewell		1857–1860
Walter Duffield		1857–1868	Edward Grundy		1860–1862
Walter Duffield		1857–1868	Joseph Barritt		1862–1864
Walter Duffield		1857–1868	John Williams		1864–1865
Walter Duffield		1857–1868	James Martin		1865–1868
Richard Baker		1868–1871	Philip Santo		1868–1870
Richard Baker		1868–1871	Walter Duffield		1870–1871
John Howard Angas		1871–1876	J. A. T. Lake		1871–1875
John Howard Angas		1871–1876	Johann Sudholz		1875–1875
John Howard Angas		1871–1876	John Dunn Jr.		1875–1878
Martin Basedow		1876–1890	John Dunn Jr.		1875–1878
Martin Basedow		1876–1890	John Downer		1878–1891
James Hague		1890–1891	John Downer		1878–1891
James Hague	Defence League	1891–1896	John Downer	Defence League	1891–1896
James Hague		1896–1902	John Downer	National League	1896–1901
James Hague		1896–1902	Ephraim Coombe	Labor	1901–1902

Three members (1902–1938)
Member	Party	Term	Member	Party	Term	Member	Party	Term
Richard Butler		1902–1904	Ephraim Coombe		1902–1906	William Gilbert	National League	1902–1906
Richard Butler	Farmers and Producers	1904–1910	Ephraim Coombe		1902–1906	William Gilbert	National League	1902–1906
Richard Butler	Farmers and Producers	1904–1910	Ephraim Coombe	Liberal and Democratic	1906–1910	Samuel Rudall	Liberal and Democratic	1906–1910
Richard Butler	Liberal Union	1910–1923	Ephraim Coombe	Independent	1910–1912	Samuel Rudall	Liberal Union	1910–1915
Richard Butler	Liberal Union	1910–1923	William Hague	Liberal Union	1912–1923	Samuel Rudall	Liberal Union	1910–1915
Richard Butler	Liberal Union	1910–1923	William Hague	Liberal Union	1912–1923	Ephraim Coombe	Labor	1915–1917
Richard Butler	Liberal Union	1910–1923	William Hague	Liberal Union	1912–1923	Henry Crosby	Liberal Union	1917–1924
Richard Butler	Liberal Federation	1923–1924	William Hague	Liberal Federation	1923–1924	Henry Crosby	Liberal Federation	1923–1924
George Cooke	Labor	1924–1931	William Hague	Liberal Federation	1923–1924	Leonard Hopkins	Labor	1924–1927
George Cooke	Labor	1924–1931	Henry Crosby	Liberal Federation	1924–1930	Leonard Hopkins	Labor	1924–1927
George Cooke	Labor	1924–1931	Henry Crosby	Liberal Federation	1924–1930	Herbert Basedow	Independent	1927–1930
George Cooke	Labor	1924–1931	Thomas Edwards	Labor	1930–1931	Leonard Hopkins	Labor	1930–1931
George Cooke	Parliamentary Labor	1931–1933	Thomas Edwards	Parliamentary Labor	1931–1933	Leonard Hopkins	Parliamentary Labor	1931–1933
Herbert Lyons	Liberal and Country	1933–1938	Henry Crosby	Liberal and Country	1933–1938	Herbert Basedow	Independent	1933–1933
Herbert Lyons	Liberal and Country	1933–1938	Henry Crosby	Liberal and Country	1933–1938	Reginald Rudall	Liberal and Country	1933–1938

Second incarnation (1956–1970)
Member	Party	Term
Condor Laucke	Liberal and Country	1956–1965
Molly Byrne	Labor	1965–1970
