= E. H. Coombe =

Australian politician

Ephraim Henry Coombe
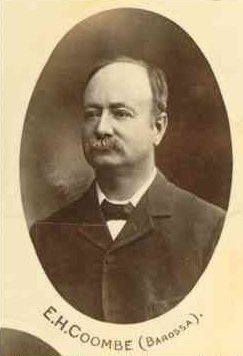

MHA
- Preceded by: John William Downer
- Succeeded by: Richard Butler, 1912, Henry Burgess Crosby, 1917
- Constituency: Barossa

Personal details
- Born: 26 August 1858 Gawler, South Australia
- Died: 5 April 1917 Semaphore, South Australia
- Party: Liberal and Democratic (1906–10), Labor (1915–17)
- Spouse: Sarah Susannah Fraser Heywood
- Profession: Newspaper editor

Ephraim Henry Coombe (26 August 1858 – 5 April 1917) was a South Australian newspaper editor and politician. He was editor of the Bunyip at Gawler from 1890 to 1914. He was a member of the South Australian House of Assembly from 1901 to 1912 and 1915 to 1917, representing the electorate of Barossa. A long-time liberal in the House, he refused to join the united conservative Liberal Union in 1910, and was defeated in 1912 recontesting as an independent. Following his defeat, he edited the Daily Herald from 1914 to 1916. He was re-elected to the House for Barossa in 1915, having joined the Labor Party, but died in office in 1917.

== History ==
Born in Gawler, Coombe was the elder son of Mary and Ephraim Coombe (ca.1828–1908), a farm-labourer and shopkeeper from Barnstaple, Devon, who came to South Australia in 1855 and from 1875 ran the store and post office at Willaston. He was educated at L. S. Burton's school in Gawler, and after working as a grocery assistant in James Harris's Gawler Stores then as a partner at his father's Willaston store, he became a journalist. From 1888 he acted as correspondent for the South Australian Register and from 1890 to 1914 was editor of the Gawler Bunyip, and to a large extent responsible for its popularity. He then worked for the Adelaide Daily Herald as editor from 1914 to 1916. He was a speedy and accurate shorthand writer, and as such appointed an official stenographer at the Federation conference at Adelaide in 1897.

== Political career ==
Coombe was president of the Barossa Political Reform League in the 1880s and an advocate of the Hare-Spence system of proportional representation. He stood as Liberal candidate for the seat of Barossa in the South Australian House of Assembly in 1896 then again in 1899, both times unsuccessfully, but won as a Labor candidate in 1901 when Sir John Downer vacated the seat to enter the Federal arena. He was reelected as an independent in 1902 and again in 1905. He was appointed Opposition whip in 1904 and Chairman of Committees in 1905. He was Commissioner of Crown Lands in the Peake Government, and chairman of the Royal Commission to enquire into the handling and marketing of wheat. He contested the 1906 election for the Liberal and Democratic Union. He held the seat until 1912, resigned from the Liberal and Democratic Union and joined Labor. He re-entered Parliament in 1915 for Labor, again as member for Barossa.

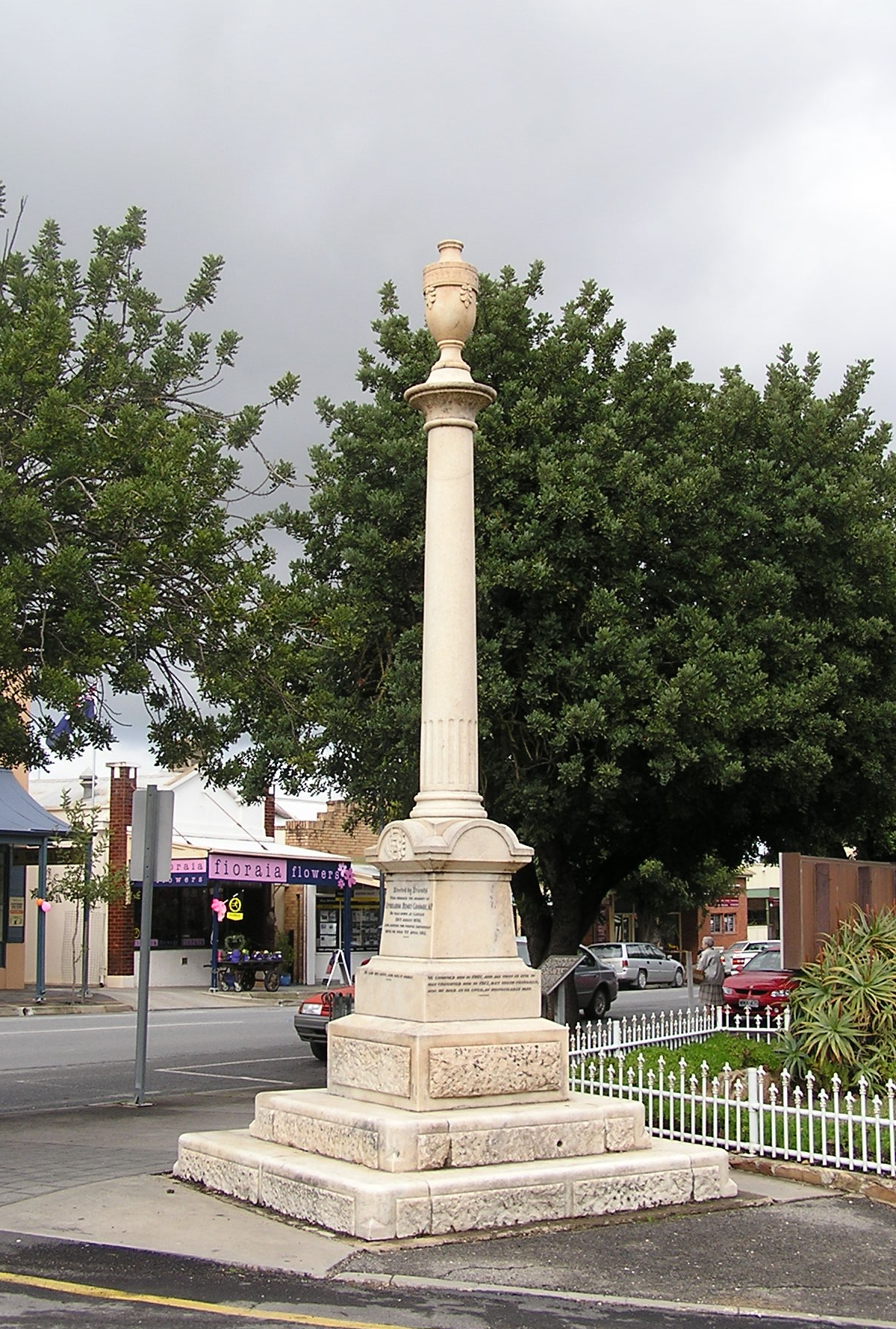
Tanunda memorial

Coombe defended residents of the Barossa Valley during World War I who were suspected of disloyalty and were persecuted because of their German heritage. He opposed anti-German measures such as the closure of Lutheran schools. He opposed conscription and the "intimidation of male voters in the referendum of 1917" He collapsed during a public meeting at Port Adelaide in support of this campaign at the Semaphore and died of a cerebral haemorrhage a week later without recovering consciousness. He was buried at Willaston. A memorial was erected in his honour in Tanunda's main street and unveiled on 2 March 1930. The plaque on the memorial read in part:

"Erected by Friends who honor the memory of Ephraim Henry Coombe, M.P. He was born at Gawler 26th August, 1858, and served the people faithfully until he died 5th April, 1917. He saw his duty and did it nobly. We crowned him in 1901 and all that is evil in man crucified him in 1917 but truth prevailed and he died as he lived an honorable man. Great in his hour of success but greater when bitterly persecuted for upholding a principle on which our great free Nation is built. Let all men draw inspiration from a life well spent and know that no greater offering can his memory crave than that which freeman offer, to the brave."

In March 1917, Coombe had been prosecuted under the War Precautions Act, fined £10 and "bound over to keep the peace". His premature death at the age of 58 from cerebral haemorrhage in 1917 has been attributed to the stress of "persecution" over the loyalty issues.

== Arts and sports ==
In 1887/88, Coombe played first class cricket for South Australia. However, he only played in one match, scoring 10 runs. He was an excellent chess player, and in 1894 narrowly missed winning the State championship.

He wrote a history of his home town, History of Gawler, 1837–1908, published by the Gawler Institute in 1910 as a memento of the jubilee of the Institute and the Municipality of Gawler, 1908.

He was also at various times:

- Governor of the Adelaide Public Library, Museum and Art Gallery in 1901–1906.
- Hon. secretary of the Gawler School of Mines from its inception.
- President of the Gawler Institute.
- President of the Gawler Literary Society, of which he was a foundation member.
- Editor of the South Australian Institutes' Journal, a monthly publication.
- Member of several musical societies.

He was a teetotaler.

== Recognition ==
The Hundred of Coombe in the South East of South Australia was named for him.

== Family ==
E. H. Coombe was the elder son of Ephraim Coombe (ca.1828 – 10 September 1908), a farm-labourer and shopkeeper from Barnstaple, Devon, and his wife Mary née Lock (ca.1836 – 23 February 1864). Ephraim married again, to Elizabeth Tall of Willunga on 22 February 1866.

Thomas Coombe (21 June 1861 – 21 March 1935) storekeeper of Willaston and chairman of the Mudla Wirra South Council, was his brother.

On 1 March 1880 in Adelaide he married Sarah Susannah Fraser Heywood (1861 – 25 November 1923) of Willaston. Three of their sons fought in World War I, one suffering maiming injuries and another killed.

== See also ==
- List of South Australian representative cricketers
