= Leonard Hopkins =

Australian politician and bootmaker

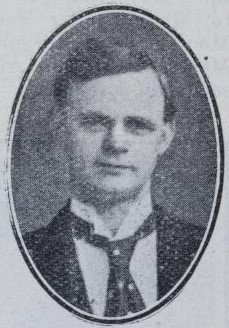

Leonard Anver Hopkins JP (22 October 1891 – 11 December 1950) was a bootmaker and politician in the State of South Australia.

Hopkins was born at Rosewater to James Robert Hopkins (died 1901) and his wife Charlotte, née Booth (died 1933). He was educated at Port Pirie State School and the Port Pirie School of Mines. From around 1905 he worked as a shoe repairer for Thomas Morgan of Ellen Street, Port Pirie, then opened his own business on The Esplanade, Solomon town, Port Pirie in 1913. He married Dorothy Edna Cook in 1915; they had two sons and three daughters.

He was elected to the Corporate Town of Port Pirie council in 1915, their youngest councillor to that time, for the Solomon town ward. He contested the mayoralty in 1919 on the resignation of A. H. Forgan, as the Labor candidate, but was defeated by Dr. Matthew Edward Goode, son of Benjamin Powell Goode supported by the Liberal Party. He also served as president of the Port Pirie Trades and Labor Council. In 1921, he left Port Pirie and moved to Adelaide. In Adelaide, he worked as a tramway employee and was vice-president of the South Australian Tramway Employees Union, then later resumed his old career of bootmaking.

He represented the South Australian House of Assembly multi-member seat of Barossa from April 1924 to March 1927 and from April 1930 to April 1933. A Labor member for most of his career, he was one of the MPs expelled in the 1931 Labor split, after which he joined the splinter Parliamentary Labor Party.

He died at Fullarton in December 1950.

== Family ==
He married Dorothy Edna "Dorrie" Cook (died 1966) on 28 December 1915; their children included Dot, Ray, Jean and Allan Edward. They lived at 68 Lipsett Terrace, Brooklyn Park.
