= George Cooke (Australian politician) =

Australian politician (1869–1938)

George Cooke (1 May 1869 – 24 March 1938) was an Australian politician who represented the South Australian House of Assembly multi-member seat of Barossa from 1924 to 1933. He was elected as a member of the Labor Party, but was expelled from the party in the 1931 Labor split and sat with the splinter Parliamentary Labor Party for the remainder of his term.

Cooke was born in Toowoomba, the son of a farmer. He was a sheep and cattle farmer and at other times a labourer and contractor for many years. He joined the Labor Party when it was first established in Queensland. He bought a home at Gilles Plains in South Australia around 1908. Having studied fruitgrowing at the Adelaide School of Mines, he established his own orchard, specialising in peaches.

He supported the White Australia Policy and opposed conscription in World War I.

He retired from politics at the 1933 election. He died in 1938, having suffered "creeping paralysis" that made him "virtually an invalid" for several years prior to his death.
