= Walter Duffield =

Australian politician (1816–1882)

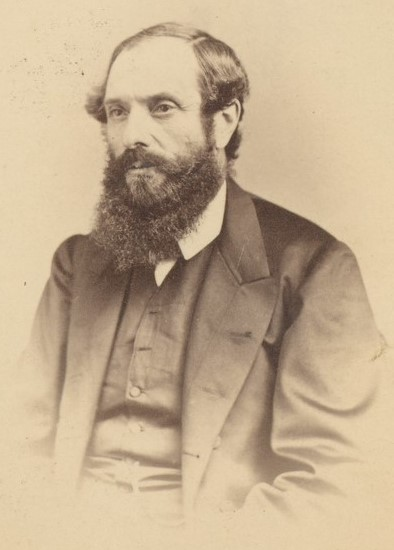

Treasurer of South Australia
- In office 23 October 1865 – 3 May 1867
- Premier: John Hart, James Boucaut
- Preceded by: Arthur Blyth
- Succeeded by: Thomas Reynolds

Member for Barossa in the South Australian House of Assembly
- In office 9 March 1857 – 6 April 1868 Serving with Six people
- Preceded by: New district
- Succeeded by: Richard Chaffey Baker
- In office 14 April 1870 – 13 December 1871 Serving with Richard Chaffey Baker
- Preceded by: Philip Santo
- Succeeded by: J A T Lake

Member of South Australian Legislative Council
- In office 3 April 1873 – 27 May 1879

Personal details
- Born: 1816 Great Baddow, Essex, England
- Died: November 5, 1882 (aged 65–66)
- Resting place: Willaston General Cemetery
- Occupation: Pastoralist

Walter Duffield (1816 – 5 November 1882) was a pastoralist and politician in colonial South Australia, Treasurer of South Australia 1865 to 1867.

Duffield was born in Great Baddow, Essex, England, son of William Duffield, a farmer; the solicitor William Ward Duffield was a brother. Walter arrived in South Australia in the William Barras in December 1839. His first occupation was as manager for fellow-passenger Jacob Hagen's estate at Echunga, where his wine was some of the first produced in the colony. He left Echunga to build up the Para Para estate, near Gawler, and produced hams, wines and orchard fruit; he later had 40,000 Merino sheep.

He started business in Gawler as a flour miller ("The Victoria Steam Flour Mill", founded by Stephen King JP) and merchant in September 1847, and, in conjunction with Harrold Brothers as Duffield, Harrold and Company (later Duffield, Harrold and Hurd), owned Weinteriga and Outalpa stations.

Duffield was member for Barossa in the South Australian House of Assembly from 9 March 1857 to 6 April 1868 and from 14 April 1870 to 13 December 1871, and was Treasurer in the John Hart Government from 23 October 1865 to March 1866, and in the Ministry of James Boucaut, which succeeded it, from the latter date till 3 May 1867. Duffield subsequently sat in the South Australian Legislative Council from 3 April 1873 to 27 May 1879, when every four years one third of the Legislative Council was elected by the whole colony as one electorate "The Province".

Duffield died in Gawler on 5 November 1882 and was buried in Willaston General Cemetery.

== Family ==
Walter Duffield married Phoebe Johnstone (c. 1814 – 15 May 1890) on 7 March 1842; their children were:

- Mary Ann Hawkes Duffield (1844– 21 August 1902) married Eli Thomas Humphry in 1880
- Louisa Caroline Duffield (1846– ) married Frank Makin in 1870
- Eleanor Duffield (1848 – 13 May 1934) married J(ohn) Davies Thomas MD (c. 1845 – 30 January 1893) on 10 June 1878. Thomas was for a time partner of H. T. Whittell MD.
- Emily Martha Duffield (1849– ) married Thomas Hopkins Bowen on 2 July 1873 Bowen later acted as attorney for the Duffield estate.
- David Walter Duffield (1851 – 24 January 1922) married Florence Evangeline Kirkpatrick on 15 August 1878
  - Walter Geoffrey Duffield (1879 – 1929) grandson, astronomer buried at Mount Stromlo
