= Samuel Moss Solomon =

English pencil maker and early Jewish settler of Australia (1769–1842)

Samuel Moss Solomon (c. 1769 –13 May 1842) was an English pencil maker and early Jewish settler in Australia. He has thousands of descendants in the country, many of whom achieved a degree of notability.

== Biography ==
Solomon was born in Spitalfields, an area in east London, to Moss Solomon and Julia née Moses. Solomon was a high ranking Freemason. His Masonic apron is preserved at the Grand Lodge in Adelaide, Australia.

He married Elizabeth Moses (c. 1772–c. 1814) and had four sons: Moss Samuel, Emanuel, Vaiben and Phillip, and four daughters: Susan, Hannah, Sarah and Esther. After the death of Elizabeth he married his first cousin Esther Davis (31 December 1774 –13 July 1875), with whom he had another two children, Isaac and Elizabeth "Betsy". Solomon also had a son who went to Jamaica around 1818 and was subsequently disowned.

According to author John Levi, Solomon invented the technique of manufacturing lead pencils, however this is disputed as improbable. On a silver snuffbox from 1833, part of a collection at the Jewish Museum of Australia, is an inscription that reads "Presented to Samuel Moss Solomon the inventor of lead pencils by his London friends."

Solomon made pencils in the Houndsditch area. In 1823, he was falsely accused of trading products without a license, for which he had to defend himself before the Magistrate. His accuser was then charged with "committing an assault on an honest Jew." Just a few years earlier, in 1817, two of his sons, Vaiben and Emanuel (who was 17 at the time), were convicted of being in possession of stolen goods and sentenced to death. They invoked the benefit of clergy commuting their sentences to seven years imprisonment at Van Diemen's Land. They were transported to Sydney on Lady Castlereagh in 1818. After their release in 1824, they were among the first Jewish settlers of the area. They opened a wholesale retail warehouse in 1826 and a wine cellar in 1833 on George Street. In 1833, Solomon joined his sons and immigrated to Australia aboard the Enchantress, arriving on 24 April, opening an auction room near his sons' businesses on George Street.

In 1839, Solomon helped finance the construction of a new synagogue and served on the first Sydney Synagogue committee. He died in Sydney in 1842. Ten years after the death of her husband, Esther moved to the home of her son Isaac in Adelaide, where she died some 23 years later.

In 2012, it was estimated that Solomon had 4,500 descendants. His son Emanuel founded Solomontown, South Australia, and one of his descendants was among those who drafted the Constitution of Australia.

== Notable relatives ==
=== Descendants ===
- Moss Samuel Solomon (1796 –1849)
  - Judah Moss Solomon (1818–1880)
    - Moss Judah Solomon (1843–1933)
    - Benjamin Solomon (1844–1922)
      - Reginald Louis Solomon (1877–1939)
    - Vaiben Louis Solomon (1853–1908)
      - Vaib Solomon (1897–1982)
      - Esther Solomon (1900–1991) married Roland Ellis Jacobs (1891–1981)
        - Sam Jacobs (1920–2011)
  - Elias Solomon (1839–1909)
- Susan Solomon (1799–1885)
  - Philip Benjamin (1848–1924)
    - Zoe Benjamin (1882–1962)
- Emanuel Solomon (1800–1873)
- Vaiben Solomon (c. 1800 –1860)
  - Moss Vaiben Solomon (1837–1915)
    - Edwin Arthur Vaiben Solomon (1877–1963)
      - Lance Solomon (1913–1989)
- Hannah Solomon (b. 1801)
  - Emanuel Cohen (1835–1895)
- Sarah Solomon (c. 1808–1893)
  - Louis Barnett (1865–1946)
  - Bob Joshua (1906–1970)
- Isaac Solomon (1816–1901), businessman
  - Samuel Isaac Solomon (1843–1907), fire captain
  - Elizabeth Solomon (1851–1916) married Abraham Tobias Boas (1842–1923)
    - Isabel Eve Boas (1874–1961)
      - Harold Krantz (1906–1999)
    - Lionel Boas (1875–1949)
    - Isaac Herbert Boas (1878–1955)
    - Harold Boas (1883–1980)

=== Other relatives ===
There were other Jewish Solomon families involved in the settling of Australia, many of whom arrived as penal transports. Some of Solomon's descendents married into other Solomon families.

- Robert Solomon (1931–2024), a member of parliament and geographer. He was a great nephew of Miriam Solomon, a daughter of Abraham and Julia Solomon who had arrived in Australia as steerage. Miriam married Solomon's grandson in 1868.
