= List of descendants of Samuel Moss Solomon =

Australian Jewish family

Samuel Moss Solomon (c. 1769 – 13 May 1842) married Elizabeth Moses (c. 1772–c. 1814) and after her death, he married his first cousin Esther Davis (31 December 1774 – 13 July 1875).

== Descendents ==
=== Moss Samuel ===
Moss Samuel Solomon (1796 – 3? 4? February 1849) married Elizabeth "Betsy" Myers or Meyers (c. 1799–c. 1825). Second marriage to Leah Myers (1807 – 4 January 1871 in Adelaide) c. 1830.

- Judah Moss Solomon (21 December 1818 – 29 August 1880) married cousin Rachel Cohen (1819 – 9 January 1864) on 7 August 1842. She was a daughter of Benjamin Samuel Cohen (1791–1858) of London (see Hannah Solomon below). He married again on 4 September 1867 to Adela Pulver (c. 1844 – 21 September 1875), daughter of Rev. Isaac Pulver (c. 1802–1873) of Hobart. She had two children by him: Elias in 1870 and Rosetta on 8 September 1871, who may not have survived. He was the MP for Adelaide 1858–1860, MLC 1861–1866, mayor of Adelaide 1869–1871, and MP for West Adelaide 1871–1875. Seven of their sixteen children survived childhood, including:

- Moss Judah Solomon (15 June 1843 – 11 February 1933) was born in Moreton Bay, Queensland, married cousin Anna Benjamin (c. 1842 – 24 October 1894) on 13 September 1865; they had 12 children.

- Benjamin Solomon (3 November 1844 – 18 September 1922), known as Colonel Solomon

- Reginald Louis Solomon (1877 – 18 June 1939) was publisher of (Adelaide) Truth newspaper.

- Vaiben Louis Solomon MHA MHR (13 May 1853 – 20 October 1908) was (for seven days) the 21st Premier of South Australia and a member of the first Commonwealth parliament. An AEI student, he married the widow Mary Ann Bridgland (née Wigzell) (c. June 1856 – 7 January 1885) on 6 December 1880 at Darwin (Vaiben had been earlier prohibited by his father from marrying Mary, a daughter of William Danks Wigzell) and mother of Walter Lewis Bridgland (1908–1987). They had one daughter, Mary Danks Solomon; Mary Ann died giving birth to their second. He married again, to Alice Cohen ( – 19 May 1954) of Richmond, Victoria, on 22 July 1896.

- Vaiben Louis "Vaib" Solomon (31 May 1897 – ) married Claribelle Mitchell ( – ) on 31 March 1931. He was a writer, noted for the musical version of Tons of Money for Hugh J. Ward.
- Esther "Ess" Solomon MBE (6 April 1900 – 27 January 1991) married three times: to dentist Hyam John "Boy" Lipman (11 January 1889 – 16 March 1960) on 9 April 1919; (Note: "Ess" Solomon and "Boy" Lipman were notoriously robbed at gunpoint in their own home in 1954; the two culprits were given six years' jail and a whipping.) Harrold Cook; and Sir Roland Ellis "Raoul" Jacobs (28 February 1891 – 28 June 1981) on 30 November 1970. Esther was the first woman elected to the Adelaide City Council and served two terms as deputy mayor. They had three children: Alice Sylvia Lipman (1920– ), Gerald John Lipman (1921–1928) and Rex Lipman, AO ED (26 April 1922 – 4 July 2015).

- Elias Solomon MLA, MHR (2 September 1839 – 23 May 1909) an AEI student in 1855, married Agnes Elizabeth Bickley (c. 1846 – 22 April 1886), daughter of Wallace Bickley. He married a second time, to Elizabeth Stokes (16 September 1868 – 3 December 1898) on 1 May 1887. He lived in Fremantle, Western Australia.

=== Susan ===
Susan Solomon (1799 – 14 June 1885) married Moses (or Moss) Benjamin (c. 1797 – 24 April 1876), lived in Tavistock Street, Adelaide from 1869 to 1876 at least. Susan died at the home of son-in-law Isaac Asher, North Adelaide.

- Philip Benjamin (1848 – September 1924) married Miriam "Minnie" Cohen (26 February 1852 – 17 April 1918) on 10 January 1882. She was a sister of Hon. Justice Henry Emanuel Cohen and Fanny, Lady Benjamin.

- Sophia "Zoe" Benjamin (24 December 1882 – 13 April 1962) childhood educator.

=== Emanuel ===
Emanuel Solomon MLC (1800 – 3 October 1873) married fellow convict Mary Ann Wilson on 6 November 1826. On 12 April 1844 he married Cecilia "Celia" Adelaide Smith ( – 24 July 1852) who died in Sydney; that same year he married a third time, to Catherine Abrahams (1819 – 2 July 1901).

=== Hannah ===
Hannah Solomon (1801– ) married Benjamin Samuel Cohen (1791–1858); they never left England. She has been reported as emigrating to Sydney with her father in April 1833.

- Emanuel Cohen (1835 – 17 November 1895) married cousin Sarah Benjamin (23 January 1839 – 16 June 1920) (see above) on 11 December 1858; lived in Adelaide; she died in Bondi. They had at least five sons and two daughters. Son Lawrence Cohen (24 December 1868 – 1916) married Catherine "Kate" Cohen on 18 May 1862

=== Vaiben ===
Vaiben Solomon (1798? 1802? – 21 June 1860) was transported for larceny to Sydney 1818, married Mary "Sarah" Smith (c. 1809 – 18 May 1879) in 1826. Vaiben and his family are listed in the subscriptions to the building of Sydney's first Synagogue (see the Circular to the Members of the Faith of Israel, 1839, in which Vaiben Solomon is listed on the committee for the building of a New Synagogue, built in 1844 in York Street). Among their children were:

- Elizabeth Solomon (1833 – 4 October 1922) was buried at the Jewish Cemetery, Rookwood. She left her entire estate valued at £31,798 to her sister Hannah.

- Edwin Arthur Vaiben Solomon (20 September 1877 – 2 December 1963), cabinetmaker, married Jessie Elizabeth Black (1874 – 13 May 1951) on 4 March 1907, lived Liverpool NSW, contested his aunt Hannah's will on the grounds of her insanity.

- Lance Vaiben Solomon (27 January 1913 – 1989) married Beryl Naismith. He was a noted painter.

=== Sarah ===
Sarah Solomon (c. 1808 – 14 March 1893) married Michael Joshua (1806 – 9 January 1887). They arrived in Sydney in December 1839. He was a dealer of Hindley Street, lived in Brighton, South Australia at least 1845–1853, later Melbourne, died in Cooktown, Queensland. They had four daughters and two sons. Sir Louis Edward Barnett CMG (1865–1946), professor of surgery in New Zealand, was a grandson. Bob Joshua (1906–1970), federal MP, was a great-grandson of Sarah Solomon and Michael Joshua via their son Saul.

=== Isaac ===
Isaac Solomon (5 April 1816? 1818? – 27 July 1901) arrived in Sydney in 1833, married Isabella Solomon (17 September 1820 – 1 December 1863), daughter of his half-brother Moss Samuel Solomon, at the Bridge Street Synagogue, Sydney, on 15 June 1842. Later had home "Elizabeth Villa" on Kent Terrace, Norwood, South Australia. He had an import business in Adelaide in partnership (dissolved December 1857) with nephew Judah Moss Solomon (1818–1880) at the London end.

- Elizabeth Solomon (1851 – 26 September 1916) married Rev. Abraham Tobias Boas (25 November 1842 – 20 February 1923) on 15 May 1873.

- Isabel (or Isabella) Eve Boas (1874 – ) married David Krantz on 29 March 1905.

- Harold Krantz (1906–1999), architect in Western Australia

- Lionel Tobias Boas (1875 – 16 August 1949) mayor of Subiaco, founder of Young Australia League in Western Australia
- Harold Boas (1883–1980), town planner in Western Australia

== See also ==
- Political families of Australia

== Bibliography ==
- Cowan, Jenny (2016) Meet our Ancestors — Solomon and Associated Families: Volume 1 not as yet accessed
- Levi, John (2013) These Are the Names: Jewish Lives in Australia, 1788-1850 2nd. Ed. Melbourne University Press. ISBN 9780522862294
