= Gall (surname) =

Gall is a surname. Notable people with the name include:

- Gall (Native American leader) (c. 1840 – 1894), Hunkpapa Lakota war leader
- Saint Gall (c. 550 – c. 646), Irish disciple
- Albert Gall (1842–1905), American businessman and politician
- Benny Gall (born 1971), Danish football goalkeeper
- Boris Gáll (born 1994), Slovak football midfielder
- Bruce Gall (born 1956), New Zealand rugby league player
- Carlotta Gall, British journalist and author
- Chris Gall, German jazz pianist and composer
- David A. Gall (1941–2021), American jockey
- David Gall (printer) (1825–1887) South Australian printer and activist
- Endre Gáll (1868–1935), Hungarian jurist
- Ernest Gall (1863–1925), photographer in Adelaide, South Australia
- Felix Gall (born 1998), Austrian cyclist
- France Gall (1947–2018), French singer
- Franz Josef Gall (1758–1828), German neuroanatomist and physiologist
- Franz Gall (general) (1884–1944), German World War II defender of the island fortress Elba
- Greg Gall (born 1965), American death metal drummer
- Hugh Gall (c. 1888–1938), Canadian football player
- Hugues Gall (1940–2024), French opera manager
- James Gall (1808–1895), Scottish clergyman
- John Gall (disambiguation), multiple people
- Joseph G. Gall (1928–2024), American cell biologist
- Karl Gall (1903–1939), Austrian motorcycle racer
- Kevin Gall (born 1982), Welsh footballer
- Ludovic Gall (1900–1944), Romanian long-distance runner
- Mickey Gall (born 1992), American mixed martial arts fighter
- Robert Gall (1918–1990), French lyricist
- Romain Gall (born 1995), French-born American soccer player
- Ruth Gall (1923–2017), Australian chemist
- Sandy Gall (1927–2025), British newsreader and journalist
- Yvonne Gall (1885–1972), French operatic soprano
- Zlatko Gall (born 1954), Croatian journalist

== See also ==
- Le Gall, surname
