= Nimble Ninepence =

The Nimble Ninepence was a variety store in Adelaide in the early days of the colony of South Australia, with a branch store at Kapunda, The shop was destroyed in one of the city's earliest major fires. The name comes from the proverb "Better a nimble ninepence than a slow shilling", implying that the store did more trade by virtue of its lower profit margins.

== History ==
The "Nimble Ninepence" was founded in 1866 on the corner of Waymouth and King William streets, diagonally opposite the Town Hall, by Moss Judah Solomon (1843–1933) and Joseph Samuel Solomon (1846–1940). Although trading as "Solomon Cousins", their relationship was more like uncle and nephew, Joseph being Emanuel Solomon's eldest son and Moss (or Moses) a grandson of Moss Samuel Solomon (1796–1849), Emanuel's eldest brother.

The expression "nimble ninepence" had been used by Emanuel Solomon in advertising a store he opened in February 1845, carrying a wide range of readily-sold commodities on behalf of a range of wholesalers and manufacturers, advertising that their markup was 2½ per cent., and the proceeds handed over to the vendors the day after the sale.

Unlike the store founded by Emanuel Solomon, the "Solomon Cousins" imported their stock direct from the manufacturers, and did not advertise their markup, only that they were 20% cheaper than their competitors. In 1866 Emanuel Solomon purchased the building being rented for the store, and erected a new one in its place, measuring 90 by 32 feet (27.4 m × 9.8 m).

The store was at the centre of a notorious legal case, where an employee, who had been sacked for theft, sued Moss Samuel Solomon for trespass, malicious prosecution, false imprisonment, and dismissal without proper notice, all through vindictiveness because he, Louis Meyers, had married a gentile. Solomon was however able to prove that Meyers had sold to an associate, goods of a certain type at the price of a lower class, as wedding gifts to himself, and making false entries in the ledger. He lost the action.

The partnership was dissolved in September 1871, and the shop taken over by Joseph S. Solomon, Emanuel Solomon being the owner of both the business and building.

In the early evening of Tuesday 31 October 1871, shortly after the proprietor left the building, smoke was seen to be issuing from the Nimble Ninepence; the brigade was called, and the mayor, who was passing by, sent for M. J. Solomon. The building was soon ablaze, hastened perhaps by exploding cans of gunpowder, as was the conjoined drapery store, also owned by Solomon, where another cask of gunpowder was stored, perhaps to circumvent the law regulating the quantity permitted on the premises. The manager of David Gall's printery next door saved much valuable material, and the fire brigade saved the adjacent buildings from serious damage. This followed D & W Murray's 1868 fire as one of the earliest in the city.

At the inquest it was found that the gas pipes to both shops had been turned off, no lamps had been lit, and no-one had been smoking, so an open verdict was reached. Surprisingly, none of the drums of kerosine had been affected. Cash and all the books of account had been conserved in the fireproof safe. No mention has yet been found of the fate of the Kapunda shop, notably one of V. L. Solomon's first employers.

The insurance company paid up promptly, and the owners did not quibble with their payout, reportedly saying "Better a nimble ninepence than a slow shilling".

The building was replaced with a suite of offices designated "Central Chambers", opened January 1873. E. J. Woods was the architect.
