= David Gall =

David Gall may refer to:

- David A. Gall (1941–2021), American jockey
- David Gall (printer) (1825–1887) South Australian printer and activist
