= Moss Judah Solomon =

Moss Judah Solomon (15 June 1843 – 11 February 1933), was a businessman in the British colony and, later in South Australia. He was a prominent member of Adelaide's Hebrew congregation.

== History ==
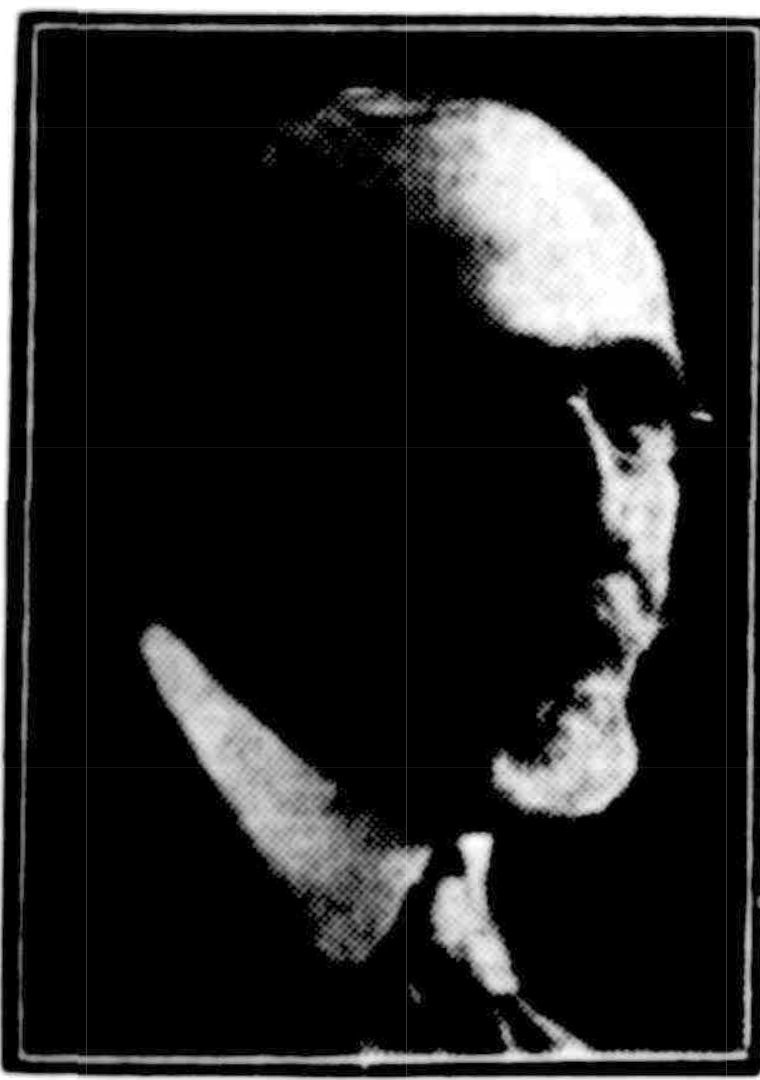
Moss Judah Solomon

Solomon was born in Brisbane, Australia, the eldest son of Judah Moss Solomon, Government Auctioneer of the colony of Queensland, later Mayor of Adelaide and a member of both houses of parliament of South Australia. In 1846 the family sailed to South Australia in the brig Dorset, owned by his uncle Emanuel Solomon, and settled in a house on Stephens Place, later the site of John Lorenzo Young's school. In February 1854 J. M. Solomon took his family to England aboard the steamer Australia, to act as buyer for his brothers Vaiben and Emanuel. The Australia, which was carrying a valuable cargo of gold bullion, ran aground on a reef off Cape Town, so the passengers took to the boats, and were picked up by the steamer Royal Shepherdess, which was following, also heavily laden with bullion. The Australia turned out to have suffered no serious damage, so was able to resume her voyage and arrived in London with no further mishap. While in England, Solomon and his brother Benjamin Solomon attended London College.

In 1858 J. M. Solomon returned to Adelaide, and resumed his business activities, enrolling the boys at St Peter's College. At age 17 Solomon joined his father's auction house, and updated the system of departmental bookkeeping then being used. He married and had five children, living at "Palmerston Villa" on Barton Terrace east.

In 1873 he left Adelaide and his family for the Northern Territory, which was enjoying a surge of business activity, led by the discovery of gold. He established an auctioneering business in Darwin. Solomon was elected to the first district council. He established trade connections with Batavia and Surabaya, and returned to Adelaide on a P&O ship, narrowly avoiding being carried on the Gothenburg, which was tragically wrecked in 24 February 1875.

Back in Adelaide, Solomon returned to auctioneering, trading chiefly in sugar and molasses from Mauritius, the subject of see-sawing tariffs between the colonies of Queensland and New South Wales, which intensified after Federation.

He married a second time in 1895, to Fanny Bennett (daughter of Gabriel Bennett, she founded the Jewish Ladies' Guild in 1902, died in 1927).

He was partner in firm of Solomon Cousins (aka Nimble Ninepence) of King William Street and Kapunda with his "uncle" Joseph Samuel Solomon (1846–1940).

He died at his home, "Palmerston", at 226 Wellington Square, North Adelaide.

== Other interests ==
Solomon was involved in the Literary Societies movement, then popular with young men aspiring for political favours, and its associated Model Parliament. mention Dr Jefferis? He was active in amateur theatre, a member of the Garrick amateur theatrical company.

He was a zealous worker for the Hebrew congregation; appointed secretary, later president, a post he held for 33 years all told, up to the year of his death.

He succeeded Sir Charles Goode as president of the North Adelaide Institute, and was a devotee of the game of chess, president of Bishop's Chess Club, and vice-president of the Adelaide Chess Club.

== Family ==
Mr. Solomon was married twice. His second wife died in June 1927. He had 12 children. Four sons served in the Great War. Moss Judah Solomon (15 June 1843 – 11 February 1933) was born in Moreton Bay, Queensland, had residence "Palmerston" 226 Wellington Square, North Adelaide. He married cousin Anna Benjamin (c. 1842 – 24 October 1894) on 13 September 1865; they had 12 children, lived at "Palmerston" and "Palmerston Villa" on Barton Terrace east. He married a second time, to Fanny Bennett (daughter of Gabriel Bennett, she founded the Jewish Ladies' Guild in 1902, died in 1927) in 1895. He was partner in firm of Solomon Cousins (aka Nimble Ninepence) of King William Street and Kapunda with his "uncle" Joseph Samuel Solomon (1846–1940). His children included:

- Rachel Adelaide "Rae" Solomon (9 September 1866 – 6 July 1945) married Edgar L. Lawrence (c. 1865 – 24 May 1933) on 28 October 1891. Edgar was Perth manager for WD & HO Wills and son of L. P. Lawrence.
- Susan Selina "Susie" Solomon (10 February 1868 – 10 December 1963) graduated BSc in 1890
- J(udah) Moss Solomon BA LLB (12 April 1869 – 30 March 1949) married Elizabeth Sarah "Beth" or "Lizzie" Barnard (1875 – 2 January 1943) on 24 June 1896. He was a trooper with the 2nd NSW Mounted Rifles, served in the Boer War, was awarded the Queen's South Africa Medal. He was Hon. sec. of Lady Kintore Cottages, and solicitor of King William Street, Adelaide from 1893 to 1901.

Around 1907 Solomon moved to Subiaco, Western Australia, with a home "Braemar" at Hammersley Road. He was foundation member and first secretary of Kitchener Park Bowls Club, struck off legal rolls for dishonest conduct, returned to Adelaide? c. February 1914, then in Sydney as managing clerk for lawyer Harris?, E. R. Abigail, A. J. McLachlan & Co., later McLachlan, Westgarth & Co. Elizabeth Barnard was a daughter of racing official Simeon Barnard.
Similarity of their names led to ill-feeling between himself and Judah Moss Solomon BA LLB (1857–1925), who adopted the surname Solomon-Senior (see below).

- Walter Samuel Solomon (14 August 1877 – 14 December 1955) married Alice Forshaw (c. 1881 – 18 September 1947); fought as Trooper in Boer War, convert from Judaism to Salvation Army; served as (Brigadier) chaplain in WWII at age 65. awarded Australian Efficiency Decoration in 1947.
