= Isaac Herbert Boas =

Australian botanist (1878–1955)

Isaac Herbert Boas (20 October 1878 – 16 October 1955) was an Australian chemist, geologist and forester.

== Early life, education and career ==
Boas was born in Adelaide in the then self-governing colony of South Australia and educated at the University of Adelaide. He was later a lecturer at the University of Western Australia where he was awarded a Master of Science degree.

Boas was as appointed to the Council for Scientific and Industrial Research in 1928.

During World War 2, Boas was a member of the Department of Supply and Development.

== Personal life and death ==
Isaac Herbert Boas was the son of rabbi Abraham Tobias Boas, and the brother of Western Australian political and sporting person Lionel Boas.

Boas died in Hawthorn, Victoria in 1955.
