= Vaiben Solomon =

Pastoralist of New South Wales (1798–1860)

Vaiben Solomon (abt 1800 – 21 June 1860) was a Jewish-English convict who, with his brother Emanuel, was transported for larceny to New South Wales in 1818. Despite further brushes with the law, Solomon and his brother seized business opportunities and became prosperous Sydney merchants. The brothers were later joined by more of their siblings, and became patriarchs of a family line that would go on to make its mark on Australian business and politics, particularly in New South Wales and South Australia.

== Early life and transportation ==
Vaiben was born in 1798, the son of Samuel Moss Solomon, a London pencil maker.

On the evening of 16 October 1816, Vaiben and his brother Emanuel Solomon were arrested at a boarding house in Northallerton, Yorkshire. They were charge with breaking and entering and stealing clothing from the house of Thomas Prest. They were committed for trial at the Durham Assizes, which took place on 4 August 1817. They were found guilty of larceny and sentenced to transportation for seven years.

The brothers were transported to Australia on the Lady Castlereagh in mid-December 1817. The ship first arrived at Port Jackson on 30 April 1818, where 39 prisoners were unloaded and the remaining 261, including the Solomon brothers, were taken to Van Diemens Land.

The two brothers did not prove to be model prisoners and, after committing a further theft of clothes, they were sentenced on 3 March 1821 to the penal settlement at Newcastle, New South Wales for three years. The brothers received their certificates of release in August 1824.

== Career ==
By 1826, Vaiben had gone into business. In July 1826, he wrote to the authorities to ask that the convict David Myers be assigned to him at his business in King Street, Sydney.

By 1828, Vaiben and Emanuel were in business at 74 George Street as general merchants and auctioneers. Their father joined them in 1833. The brothers continued in partnership for over ten years, for a time acting as agents for the ship Nereus. Emanuel moved to Adelaide and acted as agents for both brothers. The pair owned the brig Dorset, which ferried goods and passengers between the two cities. They built the Queen's Theatre, Adelaide in 1840, however, the theatre, folded after a year. As trade between the two colonies dried up and, with increased competition from rival brig Emma, relations between the two brothers became strained. Emanuel accusing Vaiben of insufficient zeal and lack of communication. In 1844, Emanuel made his way to Sydney and the brothers dissolved their partnership. Emanuel went into business with their nephew, Judah Moss Solomon as agents and auctioneers, and become very wealthy.

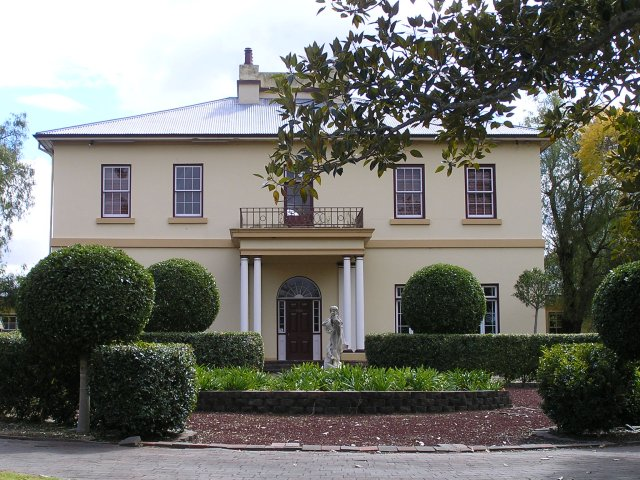
Horningsea Park, restored and now heritage-listed

While Vaiben was not as prosperous, he was still significantly wealthy. During his life, Vaiben accumulated a considerable portfolio of properties. In 1831, Vaiben bought into the Jamieson subdivision and, in 1836, he opened a tailoring establishment in George Street and purchased 13 acres (5.3 ha) of land in Brighton.

Together with his sons David, Abraham and Saul, they formed the partnership "V. Solomon and Sons". In 1855, they purchased a 500 acres (200 ha) estate "Horningsea", near Liverpool, New South Wales, with a grand but somewhat dilapidated mansion, which they renamed Horningsea Park. Vaiben and his family lived at Horningsea Park and ran the farm.

Vaiben withdrew from the partnership with his sons in April 1857. His sons continued as D., A. & S. Solomon and subsequently left the district in 1872.

== Personal life ==
Solomon married Mary "Sarah" Smith (c. 1809 – 18 May 1879) in 1826. Among their children was Hannah Alexandra Solomon (c. 1840–1929), who married Louis Alexander, a man some 30 years her junior. She divorced him in 1907 due to his infidelity, but he was able to sue her for continuation of his £200 p.a. allowance. Wealthy and eccentric, her £80,000 will ($10–20 million in today's money) was contested by nephew Edwin Solomon and widely (and sensationally) reported.

Solomon's grandson, Lance Vaiben Solomon was a noted painter. Solomon's nephew and Emanuel's son, Vaiben Louis Solomon, became Premier of South Australia.

== Death ==
Solomon died at his home at Horningsea Park on 21 June 1860. He was survived by his wife.

== Legacy ==
Solomon and his family contributed to the building of the first synagogue in Sydney.

== Bibliography ==
- Solomon, David (November 2007). The crime and punishment of Emanuel and Vaiben Solomon.
- Richards, E. S. (1975) The fall and rise of the brothers Solomon Journal of Proceedings of the Australian Jewish History Society, Vol VIII, Part 2, pp. 1–28.
- Levi, J. S. and Bergman, G. F. J. (1974) Australian genesis – Jewish convicts and settlers 1778–1850 London: Robert Hale and Company, 360 pp.
- Levi, J. S. (1976) The forefathers – a dictionary of biography of the Jews of Australia (1788–1830)
