= Massada College, Adelaide =

Massada College
- Glenside, Adelaide; South Australia; Australia

Information
- Type: Independent co-educational early learning and primary day school
- Religious affiliation: Modern Orthodox Judaism
- Established: 1976; 50 years ago
- Closed: 2011
- Grades: Kindergarten - Grade 7
- Campus type: Suburban
- Website: massadacollege.tripod.com

For the Sydney Jewish Day School, see Masada College

Massada College was an independent Modern Orthodox Jewish co-educational early learning and primary day school, located in Glenside in Adelaide, South Australia. It shared a suburban campus with Adelaide Hebrew Congregation. The school served students from Orthodox and Progressive Jewish backgrounds, as well as non-Jewish students. The school opened in 1976 and closed in 2011. It was the only Jewish school in South Australia.

== History ==
Victor Ades Memorial Kindergarten, a Jewish kindergarten, was founded in 1972 and later co-existed with Massada on the same campus. Massada was founded in 1976, when Adelaide's Jewish population was around 2, 000. The school began with an enrollment of 3 students and by 1982 had 56 students and 25 in Victor Ades. The school and kindergarten were based located in Walkerville, before relocating to a purpose-built campus with Adelaide Hebrew Congregation in Glenside in 1990. The school had hoped to expand with a high school within three years of their move to Glenside.

The school received financial support from a number of benefactors over the years, such as Rabbi Joseph Gutnick. In 1994, the school launched a campaign to raise $1 million and overcome its bank debt. Yehuda Avner, Israeli ambassador to Australia, delivered the keynote address for the school's 18th anniversary, held at the Hilton Hotel in Adelaide. At this time, a third of students came from the former Soviet Union.

In 1996, the school expanded by opening a second stream of classes. At the time, the school was becoming increasingly popular with non-Jewish students, who accounted for 30% of all enrollments. In the same year, South Australia's governor, Roma Mitchell and Shmuel Moyal, Israel's ambassador to Australia, attended the launch of the school's fundraising appeal. In 1996, Massada also became the first Jewish school in the world to begin offering the International Baccalaureate, by offering the IB Middle Years Programme.

In 1998, the Australian Jewish pianist David Helfgott visited the school and performed. Helfgott was the subject of the 1996 film Shine, in which several Massada College students appeared as extras. The school's principal, Ronnie Figdor, has also served as advisor on the film for its Jewish content.

The school reached a point of financial crisis in 1998, but received support from the National Bank of Australia. By the time of the school's closure in 2011, Adelaide's Jewish population had halved in size since the school was founded. The school went into voluntary administration.

Residential redevelopment has been proposed for the school site and former synagogue.

== See also ==
- Adelaide Holocaust Museum and Andrew Steiner Education Centre
- History of the Jews in Australia
