= Horningsea Park =

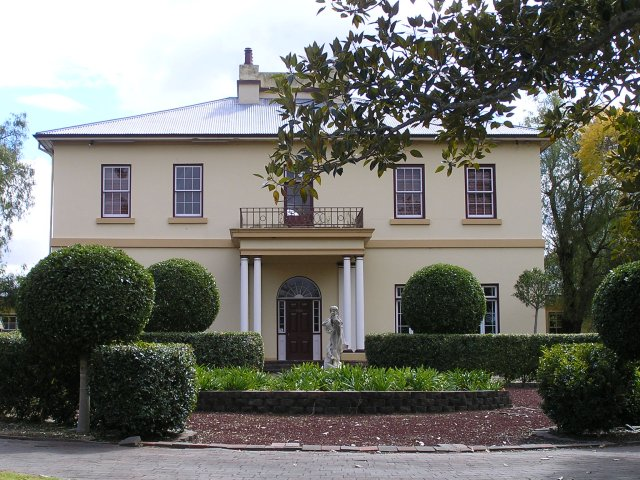

- Location within New South Wales Location within Australia
- 33.9485°S 150.8462°E
- Location: Camden Valley Way, Horningsea Park, City of Liverpool, New South Wales, Australia

History
- Built: 1830–1839

Site notes
- Architect: Joshua John Moore
- Owner: Liverpool City Council

New South Wales Heritage Register
- Official name: Horningsea Park
- Type: state heritage (built)
- Designated: 2 April 1999
- Reference no.: 255
- Type: House
- Category: Residential buildings (private)

Horningsea Park is a heritage-listed homestead at Camden Valley Way, Horningsea Park, New South Wales, a suburb of Sydney, Australia. It was designed by Joshua John Moore and built from 1830 to 1839. The property is owned by Liverpool City Council. It was added to the New South Wales State Heritage Register on 2 April 1999.

== History ==
Horningsea Park was one of Governor Lachlan Macquarie's large pastoral grants made following the establishment of Liverpool in the 1810s. The 500-acre property was granted to Lieutenant Joshua John Moore in 1819. The grant was conditional on 50 acres being cultivated within five years. Moore was one of the few early settlers allowed to pass through the Cowpastures with cattle in 1821 to his land at Baw Baw. He was the first pastoralist to occupy land on the present site of Canberra and his is the first written mention of that name. In the 1840s Polish explorer and discoverer of Mount Kosciuszko, Paweł Strzelecki lived at Horningsea Park. The place thus has strong links with early exploration beyond the Cumberland Plain, as well as with the early movement of the Australian economy from an agricultural to a pastoral base.

Moore was a Lieutenant in the 14th Regiment of Foot and a Battle of Waterloo veteran. He arrived in NSW in 1816 and was appointed Clerk to the Judge Advocate. Horningsea Park was part of an integrated area of large pastoral grants (mainly to military or civil officers or wealthy free settlers) which stretched from Liverpool to the Nepean River. Horningsea Park escaped the subdivision of the area which took place in the 1880s boom.

Moore's first residence on Horningsea Park was Cumberland Cottage, built in the 1820s. There were five employees listed as working on the property in the 1828 census: a woman servant, a boot maker, a gardener and two labourers. As well as indicating the presence of accommodation on the property at the time, a woman servant would imply a homestead.

The present Horningsea House was built in the 1830s, by 1839 using convict labour. An unreferenced map (1882) described by Keating shows the house, grand driveway, and an assemblage of outbuildings around the house. The Moore family sold Horningsea in 1855 to clear debts from the 1840s depression to members of the Solomon family, who gave the house its current name.

Subdivision of the original 500 acre grant took place in the 1880s.

The house was described in 1907 as having 13 rooms and a detached kitchen and wash house at the rear. There was a large stable and buildings associated with dairying and grazing.

The house underwent extensive renovations in the 1930s by Alfred Emil Schoeffel and his wife Daisy Mildred Pearse. The cellars were filled in, the (front) verandah was replaced with the present porch, the eastern part of the house was reconstructed, and some outbuildings were demolished. The Schoeffels sold Horningsea Park in the early 1950s.

In 1947 the house and a sixty-acre block were separated from the remaining (612 acres of) land, which was subdivided in 1949. The 60-acre house block was later expanded to 90 acres and was bought by Lucile and Michael Polya, dairy farmers. Following the loss of its pastoral context in the 1950s, by 1960 the holding was reduced to 22 acres (9 hectares), the size and shape it remains today. It was used as a residence until c. 1974 when the Polyas sold the property. It had reached a derelict state by the 1970s.

The house was classified by the National Trust of Australia in 1976, when it was also saved from demolition after intervention from the Minister for Planning and Liverpool Council. After many changes in ownership the house and 22 acres came into possession of a British-based company who proposed development of the site for a caravan park. Demolition had already started when a preservation order was placed over the property, but not before vandals stripped its internal fittings including cedar doors, windows and shutters, a cedar staircase and all the marble mantelpieces. The owners erected a new roof and boarded up windows and doors. The property was put up for sale in 1980.

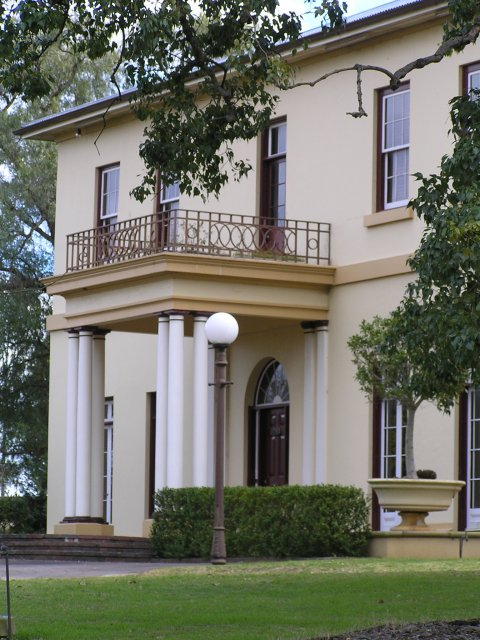
Front detail

The house was stabilised, progressively reconstructed (from 1982) and what was the gutted shell was extensively renovated following its recognition as a heritage item and making of a permanent conservation order in 1983.

At that time some of the outbuildings were still standing and the work included demolition of a single-storey service wing on the northern side of the house. These were visible in photographs taken prior to the reconstruction in the early 1980s. In 1991 the Liverpool Heritage Study referred to sandstone and pressed-brick footings associated with former outbuildings. Footings of outbuildings were visible in 1991. As these footings were described as being of "machine-made bricks", the structures were most likely built during the twentieth century.

The house today is a product of the extensive reconstruction it underwent in the early 1980s, c. 1982. The floors and joinery are new, photographs of that time showing a shell. Usual areas of archaeological potential such as underfloor spaces were removed or disturbed at this time. For intents and purposes the house, except for its southern, eastern and western walls and the internal load-bearing walls, was built c. 1982. The cellars date to the house's original construction. Of the original property the curtilage is now quite small. The sites of most of the property's work buildings are likely to be under the neighbouring housing subdivision. The outbuildings nearest to the house, of which the detached kitchen and wash house are specifically referred to, are likely to have been disturbed by the reconstruction works and subsequent landscaping. A cistern stands close to the house's north-west corner. It has been converted into a wine cellar.

Following its reconstruction, it was used as the office of a land company managing an adjacent residential redevelopment, but returned to residential use after being sold in 1999. It was heavily renovated in 2004, with two additional wings added to the building in a design sympathetic to the heritage features. In August 2018, it was advertised for sale as either a residence or commercial premises.

== Description ==
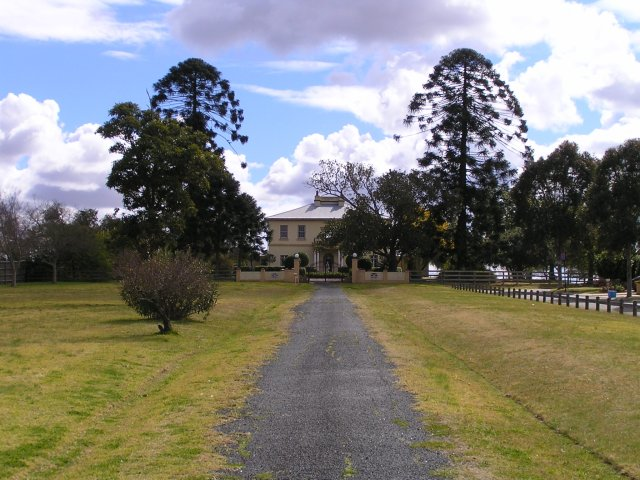
Long driveway

Horningsea Park is a two-storey brick/rubble and stucco Georgian style house set in the remains of its former estate, still retaining the long entrance driveway from the Hume Highway. The house has been restored and reconstructed from a semi-ruinous condition, having been severely damaged in the 1970s by part-demolition.

== Heritage listing ==
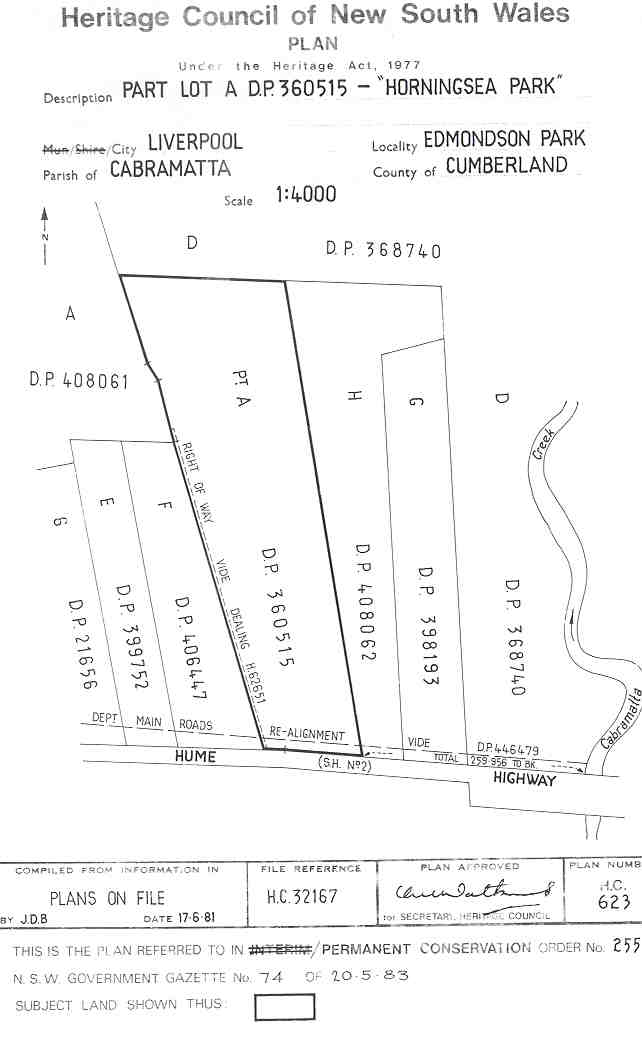
Heritage boundaries

The intact survival of Horningsea Park for so long as a large rural entity is significant testimony to its viability as a pastoral and dairying assemblage. In relation to its setting within the estate, the house retains an ability to demonstrate socially and historically significant concepts about Australian colonial and post-colonial life. The place has strong links with early exploration beyond the Cumberland Plain, as well as with the early movement of the Australian economy from an agricultural to a pastoral base. A fine early Georgian homestead, with visual evidence of its former estate and surrounded by trees some of which are from the original garden.

Horningsea Park was listed on the New South Wales State Heritage Register on 2 April 1999.
