= Lillian Daphne de Lissa =

Australian early childhood educator and educational theorist (1885–1967)

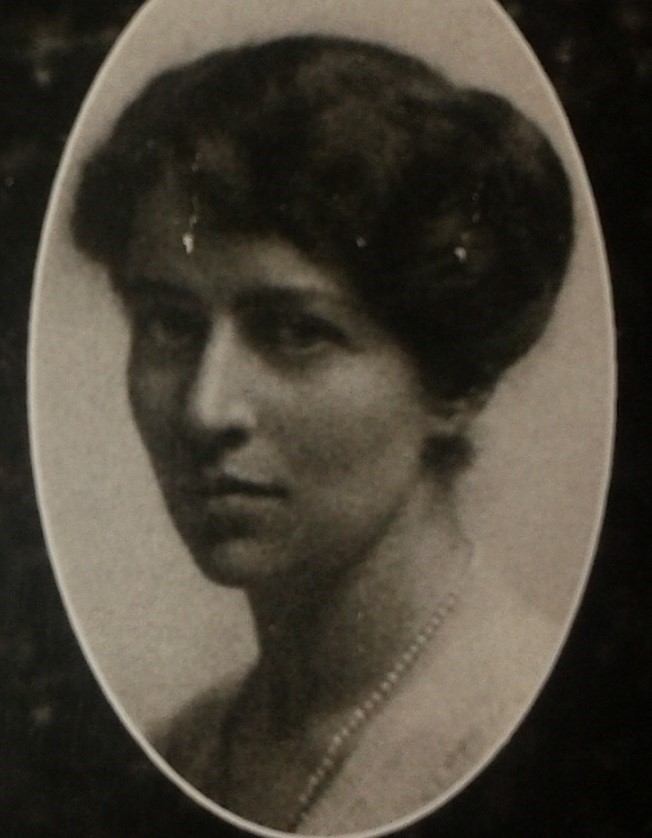
- Born: 25 October 1885; Darlinghurst
- Died: 16 October 1967 (aged 81); Dorking
- Occupation: Pedagogue, early childhood educator

Lillian Daphne de Lissa (25 October 1885 – 1967) was an early childhood educator and educational theorist in Adelaide, South Australia and the United Kingdom in the twentieth century. She was head hunted to lead Gipsy Hill College in South London, a key part of Kingston University, that spread the ideas of Montessori education and the Dalton Plan.

== Early life and education ==
Lillian Daphne de Lissa was born in Darlinghurst on 25 October 1885, the sixth child of Montague de Lissa, a merchant, and Julia, née Joseph, a Jewish family.

She was educated at Riviere College, Woollahra, in 1891 passing the Junior University Examination in seven subjects, then in 1894 passed the Senior examination in eight subjects, matriculating six months later with first class honours in French and German. She was awarded a Walker Exhibition, enabling her to enrol in an arts degree course at the Women's Institute.

She had ambitions for a career in music, but was inspired by the transformation of the slums by the Woolloomooloo Free Kindergarten and decided to pursue studies in early childhood education.

In 1902, de Lissa began studying at the Sydney Kindergarten Teachers College, Sydney where she was influenced by the work and philosophies of the principal Frances Newton who had brought new ideas from Chicago.

Commencing work as a Kindergarten director at Ashfield free Kindergarten in 1905, de Lissa then enrolled in a teacher training course in order to have a broader influence on early childhood education.

== Career ==
In 1905, de Lissa accompanied Frances Newton on a trip to Adelaide, at the invitation of Bertram Hawker, to share their philosophies of early childhood education. The tour led to the formation of the Kindergarten Union of South Australia on 26 September 1905 at a public meeting. The Union sought to establish Free Kindergartens in the poorer parts of the city.

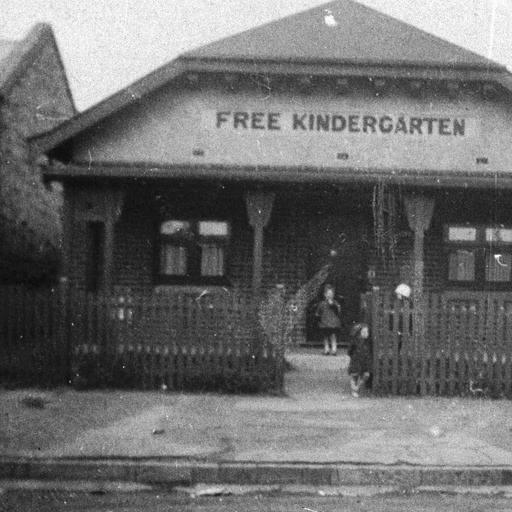
Franklin Street Free Kindergarten, in Adelaide 1917

In 1906, de Lissa became the founding director of Adelaide's first free kindergarten, which was established at 214 Franklin Street. She used teaching methods based on the work of Friedrich Fröbel, a German educator who is considered one of the founders of kindergarten education.

The Kindergarten Teachers College was founded in Adelaide in 1907 and de Lissa was appointed its founding Principal. She visited Perth in 1911, and inspired there the formation of the Kindergarten Union of Western Australia.

In 1913, de Lissa travelled to Europe to conduct a study tour. She was away from Adelaide for two years. She travelled to Rome to gain a diploma qualification in Montessori education. de Lissa gave a keynote address at the second Conference of the New Ideals in Education (i.e. Montessori) conference in East Runton near Cromer in 1914. Her travels throughout Europe allowed her to complete a report about the state of education in European countries for the South Australian Government. On her return to Adelaide in 1915, de Lissa introduced Montessori methods to both kindergartens and the teacher training college and gave public lectures about the methods. One of the students she inspired with Montessori ideas was Doris Anne Beeston. Belle Rennie had organised the first Conference of the New Ideals in Education in 1912 and she was an enthusiast for the Montessori Method. A second Conference of the New Ideals in Education was organised at Runton near Cromer in 1914 and it was agreed that they needed to establish a new training facility where teachers could learn about Montessori's approach. Rennie took the lead on the idea and she persuaded the Board of Education to give accreditation to her new Gipsy Hill College. Rennie needed a new principal for the college and she approached de Lissa who had been a keynote speaker at her Runton conference.

=== England ===
In 1917 de Lissa left Adelaide for England. The Mail newspaper reports that she was invited to take up position of Principal of the Montessori Training College in London. In 1917, she became foundation Principal of the Gipsy Hill Training College in Surrey, England, a residential college for nursery school teachers. This led to a role in the formation of the Nursery School Association of Great Britain and Northern Ireland in 1923. She served as principal of the Gipsy Hill Teachers College for 29 years. She published several books that were well-regarded including Life in the Nursery School (1939) and Life in the Nursery School and in Early Babyhood (1949).

=== Later travels ===
De Lissa was invited on a lecture tour of the United States for six months in 1943, at the invitation of organisations including the Child Study Association of America and the Progressive Education Association.

In 1955, de Lissa returned to Adelaide for the Kindergarten Union of South Australia's Golden Jubilee.

== Death and legacy ==
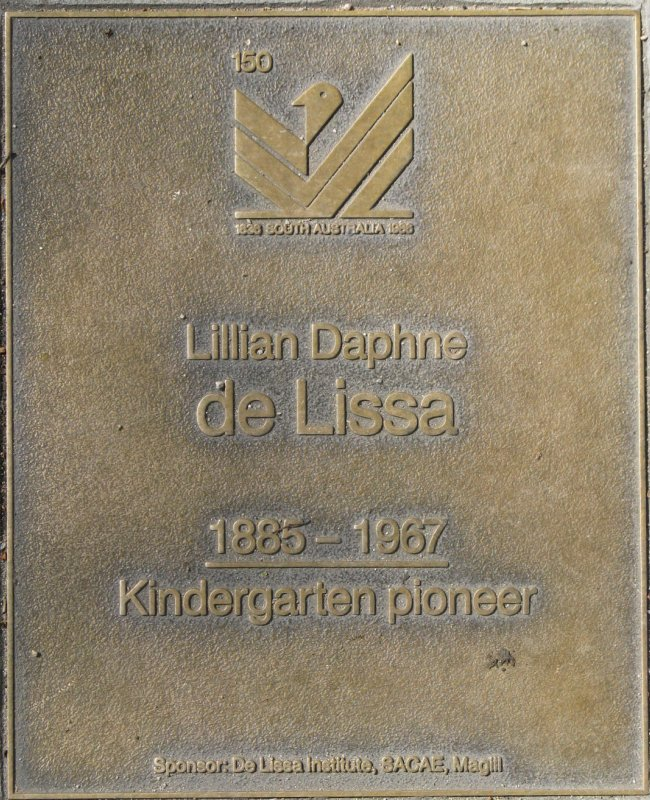
Plaque honoring de Lissa on the Jubilee 150 Commemorative Walkway in Adelaide.

De Lissa died in 1967 in Dorking, Surrey, England.

The de Lissa Institute of Early Childhood and Family Studies at the Magill campus of the University of South Australia is named for Lillian de Lissa, and the Lillian de Lissa Scholarship was established to honour her memory.

The de Lissa Association of Early Childhood Graduates (University of South Australia) previously known as the Kindergarten Club was established in 1911. When the Association was disassociated in 2011 they donated their records to the University of South Australia Library to establish the de Lissa Association Collection.

A portrait of de Lissa by artist Gilbert Spencer was presented by Gipsy Hill Training College to the Royal Academy, sometime before 1954.
