= Adelaide Hebrew Congregation =

Modern Orthodox synagogue in South Australia

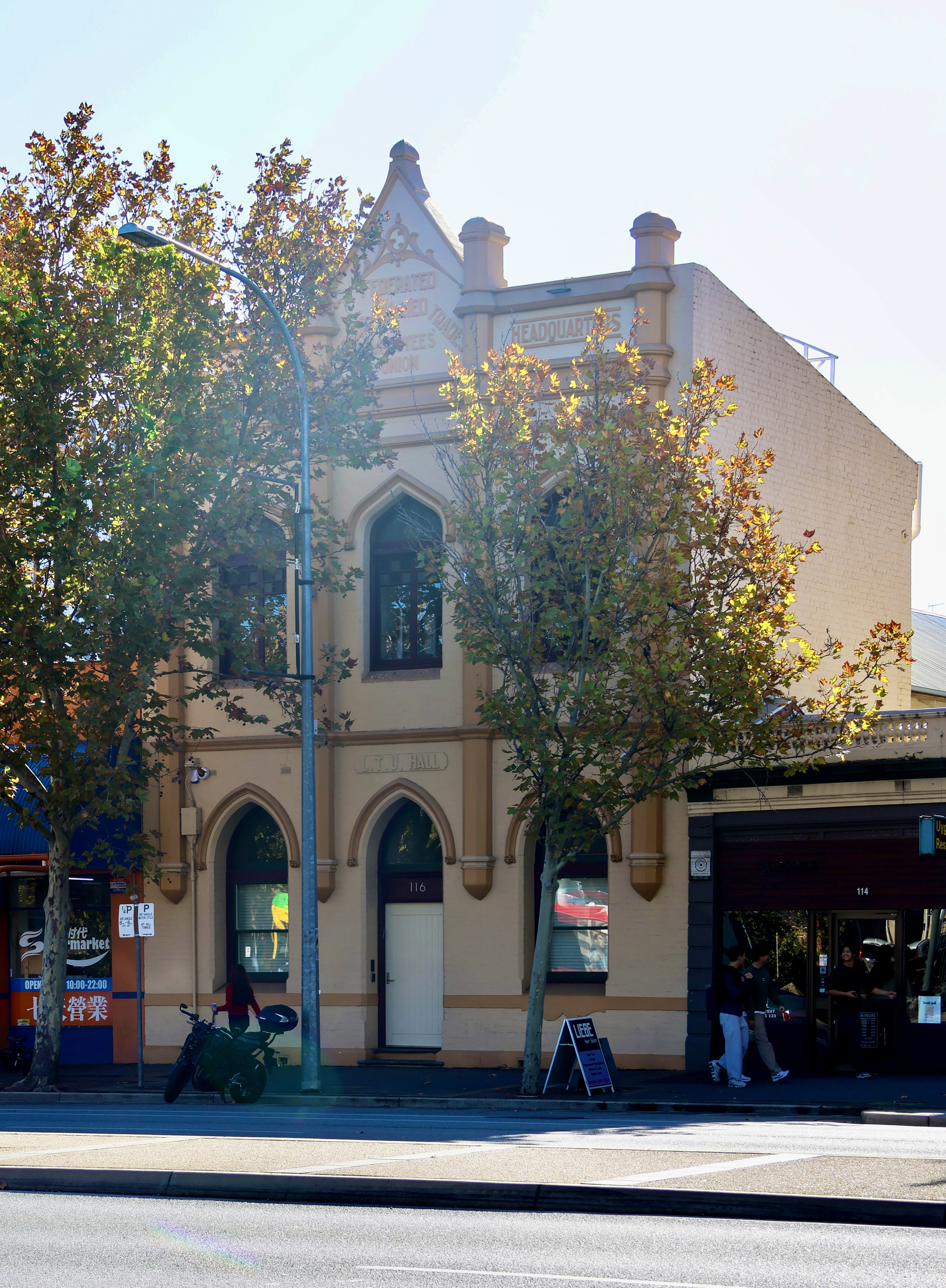
- The building in 2026

Religion
- Affiliation: Modern Orthodox Judaism
- Rite: Nusach Ashkenaz
- Ecclesiastical or organizational status: Synagogue
- Status: Active

Location
- Location: Grote Street, Adelaide, South Australia
- Country: Australia
- Interactive map of Adelaide Hebrew Congregation
- Coordinates: 34°55′43″S 138°35′42″E

Architecture
- Architects: Edmund Wright, Edward Woods and Edward Hamilton (second building); Christopher Arthur Smith (second synagogue remodelling)
- Type: Synagogue architecture
- Style: Egyptian Revival (first synagogue); Italian Renaissance (second synagogue); Art Deco (second synagogue remodelling)
- Completed: 1850 (first synagogue); 1870 (second synagogue); 1990 (Glenside)

Website
- adelaidehebrew.com

The Adelaide Hebrew Congregation is a Modern Orthodox synagogue and congregation in Adelaide, in South Australia. The congregation was first established in 1848, and the synagogue was completed in 1850. A larger synagogue building was constructed in 1870 in the CBD. In 1990, the congregation relocated to a new purpose-built synagogue in Glenside, where it shared a campus with the Jewish Day School, Massada College. The school closed in 2011 and the synagogue has recently returned to a new location on Grote Street in the CBD.

== History ==
Emanuel Solomon and John Lazar were among the founders of the congregation. The congregation's first building, completed in 1850, was built in the Egyptian Revival style. Judah Moss Solomon, Mayor of Adelaide, was the congregation's first president. Subsequent presidents included Adelaide mayor, Lewis Cohen. As the congregation expanded, a larger building, built in the Italian Renaissance style, was built adjacent to the original synagogue in 1870. Abraham Tobias Boas arrived the same year and served as the congregation's first rabbi. The synagogue was remodelled by architect Christopher Arthur Smith in 1938, and given an Art Deco cement facade.

In 1988, the congregation's president, Arnold Erlanger announced plans for the congregation to relocate from Rundle Street in the CBD: "...the present synagogue can no longer meet the needs of our dynamic and expanding community. The building is old and in desperate need of repair. Erlanger also said that a new site should include Massada College. The congregation purchased 1.2 hectares of land adjacent to the Glenside Hospital from the Government of South Australia for $1.1 million and with an estimated cost of $3.2 million for the project. The new synagogue was designed to accommodate 400 worshippers, more than the 275 of the Rundle Street location. An increasing Jewish population driven by Jewish emigration from South Africa and the Soviet Union were also factors in the decision. In 1990, the synagogue was daubed with anti-semitic graffiti following the arrest of Ivan Polyukhovich in Adelaide. The new campus, encompassing the AHC and Massada College was officially opened by Bill Hayden, governor-general of Australia on 22 July 1990. The campus which came to a total cost of $5 million was named the Nathan and Miriam Solomon Centre after the parents of the main benefactor, Myer Solomon. An office was also opened on site to handle work for United Israel Appeal, Women's International Zionist Organization and State Zionist Council and Habonim Dror.

In 2023, it was announced that the Congregation had purchased a new home on Grote Street, in Adelaide's CBD. This came after failed efforts to colocate with the city's Progressive Jewish synagogue, Beit Shalom. The decision to leave Glenside was made as that building was designed to meet the needs of a larger congregation at the time. The property the congregation purchased was built in 1915 as a Seventh-day Adventist Mission Hall and subsequently housed the Federated Liquor and Allied Industries Employees' Union of Australia and then a performing arts venue.

== Gallery ==
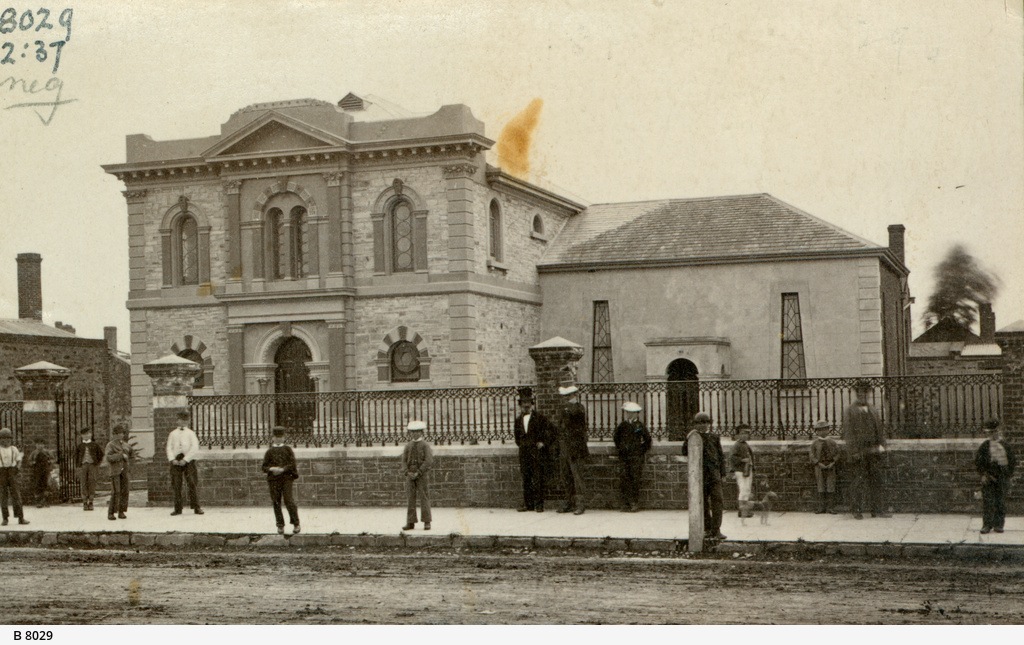
Adelaide Hebrew Congregation off Rundle Street, north side in Synagogue Place, 1871

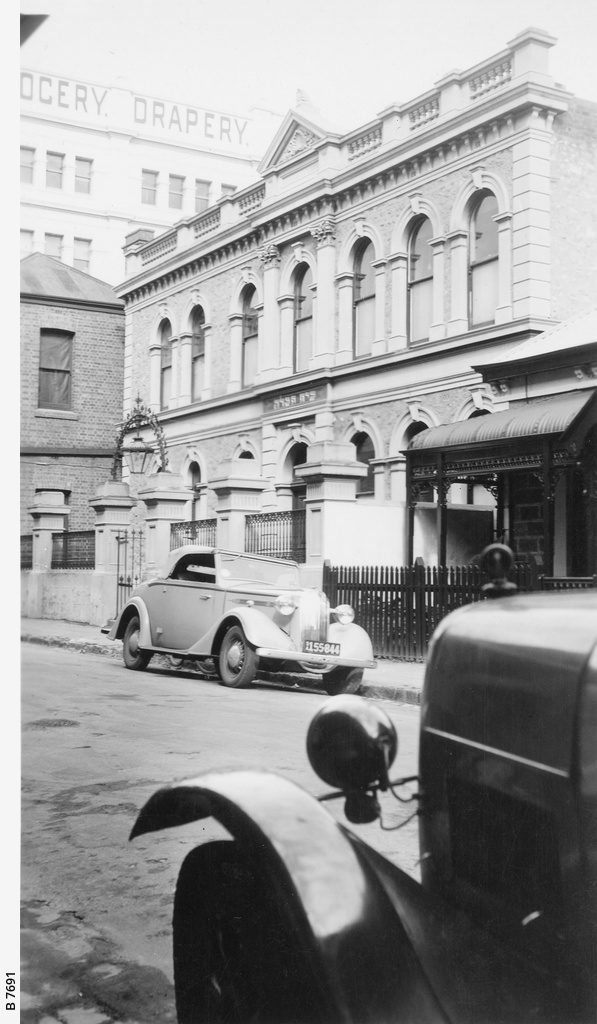
Adelaide Hebrew Congregation, Synagogue Place, 1938, shortly before remodelling

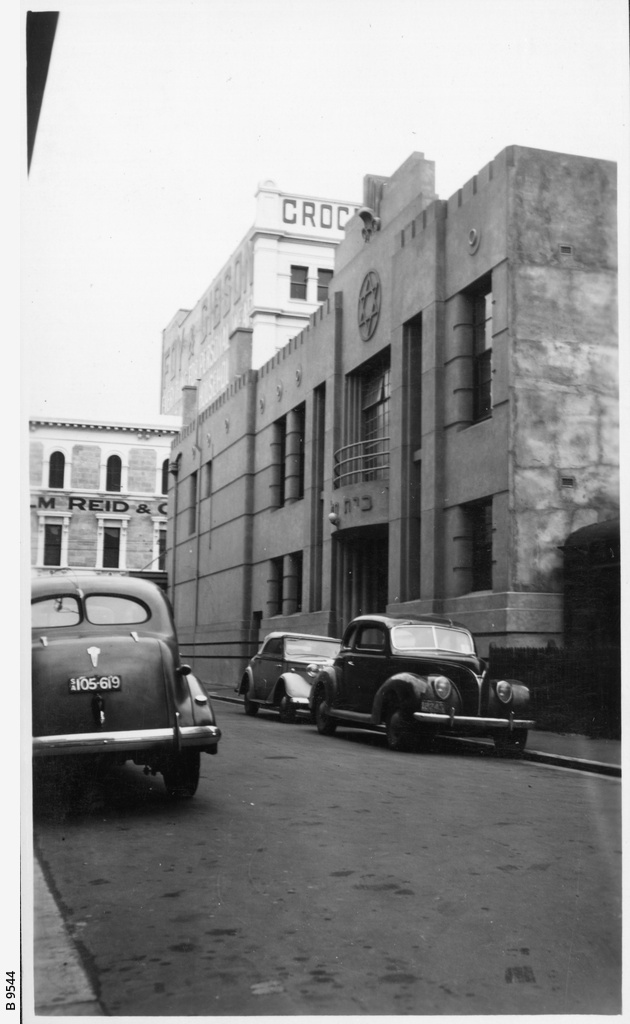
Adelaide Hebrew Congregation, Synagogue Place, 1940

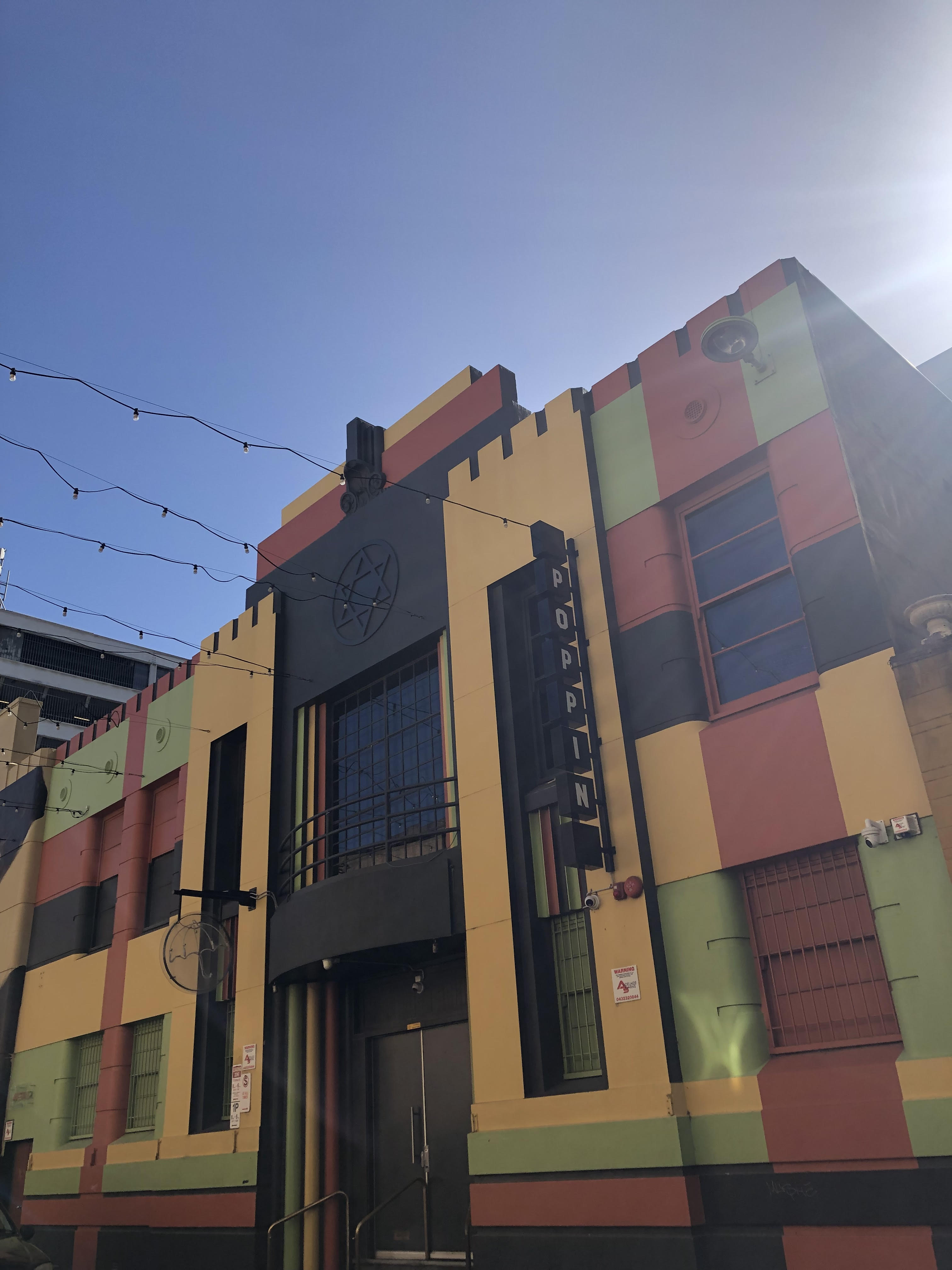
Adelaide Hebrew Congregation from 1870 to 1990, Synagogue Place, off Rundle Street, 2024

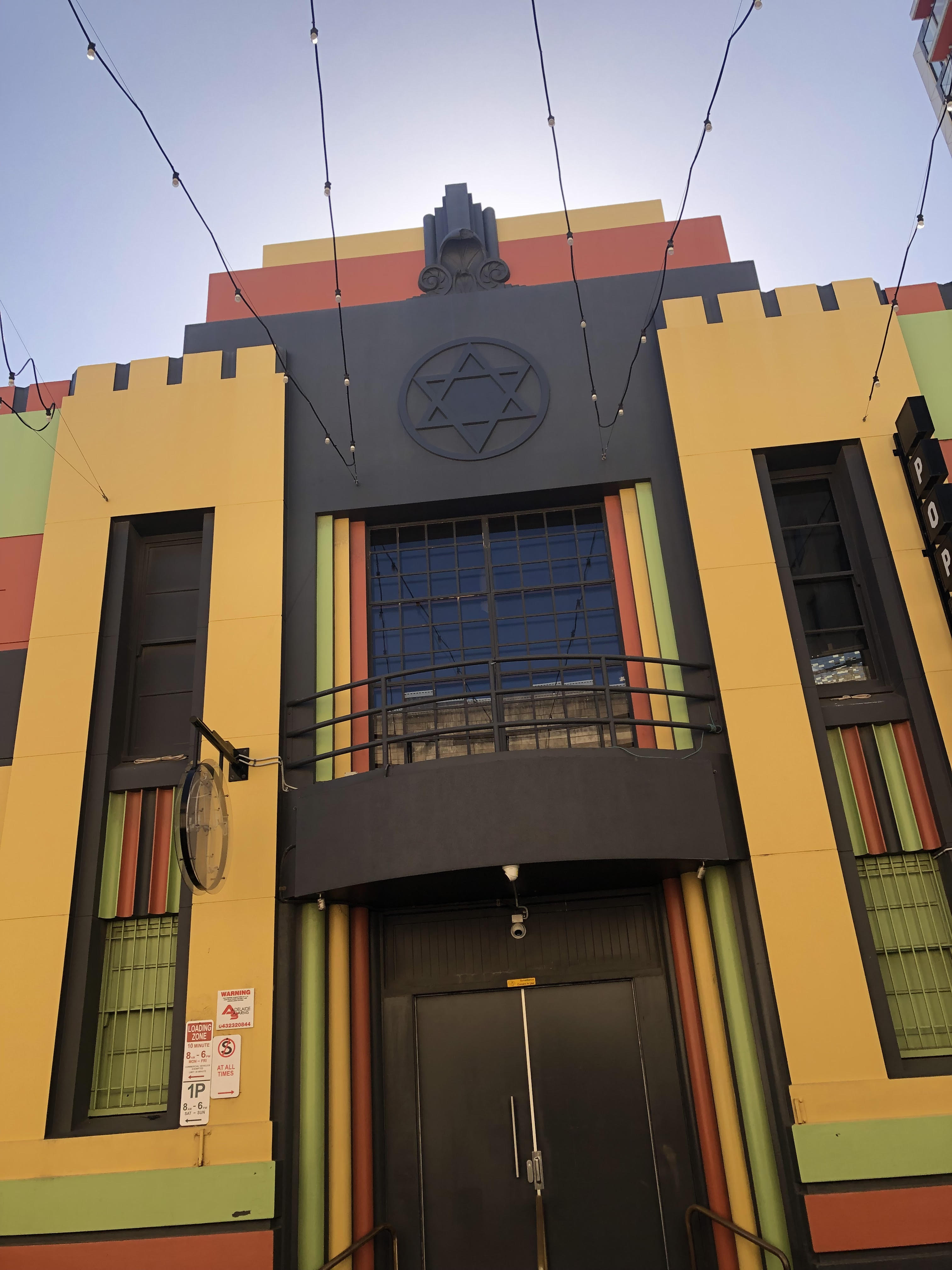
Adelaide Hebrew Congregation from 1870 to 1990, Synagogue Place, off Rundle Street, 2024

== See also ==
- Adelaide Holocaust Museum and Andrew Steiner Education Centre
- History of the Jews in Australia
- List of synagogues in Australia
