= Harriet Alice Dumolo =

Australian educator (1875–1944)

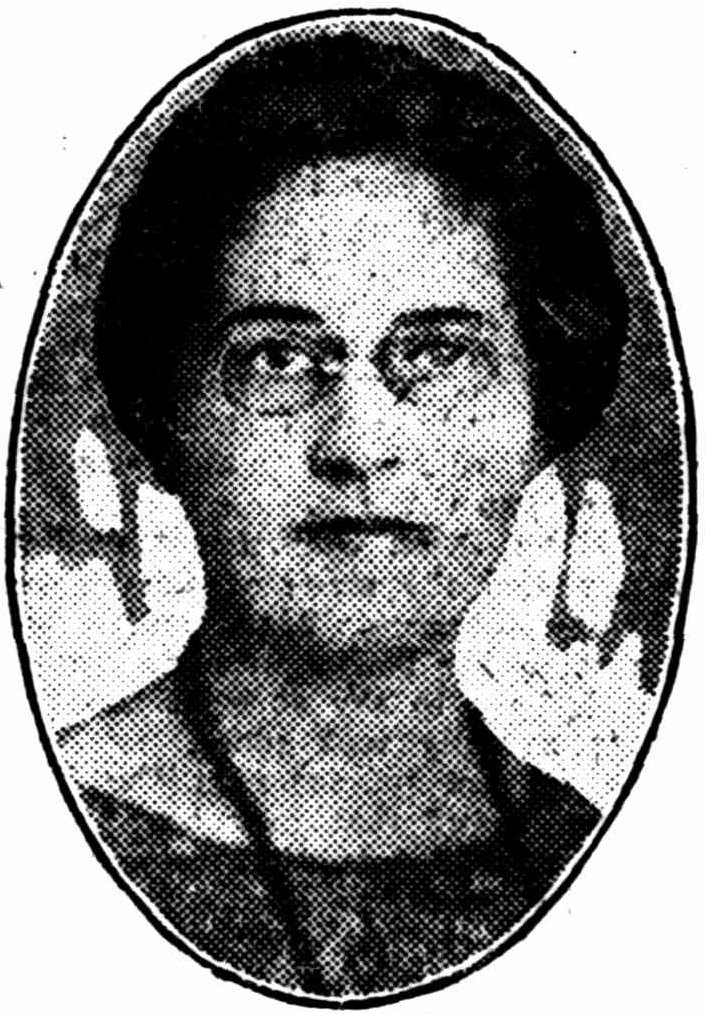
Harriet Dumolo

Harriet Alice "Haddie" Dumolo (17 September 1875 – 3 February 1944) was an early childhood educator in New South Wales.

== History ==
Dumolo was born at "Ladybank", Tamworth, Staffordshire (prev. in Warwickshire), the eldest of three daughters of John Thomas Dumolo, who owned a colliery, and his wife Alice Dumolo, née Hodgkinson. They emigrated to Sydney on the Cuzco, arriving in November 1881. The father founded a chemist's shop in Waterloo, moving to St. Leonards. The girls were educated at the private school run by the Misses Liggins and Arnold at Jeffrey street, Kirribilli Point, (later to become SCECGS Redlands, Military Road, Cremorne).

In 1897 she was one of the first five to be awarded a Kindergarten Teacher's Certificate by the Teachers' Association of New South Wales. By 1903 she was Principal of St Philip's kindergarten, then entered the Kindergarten College, graduating in 1905. In 1909, she joined the staff of the Kindergarten Training College, Roslyn Gardens, Sydney, and by the end of 1911 she was acting Principal, and Principal a year later. She was responsible for the move to Henrietta Street, Waverley, when it was renamed the Sydney Kindergarten Training College. She was responsible for the founding in 1922 of the Frances Newton Memorial Free Kindergarten at 287 Bourke Street, Darlinghurst. She retired in 1932 and in 1935 was awarded King George V's silver jubilee medal.

She died of cerebral haemorrhage and was cremated. The Harriet Dumolo Memorial Room of the Kindergarten College was named in her honour. Her two sisters, Nona (1877–1966), who was Principal of New England Girls' School from 1925 to 1939, and Elsie (1879-1963) were both prominent in the Church of England girls' education system and all three were active workers for St Alban's Anglican Church, Lindfield.
