= Le Gall =

Le Gall is a Breton surname (Ar Gall), and may refer to:

- Amélie Le Gall, French cyclist in the 1890s
- Anthony Le Gall (born 1985), French footballer
- Arnaud Le Gall (born 1980), French politician
- Frank Le Gall (born 1959), French author of comics
- Jean-François Le Gall (born 1959), French mathematician
- Jean-Yves Le Gall (born 1959), French engineer and businessman

== See also ==
- Gall (surname)
- De Gaulle
