= Frances Newton (educator) =

American early childhood educator

Frances E. Newton (born 1865) was an American early childhood educator who had a strong influence on the development of kindergartens in Australia.

She was trained in the teaching methods of John Dewey in her native Chicago and with four other ladies founded "Gertrude House" of the Chicago Kindergarten Institute.

She was brought out to Sydney in November 1902 on a three-year contract as principal of the Kindergarten Training Centre, Roslyn Street, Darlinghurst. She laid the foundation for the success of the Sydney Kindergarten Training College, Waverley. Her disciples included Harriet Alice Dumolo (1875–1944) and Zoe Benjamin (1882–1962). In 1905 Newton and Lillian Daphne de Lissa were invited by Bertram Hawker to report on kindergartens in South Australia.

It would appear that Newton died some time between 1910 and 1920.

The Frances Newton Memorial Free Kindergarten at 287 Bourke-street, Darlinghurst, founded by Dumolo and opened in 1922, was named for her.

In 1902, Lillian Daphne de Lissa began studying at the Sydney Kindergarten Teachers College, where she was influenced by Frances Newton, and was a leading figure in kindergarten development in South Australia.
