= Ernest Gall =

Australian commercial photographer (1863–1925)

Ernest Gall (14 April 1863 – 19 April 1925) was a prolific commercial photographer in Adelaide, South Australia, who was praised for the artistic quality of his work.

== History ==
Gall, a son of printer David Gall, first came to public notice in 1889 with a series on the newly-developed irrigation colony at Renmark. He was previously employed as assistant to McLean Brothers, Rigg and Co., ironmongers in Hindley Street, but finding the work tiresome, decided to turn his hobby of photography into a full-time occupation.

He was the first in South Australia to do half-tone prints. He was successful in supplying photographs for illustrated catalogues.

He was one of the oldest members of the South Australian Photographic Society, having joined before 1889. From around 1900 he was mostly involved in judging and exhibiting non-competitively.

By 1893 he was working for Walter Scott-Barry, (c. 1849 – 5 October 1911) ex-Government photographer who had studios at 146 Rundle Street from 1890 to 1896, moved to Mount Gambier, then Warrnambool, Victoria.

In 1894 he made a glass-plate copy of Henry Jones's 1872 mosaic collection of Old Colonists, in which 24 portraits are somewhat different from Jones's original held by the State Library. The circumstances around this work are not explained.

By 1895 he had his own studio in Grenfell Street, later at Alma Chambers in Pirie Street, and was official photographer for many high-profile events, including balls at Government House and at Federation conventions. In 1898 he began using flash illumination.

In later years he concentrated on portraiture, working from a studio at his home, "Woodbridge" at Tynte Street east, North Adelaide. He was active in promoting North Adelaide as a part of the city, rather than a suburb. It was there he died, on 19 April 1925. Though courteous and urbane, he was of a shy and retiring nature, played no part in public affairs, and never married.

== Publications ==
- Gall's Glimpses of Adelaide and South Australia Hussey & Gillingham (1902) "an exquisitely printed reproduction of 80 of the beautifully clear and artistic views of architecture and out-of-door scenes for which Mr. Ernest Gall is famed as a photographer."
- Gall's South Australian Scenes (1904) "a companion booklet to Gall's Glimpses of Adelaide and South Australia"

== Legacy ==
The State Library of South Australia holds a large collection of his historic photographs, mostly of buildings, taken 1889–1910, particularly the earlier date.
