= Harold Krantz =

Australian architect

- Born: 15 February 1906; Adelaide, South Australia
- Died: 8 March 1999 (aged 93); Nedlands, Western Australia
- Resting place: Karrakatta Cemetery
- Occupation: Architect
- Years active: 1899–1974
- Spouse: Dorothy Hope Powell (m. 1933–1994)
- Children: 2
- Relatives: Abraham Tobias Boas (grandfather); Harold Boas (uncle); Lionel Boas (uncle)

Harold Krantz OBE (15 February 1906 – 8 March 1999) AO was an architect in Western Australia. He became a well-known in his adopted city of Perth, where it is believed that he designed around ninety percent of all apartment buildings in the city between the 1930s and 1960s.

== Early life ==
He was born in Adelaide to Russian Jewish immigrant parents. His grandfather, Abraham Tobias Boas was the city's first rabbi, serving the Adelaide Hebrew Congregation. His uncle, Harold Boas also became a prominent architect and town planner in Perth in Western Australia.

== Career ==
After qualifying as an architect in Adelaide, he worked for the firm Woods, Bagot, Jory & Laybourne Smith. As employment options became more limited for architects in South Australia at the time, he joined his uncle, Harold Boas in Perth to work at his firm, Oldham, Boas & Ednie-Brown. He registered as an architect in Western Australia in 1929, but for the next two years dedicated himself to running a commercial art business, the Poster Studios, established by Krantz, John Oldham and Colin Ednie-Brown. There, he also worked with the architect, Margaret Pitt Morison.

He returned to architecture in 1931 and from the mid-1930s, he began designing smaller apartment blocks and conversions.

In 1938 he designed the Nedland Tennis Clubhouse, where he was a member, opting for a functionalist style.

In 1939, he began working with Viennese Jewish architect, Robert Schläfrig (later changed to Sheldon), who had fled antisemitism in Europe. In 1946 they formed the firm, Krantz and Sheldon. In particular, the firm hired a high number of architects who had emigrated to Australia from Europe. They hired a number of arrivals at Fremantle Harbour, including Iwan Iwanoff. This fostered more European-influenced design styles, deviating from the British and American norms that had dominated.

He was a vocal defender of apartment living, denying that they would inevitably become "slums". In 1941 he wrote in the Architecture magazine about their positive economic and sociological attributes.

In 1956, Krantz and Sheldon designed Wandana Flats in Subiaco for the State Housing Commission of Western Australia. The three-block complex was the first high-rise public housing project in Western Australia.

His firm partner, Sheldon, died in 1968 and Krantz retired in 1972.

== Personal life ==
In December 1933, he married the actress, Dorothy Hope Powell, with whom he had two children. His son, David, also became an architect and worked for his father's firm. Dorothy died in 1994.

== Honours ==
In 1998, the City of Perth named him "Citizen of the Year". In the same year, the Royal Australian Institute of Architects made him a Life Fellow. He was nominated for the Order of Australia shortly before his death, with his son accepting the award posthumously on his behalf.
