= John Gall =

John Gall may refer to:

- John Gall (author) (1925–2014), American author, pediatrician, and theorist of systems
- John Gall (baseball) (born 1978), Major League Baseball player
- John Gall (designer) (born 1963), American graphic designer
