= Zoe Benjamin =

Early childhood education pioneer (1882 – 1962

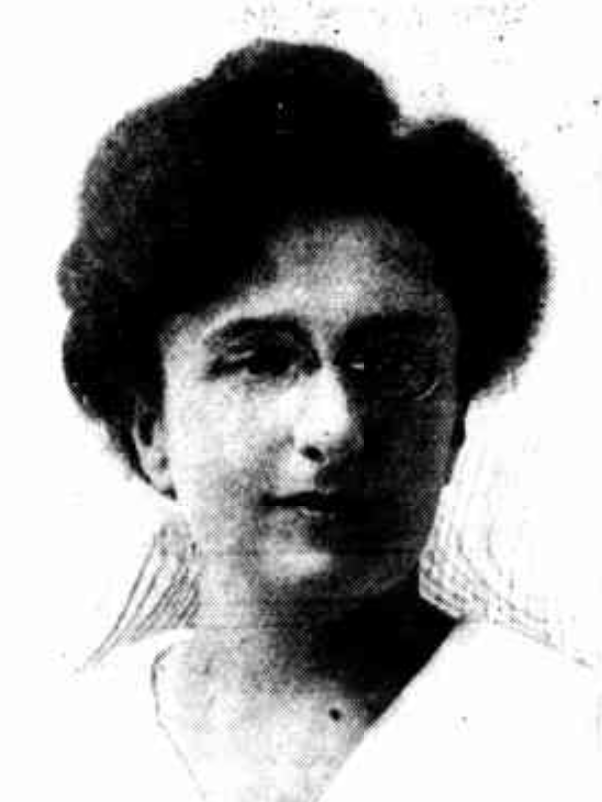
Zoe Benjamin, lecturer in psychology and principles of education, c. 1925

Sophia "Zoe" Benjamin (24 December 1882 – 13 April 1962) was a pioneer of early childhood education in Australia.

== History ==
Zoe was born in Adelaide, South Australia to Philip Benjamin (1848–1924) and his wife Miriam "Minnie" Benjamin, née Cohen (1852–1918), Orthodox Jews. Philip was a nephew of Judah Moss Solomon (1818–1880) and closely related to Vaiben Louis Solomon (1853–1908), Elias Solomon MLA, MHR (1839–1809) and a number of other Jews prominent in Adelaide and elsewhere in Australia. Around 1888 the family moved to Rushcutters Bay, Sydney, and from around 1892 to 1895 she attended Darlinghurst Superior School, otherwise she received private tuition. Zoe was a true dwarf.

She gained a diploma from the Kindergarten Training College, Roslyn Street, Darlinghurst in 1905, when Frances Newton was still principal, and served for a year at the kindergarten attached to The Infants' Home Child and Family Services, Ashfield, before being appointed director of the Froebel Kindergarten attached to the Training College. She then taught at the Sydney Norland Institute, the newly opened offshoot of Emily Ward's Norland Nursing College, and around 1910 founded the Australian Kindergarten Magazine. She joined the staff of Darlinghurst Superior School in 1912, lecturing in psychology and education. She was appointed vice-principal of the Sydney Kindergarten and Preparatory Teachers' College.

She was a disciple of Friedrich Fröbel's theories of early education, which focussed on undirected play and encouraged other kindergartens to introduce periods of free play. In 1912 she gave her views comparing Froebel and Montessori education. In 1924 she established the Free Kindergarten Mothers' Union, and in 1930 founded a holiday home for children of the suburbs to experience a little of country life. In 1916 she delivered a paper on sex education for children, which was well received.

In 1937 she resigned from the Teachers' College to concentrate on parental training, and in 1944 published a pamphlet Education for Parenthood, which was reviewed positively. Other publications were Talks to Parents in 1947 and The Schoolchild and his Parents in 1950. She ran classes in parent education with the WEA and gave lectures on child study at Sydney University. She was a regular lecturer for the New Education Fellowship's parent education committee. She wrote articles for women's magazines and frequently gave talks on child psychology on ABC Radio.

She suffered loss of sight in her later years, and completely blind, she died at her Hunters Hill home in April 1962. She never married. A Zoe Benjamin Memorial Fund was established in her name and has made a valuable contribution to the Public Library of New South Wales.
