= Reginald Louis Solomon =

Reginald Louis Solomon (1877 – 18 June 1939) was publisher of (Adelaide) Truth, convicted of publishing an "obscene libel" in 1907.

== History ==
Solomon was born in Adelaide, the only son of Benjamin Solomon (3 November 1844 – 18 September 1922), later known as Colonel Solomon, and Louisa Solomon, née Lee, who married in 1867. He was educated at Glenelg Grammar School, and followed his father into the South Australian Militia as a bombardier, and was elected inaugural president of the North Adelaide Rifle Club. He acted as an official at meetings of the Affiliated Rifle Clubs.

In 1906 Charles Walter Chandler, (Note: Charles Walter Chandler (1861 – 31 July 1936) was founder of the Port Pirie Standard, a predecessor of that town's Recorder. He fought in WWI, married Harriet (or Harriett) Forbes on 28 December 1885 at Kensington; Percy Forbes Chandler, printer of Melbourne, was a son. Probably not related to contemporary journalist Alfred Thomas Chandler (1852–1941).) founder of Adelaide Truth, and having a reputation for reckless journalism, appointed Solomon as its publisher, while retaining the editor's chair. In September 1906 Chandler went through a form of sale of the business to one A. Hall, perhaps intending to boost its value in anticipation of a future sale to John Norton. Hall then sold the business to Solomon, in another paper transaction. Solomon and his associate John Amos began removing machinery for possible sale, but was caught by Chandler, who sued him for trespass.

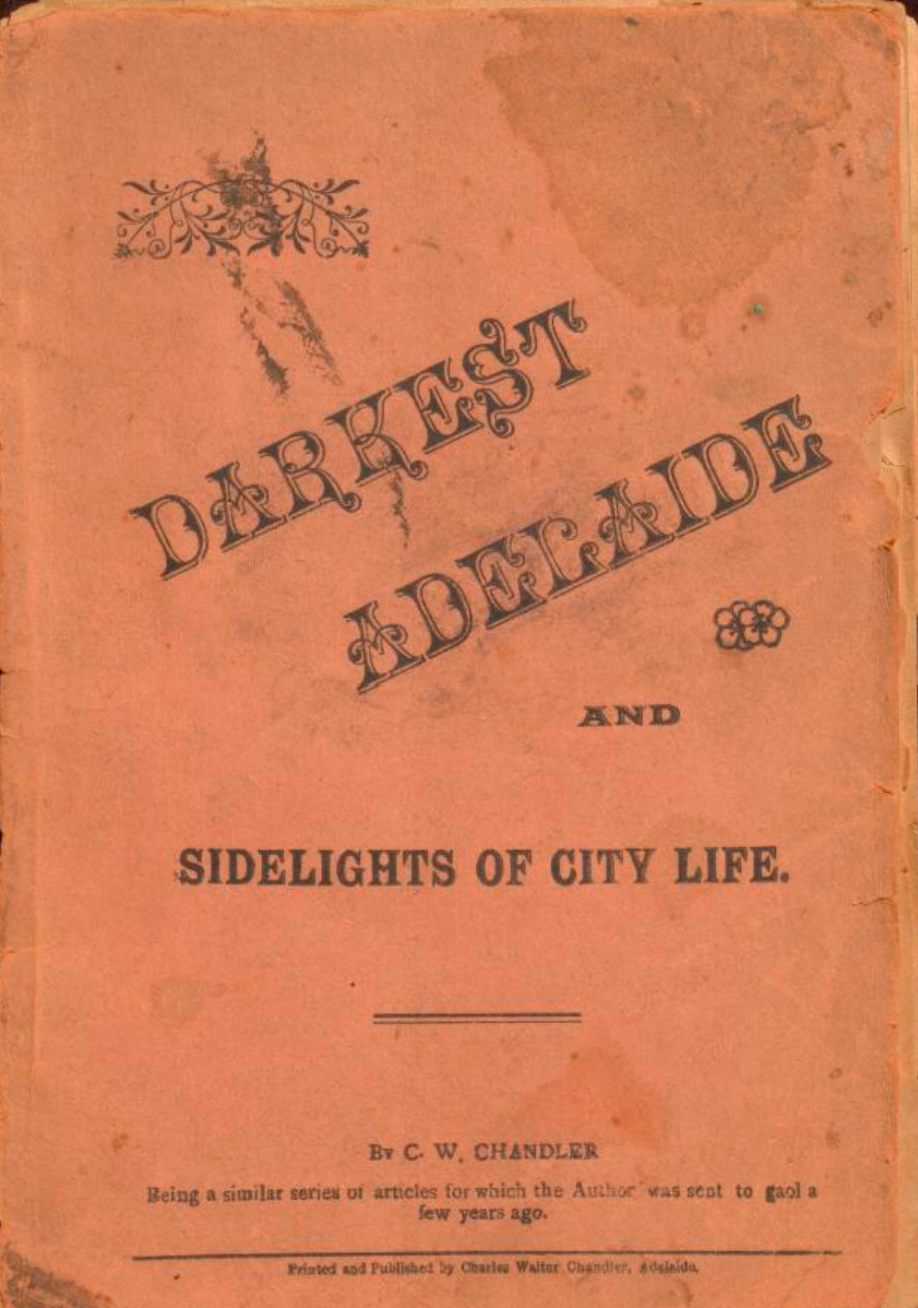
Chandler's 1907 book

On 21 May 1907 he was charged with publishing an "obscene libel" in an article in the "Darkest Adelaide" column in the Adelaide Truth of 6 April, "to the manifest corruption of the morals as well of youth as of other liege subjects of our said Lord the King, in contempt of our said Lord the King and his laws, to the evil example of all others in the like case offending and against the peace of our Lord the King, his Crown and dignity". Despite the warning of "manifest corruption", within hours there was not a back-issue to be had.

The text of the article is not available, but Chandler, its probable author, recounted in his book Darkest Adelaide (1907) how he had been propositioned by a girl 12 or 13 years of age, offering her services for ten shillings and how, without committing himself, he had driven her price down to three.
The Register mentioned that a public figure was the owner of premises being used as a brothel, and that Truth had threatened to name him.

Solomon was found guilty of publishing an obscene article without evil intent. He then refused to show contrition, so waived his rights under provisions of the First Offenders Act. The Sunday Times of Perth, which must have gone to considerable lengths to obtain a copy, thundered that "The only thing we could do was to hurry the abomination away . . . for immediate incarceration", opining that Solomon should have received a sentence of 25 years not 25 pounds.

Adelaide Truth ceased publication that same year. In 1911 Solomon set himself up as a tax consultant with an office in Beaconsfield Buildings, Victoria Square, offering total secrecy and claiming to have worked in the Taxation Department for six years. He was later in partnership with his father as auctioneers and tax consultants at the City Auction Mart, Victoria Square.

He had a long association with the horse racing industry, and, after the death of his father, left for Sydney where, from premises at Gardyne Street, Waverley, he published Sporting Tabs, a horse-racing guide.

Solomon died at 117 Nelson Bay road, Bronte, New South Wales.

== Family ==
Solomon married Nell; they had two daughters:

- Phyllis Solomon was born in Western Australia on 3 July 1905.
- Lorna Elive Solomon was born in 1906, married Norman Webb on 3 July 1929; and settled in Melbourne.
