= David Gall (printer) =

English-born Australian printer (1825–1887)

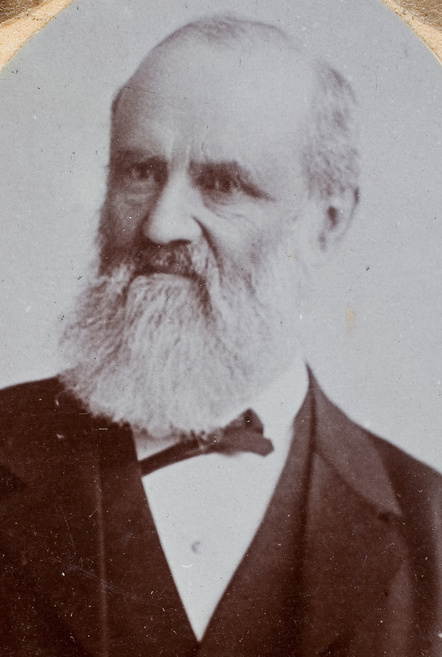
- Born: 1825; Woodbridge, Suffolk
- Died: 21 December 1887 (aged 61–62)
- Occupation: Printer

David Gall (c. 1825 – 21 December 1887) was a printer in the early days of colonial South Australia.

== History ==
Gall was born in Woodbridge, Suffolk, where he served his apprenticeship as a printer, worked for a time in London, then with his young wife emigrated to South Australia aboard William Stevenson, arriving in Adelaide in May 1850.

He found employment in the printing business, and in July 1855 was admitted to the partnership of Hussey & Shawyer, trading as Hussey, Shawyer and Gall on King William Street, "near Green's Exchange". Shawyer left in 1856 to open his own printery on Gawler Place, and Hussey and Gall continued to March 1857, when Gall took over the running of the business, at that time located at 47 King William Street, adjacent Green's Auction Mart, "at the end of a long passage". In August 1859 they moved to larger premises at 89 King William Street, opposite White's Rooms.

They were still at the same address when Gall founded The Comet (February 1867 – December 1881), a monthly magazine which he used, inter alia to promote his arguments for protection of native industries. In 1871 the business was saved from destruction when the "Nimble Ninepence" store next door was destroyed by fire. Reginald Sheridan (died 8 November 1882), the manager, commenced removal of records and valuable paper after the first explosion, but in the event action by the fire brigade prevented the fire from spreading. In January 1873 Gall sold the business to Sheridan, who continued to run it as "Gall & Sheridan", until July 1875, when he sold it to George, Edmund and George Scrymgour, jun., the first two having been members of Gall's staff. They continued trading as Gall & Sheridan until November, when it became Scrymgour & Sons, and was still operating under that name at 115 King William Street in 1962.

== Other interests ==
- Gall was a prolific letter-writer to the Adelaide press, ever ready to push his views on a variety of subjects. He believed without protection, Australian industry and enterprise would never develop, and under the slogan "What shall we do with our boys?", and its reply "Encourage local industries, so as to give them profitable employment" strongly argued his case.
- He was a supporter of the Botanic Garden, and strenuously fought attempts by Sir Edwin Smith to annex six or eight of its acres for the Zoological Gardens.
- He protested against excision of further Park Land for the benefit of the "Old Race Course" (Victoria Park).
- He was vocal in his condemnation of mistreatment of racehorses and an active supporter of the Society for the Prevention of Cruelty to Animals .
- He was regular church-goer, an adherent of The Christian Church, in Grote Street, with which his erstwhile partner Herbert Hussey was closely associated.
- He was a founding member of the South Australian Chamber of Manufactures, and a member of its committee.
- While on holidays in Europe, following his relinquishing of the business to Sheridan, he wrote regular reports for the South Australian press, and later, as "Delta", was a regular contributor to the South-Eastern Star, a Mount Gambier weekly published by James Fletcher Jones & Co. from 2 October 1877 to 13 October 1930, when it was taken over by its competitor The Border Watch.
- One of his particular interests was the North Adelaide School for the Blind.
- He edited a Guide to Adelaide, published by Scrymgour & Sons, for the use of visitors to the Jubilee Exhibition.
- Though never a political candidate he was, as a frequent auditor in the Strangers' Gallery, well informed on political debate in both houses of parliament.
- He was an active member of the Field Naturalists Society, and a frequent participant in their rambles.
- He was recognised as an amateur artist.

== Family ==
Gall married Maria Cottingham (c. 1823 – 16 November 1855) before emigrating to South Australia in 1850.

- Maria Gall (1852 – 28 March 1940)

He married again, to Winnifred Mary Giles (c. 1819 – 18 November 1888) on 16 October 1857

- Ernest Gall (14 April 1863 – 19 April 1925), the photographer

They had a family home at 17 Tynte Street, North Adelaide.
