= Benjamin Solomon =

Australian public servant and military officer

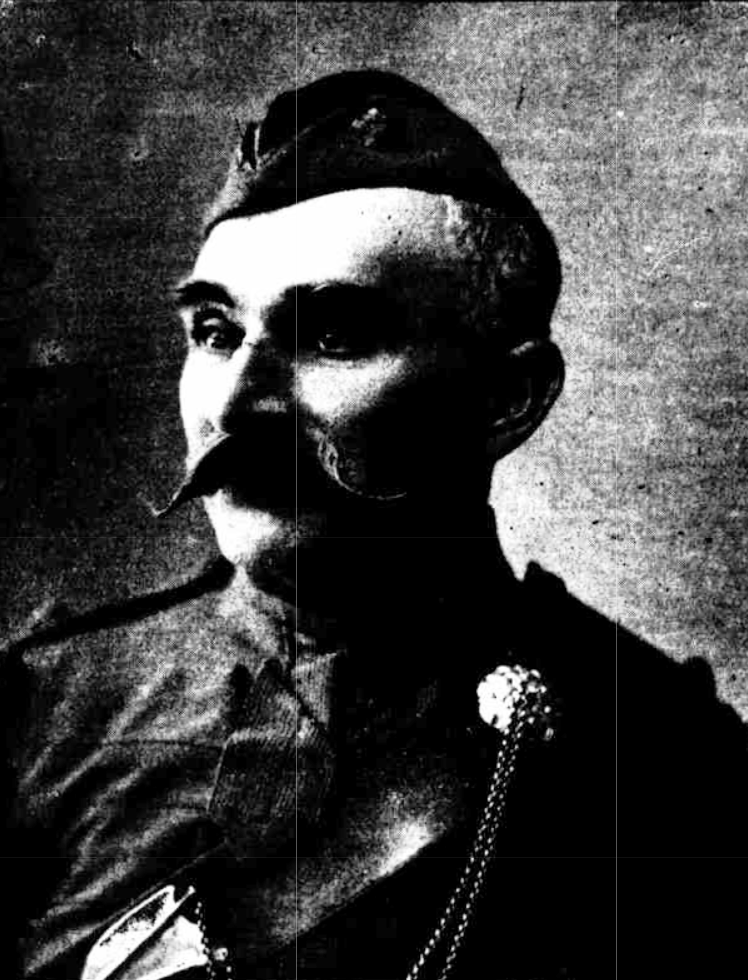
- Solomon in c. 1899
- Born: 3 November 1844; Brisbane, Queensland
- Died: 18 September 1922 (aged 77)
- Military career
- Allegiance: Colony of South Australia; Australia
- Branch: South Australian Volunteer Forces; Citizen Military Forces
- Service years: 1871–1905
- Rank: Lieutenant Colonel
- Awards: Volunteer Officers' Decoration

Benjamin "Ben" Solomon, VD (3 November 1844 – 18 September 1922), commonly referred to as Colonel Solomon, was a public servant in Colonial South Australia, and an officer of the colony's volunteer defence force.

== History ==
Solomon was born in Brisbane, a son of Judah Moss Solomon (21 December 1818 – 29 August 1880), Queensland's Government Auctioneer, later mayor of Adelaide and a member of both of South Australia's houses of parliament.

The family left for Adelaide in 1846, by his uncle Emmanuel Solomon's brig Dorset, Captain Walsh. The family first lived in Stephens Place, their residence becoming a rendezvous for the gold escort operators Tolmer and Alford. In February 1854 the family left for England in the steamer Australia, carrying a valuable cargo of gold. The ship struck a reef near Cape Town, so the passengers took to the boats, and were rescued by the steamer Royal Shepherdess, which had been following the Australia. Their steamer turned out not to have badly damaged and resumed its voyage. They remained in England for three years, Solomon and his elder brother Moss Judah Solomon attending London College, (Note: It is likely he and his brother Moss Judah Solomon earlier attended J. L. Young's abortive Adelaide High School on Stephens Place before establishment of his better-known Adelaide Educational Institution.) and on their return to Adelaide he resumed his studies at St Peter's College He received further education at St Peter's College, winning prizes in 1858 and 1861, then embarked on a career as general agent and auctioneer.

Solomon joined the State Civil Service as an officer of the Adelaide Local Court, which he held for 17 years, then transferred to the Land Tax Department, where he became assessor and valuator, also valuator for the Probate Department and Government auctioneer. His duties took him to every corner of South Australia, a job requiring great reserves of tact and energy, which he filled admirably, retiring in 1915 at age 70 after 34 years of service. He was a proud civil servant, and was interested in the welfare of his officers. He was a vice-president of the Civil Service Association and helped establish the Public Service Provident Fund, of which he was chairman for two years. He was elected president of the Public Service Federal Council in 1897. In 1914 he accepted the wartime position of censor, later chief military censor for South Australia, which he held for two years, to be succeeded by Maj. Smeaton.

== Military career ==
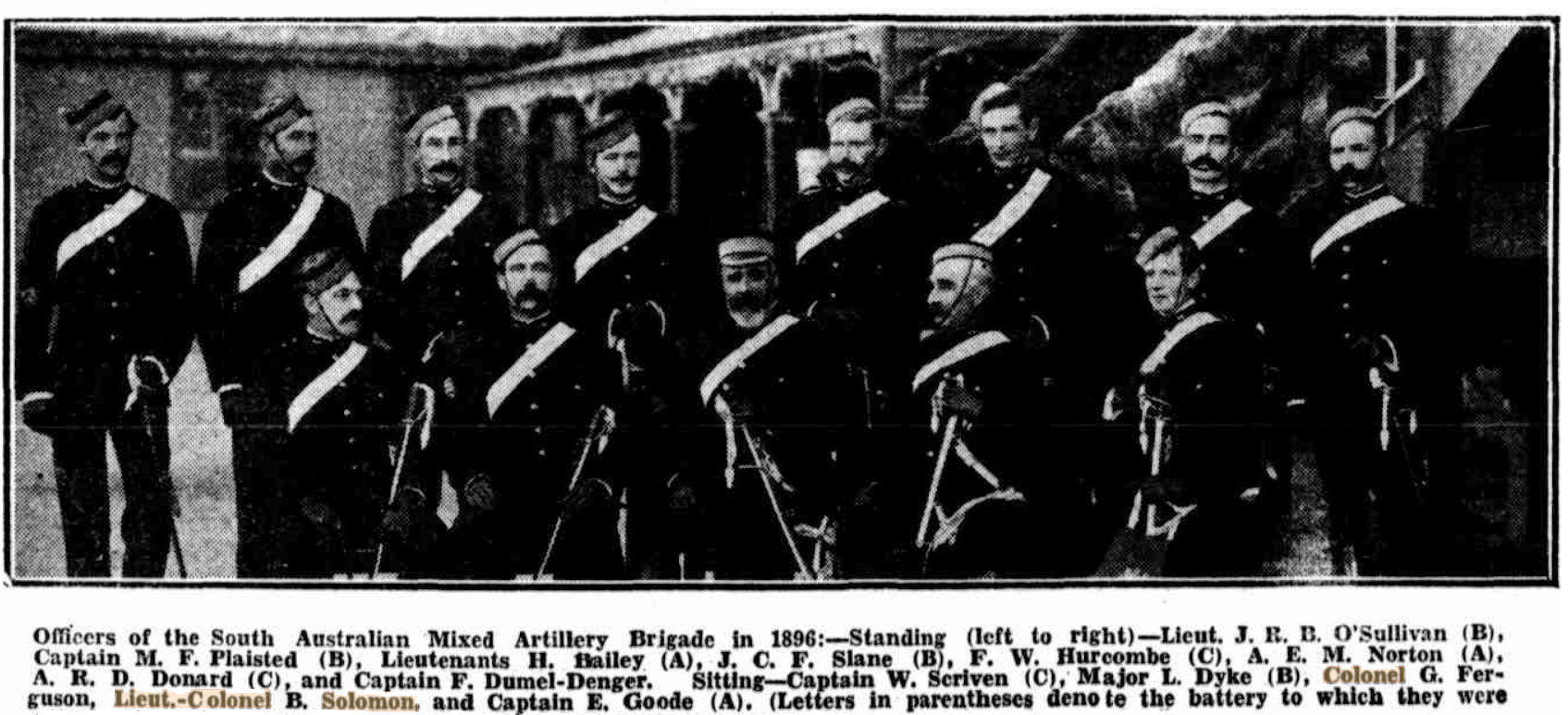
Officers of the SA Mixed Artillery Brigade 1896

Solomon's military career began at age 16, joining "A" Battery of the Adelaide Field Artillery under Colonel Robert Richard Torrens. In 1877 was made a commissioned officer; in 1878 he became captain, in 1882 major, and in 1897 lieutenant-colonel. He was awarded the Volunteer Officers' Decoration (VD) in 1901, most likely presented by the Duke of York (the future George V) on his visit to Adelaide in July 1901, presumably at the Royal levee on 10 July 1901. (Note: Numerous obituaries repeated the assertion that Solomon was handed the decoration by the King in 1900.)

Solomon retired from military service in 1905. With the declaration of war in 1914, he came out of retirement to establish the office of military censor for South Australia, and served as chief censor for over a year, before retiring due to pressure of work.

== Other interests ==
Solomon was a prominent Freemason, a past grand warden, and a life member of the Lodge of Friendship.

On two separate occasions at Glenelg he saved a stranger from drowning, and was recognised by the Royal Humane Society.

== Family ==
Moss Judah Solomon (15 June 1843 – 11 February 1933), Vaiben Louis Solomon MHA MHR (13 May 1853 – 20 October 1908), and Elias Solomon MLA, MHR (2 September 1839 – 23 May 1909) were brothers, and Morris Lyon Marks MHA (7 September 1824 – 4 March 1893) and Maurice Salom MLC (1 July 1831 – 10 October 1903) were brothers-in-law.

Solomon married Louisa Lee (31 December 1846 – 27 December 1933) (Note: Louisa was a daughter of Philip Lee ( – 21 January 1861), SA's first Jewish settler, arriving on Tam O'Shanter in November 1836.) on 27 February 1867. Their children include:

- Rachel Henrietta Solomon (1868 – 10 February 1940) married Harry Chalinder (c. 1862 – 18 March 1941)
- Reginald Louis Solomon (1877 – 18 June 1939) was publisher of (Adelaide) Truth newspaper, later tax agent in partnership with his father.
