= Lance Solomon =

Australian artist (1913–1989)

Lance Vaiben Solomon (27 January 1913 – 1989) was an Australian painter, noted for his landscapes. He won the prestigious Wynne Prize on two occasions, in 1946 and 1953.

== History ==
Lance was born in Liverpool, New South Wales, a son of Edwin Arthur Vaiben Solomon (20 September 1877 – ), a cabinetmaker, and his wife Jessie Elizabeth Solomon, née Black (1874 – 13 May 1951). Vaiben Solomon (1802–1860) an emancipist transported in 1818 was a grandfather.

He grew up in a house built by his grandfather in Liverpool, which was then bushland on the outskirts of Sydney, moving to Manly in 1920. He always loved drawing, but had little interest in other classes, and left school at age 15. Despite the harsh economic times he was able to earn a few shillings with his pencil and watercolors. At Marsfield he met Robert Johnson (1890–1964), who introduced him to oils. Sometime around 1930 he took lessons with J. S. Watkins and classes at the East Sydney Technical College. He mounted a one-man exhibition at the Rubery Bennett Galleries in 1937, which drew favorable reviews and at another in 1938 sold a large work to influential art patron Howard Hinton. In 1938 he married longtime girlfriend Beryl Nasmith, and moved to Narrabeen.

In 1939 his North West 1939 won a New South Wales Travelling Art Scholarship, which enabled him to study at the Royal Academy School in London. Soon after, however, Britain was at war with Germany and hoped-for travels through Europe were dashed, but his time in England was not totally wasted: he gained the patronage of Reginald Brundrit (1883–1960), and took some lessons with a German Jew named Bloch, before returning to Sydney in April 1940.

He had joined the Citizens Military Force, as a volunteer, in May 1931, giving his trade as "electrician", place of employment 175 George Street, Sydney, and served with the Citizens' Air Force as photographer, discharged in 1933. so offered his services with the 2nd AIF in 1940 and served for 18 months as a cook at Greta, while his wife stayed with a brother in Coolah. He later worked in a munitions factory.

He won his first Wynne prize for January Weather in 1946, when he was living at Canley Vale. In 1947 he sold his painting Country Lane to the National Gallery of New South Wales. He was praised by Norman Lindsay and by The Bulletin, consequently tickets to his exhibitions were quickly sold out. The Government presented Elizabeth, the Queen Mother with one painting, Blue Lagoon, and Percy Spender, the American Consul, took another back to America.

Feeling intimidated by constant attention, Solomon left his beautiful home at Narroween for "Brushwoods", a derelict bush shack at Lisarow, then in 1962, after several serious accidents, for a cottage at Umina. He enjoyed travelling with fellow artist Henry Aloysius Hanke to Mudgee and other areas, in search of subjects for painting. Solomon never had his pictures framed, sometimes using old used frames. When his agents Morley & Torda sent him a bill for framing several pictures, he took his business elsewhere.

In January 1988 a retrospective exhibition, recognising his 75th birthday and fifty years' work, was held at Gosford Gallery. It was his last exhibition before he died.

== Family ==
Solomon married Beryl Nasmith (Note: This surname has been substantiated, rather than the more familiar "Naismith".) sometime in 1938. They had two sons: Trevor (born 1940), and Clifford (born 1942). He died after four months' serious illness, which necessitated amputating a leg.

== Recognition ==
- He won a New South Wales travelling scholarship in 1939
- The NSW Government purchased his Blue Lagoon in 1955 and presented it to HM the Queen Mother during her visit to Australia in 1958
- He won the Wynne Prize in 1946 for January Weather, and in 1953 for The River Bend.
- He won Rural Bank prizes for his paintings Bush Dweller in 1961, and again in 1965 for Mellow Day, which was later purchased by the Royal Agricultural Society of NSW for presentation to the Duke and Duchess of Gloucester.
- Royal Agricultural Society Easter Show 1961, 1962 and 1965.

His work is shown in the National Gallery of Australia, Canberra and several State galleries. The Art Gallery of NSW purchased another eight of his paintings in 1958'

== Bibliography ==
A memorial exhibition was held at Kenthurst Galleries, Sydney, in June 1989, one outcome of which was publication of a limited edition (500 copies) quarto volume:

Jennings, Eddi and Benkendorff, Robin. A Tribute to Lance Vaiben Solomon (1913–1989). ill. SOLOMON, Lance Vaiben. Kenthurst, Sydney: Dekiki, 1990.

The book includes a foreword by Sir William Dargie, biographical notes and photographs.

== Sources ==
- McCulloch, Alan Encyclopedia of Australian Art Hutchinson of London 1968
