= Harold Boas =

Australian town planner and architect

- Born: 27 September 1883; Adelaide, South Australia
- Died: 17 September 1980 (aged 96); Subiaco, Western Australia
- Education: South Australian School of Mines and Industries
- Occupation: Architect
- Years active: 1899–1974
- Spouse: Elizabeth née Cohen
- Parent(s): Abraham Tobias Boas and Elizabeth, née Solomon
- Relatives: Isaac Herbert Boas; Lionel Tobias Boas; Harold Krantz

Harold Boas OBE (27 September 1883 – 17 September 1980) was a town planner and architect in Western Australia. Boas designed many public buildings in and around Perth and was an influential Jewish community leader. He served as an elected member of the Perth City Council on three occasions, presided over the Metropolitan Town Planning Commission and was the foundation president of the Town Planning Institute of Western Australia.

== Biography ==
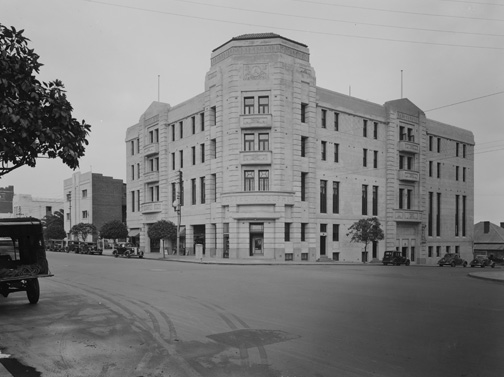
The Adelphi Hotel, 1936, designed by Harold Boas

=== Early life ===
Boas was born on 27 September 1883 in Adelaide, South Australia, the third son of noted Minister and Rabbi, Abraham Tobias Boas (1842–1923) and his wife Elizabeth, née Solomon. After being educated at Whinham College and Prince Alfred College he was apprenticed to architect Edward Davies between 1899 and 1904 and later studied at the South Australian School of Mines and Industries.

=== Move to Perth ===
In June 1905, he moved to Perth where he initially joined architects M. F. Cavanagh & Austin Bastow and later Oldham, Boas, Ednie-Brown & Partners with whom he stayed for many years.

On 29 March 1911, Boas married Sadie ("Sarah") Cohen at the Brisbane Street Synagogue in Perth.

In 1927, he invited his nephew, Harold Krantz, an architecture graduate, to leave Adelaide and join him in Perth to work at Oldham, Boas, Ednie-Brown & Partners. Krantz later became a notable architect in his own right.

=== Architecture ===
With his partners, Boas designed many public and private buildings around Perth including the open-aired King's Picture Theatre (1905), the Nedlands Park Hotel (1907), Radio station 6WF (1924), Edith Dircksey Cowan Memorial (1934), the Emu Brewery (1938), the Adelphi Hotel, London Court (1937), the Gledden Building (1938) and Temple David (1954, 1963, 1973).

=== Public life ===
Boas served on the Perth City Council during 1914–16, 1926–42 and 1944, representing the South Ward. He was chairman of the State government's Metropolitan Town Planning Commission from 1928 to 1930 and was a member of the Town Planning Association of Western Australia from 1914. Boas chaired the City of Perth's town planning committee in 1930–33 and 1938–42, and was foundation president of the Town Planning Institute of Western Australia in 1931. He was an inaugural member of the State division of the Town Planning Institute of Australia.

In 1932, Boas stood unsuccessfully for the Western Australian Legislative Council as an anti-secessionist candidate during the debate prior to the 1933 secession referendum.

He founded and edited the Australian Jewish Outlook, a short lived anti-Zionist monthly, in May 1947. However, the periodical went out of circulation after little more than a year as Boas had overestimated the level of support for it.

He was president of the local branch of the United Nations Association, representing Australia and the Executive Council of Australian Jewry at the United Nations conference in Bangkok in 1950.

British businessman and property developer Alistair McAlpine (1942–2014) writes of meeting Boas in the 1960s:

One afternoon, Peter Arney took me to meet his retired partner, Harold Boas (..) Boas explained to me that it was only 30 years since he had designed the Adelphi Hotel and now I was going to pull it down. He believed that to pull down this fine old hotel was a shame and, as I reflect on the matter, I am inclined to agree with him in his judgement with, however, one caveat. I believe that to have pulled down that wonderful hotel was, in fact, a crime–among the first of a succession of crimes that systematically destroyed St Georges Terrace.

=== Later life ===
In 1969, he was awarded an OBE in 1969 for service to town planning and to the Jewish community in Perth.

Boas died at Subiaco on 17 September 1980.

== Honours ==
The Harold Boas Gardens in West Perth (formerly known as "Delhi Square" up to 1975–76) are named in his honour.
