= Abraham Tobias Boas =

South Australian rabbi

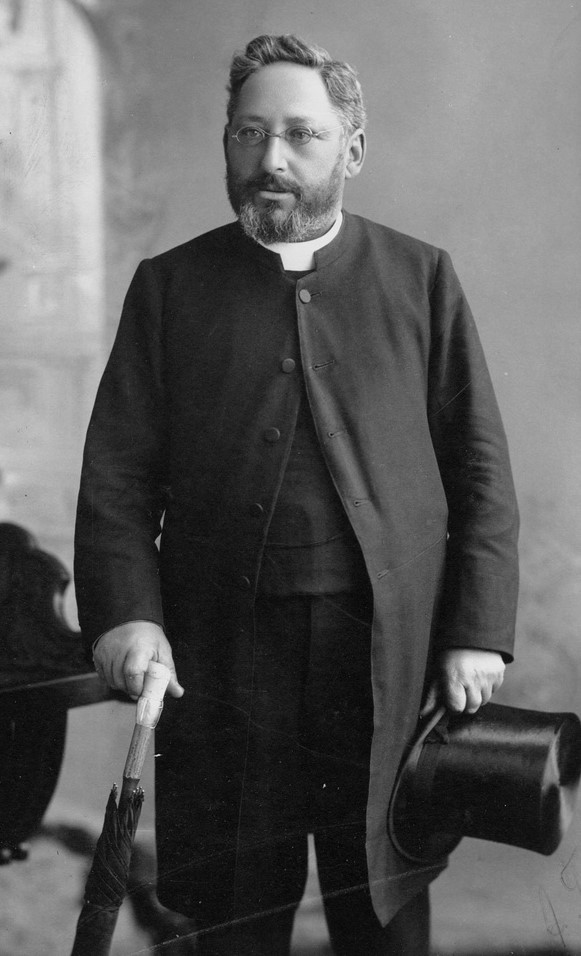
- Born: 25 November 1842; Amsterdam, the Netherlands
- Died: 20 February 1923 (aged 80)
- Education: Amsterdam Theological Seminary
- Occupation: Rabbi
- Spouse: Elizabeth (Solomon) Boas
- Children: 4 sons, including Lionel and Harold; 5 daughters
- Parent(s): Tobias Eliesar Boas; Eva Salomon (Linse) Levi
- Relatives: Isaac Solomon (father-in-law); Harold Krantz (grandson)

Abraham Tobias Boas (25 November 1842 – 20 February 1923) was a Dutch-born Australian rabbi who led the Adelaide Hebrew Congregation in Adelaide, South Australia. He is commemorated on Adelaide's Jubilee 150 Walkway as South Australia's first rabbi.

== Biography ==
=== Early life ===
Abraham Tobias Boas was born in Amsterdam, the Netherlands, son of Tobias Eliesar Boas, rabbi, and his wife Eva Salomon Levi, née Linse. Boas was educated at Amsterdam Theological Seminary.

=== Ministry in Adelaide ===
In late 1869 a committee acting under the authority of Nathan Marcus Adler, Chief Rabbi of the British Empire, chose Boas for the vacant ministry of the Adelaide Hebrew Congregation. The voyage out to South Australia, aboard the sailing ship Tamesa under Captain Phillips, took 83 days. He preached his first Adelaide sermon six days later.

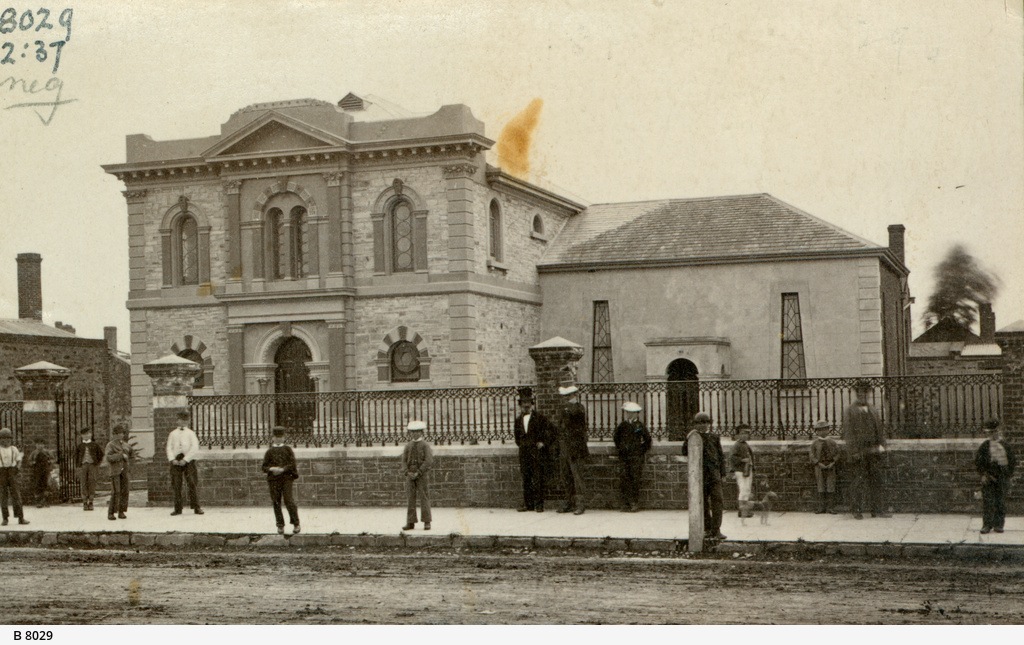
Adelaide Hebrew Congregation off Rundle Street, north side in Synagogue Place, 1871.

The Adelaide Hebrew Congregation was then building a new synagogue in Rundle Street, its foundation stone laid in 1870 by the president, Gabriel Bennett, with whose family Boas boarded until his marriage. Boas consecrated the completed building, which seated 350 worshippers, on 20 March 1871.

Over the following decades the congregation's schools, societies and charities all ran through him. He served as headmaster of the Sabbath and Sunday schools, which by 1895 enrolled more than eighty pupils, and presided over bodies including the Jewish Literary Society and the Jewish Choristers' Club. In 1907 he founded the Adelaide Chevra Kadisha (Jewish burial society) and became its first chairman.

His pastoral reach extended far outside South Australia. He travelled to Western Australia to open synagogues and schools in Perth, Fremantle and Coolgardie.

On his seventieth birthday in 1912, the congregation presented Boas with an illuminated address in recognition of his service. By 1914 no officiating Jewish clergyman in Australasia was older than Boas, and none anywhere in the British Empire had served a congregation longer.

His wife died in September 1916, and his own health then failed. A stroke left him partly incapacitated, and in 1918 he resigned his ministry after 48 years, succeeded by the Rev. I. A. Bernstein. When Chief Rabbi Joseph H. Hertz visited Adelaide in March 1921 during his tour of the dominions, he paid tribute to Boas's fifty years of influence on the congregation and conferred on Boas the formal title of rabbi.

=== Personal life ===
On 15 May 1873 he married Elizabeth Solomon (c. 1851 – 26 September 1916), a daughter of Isaac Solomon (1818–1901) of Adelaide's influential family, and was survived by four sons, including Lionel (1875–1949) and Harold (1883–1980), and five daughters.

=== Death ===
Boas died at his home on Gover Street, on 20 February 1923. He was buried in West Terrace Cemetery, Adelaide. At the Adelaide City Council the then Lord Mayor, Lewis Cohen, called him "a gentleman of learning and culture", and the council resolved to convey its sympathy to the family.

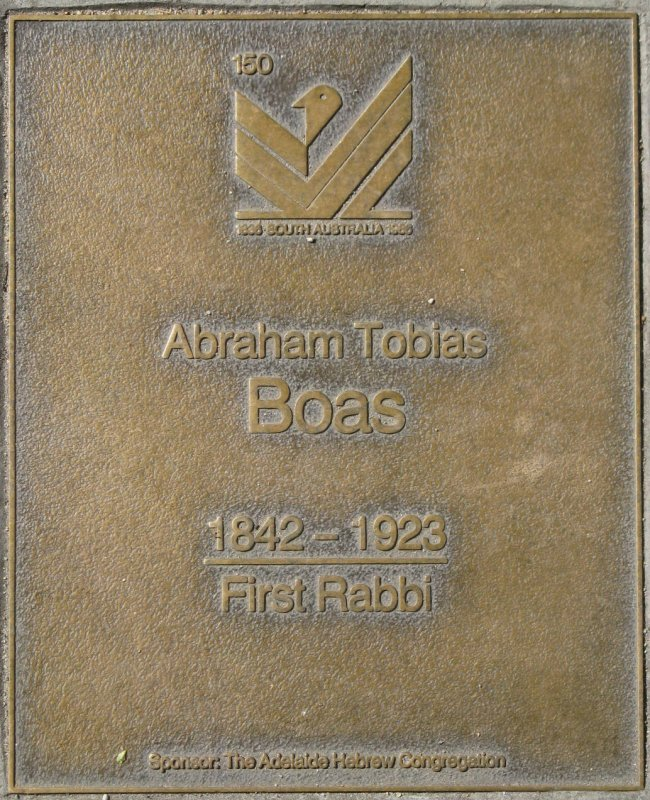
Jubilee 150 Walkway plaque on North Terrace.

In 1986 a bronze plaque commemorating Boas as South Australia's first rabbi, sponsored by the Adelaide Hebrew Congregation, was installed on the Jubilee 150 Walkway on North Terrace.
