= Lionel Boas =

Australian mayor

- Born: 21 October 1875; Adelaide, South Australia
- Died: 16 August 1949 (aged 73)
- Occupation: Public official
- Spouses: Annie Bertha Henshaw (m. 1902–1933); Florence Olney (m. 1934–1949)
- Children: 1
- Parent: Abraham Tobias Boas (father)
- Relatives: Harold Boas (brother); Harold Krantz (nephew)

Lionel Tobias Boas (1875 – 16 August 1949) was a prominent public official from Western Australia.

== Biography ==
=== Early life ===
Lionel Tobias Boas was born in 1875 in South Australia. His father was Rabbi Abraham Boas (1844–1923). He was the older brother to the architect, Harold Boas.

=== Career ===
He moved to Perth, Western Australia, in 1896. A decade later, in 1906, he was elected a councillor to the City of Subiaco, serving for thirty-six years and was mayor of Subiaco from 1917 to 1920. With Jack Simons, he helped establish the Young Australia League in 1905 and served as its president until his death in 1949.
