= Lady Castlereagh (1803 EIC ship) =

Ship launched in 1803

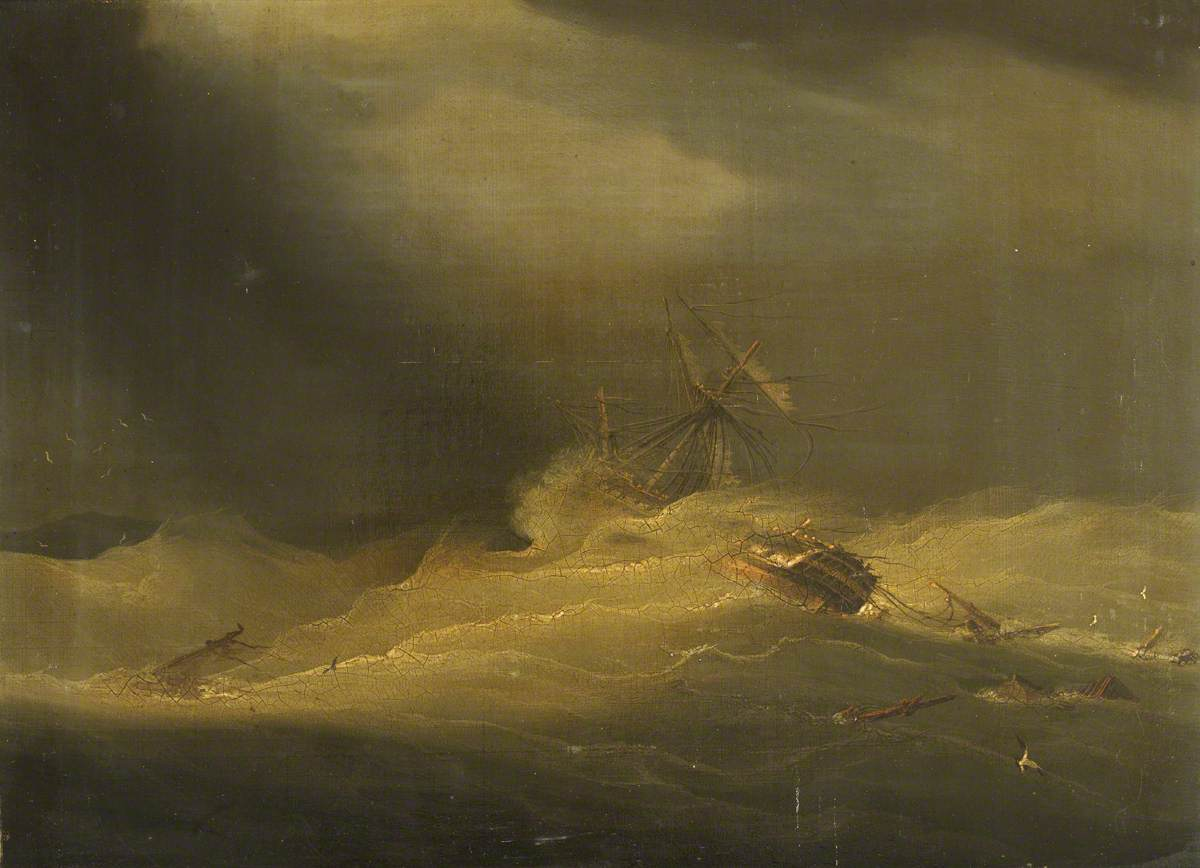
- The Lady Castlereagh dismasted in a cyclone off Madras, 24 October 1818

History

United Kingdom
- Name: Lady Castlereagh
- Namesake: Lady Castlereagh
- Owner: EIC voyages #1–3:Henry Callender; EIC voyage #4:Miss Jane Chrystie; EIC voyages #5–7:William Hamilton; 1817:Robinson
- Builder: Randall, Rotherhithe
- Launched: 8 January 1803
- Fate: Condemned and sold for breaking up October 1818

General characteristics
- Tons burthen: 821, 8218/94, or 847, or 848 (bm)
- Length: Overall:146 ft 5 1/2 in (44.6 m); Keel:118 ft 10 in (36.2 m)
- Beam: 36 ft 0 1/2 in (11.0 m)
- Depth of hold: 14 ft 9 1/2 in (4.5 m)
- Complement: 1803:101; 1805:101; 1809:101; 1811:120
- Armament: 1803:27 × 18-pounder carronades; 1805:27 × 18-pounder carronades; 1809:27 × 18-pounder carronades; 1811:26 × 18-pounder guns

Lady Castlereagh was launched in 1803. She made six apparently uneventful voyages to India and one to China for the British East India Company (EIC). She left the EIC's service and made one voyage transporting convicts to Australia. She was returning from having delivered her convicts to Port Jackson and Van Diemen's Land when she was damaged in October 1818 a gale at Madras. She was surveyed there, condemned, and sold for breaking up.

== Career ==
=== 1st EIC voyage (1803−1804) ===
Captain William Edmeades (or Edmeader) acquired a letter of marque on 16 July 1803, i.e., it was issued after he had already sailed from the Downs on 6 April, bound for Bengal. Lady Castlereagh reached Madeira on 27 April and arrived at Diamond Harbour on 14 September. Homeward bound, she was at Saugor on 18 February, and Bencoolen on 13 May. She reached St Helena on 14 August. Homeward bound, she left St Helena on 10 September in company with the whalers Cornwall and Ocean. Lady Castlereagh arrived back at the Downs on 8 November.

=== 2nd EIC voyage (1805−1806) ===
Captain Thomas Garland Murray acquired a letter of marque on 15 March 1805. He sailed from Portsmouth on 25 April 1805, bound for St Helena and Bengal. Lady Castlereagh reached St Helena on 20 July and arrived at Diamond Harbour on 10 December. Homeward bound, she was at Saugor on 23 January 1806, reached St Helena on 15 May, and arrived back at the Downs on 18 July.

=== 3rd EIC voyage (1807−1808) ===
Captain Murray sailed from Portsmouth on 18 April 1807, bound for Madras and Bengal. Lady Castlereagh reached Madras on 9 September and arrived at Diamond Harbour on 28 November. Homeward bound, she was at Saugor on 16 January 1808, reached St Helena on 12 June, and arrived back at the Downs on 14 August.

=== 4th EIC voyage (1809−1810) ===
Captain William Hamilton acquired a letter of marque on 19 January 1809. He sailed from Portsmouth on 22 February, bound for St Helena and Bengal. Lady Castlereagh reached St Helena on 8 May and arrived at Diamond Harbour on 18 August. Homeward bound, she was at Saugor on 30 October and sailed down the west coast of India, reaching Vizagapatam on 31 December and Madras on 13 January 1810. she was at St Helena on 3 May and arrived at the Downs on 6 July.

=== 5th EIC voyage (1811−1813) ===
Captain George Simpson acquired a letter of marque on 11 May 1811. He sailed from Torbay on 30 May 1811, bound for Bengal. Lady Castlereagh reached Madeira on 21 June. On 11 November she grounded at Kedgeree and was ordered to go up to Calcutta to go into dock. and arrived at Calcutta on 16 December. Homeward bound, she was at Saugor on 15 April 1812. From there she sailed to Bencoolen, which she reached on 9 June, and Madras, which she reached on 22 August. She was at the Cape of Good Hope on 25 December, reached St Helena on 26 January 1813, and arrived at the Downs on 13 May.

=== 6th EIC voyage (1814−1815) ===
Captain Simpson sailed from Portsmouth on 8 June 1814, bound for Bengal. Lady Castlereagh reached Madeira on 23 June and arrived at Saugor on 28 November. Homeward bound, she was at Madras on 21 February 1815 and Colombo on 23 March. She was at the Cape on 31 May, reached St Helena on 5 July, and arrived at the Downs on 19 September.

=== 7th EIC voyage (1816−1817) ===
Captain Simpson sailed from Plymouth on 20 March 1816, bound for St Helena and China. Lady Castlereagh reached St Helena on 28 May and Batavia on 5 September, before arriving at Whampoa Anchorage on 2 November. Homeward bound, she crossed the Second Bar on 22 January 1817, reached st Helena on 10 April, and arrived at the Downs on 6 June.

=== Convict transport ===
In 1817 Lady Castlereagh was sold. Lloyd's Register for 1818 showed her with Welton, master, Robinson, owner, and trade London–New South Wales.

Captain George Weltden sailed from England on 22 December 1817. Lady Castlereagh arrived at Port Jackson on 26 April 1818 and landed 39 convicts. She sailed on 4 May to Hobart where she arrived on 11 June. She had embarked 300 male convicts and landed the remaining 261 at Hobart.

== Fate ==
Lady Castlereagh left Hobart on 26 May and returned to Port Jackson. There she embarked 150 men from the 46th Regiment of Foot for Madras. She arrived at Madras on 12 September. A gale on 24 October caused her to slip her cable and put out to sea. She was seen the next morning to have lost her foremast. A gale on 25 October dismasted her and she was so damaged that she was condemned. She was surveyed at Madras, condemned, and sold for breaking up.
