= Emanuel Solomon =

Australian businessman and politician

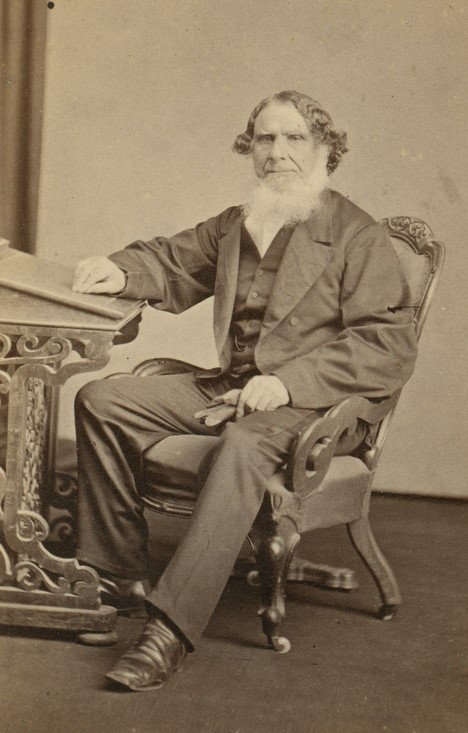

Member of the South Australian House of Assembly for West Adelaide
- In office 1862–1865

Member of the South Australian Legislative Council
- In office 1867–1871

Personal details
- Born: 1800 London, England
- Died: 3 October 1873 (aged 72–73) Adelaide, South Australia, Australia
- Resting place: West Terrace Cemetery
- Relations: Judah Moss Solomon, nephew

Emanuel Solomon (1800–3 October 1873) was a businessman and politician in the early days of the Colony of South Australia, representing the seat of West Adelaide in the South Australian Legislative Assembly from 1862 to 1865. He is the brother of Vaiben Solomon and son of Samuel Moss Solomon.

== History ==
Emanuel was born in London, a son of Samuel Moss Solomon (c. 1769 – 13 May 1842) and his first wife Elizabeth née Moses (c. 1772–c. 1814). He and his brother Vaiben Solomon (1802 – 21 June 1860) were transported to Sydney and served time for larceny, arriving on 1 May 1818 aboard the Lady Castlereagh.

He arrived in South Australia in 1837 and was one of the founders of the Adelaide Hebrew Congregation.

In 1840 he founded the Queen's Theatre, Adelaide with brother Vaiben and occasional involvement of nephew Judah Moss Solomon (1818–1880), father of Vaiben Louis Solomon.

Vaiben and Emanuel Solomon were agents for the brig Dorset, Captain David Walsh (died 1851), owner Charles Smith, from 1839 to 1842, and from 1843 dedicated to their exclusive use, perhaps ownership, to at least 1847. Dorset was highly regarded, with superior cabin accommodation, and besides her commercial involvement was often used for family transportation between Sydney and Adelaide.

In 1848 he and Matthew Smith purchased 85 acres (34 ha) of land on Spencer Gulf and subdivided it as a township to be known as Port Pirie. Little development occurred on site and by the late 1860s there were only three woolsheds on the riverfront. It was later re-surveyed and became Port Pirie's suburb Solomontown, commonly referred to as "Solly". Solomon had reserved a parcel of land for a synagogue, but was never taken up by the few Jews in Port Pirie. A clause in his will left it to whatever denomination should erect a building there, which offer was taken up by the Bible Christians, who transported a surplus building to the site.

Solomon is commemorated for the generosity he extended to Mary MacKillop. In November 1871 he gave the Sisters of St. Joseph, who had been evicted from their convent, a house rent free.

In December 1871 he hosted a reception for 500 early settlers of South Australia to celebrate the 35th anniversary of the foundation of the colony. Photographer Henry Jones took photographs of most if not all of those who were invited to attend. He presented a large composite photograph to Solomon, and in 1910 another was purchased from Jones by T. R. Bowman and donated to the Public Library for display in the entrance foyer.

== Politics ==
He was elected to the seat of West Adelaide in the South Australian Legislative Assembly in November 1862, with James Crabb Verco as his colleague, and resigned in 1865. He was elected to the Legislative Council in 1867 and retired in September 1871.

== Family ==
He married fellow convict Mary Ann Wilson on 6 November 1826. On 12 April 1844 he married Cecilia Adelaide Smith ( – 24 July 1852) who died in Sydney; that same year he married a third time, to Catherine Abrahams (c. 1819 – 2 July 1901). Their children included:

- Elizabeth Dorseta Solomon (c. 1839 – 16 February 1914) married her cousin Samuel Israel Myers on 24 November 1858. (She had been the focus of a court case against Townsend Duryea amongst others in regards to an alleged conspiracy to elope to Melbourne with John Holthouse Pierce in 1855.)
- Rosetta Solomon ( – 24 December 1901) married Joel Moss on 5 July 1865, lived at "Westwood", Glebe Point, New South Wales.
- Joseph Samuel Solomon (8 July 1846 – 4 September 1940) married Miriam Solomon (died 6 December 1921), the eldest daughter of Abraham Jacob Solomon (c. 1825–1889), on 25 November 1868. They lived at Walkerville Terrace, Walkerville.
- Julia Solomon (c. 1844 – January or February 1881) married Victor Voules Brown on 24 January 1864. She died in Darwin.
- Catherine Leah Solomon (c. 1848 – 4 July 1897) married Louis Victorsen of Clare on 27 May 1874 at the residence of J. S Solomon, Buxton St, North Adelaide.
- Vaiben Joel Solomon (27 November 1854 – 27 January 1936) married Dora Muhr on 25 July 1877

His oldest brother Moss Solomon (c. 1796 – 3 February 1849) was father of Judah Moss Solomon and grandfather of Vaiben Louis Solomon.
