= Judah Moss Solomon =

Australian politician

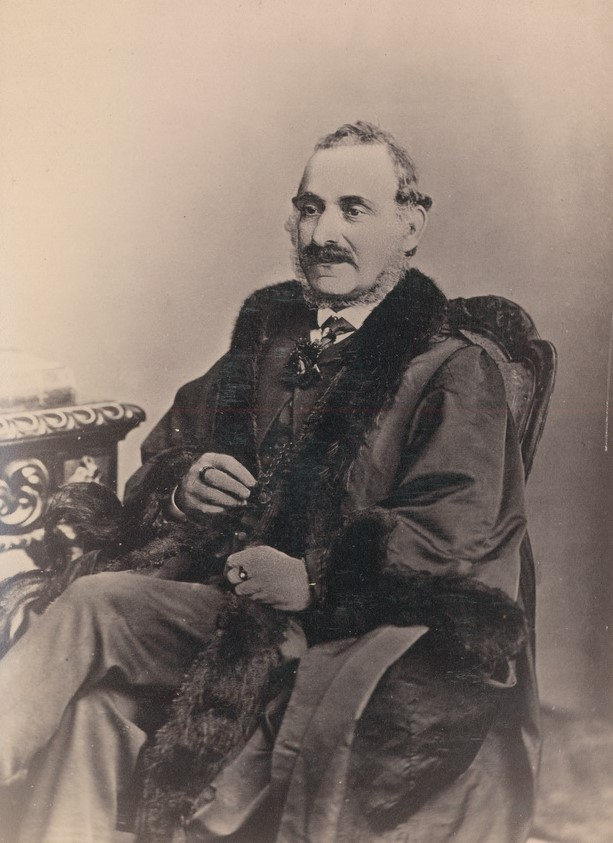
Solomon c. 1880

Judah Moss Solomon (21 December 1818 – 29 August 1880) was a successful businessman, Mayor of Adelaide and member of both houses of South Australian Parliament.

== History ==
Solomon was born in London to Jewish parents Moss Samuel Solomon (c. 1796–1849) and his first wife Elizabeth née Myers, (c. 1799–c. 1825). He emigrated to Sydney around 1831 and was educated at Sydney College, which later became the University of Sydney, then for several years was employed by his uncles V. & E. Solomon as supercargo on their vessels, which traded around Australia and nearby islands, and in that capacity first visited Adelaide on 20 October 1839, in the barque Strathisla with a cargo of 99 Timor Ponies, 50 being for South Australia. He worked for his uncle Isaac Solomon (1816/18–1901) as government auctioneers in Sydney, then in 1842 moved to Moreton Bay (now Brisbane, Queensland), where he was appointed Government Auctioneer, and conducted the first sale of township allotments.

In 1846 he moved to Adelaide, where he founded the auctioneering firm E. Solomon & Co. in conjunction with Emanuel Solomon (1800–1873) and Isaac Solomon (1816/18–1901). He was in England from 1854 to 1857, hoping to regain his failing health. E. Solomon & Co. was dissolved around this time and he set up in business on his own account, which he pursued until a few years before his death.

== Politics ==
J. M. Solomon was elected an alderman for the Adelaide City Council in 1852, and held that position until late 1854, when he resigned, and John Lazar won the ensuing by-election. In December 1869 he was elected Mayor, to which office he was returned unopposed the following year.

No matter what position he undertook, he devoted himself heart and mind to the mastering of its requirements, and he was never satisfied till he had investigated even to the minutest details every thing which might be brought before him. This quality, united to singular clear-headedness, a close insight into figures, fluency of speech, remarkable tact in administration, and consideration for his subordinates, caused him as mayor to be essentially the right man in the right place.

He organised a conference of South Australian mayors to discuss nuisances over which their municipalities had no control. This led to the Public Health Act now in force. He appointed a committee to solve the problem of diseased meat, which was then said to be sold in the city. He agitated for the Government to install deep drainage, and the recommendations of the committee which was then formed were largely implemented. When the various Waterworks Acts were being consolidated, Solomon gave evidence to the Select Committee which showed that the corporation was being overcharged for water. The Victoria Bridge was opened during his term of office.

He was elected to the South Australian House of Assembly for the City of Adelaide on 16 September 1858, retiring in March 1860. Solomon was then a member of the South Australian Legislative Council from 28 March 1861 to 28 August 1866. He returned to the Lower House in December 1871 representing West Adelaide, with W. K. Simms as his colleague, serving until February 1875. He was an ardent supporter of Free Trade, but had limited success as a politician due to his fixity of purpose: once his mind was made up, no compromise was possible.

== Other interests ==
He sat on the Destitute Board for many years, and succeeded Mr. Reed as Chairman in March 1877. He was a great advocate of the boarding out system, and frequently travelled about the country to see that the foster-parents and guardians of the destitute children had proper regard for their welfare.

He was one of the oldest Justices of the Peace in the colony, and succeeded Rupert Ingleby as Coroner.

He was of the Jewish faith, but held broad-minded social and political views. He was the first President of the Adelaide Hebrew Congregation, and later often acted in that position.

He was a great supporter of J. L. Young's Adelaide Educational Institution, where many of his sons were educated.

== Family ==
Solomon (1818–1880) married twice: to Rachel Cohen (1819 – 9 January 1864) on 7 August 1842, then on 4 September 1867 to Adela Pulver (c. 1844 – 21 September 1875). He and Rachel had sixteen children, of whom seven survived him, notably:

- Moss Judah Solomon (15 June 1843 – 11 February 1933), auctioneer, married cousin Anna Benjamin (c. 1842 – 24 October 1894) on 13 September 1865. He married again, in 1895, to Fanny Bennett (c. 1857 – 7 June 1927), daughter of Gabriel Bennett.
- (Colonel) Benjamin Solomon (3 Nov 1844 – 18 September 1922), prominent member of Volunteer Militia, married Louise (or Louisa) Lee on 27 February 1867.
- Vaiben Louis Solomon (13 May 1853 – 20 October 1908), Premier of South Australia, married the widow Mary Ann Bridgland (née Wigzell) (c. June 1856 – 7 January 1885) on 6 December 1880; he married again, to Alice Cohen ( – 19 May 1954) of Richmond, Victoria, on 22 July 1896.
- Selena Sarah (or Sara) "Lena" Solomon (d. 18 September 1939) married Henry Louis Harris M.B. (d. 4 April 1927) on 30 March 1881.

Adela had two children by him: Elias in 1870 and Rosetta on 8 September 1871, of whom no trace has been found. Solomon died of cancer in Adelaide, South Australia on 29 August 1880.

Note: Confusingly, at least three other South Australian descendants of Samuel Moss Solomon were named Judah Moss Solomon: two, Judah Moss Solomon BA LLB (1857–1925), later Solomon-Senior, and J. Moss Solomon BA LLB (1869–1949), were lawyers who practised independently around the same time and were removed from the rolls a few years apart for separate transgressions.

Political offices
Preceded by Henry Fuller	Mayor of the Corporation of Adelaide; 1866–1869	Succeeded by Adolph Bartels
