= 1st Parliament of South Australia =

1857–1860 meeting of the South Australian Parliament

First Parliament of South Australia
2nd	→
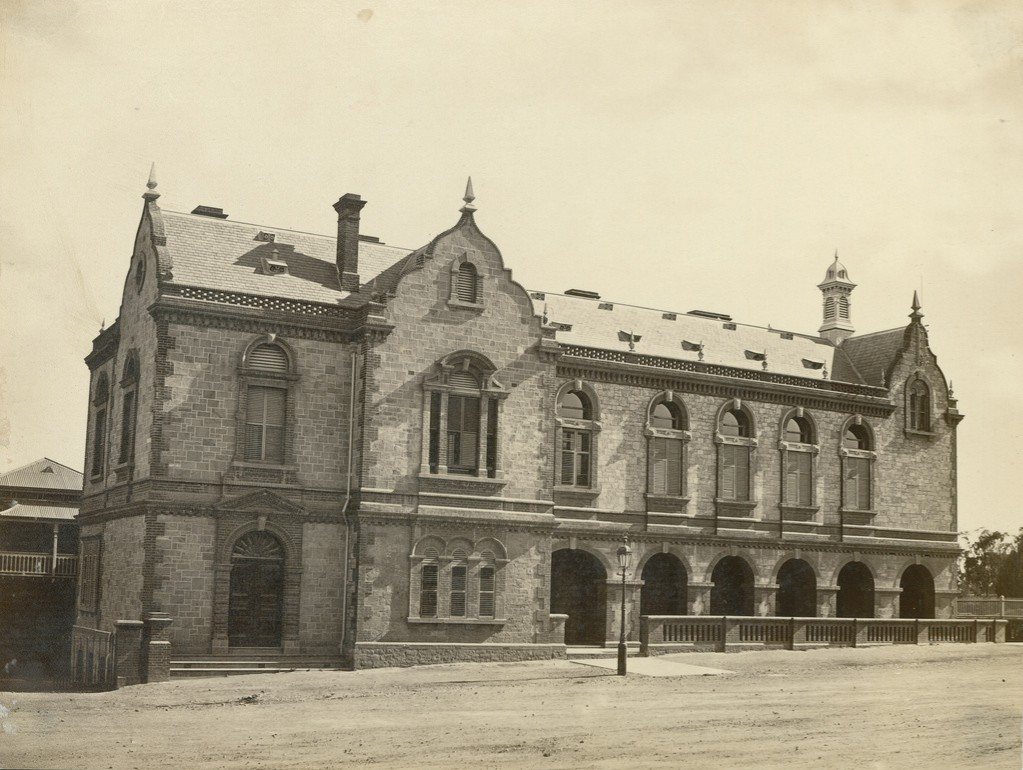
- Old Parliament House (1872)

Overview
- Legislative body: Parliament of South Australia
- Meeting place: Old Parliament House
- Term: 22 April 1857 – 1 March 1860
- Election: 9 March 1857

Legislative Council
- Members: 18
- President: James Hurtle Fisher

House of Assembly
- Members: 36
- Speaker: George Strickland Kingston

Sessions
- 1st: 22 April 1857 – 27 January 1858
- 2nd: 27 August 1858 – 24 December 1858
- 3rd: 29 April 1859 – 1 September 1859

The 1st Parliament of South Australia was a meeting of the legislative branch of the South Australian state government, composed of the South Australian Legislative Council and the South Australian House of Assembly.

== Leadership ==
Legislative Council

- President of the Legislative Council: James Hurtle Fisher
- Clerk of the Legislative Council: Francis Corbet Singleton
- Clerk's assistant and Sergeant-at-arms: Joseph George Atkinson Branthwaite

House of Assembly

- Speaker of the House of Assembly: George Strickland Kingston
- Clerk of the House of Assembly: George William de la Poer Beresford
- Clerk's assistant and Sargeant-at-arms: James Newnham Blackmore

== Membership ==
=== Legislative Council ===
All 18 seats in the upper house were contested in the election on 9 March 1857.

▌ George Fife Angas
▌ Henry Ayers
▌ Charles Hervey Bagot
▌ John Baker
▌ Samuel Davenport
▌ Charles Davies
▌ Charles George Everard
▌ James Hurtle Fisher
▌ Arthur Henry Freeling

▌ Anthony Forster
▌ Edward Castres Gwynne
▌ George Hall
▌ John Morphett
▌ Thomas Shuldham O'Halloran
▌ Abraham Scott
▌ William Scott
▌ Edward Stirling
▌ William Younghusband

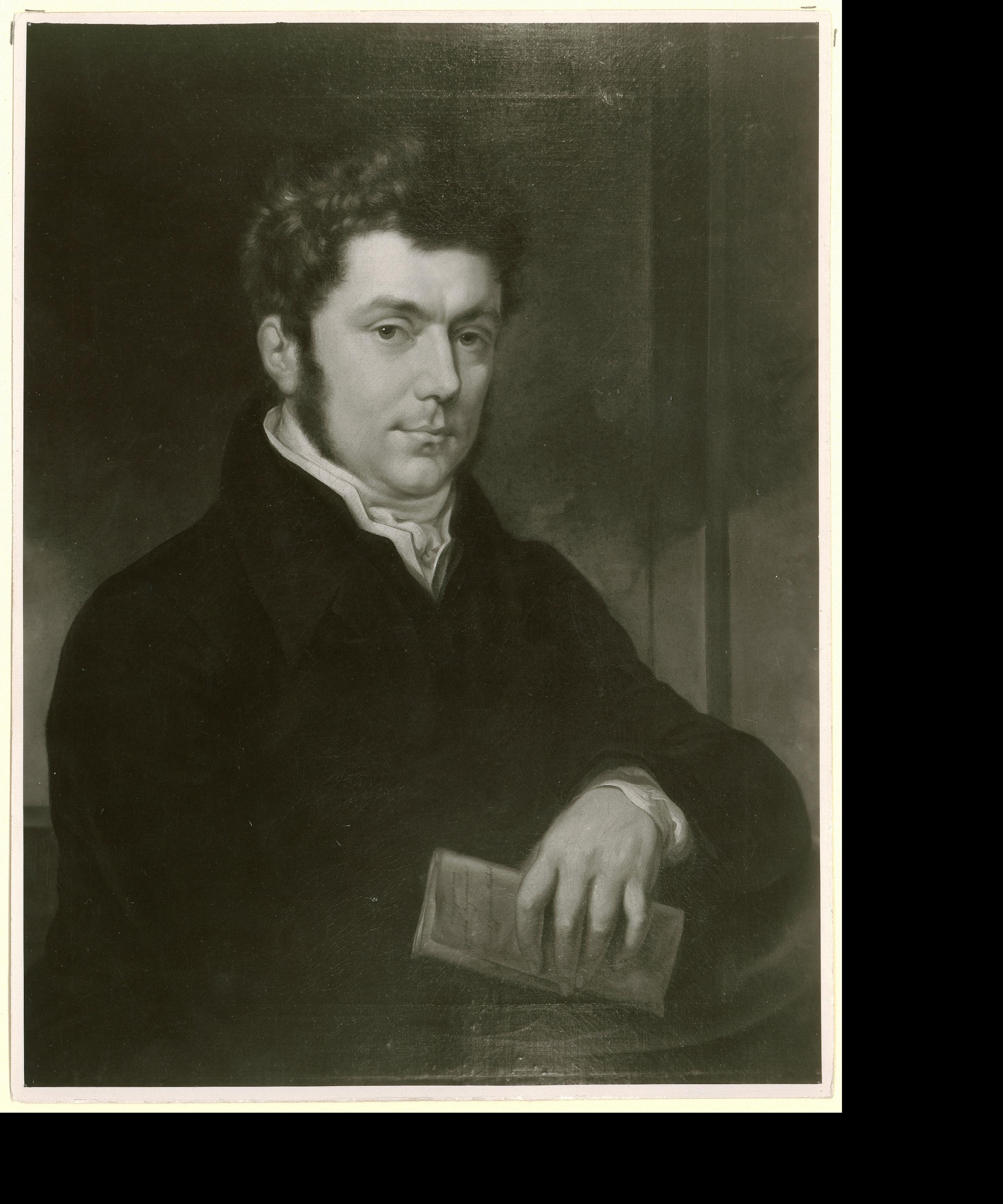
Legislative Council President
James Hurtle Fisher

=== House of Assembly ===
All 36 seats in the lower house were contested in the election on 9 March 1857.

City of Adelaide

▌ Francis Stacker Dutton
▌ Boyle Travers Finniss
▌ Richard Davies Hanson
▌ John Bentham Neales
▌ William Owen
▌ Judah Moss Solomon

Barossa

▌ William Bakewell
▌ Walter Duffield

The Burra and Clare

▌ George Strickland Kingston
▌ Edward McEllister
▌ Edward John Peake

East Torrens

▌ John Henry Barrow
▌ Lavington Glyde

Encounter Bay

▌ Arthur Fydell Lindsay
▌ Henry Bull Templer Strangways

Flinders

▌ Marshall MacDermott

Gumeracha

▌ Arthur Blyth
▌ Alexander Hay

Light

▌ John Tuthill Bagot
▌ David Shannon

Mount Barker

▌ John Dunn, sen.
▌ William Rogers

The Murray

▌ David Wark

Noarlunga

▌ Henry Mildred
▌ Thomas Young

Onkaparinga

▌ William Milne
▌ William Townsend

Port Adelaide

▌ Edward Gascoigne Collinson
▌ John Hart

The Sturt

▌ John Hallett
▌ Thomas Reynolds

Victoria

▌ George Charles Hawker

West Torrens

▌ James William Cole
▌ Luther Scammell

Yatala

▌ Richard Bullock Andrews
▌ John Harvey

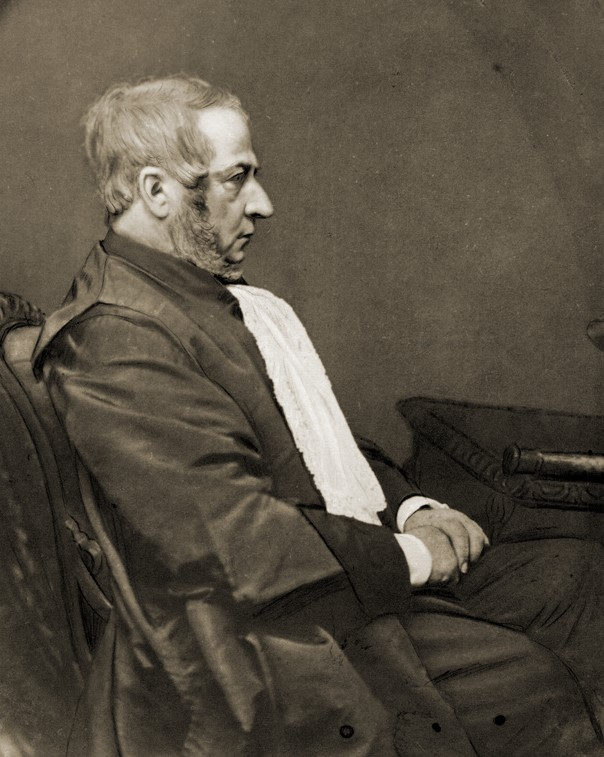
House of Assembly Speaker
George Strickland Kingston

== Changes in membership ==
=== Legislative Council ===
Before	Change		After	
Member	Type	Date	Date	Member
Arthur Henry Freeling	Resigned	30 August 1859		Vacant
Edward Castres Gwynne	Failure to attend	30 August 1859		Vacant

=== House of Assembly ===
Seat	Before	Change		After	
Seat	Member	Type	Date	Date	Member
Barossa	Horace Dean	Unseated	7 May 1857	13 June 1857	William Bakewell
Yatala	Charles Simeon Hare	Resigned	12 May 1857	5 June 1857	Richard Bullock Andrews
East Torrens	George Marsden Waterhouse	Resigned	8 September 1857	6 October 1857	Lavington Glyde
Onkaparinga	William Bower Dawes	Resigned	24 November 1857	23 December 1857	William Townsend
Victoria	Robert Rowland Leake	Resigned	8 December 1857	5 January 1858	George Charles Hawker
Encounter Bay	Benjamin Herschel Babbage	Resigned	17 December 1857	15 January 1858	Henry Bull Templer Strangways
Light	Carrington Smedley	Resigned	23 December 1857	8 February 1858	William Henry Maturin
East Torrens	Charles Bonney	Resigned	26 January 1858	6 April 1858	John Henry Barrow
Mount Barker	Friedrich Eduard Heinrich Wulf Krichauff	Resigned	12 March 1858	16 September 1858	William Rogers
City of Adelaide	Robert Richard Torrens	Accepted office of profit	1 July 1858	16 September 1858	Judah Moss Solomon
Light	William Henry Maturin	Accepted office of profit	1 July 1858	9 September 1858	David Shannon
The Burra and Clare	Morris Lyon Marks	Resigned	2 August 1858	9 September 1858	Edward McEllister
Port Adelaide	John Bristow Hughes	Resigned	24 September 1858	11 October 1858	Edward Gascoigne Collinson
City of Adelaide	William Henville Burford	Resigned	29 April 1859	13 May 1859	William Owen
Port Adelaide	John Hart, sen.	Absent without leave	23 August 1859		Vacant
Flinders	Marshall MacDermott	Accepted office of profit	1 September 1859		Vacant
The Burra and Clare	Edward John Peake	Accepted office of profit	1 October 1859		Vacant

== See also ==
- Members of the South Australian Legislative Council, 1857–1861
- Members of the South Australian House of Assembly, 1857–1860
