= List of South Australian House of Assembly by-elections =

This is a list of by-elections and scheduled by-elections for the South Australian House of Assembly.

A by-election may be held when a member's seat becomes vacant through resignation, death or some other reasons. These vacancies are called casual vacancies.

Gains for Labor are highlighted in red; for Liberal and its predecessors in blue; and others in grey.

== 2020–2029 ==
Parl.	By-election	Date	Incumbent	Party	Winner	Party	Cause	Retained
55th	Black	16 November 2024	David Speirs	Liberal	Alex Dighton	Labor	Resignation	No
55th	Dunstan	23 March 2024	Steven Marshall	Liberal	Cressida O'Hanlon	Labor	Resignation	No
55th	Bragg	2 July 2022	Vickie Chapman	Liberal	Jack Batty	Liberal	Resignation	Yes

== 2010–2019 ==
Parl.	By-election	Date	Incumbent	Party	Winner	Party	Cause	Retained
54th	Cheltenham	9 February 2019	Jay Weatherill	Labor	Joe Szakacs	Labor	Resignation	Yes
54th	Enfield	9 February 2019	John Rau	Labor	Andrea Michaels	Labor	Resignation	Yes
53rd	Davenport	31 January 2015	Iain Evans	Liberal	Sam Duluk	Liberal	Resignation	Yes
53rd	Fisher	6 December 2014	Bob Such	Independent	Nat Cook	Labor	Death	No
52nd	Ramsay	11 February 2012	Mike Rann	Labor	Zoe Bettison	Labor	Resignation	Yes
52nd	Port Adelaide	11 February 2012	Kevin Foley	Labor	Susan Close	Labor	Resignation	Yes

== 2000–2009 ==
Parl.	By-election	Date	Incumbent	Party	Winner	Party	Cause	Retained
51st	Frome	17 January 2009	Rob Kerin	Liberal	Geoff Brock	Independent	Resignation	No

== 1990–1999 ==
Parl.	By-election	Date	Incumbent	Party	Winner	Party	Cause	Retained
48th	Taylor	5 November 1994	Lynn Arnold	Labor	Trish White	Labor	Resignation	Yes
48th	Torrens	7 May 1994	Joe Tiernan	Liberal	Robyn Geraghty	Labor	Death	No
48th	Elizabeth	9 April 1994	Martyn Evans	Labor	Lea Stevens	Labor	Resignation (entered HoR)	Yes
47th	Kavel	9 May 1992	Roger Goldsworthy	Liberal	John Olsen	Liberal	Resignation to provide Olsen a seat.	Yes
47th	Alexandra	9 May 1992	Ted Chapman	Liberal	Dean Brown	Liberal	Resignation to provide Brown a seat.	Yes
47th	Custance	23 June 1990	John Olsen	Liberal	Ivan Venning	Liberal	Resignation (entered Senate)	Yes

== 1980–1989 ==
Parl.	By-election	Date	Incumbent	Party	Winner	Party	Cause	Retained
45th	Elizabeth	1 December 1984	Peter Duncan	Labor	Martyn Evans	Independent Labor	Resignation (entered HoR)	No
45th	Bragg	14 May 1983	David Tonkin	Liberal	Graham Ingerson	Liberal	Resignation	Yes
44th	Florey	4 September 1982	Harold O'Neill	Labor	Bob Gregory	Labor	Resignation (ill health)	Yes
44th	Mitcham	8 May 1982	Robin Millhouse	Democrats	Heather Southcott	Democrats	Resignation (Appointed to SA Supreme Court)	Yes
44th	Norwood	16 February 1980	Frank Webster	Liberal	Greg Crafter	Labor	Unseated	No

== 1970–1979 ==
Parl.	By-election	Date	Incumbent	Party	Winner	Party	Cause	Retained
43rd	Norwood	10 March 1979	Don Dunstan	Labor	Greg Crafter	Labor	Resignation (ill health)	Yes
41st	Goyder	8 June 1974	Steele Hall	Liberal Movement	David Boundy	Liberal Movement	Resignation (entered Senate)	Yes
41st	Semaphore	2 June 1973	Reg Hurst	Labor	Jack Olson	Labor	Death	Yes
40th	Adelaide	3 July 1971	Sam Lawn	Labor	Jack Wright	Labor	Death	Yes

== 1960–1969 ==
Parl.	By-election	Date	Incumbent	Party	Winner	Party	Cause	Retained
39th	Millicent	22 June 1968	Des Corcoran	Labor	Des Corcoran	Labor	Unseated	Yes
37th	Semaphore	3 October 1964	Harold Tapping	Labor	Reg Hurst	Labor	Death	Yes
37th	Stirling	28 September 1963	William Jenkins	LCL	William McAnaney	LCL	Death	Yes
37th	Yorke Peninsula	9 February 1963	Cecil Hincks	LCL	James Ferguson	LCL	Death	Yes
37th	Mount Gambier	15 December 1962	Ron Ralston	Labor	Allan Burdon	Labor	Death	Yes
36th	Frome	5 November 1960	Mick O'Halloran	Labor	Tom Casey	Labor	Death	Yes
36th	Light	23 April 1960	George Hambour	LCL	Leslie Nicholson	LCL	Death	Yes

== 1950–1959 ==
Parl.	By-election	Date	Incumbent	Party	Winner	Party	Cause	Retained
35th	Mount Gambier	12 July 1958	John Fletcher	Independent	Ron Ralston	Labor	Death	No
35th	Wallaroo	3 August 1957	Leslie Heath	LCL	Lloyd Hughes	Labor	Death	No
34th	Mitcham	7 May 1955	Henry Dunks	LCL	Robin Millhouse	LCL	Death	Yes
33rd	Stirling	18 October 1952	Herbert Dunn	LCL	William Jenkins	LCL	Death	Yes
33rd	Gawler	19 April 1952	Leslie Duncan	Labor	John Clark	Labor	Death	Yes
33rd	Flinders	2 June 1951	Rex Pearson	LCL	Glen Pearson	LCL	Resignation (entered Senate)	Yes

== 1940–1949 ==
Parl.	By-election	Date	Incumbent	Party	Winner	Party	Cause	Retained
32nd	Rocky River	26 February 1949	John Lyons	LCL	James Heaslip	LCL	Death	Yes
32nd	Alexandra	19 June 1948	Herbert Hudd	LCL	David Brookman	LCL	Death	Yes
31st	Port Pirie	19 October 1946	Andrew Lacey	Labor	Charles Davis	Labor	Death	Yes
31st	Semaphore	5 October 1946	Albert Thompson	Labor	Harold Tapping	Labor	Resignation (entered HoR)	Yes
31st	Burnside	22 June 1946	Charles Abbott	LCL	Geoffrey Clarke	LCL	Resignation	Yes
31st	Victoria	29 September 1945	Vernon Petherick	LCL	Jim Corcoran	Labor	Death	No
30th	Gouger	10 July 1943	Albert Robinson	Independent	Horace Bowden	Labor	Death	No
30th	Thebarton	12 December 1942	Jules Langdon	Independent	Fred Walsh	Labor	Death	No

== 1930–1939 ==
Parl.	By-election	Date	Incumbent	Party	Winner	Party	Cause	Retained
29th	Light	21 January 1939	Richard Layton Butler	LCL	Herbert Michael	LCL	Resignation (contested HoR)	Yes
28th	Port Pirie	3 March 1937	John Fitzgerald	Labor	William Threadgold	Labor	Death	Yes
28th	Wooroora	29 September 1934	Archie Cameron	LCL	Albert Robinson	Independent	Resignation (entered HoR)	No
28th	Alexandra	10 February 1934	George Laffer	LCL	George Connor	Independent	Death	No
28th	Barossa	8 July 1933	Herbert Basedow	Independent	Reginald Rudall	LCL	Death	No
27th	Victoria	5 March 1932	Peter Reidy	Liberal	Vernon Petherick	Liberal	Death	Yes
27th	Adelaide	25 July 1931	Bert Edwards	Labor	Martin Collaton	Lang Labor	Absent without leave	No

== 1920–1929 ==
Parl.	By-election	Date	Incumbent	Party	Winner	Party	Cause	Retained
26th	Port Adelaide	2 July 1927	Thomas Thompson	Protestant Labor	Thomas Thompson	Protestant Labor	Unseated	Yes
25th	Adelaide	21 September 1926	John Gunn	Labor	Herbert George	Labor	Resignation	Yes
25th	Stanley	16 March 1926	Henry Barwell	Liberal	John Lyons	Liberal	Resignation	Yes
25th	Yorke Peninsula	20 January 1926	Peter Allen	Liberal	Edward Giles	Liberal	Death	Yes
25th	East Torrens	28 November 1925	Harry Kneebone	Labor	Walter Hamilton	Liberal	Resignation (contested HoR)	No
25th	Port Adelaide	20 June 1925	John Price	Labor	John Stanley Verran	Labor	Resignation	Yes
25th	Barossa	22 November 1924	William Hague	Liberal	Henry Crosby	Liberal	Death	Yes
24th	Alexandra	20 January 1923	George Ritchie	Liberal	Percy Heggaton	Liberal	Resignation	Yes
23rd	Alexandra	12 June 1920	Archibald Peake	Liberal	Herbert Hudd	Liberal	Death	Yes

== 1910–1919 ==
Parl.	By-election	Date	Incumbent	Party	Winner	Party	Cause	Retained
22nd	Barossa	2 June 1917	Ephraim Coombe	Labor	Henry Crosby	Liberal	Death	No
22nd	East Torrens	12 May 1917	Lionel Hill	Labor	William Hamilton	Liberal	Resignation (contested Senate)	No
22nd	Adelaide	12 May 1917	John Gunn	Labor	Bert Edwards	Labor	Resignation (contested HoR)	Yes
22nd	Newcastle	12 May 1917	Thomas Butterfield	Labor	Edward Twopeny	Liberal	Resignation (contested Senate)	No
22nd	Alexandra	19 June 1915	Alexander McDonald	Liberal	Archibald Peake	Liberal	Resignation	Yes
21st	Alexandra	20 December 1913	William Blacker	Liberal	George Laffer	Liberal	Death	Yes
21st	Murray	23 November 1912	William Jamieson	Liberal	Harry Dove Young	Liberal	Death	Yes

== 1900–1909 ==
Parl.	By-election	Date	Incumbent	Party	Winner	Party	Cause	Retained
19th	Torrens	3 July 1909	Thomas Price	Labor	Thomas Ryan	Labor	Death	Yes
19th	Wooroora	13 February 1909	Friedrich Wilhelm Paech	ANL	Frederick William Young	FPPU	Death	No
19th	Northern Territory	5 December 1908	Vaiben Louis Solomon	ANL	Thomas Crush	Labor	Death	No
19th	Adelaide	20 June 1908	Ernest Roberts	Labor	Edward Alfred Anstey	Labor	Resignation	Yes
19th	Flinders	18 May 1907	Arthur Hugh Inkster	LDU	Edgar Hampton Warren	FPPU	Death	No
19th	Stanley	13 April 1907	William Patrick Cummins	LDU	Kossuth William Duncan	FPPU	Death	No
19th	Adelaide	26 January 1907	James Zimri Sellar	Labor	Reginald Blundell	Labor	Death	Yes
18th	Murray	23 June 1906	Walter Hughes Duncan	ANL	Hermann Homburg	ANL	Death	Yes
17th	Victoria and Albert	25 June 1904	Andrew Dods Handyside	ANL	William Senior	Labor	Death	No
16th	Wallaroo	22 June 1901	Henry Allerdale Grainger		John Verran	Labor	Resignation	
16th	Northern Territory	15 June 1901	Vaiben Louis Solomon		Samuel James Mitchell		Resignation (entered HoR)	
16th	Gumeracha	8 June 1901	Thomas Playford II		William Jamieson	ANL	Resignation (entered Senate)	
16th	Flinders	8 June 1901	Alexander Poynton		William Tennant Mortlock		Resignation (entered HoR)	
16th	Burra	8 June 1901	Frederick Holder		William Russell		Resignation (entered HoR)	
16th	Barossa	8 June 1901	John Downer	ANL	E. H. Coombe		Resignation (entered Senate)	
16th	North Adelaide	1 June 1901	Paddy Glynn		Hugh Robert Dixson		Resignation (entered HoR)	
16th	West Adelaide	1 June 1901	Lee Batchelor	Labor	Francis Bernard Keogh		Resignation (entered HoR)	
16th	Northern Territory	20 October 1900	Walter Griffiths		Charles Edward Herbert	ANL	Death	
16th	West Adelaide	17 March 1900	Charles Kingston		Bill Denny		Resignation	

== 1890–1899 ==
Parl.	By-election	Date	Incumbent	Party	Winner	Party	Cause
16th	Encounter Bay	29 July 1899	Charles Tucker		Charles Tucker		Unseated
15th	Mount Barker	14 May 1898	John Cockburn		Charles Dumas	ANL	Resignation
15th	East Adelaide	22 January 1898	John McPherson	Labor	James Hutchison	Labor	Death
15th	Albert	31 July 1897	Archibald Peake		Archibald Peake		Unseated
15th	Albert	22 May 1897	George Ash	ANL	Archibald Peake		Death
15th	North Adelaide	22 May 1897	Arthur Harrold	ANL	Paddy Glynn	ANL	Resignation
15th	Stanley	17 October 1896	Peter Paul Gillen		William Patrick Cummins		Death
15th	Gumeracha	10 July 1896	Charles Willcox	ANL	William Richard Randell		Resignation
14th	North Adelaide	8 June 1895	George Charles Hawker		Paddy Glynn	NDL	Death
14th	East Torrens	19 May 1894	Thomas Playford II		David Packham	NDL	Appointment as Agent General
13th	Noarlunga	26 March 1892	Charles Dashwood		William Blacker		Death
13th	East Adelaide	23 January 1892	John Cox Bray		John McPherson	Labor	Resignation
13th	Northern Territory	23 May 1891	Vaiben Louis Solomon		Vaiben Louis Solomon		Resignation
13th	Wallaroo	23 May 1891	David Bews		Richard Hooper	Independent Labor	Death
13th	Wooroora	25 February 1891	Hugh Craine Kelly		Robert Kelly		Death
13th	Yatala	13 August 1890	James Cowan		Richard Butler		Death

== 1880–1889 ==
Parl.	By-election	Date	Incumbent	Party	Winner	Party	Cause
12th	Stanley	25 June 1889	Edward William Hawker		Peter Paul Gillen		Resignation
12th	Victoria	1 November 1888	Daniel Livingston		John James Osman		Death
12th	Gumeracha	12 May 1888	Robert Dalrymple Ross		Lancelot Stirling		Death
11th	East Adelaide	31 May 1886	George Dutton Green		Theodor Scherk		Resignation
11th	Albert	8 February 1886	Arthur Hardy		Arthur Hardy		Resignation
11th	Sturt	17 July 1885	Thomas King		Samuel Dening Glyde		Resignation
11th	Stanley	15 May 1885	John Miller		John Darling, senior		Resignation
11th	Wallaroo	16 February 1885	Henry Allerdale Grainger		David Bews		Resignation
11th	Albert	5 January 1885	Rudolph Henning		Andrew Dods Handyside		Death
10th	Victoria	15 June 1883	George Charles Hawker		William Whinham		Resignation
10th	Flinders	1 December 1882	Ebenezer Cooke		Patrick Boyce Coglin		Resignation
10th	Sturt	13 November 1882	William Townsend		Thomas King		Resignation
10th	Onkaparinga	15 June 1882	Friedrich Krichauff		Rowland Rees		Resignation
10th	Yatala	6 September 1881	David Murray		Josiah Howell Bagster		Resignation
10th	Yatala	13 July 1881	David Murray		David Murray		Unseated
10th	East Adelaide	17 June 1881	George Fowler		Thomas Johnson		Resignation
9th	Port Adelaide	27 July 1880	William Quin		John Hart Jr.		Resignation
9th	Gumeracha	24 April 1880	Ebenezer Ward		John Rounsevell		Resignation
9th	Noarlunga	6 January 1880	John Carr		John Colton		Resignation

== 1870–1879 ==
Parl.	By-election	Date	Incumbent	Party	Winner	Party	Cause
9th	North Adelaide	16 December 1878	Neville Blyth		Caleb Peacock		Resignation
9th	Encounter Bay	10 October 1878	James Boucaut		William West-Erskine		Resignation
9th	Noarlunga	14 September 1878	John Colton		Thomas Atkinson		Resignation
9th	Light	12 June 1878	Frank Skeffington Carroll		David Moody		Resignation
8th	Victoria	17 May 1877	John Ingleby		Lavington Glyde		Resignation
8th	East Torrens	27 March 1877	Edwin Thomas Smith		David Murray		Resignation
8th	North Adelaide	14 March 1877	Arthur Blyth		Neville Blyth		Accepted office outside parliament
8th	West Torrens	27 September 1876	Benjamin Taylor		John Mitchell Sinclair		Resignation
8th	West Adelaide	21 June 1876	William Knox Simms		John Darling Sr.		Resignation
8th	Barossa	20 May 1876	John Howard Angas		M. P. F. Basedow		Resignation
8th	Mount Barker	1 May 1876	William West-Erskine				Resignation
8th	Sturt	14 April 1876	Samuel Way		Thomas King		Resignation
8th	Wooroora	7 August 1875	James Pearce		John Bosworth		Resignation
8th	Albert	12 July 1875	Mountifort Conner		William Wigley		Resignation
8th	Barossa	9 June 1875	Johann Sudholz		John Dunn Jr.		Unseated
8th	Wallaroo	4 June 1875	Matthew Madge		Robert Dalrymple Ross		Unseated
8th	Yatala	17 May 1875	Lavington Glyde		Thomas Cowan		Resignation
8th	Yatala	17 May 1875	Wentworth Cavenagh		Wentworth Cavenagh		Resignation
8th	Light	17 May 1875	Randolph Isham Stow		Jenkin Coles		Resignation
7th	The Sturt	7 September 1874	John Henry Barrow		William Mair		Death
7th	Light	18 September 1873	Mountifort Conner		Randolph Isham Stow		Resignation
7th	Encounter Bay	5 September 1873	Thomas Reynolds		Arthur Fydell Lindsay		Resignation
7th	Victoria	17 June 1873	Edwin Derrington		Thomas Boothby		Resignation
7th	Victoria	29 May 1873	John Riddoch		Park Laurie		Resignation
7th	The Burra	3 April 1873	John Hart		Rowland Rees		Death
7th	Encounter Bay	29 February 1872	William Everard		William Rogers		Unseated
7th	Encounter Bay	29 February 1872	Thomas Reynolds		Thomas Reynolds		Unseated
6th	Victoria	24 August 1871	William Paltridge		Neville Blyth		Resignation
6th	Light	12 August 1871	Edward Hamilton		James White		Resignation
6th	West Torrens	10 August 1871	Henry Strangways		James Boucaut		Resignation
5th	West Torrens	10 February 1870	George Bean		John Pickering		Declared Vacant
5th	The Sturt	10 February 1870	Richard Bullock Andrews		Frederick Spicer		Resignation

== 1857–1869 ==
Parl.	By-election	Date	Incumbent	Party	Winner	Party	Cause
5th	Mount Barker	5 November 1868	John Dunn		William Rogers		Unseated
5th	Mount Barker	3 September 1868	William Rogers		John Dunn		Unseated
5th	Mount Barker	3 September 1868	John Cheriton		John Cheriton		Unseated
4th	The Sturt	14 August 1867	Joseph Peacock		Alexander Murray		Death
4th	East Torrens	22 July 1867	Neville Blyth		Daniel Fisher		Resignation
4th	Gumeracha	15 July 1867	Alexander Borthwick Murray		Alexander Hay		Resignation
4th	Victoria	13 December 1866	Adam Lindsay Gordon		James Umpherston		Resignation
4th	East Torrens	3 December 1866	Charles Goode		Randolph Isham Stow		Resignation
4th	Flinders	20 October 1866	Alfred Watts		Augustine Stow		Resignation
4th	The Burra	15 October 1866	George Cole		Alexander McCulloch		Resignation
4th	Port Adelaide	29 June 1866	John Hart		Jacob Smith		Resignation
4th	Light	27 November 1865	John Rounsevell		John Rounsevell		Unseated
4th	Light	12 October 1865	Francis Dutton		John Rounsevell		Accepted office
3rd	East Adelaide	5 November 1864	William Bakewell		Thomas Reynolds		Resignation
3rd	Mount Barker	8 June 1864	Allan McFarlane		William Rogers		Death
3rd	Barossa	8 June 1864	Joseph Barritt		John Williams		Resignation
2nd	Light	8 May 1862	Francis Dutton		John Rowe		Resignation
2nd	The Burra and Clare	8 May 1862	William Dale		John Bentham Neales		Resignation
2nd	Port Adelaide	8 May 1862	William Owen		John Hart		Resignation
2nd	The Murray	8 May 1862	David Wark		Allan McFarlane		Death
2nd	Gumeracha	8 May 1862	Alexander Hay		Alexander Murray		Resignation
2nd	City of Adelaide	2 May 1862	Thomas Reynolds		Thomas Reynolds		Resignation
2nd	City of Adelaide	9 December 1861	Richard Hanson		James Boucaut		Resignation
2nd	The Burra and Clare	6 May 1861	William Lennon		George Kingston		Insolvent
2nd	West Torrens	30 April 1861	George Morphett		Randolph Isham Stow		Resignation
1st	City of Adelaide	13 May 1859	William Henville Burford		William Owen		Resignation
1st	Port Adelaide	11 October 1858	John Hughes		Edward Collinson		Resignation
1st	Mount Barker	16 September 1858	Friedrich Krichauff		William Rogers		Resignation
1st	City of Adelaide	16 September 1858	Robert Torrens		Judah Solomon		Resignation
1st	The Burra and Clare	9 September 1858	Morris Marks		Edward McEllister		Resignation
1st	Light	9 September 1858	William Maturin		David Shannon		Resignation
1st	East Torrens	6 April 1858	Charles Bonney		John Henry Barrow		Resignation
1st	Light	8 February 1858	Carrington Smedley		William Maturin		Resignation
1st	Encounter Bay	15 January 1858	Benjamin Babbage		Henry Strangways		Resignation
1st	Victoria	5 January 1858	Robert Leake		George Charles Hawker		Resignation
1st	Onkaparinga	23 December 1857	William Dawes		William Townsend		Resignation
1st	East Torrens	6 October 1857	George Waterhouse		Lavington Glyde		Resignation
1st	Yatala	5 June 1857	Charles Simeon Hare		Richard Andrews		Resignation
1st	Barossa	1 June 1857	Horace Dean		William Bakewell		Unseated

== See also ==
- List of South Australian Legislative Council appointments
- List of South Australian Legislative Council by-elections
