= 1857 South Australian House of Assembly election =

1857 South Australian colonial election (House of Assembly)
- 9 March 1857
- All 36 seats in the South Australian House of Assembly
- Turnout: 6,877 (56.2%)
Party	Leader	Vote %	Seats	+/–
Independents	N/A	100.0	36	+36
This lists parties that won seats. See the complete results below.
Results by electoral district
Premier before	Premier after
Boyle Travers Finniss	Boyle Travers Finniss

The 1857 South Australian House of Assembly election was held on 9 March 1857 to elect all 36 members of the South Australian House of Assembly as part of the 1857 South Australian colonial election.

== Overall results ==
House of Assembly (AV) – Turnout 56.2% (Non-CV)
Party	Votes			Seats	
Party	Votes	%	Swing (pp)	Seats	Change
Independent	16,115	100.0	New	36	▲36
Total	16,115	100.0	–	36	▲36
Formal votes	N/A (Note: Informal voting details were not published for Mount Barker, The Sturt, and Yatala. In the other eight electorates, the formal vote was 6,877 (96.9%) and the informal votes was 218 (3.1%).)	–	–		
Informal votes	N/A	–	–		
Turnout	6,877	56.2	+56.2		
Enrolled voters	12,235 (Note: Total enrolment across all electorates, including those uncontested, was 15,538.)	–	–		
Source: Electoral Commission of South Australia

== Results by district ==
=== Uncontested ===
Electoral district	Members elected
East Torrens	Charles Bonney; George Waterhouse
Flinders	Marshall MacDermott
Gumeracka	Arthur Blyth; Alexander Hay
Light	John Tuthill Bagot; Carrington Smedley
The Murray	David Wark
Victoria	Robert Leake

=== City of Adelaide ===
1857 South Australian colonial election: City of Adelaide
Candidate	Votes	%	±
Robert Richard Torrens (elected 1)	1,208	16.0	+16.0
Richard Hanson (elected 2)	1,179	15.6	+15.6
Francis Dutton (elected 3)	1,145	15.2	+15.2
Boyle Travers Finniss (elected 4)	1,103	14.6	+14.6
John Neales (elected 5)	959	12.7	+12.7
William Henville Burford (elected 6)	620	8.2	+8.2
Patrick Boyce Coglin	413	5.5	+5.5
William Parkin	325	4.3	+4.3
William Pearce	310	4.1	+4.1
Edward Homersham	272	3.6	+3.6
Total formal votes	1,703	94.9	+94.9
Informal votes	92	5.1	+5.1
Turnout	1,795	52.8	+52.8

=== Barossa ===
1857 South Australian colonial election: Barossa
Candidate	Votes	%	±
Walter Duffield (elected 1)	406	36.3	+36.3
Horace Dean (elected 2)	337	30.1	+30.1
William Bakewell	220	19.7	+19.7
C William Jacob	155	13.9	+13.9
Total formal votes	665	95.1	+95.1
Informal votes	34	3.9	+3.9
Turnout	699	68.2	+68.2

=== The Burra and Clare ===
1857 South Australian colonial election: The Burra and Clare
Candidate	Votes	%	±
George Strickland Kingston (elected 1)	481	31.0	+31.0
Morris Lyon Marks (elected 2)	374	24.1	+24.1
Edward John Peake (elected 3)	343	22.1	+22.1
George Charles Hawker	267	17.2	+17.2
W John Gubbins	88	5.7	+5.7
Total formal votes	705	96.2	+96.2
Informal votes	28	3.8	+3.8
Turnout	733	50.2	+50.2

=== Encounter Bay ===
1857 South Australian colonial election: Encounter Bay
Candidate	Votes	%	±
Benjamin Herschel Babbage (elected 1)	160	38.7	+38.7
Arthur Fydell Lindsay (elected 2)	128	31.0	+31.0
Charles Thomas Hewett	71	17.2	+17.2
J Norman	54	13.1	+13.1
Total formal votes	229	95.8	+95.8
Informal votes	10	4.2	+4.2
Turnout	239	42.8	+42.8

=== Mount Barker ===
1857 South Australian colonial election: Mount Barker
Candidate	Votes	%	±
Friedrich Krichauff (elected 1)	352	34.4	+34.4
John Dunn (elected 2)	332	32.4	+32.4
Richard Bullock Andrews	183	17.9	+17.9
A Lorimer	118	11.5	+11.5
W Patterson	39	3.8	+3.8
Total formal votes	N/A	–	–
Informal votes	N/A	–	–
Turnout	612	60.4	+60.4

=== Noarlunga ===
1857 South Australian colonial election: Noarlunga
Candidate	Votes	%	±
Thomas Young (elected 1)	232	41.7	+41.7
Henry Mildred (elected 2)	181	32.6	+32.6
Alexander Anderson	143	25.7	+25.7
Total formal votes	331	98.5	+98.5
Informal votes	5	1.5	+1.5
Turnout	336	62.8	+62.8

=== Onkaparinga ===
1857 South Australian colonial election: Onkaparinga
Candidate	Votes	%	±
William Milne (elected 1)	333	36.4	+36.4
William Bower Dawes (elected 2)	317	34.7	+34.7
William Townsend	264	28.9	+28.9
Total formal votes	547	96.6	+96.6
Informal votes	20	3.5	+3.5
Turnout	567	80.2	+80.2

=== Port Adelaide ===
1857 South Australian colonial election: Port Adelaide
Candidate	Votes	%	±
John Hart (elected 1)	281	44.5	+44.5
John Bristow Hughes (elected 2)	203	32.2	+32.2
Alfred France	147	23.3	+23.3
Total formal votes	367	97.6	+97.6
Informal votes	9	2.4	+2.4
Turnout	376	63.3	+63.3

=== The Sturt ===
1857 South Australian colonial election: The Sturt
Candidate	Votes	%	±
Thomas Reynolds (elected 1)	272	37.0	+37.0
John Hallett (elected 2)	168	22.9	+22.9
James Allen	120	16.3	+16.3
William Jones	89	12.1	+12.1
A Allen	86	11.7	+11.7
Total formal votes	N/A	–	–
Informal votes	N/A	–	–
Turnout	495	55.2	+55.2

=== West Torrens ===
1857 South Australian colonial election: West Torrens
Candidate	Votes	%	±
Luther Scammell (elected 1)	274	39.1	+39.1
James Cole (elected 2)	168	24.0	+24.0
W Matthew Smith	139	19.9	+19.9
Robert Lyon Milne	60	8.6	+8.6
James White	59	8.4	+8.4
Total formal votes	449	95.7	+95.7
Informal votes	20	4.3	+4.3
Turnout	469	50.0	+50.0

=== Yatala ===
1857 South Australian colonial election: Yatala
Candidate	Votes	%	±
John Harvey (elected 1)	233	24.9	+24.9
Charles Simeon Hare (elected 2)	211	22.5	+22.5
John Umpherstone	181	19.3	+19.3
William Maturin	180	19.2	+19.2
John Ragless	116	12.4	+12.4
Patrick McCarron	16	1.7	+1.7
Total formal votes	N/A	–	–
Informal votes	N/A	–	–
Turnout	592	50.5	+50.5

== See also ==
- 1857 South Australian Legislative Council election
