= Members of the South Australian House of Assembly, 1857–1860 =

This is a list of members of the first parliament of the South Australian House of Assembly, which sat from 22 April 1857 until 1 March 1860. The members were elected at the inaugural 1857 election.

Name	Electorate	Start Date	End Date	Terms
Richard Andrews ^{2}	Yatala	5 June 1857	1 March 1860	1857–1860, 1862–1870
Benjamin Babbage ^{6}	Encounter Bay	9 March 1857	17 December 1857	1857
John Bagot	Light	26 February 1857	1 March 1860	1857–1865
William Bakewell ^{1}	Barossa	13 June 1857	1 March 1860	1857–1860, 1862–1864
John Henry Barrow ^{8}	East Torrens	6 April 1858	1 March 1860	1858–1860, 1871–1874
Arthur Blyth	Gumeracha	26 February 1857	1 March 1860	1857–1868, 1870–1877
Charles Bonney ^{8}	East Torrens	26 February 1857	26 January 1858	1857–1858
William Henville Burford ^{14}	City of Adelaide	9 March 1857	29 April 1859	1857–1859
James Cole	West Torrens	9 March 1857	1 March 1860	1857–1860
Edward Collinson ^{13}	Port Adelaide	11 October 1858	1 March 1860	1858–1860
William Dawes ^{4}	Onkaparinga	9 March 1857	24 November 1857	1857
Horace Dean ^{1}	Barossa	9 March 1857	7 May 1857	1857, 1857
Horace Dean ^{1}	Barossa	1 June 1857	13 June 1857	1857, 1857
Walter Duffield	Barossa	9 March 1857	1 March 1860	1857–1868, 1870–1871
John Dunn	Mount Barker	9 March 1857	1 March 1860	1857–1868, 1868
Francis Dutton	City of Adelaide	9 March 1857	1 March 1860	1857–1862, 1862–1865
Boyle Travers Finniss	City of Adelaide	9 March 1857	1 March 1860	1857–1862
Lavington Glyde ^{3}	East Torrens	6 October 1857	1 March 1860	1857–1875, 1877–1884
John Hallett	The Sturt	9 March 1857	1 March 1860	1857–1862
Richard Hanson	City of Adelaide	9 March 1857	1 March 1860	1857–1861
Charles Simeon Hare ^{2}	Yatala	9 March 1857	12 May 1857	1857, 1878–1881
John Hart ^{15}	Port Adelaide	9 March 1857	23 August 1859	1857–1859, 1862–1866, 1868–1873
John Harvey	Yatala	9 March 1857	1 March 1860	1857–1860
George Charles Hawker ^{5}	Victoria	5 January 1858	1 March 1860	1858–1865, 1875–1883, 1884–1895
Alexander Hay	Gumeracha	26 February 1857	1 March 1860	1857–1861, 1867–1871
John Bristow Hughes ^{13}	Port Adelaide	9 March 1857	24 September 1858	1857–1858
George Kingston	The Burra and Clare	9 March 1857	1 March 1860	1857–1860, 1861–1880
Friedrich Krichauff ^{9}	Mount Barker	9 March 1857	12 March 1858	1857–1858, 1870–1882, 1884–1890
Robert Leake ^{5}	Victoria	23 February 1857	8 December 1857	1857
Arthur Fydell Lindsay	Encounter Bay	9 March 1857	1 March 1860	1857–1860, 1870–1871, 1873–1878
Marshall MacDermott ^{16}	Flinders	23 February 1857	1 September 1859	1857–1859
Morris Lyon Marks ^{12}	The Burra and Clare	9 March 1857	2 August 1858	1857–1858
William Maturin ^{7, 10}	Light	8 February 1858	1 July 1858	1858
Edward McEllister ^{12}	The Burra and Clare	9 September 1858	1 March 1860	1858–1862
Henry Mildred	Noarlunga	9 March 1857	1 March 1860	1857–1865
William Milne	Onkaparinga	9 March 1857	1 March 1860	1857–1868
John Bentham Neales	City of Adelaide	9 March 1857	1 March 1860	1857–1860, 1862–1870
William Owen ^{14}	City of Adelaide	13 May 1859	1 March 1860	1857–1860, 1859–1862
Edward John Peake ^{17}	The Burra and Clare	9 March 1857	1 October 1859	1857–1859
Thomas Reynolds	The Sturt	9 March 1857	1 March 1860	1857–1862, 1862, 1864–1870, 1871–1872, 1872–1873
William Rogers ^{9}	Mount Barker	16 September 1858	1 March 1860	1858–1860, 1864–1865, 1868, 1868–1870, 1872–1875
Luther Scammell	West Torrens	9 March 1857	1 March 1860	1857–1860
David Shannon ^{10}	Light	9 September 1858	1 March 1860	1858–1860
Carrington Smedley ^{7}	Light	26 February 1857	23 December 1857	1857
Judah Solomon ^{11}	City of Adelaide	16 September 1858	1 March 1860	1858–1860, 1871–1875
Henry Strangways ^{6}	Encounter Bay	15 January 1858	1 March 1860	1858–1871
Robert Torrens ^{11}	City of Adelaide	9 March 1857	1 July 1858	1857–1858
William Townsend ^{4}	Onkaparinga	23 December 1857	1 March 1860	1857–1882
David Wark	The Murray	23 February 1857	1 March 1860	1857–1862
George Waterhouse ^{3}	East Torrens	26 February 1857	8 September 1857	1857
Thomas Young	Noarlunga	9 March 1857	1 March 1860	1857–1860

Notes

Note	District	Outgoing	Incoming
^{1}	Barossa	Horace Dean was initially declared elected, but the result was overturned by the Court of Disputed Returns on 7 May 1857.	Dean won the resulting by-election on 1 June 1857
^{1}	Barossa	Dean was again unseated by the Court on 13 June 1857.	On 13 June 1857 the court declared William Bakewell duly elected.
^{1}	Barossa	(Dean was subsequently elected as member for Hastings, New South Wales in December 1869 and July 1870, but was disqualified both times.)	
^{2}	Yatala	Charles Simeon Hare resigned on 12 May 1857.	Richard Andrews won the resulting by-election on 5 June 1857.
^{3}	East Torrens	George Waterhouse resigned on 8 September 1857.	Lavington Glyde won the resulting by-election on 6 October 1857.
^{4}	Onkaparinga	William Dawes resigned on 24 November 1857.	William Townsend won the resulting by-election on 23 December 1857.
^{5}	Victoria	Robert Leake resigned on 8 December 1857.	George Charles Hawker won the resulting by-election on 5 January 1858.
^{6}	Encounter Bay	Benjamin Babbage resigned on 17 December 1857.	Henry Strangways won the resulting by-election on 15 January 1858.
^{7}	Light	Carrington Smedley resigned on 23 December 1857.	William Maturin won the resulting by-election on 8 February 1858.
^{8}	East Torrens	Charles Bonney resigned on 26 January 1858.	John Henry Barrow won the resulting by-election on 6 April 1858.
^{9}	Mount Barker	Friedrich Krichauff resigned on 12 March 1858.	William Rogers won the resulting by-election on 16 September 1858.
^{10}	Light	William Maturin resigned on 1 July 1858.	David Shannon won the resulting by-election on 9 September 1858.
^{11}	City of Adelaide	Robert Torrens resigned on 1 July 1858.	Judah Solomon won the resulting by-election on 16 September 1858.
^{12}	The Burra and Clare	Morris Marks resigned on 2 August 1858.	Edward McEllister won the resulting by-election on 9 September 1858.
^{13}	Port Adelaide	John Hughes resigned on 24 September 1858.	Edward Collinson won the resulting by-election on 11 October 1858.
^{14}	City of Adelaide	William Henville Burford resigned on 29 April 1859.	William Owen won the resulting by-election on 13 May 1859.
^{15}	Port Adelaide	Seat declared vacant 23 August 1859 – John Hart absent without leave.	No by-election was held due to the proximity of the 1860 election.
^{16}	Flinders	Marshall MacDermott accepted the office of special magistrate on 1 September 1859.	No by-election was held due to the proximity of the 1860 election.
^{17}	The Burra and Clare	Edward Peake accepted the office of state manager of railways on 1 October 1859.	No by-election was held due to the proximity of the 1860 election.
