= 1858 Encounter Bay colonial by-election =

- 15 January 1858

Electoral district of Encounter Bay in the South Australian House of Assembly
- Registered: 939
- Turnout: 59 (6.3%)
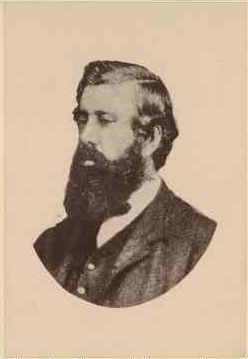

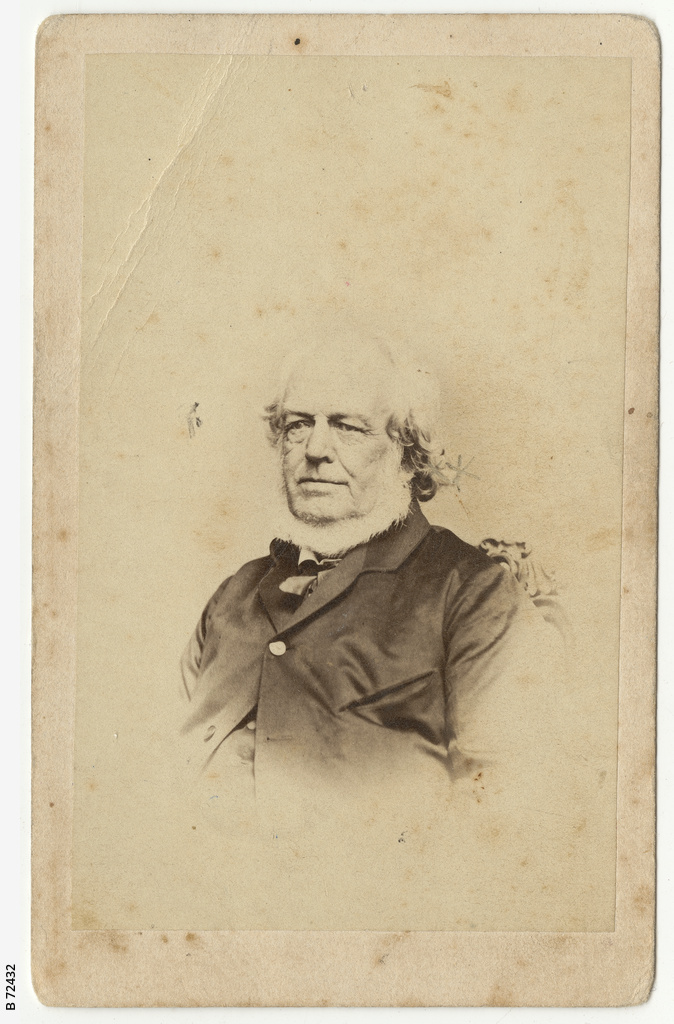
Candidate	Henry Bull Templer Strangways	Charles Thomas Hewett
FPTP vote	30	27
Percentage	52.6%	47.4%
Swing	▲52.6 pp	▲30.2 pp
MHA before election
Benjamin Herschel Babbage
Elected MHA
Henry Bull Templer Strangways

The 1858 Encounter Bay colonial by-election was held on 15 January 1858 to elect one of two members for Encounter Bay in the South Australian House of Assembly, after sitting member Benjamin Herschel Babbage resigned on 17 December 1857.

Henry Bull Templer Strangways won the by-election with 53 per cent of the vote, although the election had an incredibly low turnout, with only six per cent of registered voters casting a ballot.

== Background ==
The by-election was trigged after Benjamin Herschel Babbage resigned on 17 December 1857.

=== 1857 election result ===
1857 South Australian colonial election: Encounter Bay
Candidate	Votes	%	±
Benjamin Herschel Babbage (elected 1)	160	38.7	+38.7
Arthur Fydell Lindsay (elected 2)	128	31.0	+31.0
Charles Thomas Hewett	71	17.2	+17.2
J Norman	54	13.1	+13.1
Total formal votes	229	95.8	+95.8
Informal votes	10	4.2	+4.2
Turnout	239	42.8	+42.8

== Results ==
1858 Encounter Bay colonial by-election
Candidate	Votes	%	±
Henry Bull Templer Strangways	30	52.6	+52.6
Charles Thomas Hewett	27	47.4	+30.2
Total formal votes	57	96.6	+0.8
Informal votes	2	3.4	–0.8
Turnout	59	6.3	–36.5

== See also ==
- List of South Australian House of Assembly by-elections
