= 1857 Barossa colonial by-election =

← 1857	1 June 1857	1860 →

Electoral district of Barossa in the South Australian House of Assembly
- Registered: 699
- Turnout: 444 (63.5%)
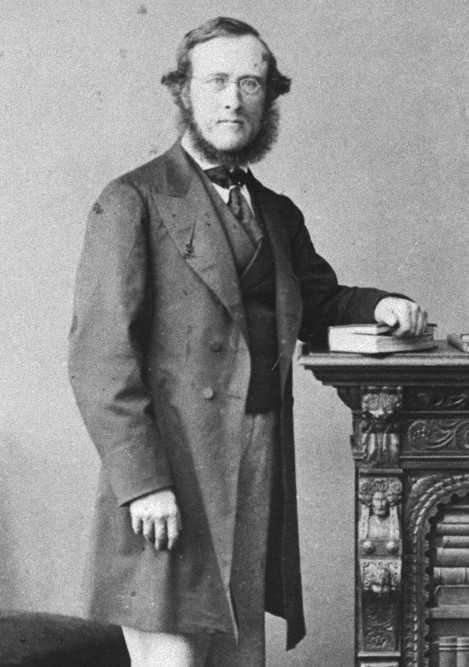
	HD		PB
Candidate	Horace Dean	William Bakewell	P Butler
FPTP vote	185	133	123
Percentage	42.0%	30.2%	27.9%
Swing	▲11.9 pp	▲10.5 pp	▲27.9 pp
MHA before election
Horace Dean
Elected MHA
Horace Dean

The 1857 Barossa colonial by-election was held on 1 June 1857 to elect one of two members for Barossa in the South Australian House of Assembly, after sitting member Horace Dean was unseated by the Court of Disputed Returns on 7 May 1857.

Horace Dean reclaimed his seat with 42 per cent of the vote, however, he was once again removed on 13 June 1857 and replaced with the runner-up, William Bakewell.

== Background ==
The by-election was trigged after Horace Dean was unseated by the Court of Disputed Returns on 7 May 1857.

=== 1857 election result ===
1857 South Australian colonial election: Barossa
Candidate	Votes	%	±
Walter Duffield (elected 1)	406	36.3	+36.3
Horace Dean (elected 2)	337	30.1	+30.1
William Bakewell	220	19.7	+19.7
C Jacob	155	13.9	+13.9
Total formal votes	665	95.1	+95.1
Informal votes	34	3.9	+3.9
Turnout	699	68.2	+68.2

== Results ==
Horace Dean won the by-election with 42 per cent of the vote, however, he was once again removed from his seat on 13 June 1857 and replaced with the runner-up, William Bakewell.

1857 Barossa colonial by-election
Candidate	Votes	%	±
Horace Dean	185	42.0	+11.9
William Bakewell	133	30.2	+10.5
P Butler	123	27.9	+27.9
Total formal votes	441	99.3	+4.2
Informal votes	3	0.7	–3.2
Turnout	444	63.5	–4.7

== See also ==
- List of South Australian House of Assembly by-elections
