= 1858 Light colonial by-election =

1858 Light colonial by-election may refer to:

- February 1858 Light colonial by-election, held after the resignation of Carrington Smedley, won by William Henry Maturin
- September 1858 Light colonial by-election, held after the resignation of William Henry Maturin, won in a walkover by David Shannon
