= 1858 The Burra and Clare colonial by-election =

← 1857	9 September 1858	1860 →

Electoral district of The Burra and Clare in the South Australian House of Assembly
Candidate	Edward McEllister
FPTP vote	Unopposed
MHA before election
Morris Lyon Marks
Elected MHA
Edward McEllister

The 1858 The Burra and Clare colonial by-election was held on 9 September 1858 to elect one of three members for The Burra and Clare in the South Australian House of Assembly, after sitting member Morris Lyon Marks resigned on 2 August 1858. The by-election was held the same day as the Light by-election.

Edward McEllister won the by-election unopposed.

== Background ==
The by-election was trigged after Morris Lyon Marks resigned on 2 August 1858.

=== 1857 election result ===
1857 South Australian colonial election: The Burra and Clare
Candidate	Votes	%	±
George Strickland Kingston (elected 1)	481	31.0	+31.0
Morris Lyon Marks (elected 2)	374	24.1	+24.1
Edward John Peake (elected 3)	343	22.1	+22.1
George Charles Hawker	267	17.2	+17.2
W Gubbins	88	5.7	+5.7
Total formal votes	705	96.2	+96.2
Informal votes	28	3.8	+3.8
Turnout	733	50.2	+50.2

== Results ==
1858 The Burra and Clare colonial by-election
Candidate	Votes	%
Edward McEllister	Unopposed	N/A
