= 1857 Onkaparinga colonial by-election =

← 1857	23 December 1857	1860 →

Electoral district of Onkaparinga in the South Australian House of Assembly
- Registered: 738
- Turnout: 523 (70.9%)
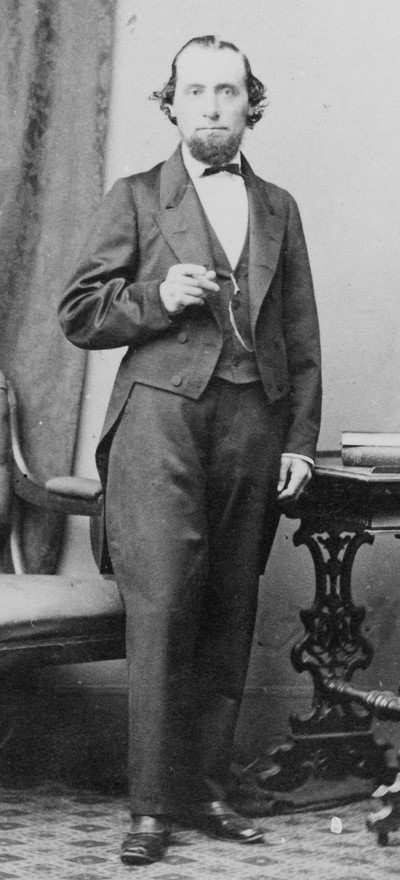
		AL
Candidate	William Townsend	A Lorimer
FPTP vote	275	241
Percentage	53.3%	46.7%
Swing	▲24.4 pp	▲46.7 pp
MHA before election
William Bower Dawes
Elected MHA
William Townsend

The 1857 Onkaparinga colonial by-election was held on 23 December 1857 to elect one of two members for Onkaparinga in the South Australian House of Assembly, after sitting member William Bower Dawes resigned on 24 November 1857.

William Townsend won the by-election with 53 per cent of the vote.

== Background ==
The by-election was trigged after William Bower Dawes resigned on 24 November 1857.

=== 1857 election result ===
1857 South Australian colonial election: Onkaparinga
Candidate	Votes	%	±
William Milne (elected 1)	333	36.4	+36.4
William Bower Dawes (elected 2)	317	34.7	+34.7
William Townsend	264	28.9	+28.9
Total formal votes	547	96.6	+96.6
Informal votes	20	3.5	+3.5
Turnout	567	80.2	+80.2

== Results ==
1857 Onkaparinga colonial by-election
Candidate	Votes	%	±
William Townsend	275	53.3	+24.4
A Lorimer	241	46.7	+46.7
Total formal votes	516	98.7	+2.1
Informal votes	7	1.3	–2.2
Turnout	523	70.9	–9.3

== See also ==
- List of South Australian House of Assembly by-elections
