= Allan McFarlane =

Australian politician (1792–1864)

Allan McFarlane (10 April 1792 – 11 March 1864) was a Scottish pastoralist and parliamentarian in The Murray and then Mount Barker districts of the Colony of South Australia.

His son Allan McFarlane sen. (1829–1908) succeeded him on the Wellington Lodge station. His grandson, Allan McFarlane jun. ran Jockwar Station, Tailem Bend, and had a son, also Allan McFarlane.

== Life ==
Allan McFarlane and his wife Margaret (née Horne) (22 November 1795 – 17 September 1878) and their family left their home in Caithness, Scotland, and arrived in South Australia aboard the Superb on 29 October 1839. Margaret's brother Donald Horne (died 1870) was a Writer to the Signet.

McFarlane was appointed Justice of the Peace some time before December 1858 and Special Magistrate in 1864.

In 1862, McFarlane was elected to the seat of The Murray in the South Australian House of Assembly, in a by-election occasioned by the death of Dr. David Wark. He defeated Henry Kent Hughes 20 votes to 18 (out of a constituency in excess of 200, voting not being then compulsory). With a redistribution later that year, most of his seat was subsumed in the seat of Mount Barker. and he was, with John Dunn, elected to that seat in the election held at the end of 1862.

McFarlane bought Wellington Lodge station. He was for many years active with the Mount Barker Agricultural and Horticultural Society. and a Mount Barker representative on the Country Committee of the R.A.& H.S

McFarlane died at his residence Ruthyn Lodge, Kensington.

== Family ==
For many years his name was spelled McFarlane or MacFarlane interchangeably in the newspapers, so it would appear that he was indifferent to its orthography, but eventually "McFarlane" was settled on by his descendants, with famous exceptions noted below. The occasional spelling "Alan" in references can be ascribed to typographical mistakes.

Among the children of Allan McFarlane and his wife Margaret (née Horne) (22 November 1795 – 17 September 1878) were:

- Elizabeth Williamson McFarlane (2 Aug 1817 – 2 January 1887) married surgeon David Begg ( – 20 January 1868) of Tirhut, India on 13 December 1843.
- Patrick McFarlane (1820 – 31 May 1855) died at Tirhut, India.
- Margaret Horne MacFarlane (11 June 1821 – 22 October 1901) married Northern Territory pioneer William Giles jnr. (1814 – 14 January 1875), son of William Giles on 11 April 1848.
- John Horne McFarlane (1823 – 13 October 1866) died in Melbourne
- Benjamina Horne MacFarlane (9 May 1826 – 18 October 1905) married Andrew Chalmers M.D. on 25 December 1851
- Allan McFarlane (1829 – 11 March 1908) married Susanna Hector on 27 June 1862. They lived at "Glensloys", Mount Barker and "Wellington Lodge". Allan made considerable improvements to Wellington Lodge station (land reclamation, massive water tanks, compressed-air shearing machines powered by burning mutton fat, wind-powered sawmill) and was known as a considerate employer, notably to his aboriginal workers. He was a successful breeder of merino sheep and one of the first to recognise the threat to pastoralists posed by the rabbit. He was a stalwart of the Meningie District Council, an enthusiastic yachtsman with the Milang Sailing Club, and an expert marksman, winning several trophies at Wimbledon. Their family included:
  - His eldest daughter, also named Susanna Hector McFarlane, married George Arthur Jervois (son of Major-General Jervois and a nephew of Sir William Jervois) on 3 December 1885.
  - His second daughter, Margaret Matilda ( – 9 January 1949), married Albert Edward Bowman (ca.1865 – 10 July 1938) on 30 October 1889. They ran Bethanga Park station in Victoria.
  - His third daughter, Elizabeth Begg McFarlane, married Michael Seymour Hawker, a son of G. C. Hawker, on 9 June 1891 and lived at Aldgate.
  - His fourth daughter, Alice, married Dr. Robert Stewart of Hindmarsh on 15 May 1889.
  - daughter Isabella married Alexander Benjamin Henderson on 5 August 1901.
  - His youngest daughter, Lucy, married Edward Leslie Gordon on 2 November 1904.
  - His eldest son Allan McFarlane jun., married Janie Thomson on 6 December 1893. They had a son on 5 March 1899,
  - Third son Donald Hector McFarlane married Doris Elizabeth Forrest on 29 April 1908
  - Youngest son Gordon Hector McFarlane married Doris Philippa Hawker, daughter of Walter Hawker on 19 April 1911.
- Sir Donald Horne MacFarlane (18 Jul 1830 – 2 June 1904), merchant, parliamentarian and poet, lived in South Australia for 13 years.
- Isabella Horne McFarlane (1832 – 6 October 1916) married Charles Hampden Pickford on 3 June 1852
- Susan Dunsanne (some references have Dunsmuir) MacFarlane (30 Mar 1839 – January 1887) married Alexander Benjamin Henderson on 24 September 1862

The McFarlanes owned the Wellington Lodge station prior to 1855 Their home until around 1860 was "Glensloy", near Mount Barker Junction (midway between Balhannah and Littlehampton). which remained family property until 1882.

Duncan McFarlane J.P. (died 27 October 1856), also of Mount Barker and of "Alverstoke" Glen Osmond was no relation.
