= 1858 Port Adelaide colonial by-election =

← 1857	11 October 1858	1860 →

Electoral district of Port Adelaide in the South Australian House of Assembly
- Registered: 1,064
- Turnout: 342 (32.1%)
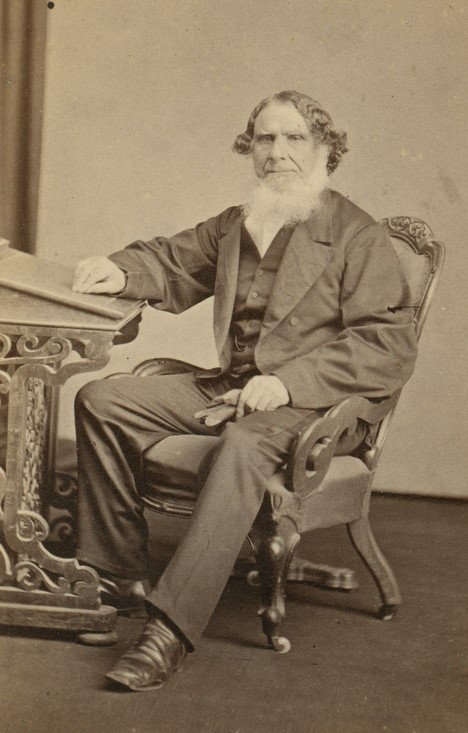
	EGC
Candidate	Edward Gascoigne Collinson	Emanuel Solomon
FPTP vote	183	143
Percentage	56.1%	43.9%
Swing	▲56.1 pp	▲43.9 pp
MHA before election
John Bristow Hughes
Elected MHA
Edward Gascoigne Collinson

The 1858 Port Adelaide colonial by-election was held on 11 October 1858 to elect one of two members for Port Adelaide in the South Australian House of Assembly, after sitting member John Bristow Hughes resigned on 24 September 1858.

Edward Gascoigne Collinson won the by-election with 56 per cent of the vote.

== Background ==
The by-election was trigged after John Bristow Hughes resigned on 24 September 1858.

=== 1857 election result ===
1857 South Australian colonial election: Port Adelaide
Candidate	Votes	%	±
John Hart (elected 1)	281	44.5	+44.5
John Bristow Hughes (elected 2)	203	32.2	+32.2
A France	147	23.3	+23.3
Total formal votes	367	97.6	+97.6
Informal votes	9	2.4	+2.4
Turnout	376	63.3	+63.3

== Results ==
1858 Port Adelaide colonial by-election
Candidate	Votes	%	±
Edward Gascoigne Collinson	183	56.1	+56.1
Emanuel Solomon	143	43.9	+43.9
Total formal votes	326	92.2	–5.4
Informal votes	16	4.7	+2.3
Turnout	342	32.1	–31.2

== See also ==
- List of South Australian House of Assembly by-elections
