= 1857 Yatala colonial by-election =

← 1857	5 June 1857	1860 →

Electoral district of Yatala in the South Australian House of Assembly
- Registered: 264
- Turnout: 239 (90.5%)
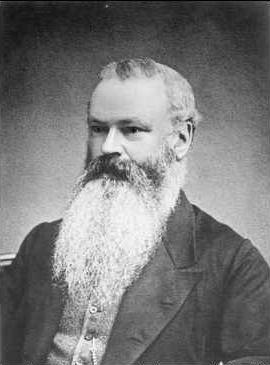
		TH	RLM
Candidate	Richard Bullock Andrews	T Hogarth	RL Milne
FPTP vote	121	103	13
Percentage	51.1%	43.5%	5.4%
Swing	▲51.1 pp	▲43.5 pp	▲5.4 pp
MHA before election
Charles Simeon Hare
Elected MHA
Richard Bullock Andrews

The 1857 Yatala colonial by-election was held on 5 June 1857 to elect one of two members for Yatala in the South Australian House of Assembly, after sitting member Charles Simeon Hare resigned on 12 May 1857.

Richard Bullock Andrews won the by-election with 51 per cent of the vote.

== Background ==
The by-election was trigged after Charles Simeon Hare resigned on 12 May 1857.

=== 1857 election result ===
1857 South Australian colonial election: Yatala
Candidate	Votes	%	±
John Harvey (elected 1)	233	24.9	+24.9
Charles Simeon Hare (elected 2)	211	22.5	+22.5
J Umpherstone	181	19.3	+19.3
William Henry Maturin	180	19.2	+19.2
J Ragless	116	12.4	+12.4
P McCarron	16	1.7	+1.7
Turnout	592	50.5	+50.5

== Results ==
1857 Yatala colonial by-election
Candidate	Votes	%	±
Richard Bullock Andrews	121	51.1	+51.1
T Hogarth	103	43.5	+43.5
RL Milne	13	5.4	+5.4
Total formal votes	237	99.2	N/A
Informal votes	2	0.8	N/A
Turnout	239	90.5	+40.0

== See also ==
- List of South Australian House of Assembly by-elections
