= 1858 Mount Barker colonial by-election =

← 1857	16 September 1858	1860 →

Electoral district of Mount Barker in the South Australian House of Assembly
- Registered: 1,153
- Turnout: 565 (36.4%)
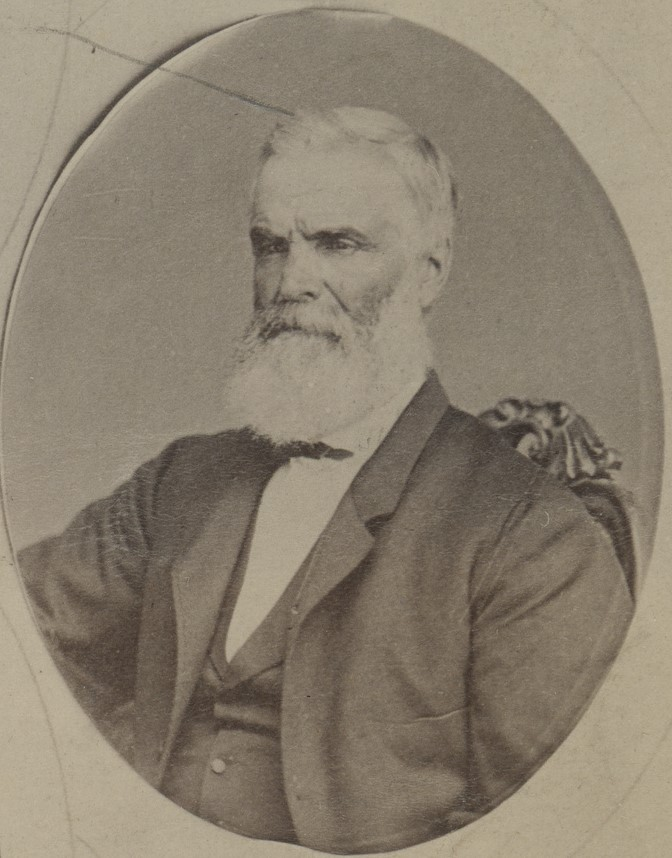
		HR
Candidate	William Rogers	H Russell
FPTP vote	272	249
Percentage	52.2%	47.8%
Swing	▲52.2 pp	▲52.2 pp
MHA before election
Friedrich Eduard Heinrich Wulf Krichauff
Elected MHA
William Rogers

The 1858 Mount Barker colonial by-election was held on 16 September 1858 to elect one of two members for Mount Barker in the South Australian House of Assembly, after sitting member Friedrich Eduard Heinrich Wulf Krichauff resigned on 12 March 1858. The by-election was held the same day as the City of Adelaide by-election.

William Rogers won the by-election with 52 per cent of the vote.

== Background ==
The by-election was trigged after Friedrich Eduard Heinrich Wulf Krichauff resigned on 12 March 1858.

=== 1857 election result ===
1857 South Australian colonial election: Mount Barker
Candidate	Votes	%	±
Friedrich Eduard Heinrich Wulf Krichauff (elected 1)	352	34.4	+34.4
John Dunn, sen. (elected 2)	332	32.4	+32.4
Richard Bullock Andrews	183	17.9	+17.9
A Lorimer	118	11.5	+11.5
W Patterson	39	3.8	+3.8
Turnout	612	60.4	+60.4

== Results ==
1858 Mount Barker colonial by-election
Candidate	Votes	%	±
William Rogers	272	52.2	+52.2
H Russell	249	47.8	+47.8
Total formal votes	565	36.4	N/A
Informal votes	44	7.8	N/A
Turnout	565	36.4	–24.0

== See also ==
- List of South Australian House of Assembly by-elections
