= 1857 East Torrens colonial by-election =

- 6 October 1857

Electoral district of East Torrens in the South Australian House of Assembly
- Registered: 178
- Turnout: 141 (79.2%)
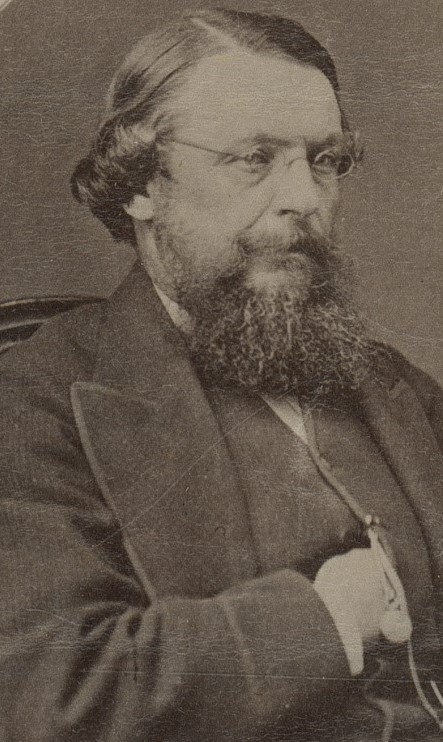
		JB
Candidate	Lavington Glyde	J Baker
FPTP vote	71	67
Percentage	51.4%	48.6%
Swing	▲51.4 pp	▲48.6 pp
MHA before election
George Marsden Waterhouse
Elected MHA
Lavington Glyde

The 1857 East Torrens colonial by-election was held on 6 October 1857 to elect one of two members for East Torrens in the South Australian House of Assembly, after sitting member George Marsden Waterhouse resigned on 8 September 1857.

Lavington Glyde won the by-election with 51 per cent of the vote.

== Background ==
The by-election was trigged after George Marsden Waterhouse resigned on 8 September 1857.

=== 1857 election result ===
1857 South Australian colonial election: East Torrens
Candidate	Votes	%
Charles Bonney (elected 1)	Unopposed	N/A
George Waterhouse (elected 2)	Unopposed	N/A

== Results ==
1857 East Torrens colonial by-election
Candidate	Votes	%	±
Lavington Glyde	71	51.4	+51.4
J Baker	67	48.6	+48.6
Total formal votes	138	97.9	+97.9
Informal votes	3	2.1	+2.1
Turnout	141	79.2	+79.2

== See also ==
- List of South Australian House of Assembly by-elections
