= 1858 Victoria colonial by-election =

- 5 January 1858

Electoral district of Victoria in the South Australian House of Assembly
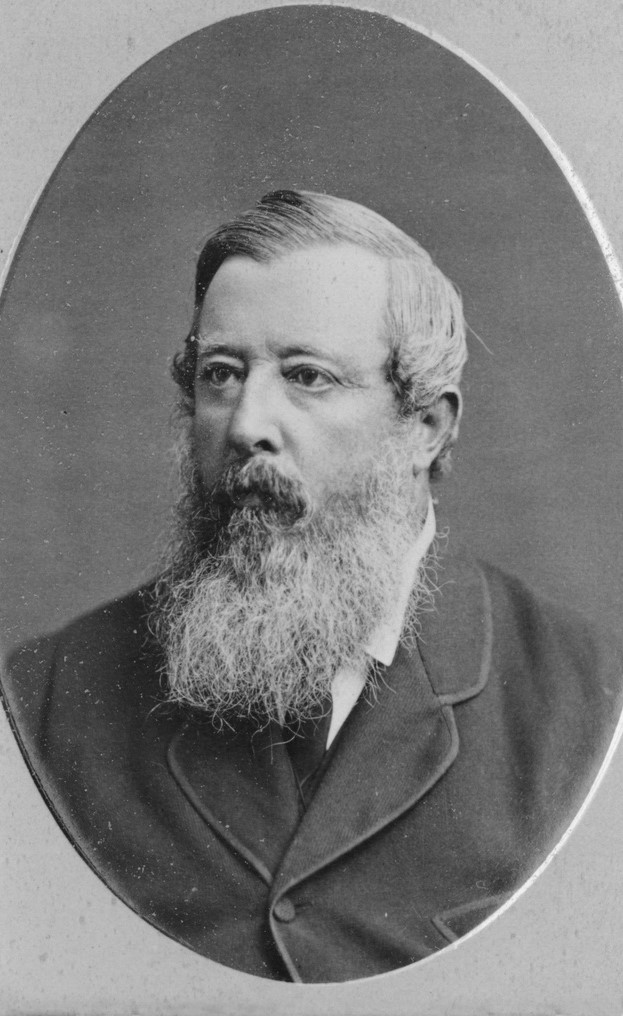
Candidate	George Charles Hawker
FPTP vote	Unopposed
MHA before election
Robert Rowland Leake
Elected MHA
George Charles Hawker

The 1857 Victoria colonial by-election was held on 5 January 1858 to elect the member for Victoria in the South Australian House of Assembly, after sitting member Robert Rowland Leake resigned on 8 December 1857.

George Charles Hawker won the by-election unopposed.

== See also ==
- List of South Australian House of Assembly by-elections
