= 1858 City of Adelaide colonial by-election =

- 16 September 1858

Electoral district of City of Adelaide in the South Australian House of Assembly
- Registered: 2,911
- Turnout: 1,231 (42.3%)
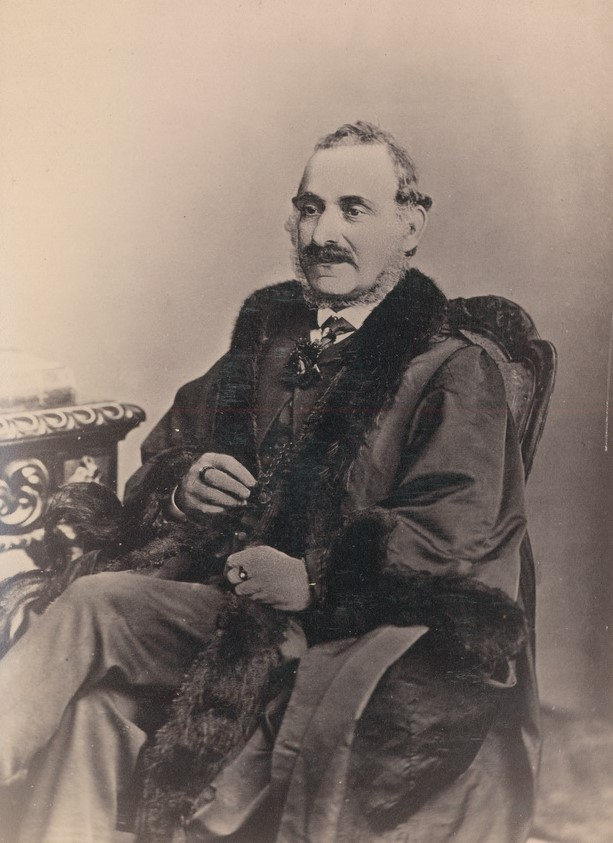
		MS
Candidate	Judah Moss Solomon	M Smith
FPTP vote	819	310
Percentage	72.5%	27.5%
Swing	▲72.5 pp	▲27.5 pp
MHA before election
Robert Richard Torrens
Elected MHA
Judah Moss Solomon

The 1858 City of Adelaide colonial by-election was held on 16 September 1858 to elect one of six members for City of Adelaide in the South Australian House of Assembly, after sitting member Robert Richard Torrens resigned on 1 July 1858. The by-election was held the same day as the Mount Barker by-election.

Judah Moss Solomon won the by-election with 73 per cent of the vote.

== Background ==
The by-election was trigged after Robert Richard Torrens resigned on 1 July 1858.

=== 1857 election result ===
1857 South Australian colonial election: City of Adelaide
Candidate	Votes	%	±
Robert Richard Torrens (elected 1)	1,208	16.0	+16.0
Richard Hanson (elected 2)	1,179	15.6	+15.6
Francis Dutton (elected 3)	1,145	15.2	+15.2
Boyle Travers Finniss (elected 4)	1,103	14.6	+14.6
John Neales (elected 5)	959	12.7	+12.7
William Henville Burford (elected 6)	620	8.2	+8.2
Patrick Boyce Coglin	413	5.5	+5.5
William Parkin	325	4.3	+4.3
William Pearce	310	4.1	+4.1
Edward Homersham	272	3.6	+3.6
Total formal votes	1,703	94.9	+94.9
Informal votes	92	5.1	+5.1
Turnout	1,795	52.8	+52.8

== Results ==
1858 City of Adelaide colonial by-election
Candidate	Votes	%	±
Judah Moss Solomon	819	72.5	+72.5
M Smith	310	27.5	+27.5
Total formal votes	516	98.7	+2.1
Informal votes	7	1.3	–2.2
Turnout	523	70.9	–9.3

== See also ==
- List of South Australian House of Assembly by-elections
