= 1858 East Torrens colonial by-election =

- 4 April 1858

Electoral district of East Torrens in the South Australian House of Assembly
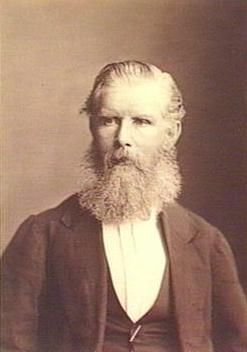
Candidate	John Henry Barrow
FPTP vote	Unopposed
MHA before election
Charles Bonney
Elected MHA
John Henry Barrow

The 1858 East Torrens colonial by-election was held on 4 April 1858 to elect one of two members for East Torrens in the South Australian House of Assembly, after sitting member Charles Bonney resigned on 26 January 1858.

John Henry Barrow won the by-election unopposed.

== See also ==
- List of South Australian House of Assembly by-elections
