= Donald Horne (political agent) =

Donald Horne (1787–1870) was a Scottish lawyer, known as a political agent for the 5th Duke of Buccleugh.

== Life ==
He was born at Stanstill into a prominent Caithness family, the second son of John Horne (died 1823) of Stirkoke. He was a nephew of James Horne of Langwell (1752–1831), a political agent there in the Conservative interest, and his brother William Horne of Stirkoke, both of whom were attorneys.

Horne went to school in Musselburgh and was a student at Edinburgh University. He was an apprentice in law to his uncle James and became a Writer to the Signet in 1813.

For his role as electoral agent, John Prest called Horne "the F. R. Bonham of North Britain". He worked for the fifth Duke of Buccleugh, the leading Conservative figure in Scotland, and prepared reports covering Scottish parliamentary constituencies. He gave evidence on four days of March 1837 to the parliamentary select committee on fictitious votes in Scotland. The Reform Act 1832 had given the Whigs an electoral edge in Scotland. Subsequently, Horne for the Tory side made incremental progress, exploiting weaknesses in the Act. His working relationship with the Duke ended in 1842.

Horne was on the Board of the Union Bank of Scotland by 1850.

== Property ==
On his uncle James's death in 1831, Horne inherited the Langwell Estate in south-east Caithness. It is now known as the Braemore and Langwell Estate, for grouse shooting and salmon fishing. He sold it, in 1857, to John Bentinck, 5th Duke of Portland for £90,000. The estate was involved in the Highland Clearances. One at Auchencraig is said to have been ordered by Horne in 1830, at which date his uncle was owner.

Horne's sister Isabella married Kenneth Mcleay of Newmore. As trustees to the Charles Hill estate in British Guiana, after Mcleay's death, they share compensation money under the Slavery Abolition Act 1833.

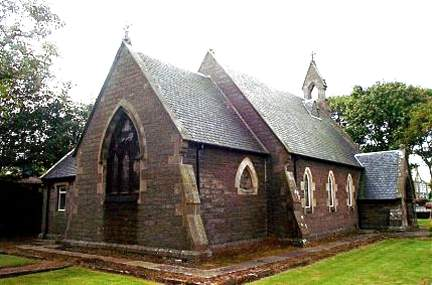
The Church of St John The Evangelist, Wick, built on land given by Donald Horne

In 1867 Horne gave land for the construction of a Scottish Episcopal Church building in Wick, Caithness.

== Family ==
Horne married in 1821 Jane Ogilvie, daughter of Thomas Elliot Ogilvie of Chesters.

- Their son James Horne (1822–1872) was father of Henry Horne, 1st Baron Horne.
- Their daughter Hannah married Joseph Buckley.
