= February 1858 Light colonial by-election =

- 8 February 1858

Electoral district of Light in the South Australian House of Assembly
- Registered: 1,504
- Turnout: 283 (18.8%)
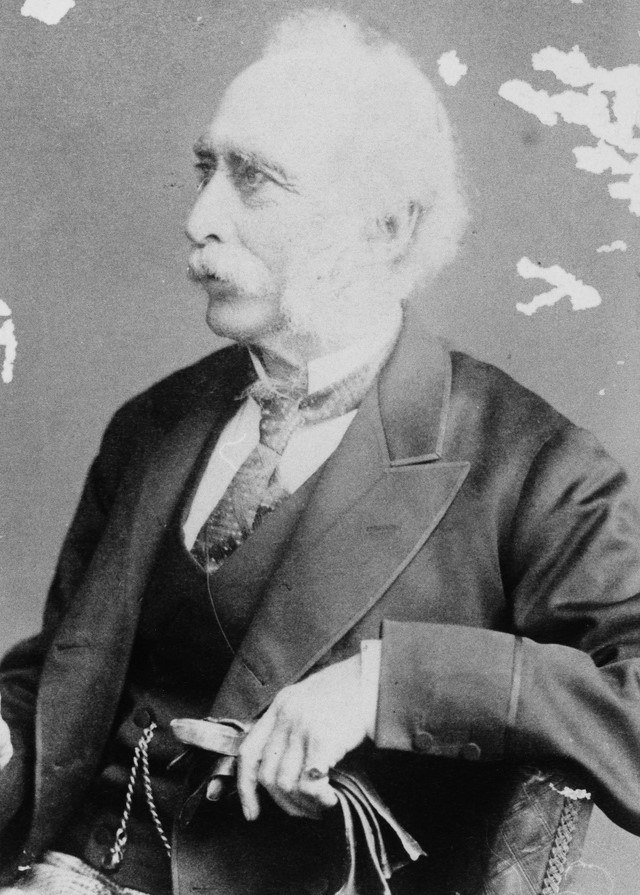
		WWT
Candidate	William Henry Maturin	WW Tuxford
FPTP vote	158	113
Percentage	58.3%	41.7%
Swing	▲58.3 pp	▲41.7 pp
MHA before election
Carrington Smedley
Elected MHA
William Henry Maturin

The February 1858 Light colonial by-election was held on 8 February 1858 to elect one of two members for Light in the South Australian House of Assembly, after sitting member Carrington Smedley resigned on 23 December 1857.

William Henry Maturin won the by-election with 58 per cent of the vote.

== Results ==
February 1858 Light colonial by-election
Candidate	Votes	%	±
William Henry Maturin	158	58.3	+58.3
WW Tuxford	113	41.7	+41.7
Total formal votes	271	95.8	+95.8
Informal votes	12	4.2	+4.2
Turnout	283	18.8	+18.8

== See also ==
- List of South Australian House of Assembly by-elections
