= Charles Thomas Hewett =

Australian politician

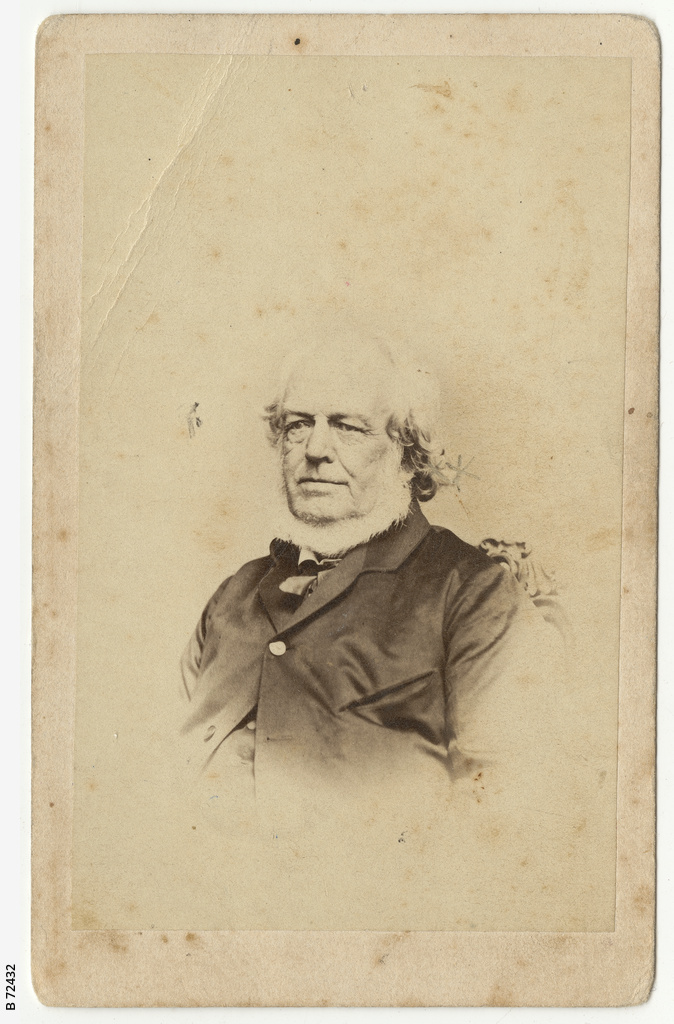
- Born: South Pool, Devon, England
- Baptised: 14 June 1795
- Died: 5 April 1871 (aged 76–77); Mount Barker, South Australia
- Resting place: Congregational Chapel Cemetery McLaren Vale
- Spouse(s): Hannah Jane Moore (1801–1846) and Catherine Westlake nee Stumbles (1814–1880)
- Children: Faith Emily Moore Hewett (1824–1908), Hannah Huldah Hewett (1825–1892), Onesimus Septimus Hewett (1827–1904), Ebenezer Eldad Hewett (1829–1876), Charles Shallum Hewett (1832–1909), Elijah Medad Hewett (1834–1916), Ethelbert Heber Hewett (1837–1908), Rhoda Augusta Northumberland Hewett (1839–1926), unnamed Hewett (1842–1842), Reumah Ann Bertha Josepha Hewett (1846–1904), Thomas Henry Hewett (1848–1906), Mary Kate Hewett (1849– ), Samuel Leland Hewett (1852–1908), Frederick Francis Hewett (1854–1938), Mercy Hewitt (1856–1891)
- Parent(s): John Hewett and Mary Ann nee Torr
- In office 17 November 1862 - 8 March 1865
- Constituency: South Australian House of Assembly Electoral district of Noarlunga

Charles Thomas Hewett (about 1794 – 5 April 1871) was an English-born South Australian pioneer of the Noarlunga area of South Australia, particularly in the areas south of the Onkaparinga River, and politician.

He left England on the ship Duchess of Northumberland on 5 August 1839, arriving at Holdfast Bay, South Australia on 17 December 1839 with his wife, Hannah, and seven children.

== Family ==
He was the son of John Hewett and Mary Ann née Torr, and married twice to Hannah Jane Moore on 5 April 1824 in St. Saviour, Dartmouth, Devon, England and Catherine Westlake (née Stumbles) in 1846 in South Australia. There were seven children born in England and eight born in Australia.
