= September 1858 Light colonial by-election =

- 9 September 1858

Electoral district of Light in the South Australian House of Assembly
Candidate	David Shannon
FPTP vote	Unopposed
MHA before election
William Henry Maturin
Elected MHA
David Shannon

The September 1858 Light colonial by-election was held on 9 September 1858 to elect one of two members for Light in the South Australian House of Assembly, after sitting member William Henry Maturin resigned on 1 July 1858. The by-election was held the same day as The Burra and Clare by-election.

David Shannon won the by-election unopposed.
