= Benjamin Herschel Babbage =

Australian engineer, explorer and politician (1815–1878)

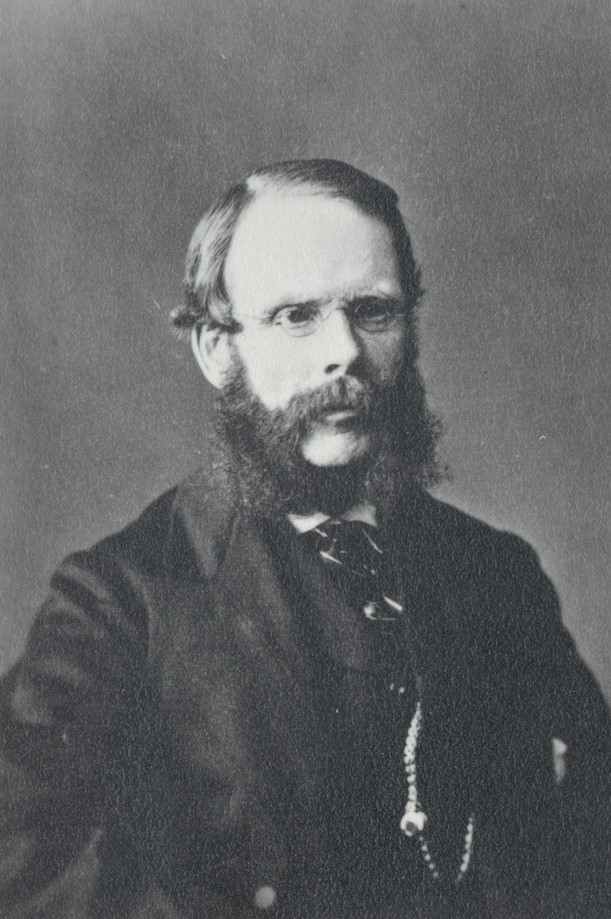
- Babbage in 1878

Member of the South Australian Parliament for Encounter Bay
- In office 9 March 1857 – 17 December 1857 Serving with Arthur Lindsay
- Preceded by: New district
- Succeeded by: Henry Strangways

Personal details
- Born: 6 August 1815 London, United Kingdom
- Died: 22 October 1878 (aged 63) St. Mary's, South Australia
- Spouse: Laura Jones (m. 1839–1878)
- Children: 7
- Parent: Charles Babbage (father)
- Relatives: William Wolryche-Whitmore (uncle)

Benjamin Herschel Babbage (6 August 1815 – 22 October 1878) was an English engineer, scientist, explorer and politician, best known for his work in the colony of South Australia. He invariably signed his name "B. Herschel Babbage" and was frequently referred to as "Herschel Babbage". He was the son of English mathematician and inventor Charles Babbage.

== Early life and family ==
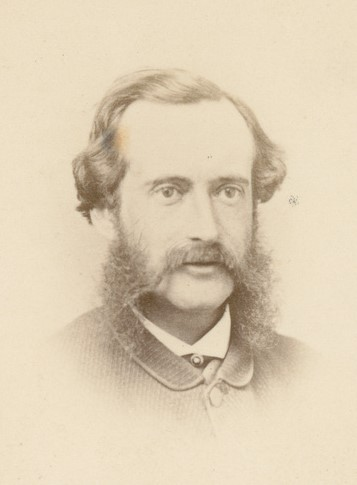
Portrait of Babbage circa 1860.

Babbage was born in London, the eldest son of Charles Babbage, the renowned Cambridge mathematician who originated the concept of a programmable computer, and Georgina Whitmore. His uncle on his mother's side was William Wolryche-Whitmore, an MP in the House of Commons who lobbied for the formation of South Australia and introduced the South Australia Foundation Act into the British Parliament.

At the age of 18, Babbage became a pupil of the engineer and architect William Chadwell Mylne, with whom he worked on waterworks projects. In the 1840s, he also worked with Isambard Kingdom Brunel, the son of his father's friend Marc Isambard Brunel, on railway planning and building in Italy and England.

Babbage married Laura Jones at Bristol on 10 September 1839. The couple had seven children.

In 1850, Babbage was invited by Patrick Brontë (clergyman and father of the Brontë sisters) to conduct an inspection in the West Yorkshire town of Haworth, partly brought about by Haworth's high rate of early mortality. Babbage was horrified by the unsanitary conditions in the town, and The Babbage Report to the General Board of Health into the town's water supply and lack of a sewerage system resulted in the board taking notice and working to improve the town's sanitation. He performed a similar inspection in the same year in the Herefordshire town of Bromyard, with similar findings. He said that he had "met with considerable opposition to the application of the Public Health Act to this town, from a large number of the inhabitants, upon the ground of the supposed expense of carrying out the sanitary reforms which I found to be so much needed." No action was taken by the town vestry for over twenty years.

== South Australia ==
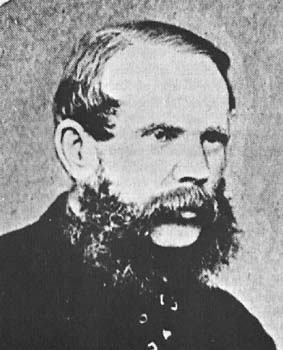
Benjamin Babbage

In 1851, the Colonial Secretary Earl Grey, on the recommendation of the geologist Sir Henry De la Beche, assigned Babbage to perform a geological and mineralogical survey of the colony of South Australia requested by the colony's government. Babbage arrived in South Australia on 27 November on the Hydaspes, and over the next few years worked on a number of government projects, first setting up the Government Gold Assay Office in Victoria Square.

He was appointed Justice of the Peace in 1852. In January 1853 he was appointed Chief Engineer by the company undertaking the railway from Port Adelaide to the city. In 1853, Babbage was one of the first five members of the Mitcham District Council, serving as the council's first chairman. A ward in the City of Mitcham was named after him. In 1854 he was elected to the Central Road Board. In 1855, Babbage served as President of the Adelaide Philosophical Society.

In 1857, Babbage was elected to the South Australian House of Assembly in the inaugural election in 1857, representing the electorate of Encounter Bay. He resigned late in the year after being appointed to lead an expedition to explore the north of the colony between Lake Torrens and Lake Gairdner. He was replaced by Henry Strangways in a by-election.

Babbage began his exploration of South Australia in 1856 when sent to search for gold up to the Flinders Ranges, when he discovered the MacDonnell River, Blanchewater and Mount Hopeful (renamed Mount Babbage after him in 1857 by George Goyder). Going beyond the frontier reached in 1851 by explorers John Oakden and Henry Hulkes, Babbage also disproved the notion that Lake Torrens was a single horseshoe-shaped lake or inland sea, ascertaining a number of gaps in the lake, which were later traversed by other explorers such as Augustus Gregory and Peter Warburton. On 15 June 1858 near Pernatty Creek he discovered the remains of William Coulthard of Angas Park, Nuriootpa, who had died of thirst around 10 March 1858. On 22 October 1858 he discovered Emerald Springs.

Babbage also discovered that Lake Eyre (sighted by Edward John Eyre in 1840) actually consisted of a large northern and a smaller southern lake. A peninsula on Lake Eyre North was named Babbage Peninsula in 1963.

As Babbage continued his explorations, sometimes accompanied by his son, Charles Whitmore Babbage, the government grew tired of his slow, methodical pace, and the Commissioner of Crown Lands, Francis Dutton, responded to the controversy by replacing him with Peter Warburton in 1858. Babbage complained of unfair treatment and petitioned the House of Assembly to conduct a parliamentary inquiry into the issue. A critically acclaimed book of his pen-and-ink sketches from this expedition is held by the Mortlock Library.

He announced his candidature for the 1877 Legislative Council elections but refused to participate in any public meetings and did not go to the polls. and failed to win a seat.

His last years were spent building a mansion near South Road, St Mary's, where he had an excellent vineyard and was a keen winemaker (nine varieties on 25 acres in 1878). He called the mansion The Rosary, but locals referred to it as Babbage's Castle. It was built in 1873 near the burned-out cottage of John Wickham Daw, on Daws Road, and was massively constructed of concrete in a fantastic baroque style. The building developed structural defects however and remained deserted from around 1905 to around 1935, when it was demolished.

He died at his home, and his remains were interred in the family vault in the cemetery of St Mary's on the Sturt.

== Family ==
Babbage married Laura Jones (c. 1813 – 22 July 1899) at Bristol on 10 September 1839. Among their children were:

Charles Whitmore Babbage (1842 – 17 August 1923), their eldest son, was a prize-winning student at Adelaide Educational Institution 1853–58. Herschel wrote to his father:

"I have found a good school for the boys, John Lorenzo's non-denominational school. The largest private independent school in South Australia at this time."

Charles accompanied his father on his journeys of exploration 1857–62, recording scenes in a small sketchbook which has been preserved. He was a member of the Adelaide Philosophical Society and for some years its Honorary Secretary. He married Amelia Barton on 28 July 1869. While working as a teller with the Bank of Adelaide he started speculating on the Stock Exchange and losing money. On 1 July 1876 he was charged with embezzling £1616, and in September was sentenced to seven years imprisonment for that and passing a fraudulent cheque. During his internment his wife ran their home as a boarding house for students of Prince Alfred College and ran drawing classes. His family moved to New Zealand in 1881. He was released from prison some time after 1880 and moved to New Zealand, for a while farming in Wanganui, then "Croftmoor", near Hāwera, from 1883. Around 1894 he moved to St John's Hill, Wanganui, where he took an active role in local affairs, and was a prominent member of the Camera Club and the Wanganui Astronomical Society. He was active in the Beautifying Society and did much work on Virginia Lake. His wife was on the board of the Wanganui Orphanage from 1896 to 1918 and president from 1910. Their home "Rotokawau" was on St John's Hill above the Winter Garden; the gully at the rear is called "Babbage's Gully". He died at home after a brief illness.

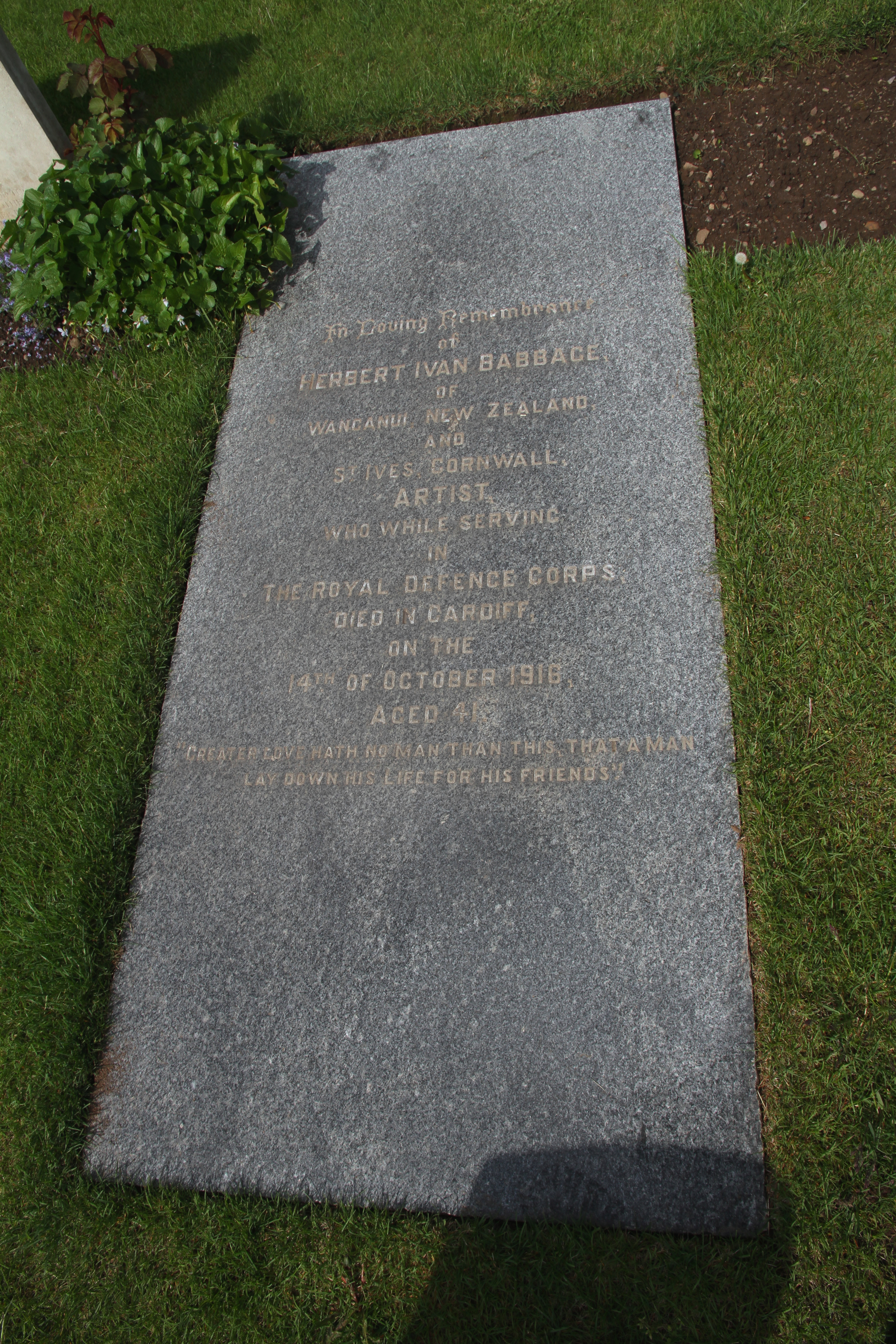
Grave of Herbert Ivan Babbage in Cathays Cemetery, Cardiff, Wales

The National Library of New Zealand has a collection of his photographs. Babbage Place in Wanganui was named for him.

- Charles Ernest Babbage (17 June 1870 – 24 December 1878)
- Alfred Whitmore Babbage (26 Oct 1871 – 27 June 1957) married Kate Elizabeth Hobbs on 7 July 1900
- Henry Herschel Babbage (6 October 1873 – c. 1947)
- Herbert Ivan Babbage (10 August 1875 – 14 October 1916) was a noted N.Z. artist who studied under David Edward Hutton (1866–1946) then at Académie Julian, Paris. He died in England while serving with the Royal Defence Corps in World War I. The National Library of New Zealand has a collection of his photographs. Wanganui's Sarjeant Gallery has six of his paintings.
- Gordon Swaine Babbage (c. 1885 – c. 1 July 1975) in Wanganui, married Florence Mabel Josephine Rutherford (c. 1893 – c. 1 September 1940) on 14 April 1914

- Dr. Stuart Barton Babbage (4 January 1916 – 16 Nov 2012), born in Auckland, married Elizabeth King in 1943, became Anglican Dean of Sydney in 1947, then of Melbourne (and Principal of Ridley College) in 1953.

Eden Herschel Babbage (c. 1844 – 5 February 1924) was also a prize-winning student at AEI 1853–1859. He married Louisa Harriot Burton (d. 22 September 1917) on 30 April 1872. An employee of the Bank of Australasia from 1860, he was transferred to Sale, Victoria in 1877 then promoted to manager of the branch at Wanganui, New Zealand, followed by successively more responsible posts until his retirement in 1906 at his home "Rawhiti" on Clanville Road, Roseville, New South Wales, where he was active as councillor and president of the Progress Association. A memorial was erected to him, the "Father of Roseville" on the corner of Babbage Road (which was named for him) and Ormonde Road,

- Francis Eden Babbage (8 May 1873 – 1 April 1949) married Eleanor Mary Molesworth on 11 February 1903. He followed his father in the Australasian Bank.

- Max Babbage (13 January 1908 – )
- Neville Babbage (5 February 1912 – ) collected much Babbage ephemera now held by Sydney's Powerhouse Museum.

- Zara Georgina (20 February 1875 – ) born in Adelaide
- Laura Louise Irene Babbage (19 January 1881 – ) born at Wanganui N.Z.

Henry Stainton Babbage (29 September 1853 – 11 June 1889), his youngest son, was also a prize-winning student at AEI. He married Emma Rosetta Leverington. His twin, Ada Isabella Babbage died in 1855.

- (Rupert Clement) Henry Stainton Babbage (1889 – 21 January 1943) married Dorothy Alexanderina Brown in March 1912. They divorced in August 1938. He married again, to Myrtle, née Ramsdon.

Ada Rosalie Babbage (12 November 1855 – 1936) married William D. Clare on 16 Nov 1881

== Dugald Bromhead Babbage ==
Herschel's brother Dugald Bromhead (13 March 1823 – September 1901) arrived in Adelaide on the Grecian on 24 September 1849 and worked a farm on Goodwood Road. He worked as assistant to his brother in the Assay Office in 1852, helped found the Adelaide Philosophical Society in 1853 and in 1854 surveyed the route of the proposed Port Adelaide to Adelaide railway. Herschel, while protective of his less able younger brother, despaired of his propensity to mix with social inferiors and his fondness for drink. He married Anne Lea at Sturt on 7 March 1854. Their children included:

- Dugald Herschel Babbage (15 December 1854 – ) returned to UK on the Orient in 1882
- Walter Henry Babbage (1 August 1856 – 18 December 1883)
- Louisa Ann Babbage (18 January 1859 – ?)

== Sources ==
Tee, Garry. "Charles Babbage's Contributions to Statistics" (PDF).

South Australian House of Assembly
New district	Member for Encounter Bay; 1857; Served alongside: Arthur Lindsay	Succeeded by Henry Strangways
