= David Wark (Australian politician) =

Australian politician

David Wark (c. 1807 – 3 March 1862) was a medical practitioner and politician in the colony of South Australia. He was at the centre of a controversy after being called to examine a child suspected of having been murdered.

== History ==
David Wark was a medical doctor born on Scotland, perhaps Ayrshire, and was a member of the Faculty of Physicians and Surgeons of Glasgow, licensed to teach anatomy and perform autopsies.

His first marriage produced a son Robert Hunter Wark, and ended with the death of his wife.

The widower Wark then emigrated to South Australia from Glasgow for a more congenial climate, arriving with his son aboard Welcome on 3 April 1839, having served as ship's surgeon. He went back to Britain, most likely with his son, and on 15 July 1841 left for Sydney, perhaps alone, aboard the ship Herald, and arrived in South Australia aboard Duke of Sussex in September 1841.

He had settled in the Encounter Bay area and admired the local Aborigines, but was, as a medical practitioner, concerned with the fate of the females, who were succumbing to venereal diseases through interaction with European men.

He was active in the Scottish community of Adelaide, a member of the St. Andrew's Society.

In 1852 he was called on to give medical evidence at a Coroner's Inquest into the death of a child, whom her step-father, a Mr. Horgan, was accused of murdering. He was later lambasted by the Crown Prosecutor for not having conducted a post-mortem at the time. An altercation ensued, and Mann took his complaints to Judge Crawford, whose criticisms of Wark were published in the newspapers. Wark published a reasoned defence, nevertheless regretted he had not made a more thorough examination.

In 1853 John Hart, M.L.C, about to embark on a visit to England, entrusted Wark with his resignation from the Chamber, to be tendered if needed in the interests of his electorate. Wark was accused, anonymously by a letter to the press, of colluding with Hart to give him (Wark) easy succession into Parliament. Wark denied such an imputation.

He was in 1853 appointed a charter councillor for the East Torrens council district, and chairman in 1854.

In July 1854 he was touted as a candidate for the forthcoming election to the Legislative Council, but in the event, he did not stand.

Wark was elected unopposed to the South Australian House of Assembly for the seat of Murray and sat from February 1857, was re-elected unopposed in 1860 and died on 3 March 1862.

The family lived at Alton House, perhaps earlier named Auldton, Magill, since demolished, and for which Alton Street, Magill was named.

== Family ==
Wark's first marriage was to Mary Hunter, some time around 1830; they had four sons, of whom only Robert Hunter Wark (1833 – 23 April 1880) survived. After the death of his wife, Wark left for Australia.

He married again, to Catherine Keeling, on 28 April 1842 at the residence of Matthew Moorhouse in North Adelaide. The ceremony was performed by Rev. T. Q. Stow. Catherine was the daughter of James and Sarah Keeling of Hanley, Staffordshire, and emigrated with her widowed mother in June 1839 aboard Sir Charles Forbes. Sarah died on 1 February 1854 at Alton House.

- Margaret Orr Wark (4 August 1843 – 29 August 1917) married George Rolfe (1808 – 18 December 1871) in San Francisco on 5 November 1870. She married again, to Robert Gemmell Gibson (c. 1840, died 22 August 1897 in Wellington, NZ) on 1 August 1872. and had three daughters, Muriel Margaret (born in Castlemaine, Victoria, 15 October 1873), Beatrice Marie (born in Castlemaine, Victoria, 4 June 1875) and Berta Jean Gibson (born in Sandhurst (Bendigo) 21 October 1883).
- James Keeling Wark (16 September 1845 – 3 May 1886), on 2 November 1876, married Mary Newland (28 May 1854 – 17 March 1942), a niece of Simpson Newland. He died on 3 June 1886 at Rylands Station after being thrown from his carriage.
- Francis Wark (26 November 1847 – 16 January 1911)
- David Wark (3 October 1849 – 11 March 1850)
- Jane Wark (5 May 1851 – 24 July 1859)
- Alexander Wark (8 July 1854 – 23 July 1859)
- Catherine Wark (19 April 1856 – 17 August 1920)

On 22 July 1859 Catherine gave birth to a boy, still-born. She died she same day. The following day, his second daughter Jane (born 1851) died. The next day, his son Alexander (born 1854) died, all, according to A. T. Saunders, from diphtheria.

Wark died three years later.
