= Electoral district of The Murray (South Australia) =

Former state electoral district of South Australia

The Murray South Australia—House of Assembly
- State: South Australia
- Created: 1857
- Abolished: 1862
- Namesake: Murray River
- Demographic: Rural
- Coordinates: 35°5′S 139°5′E

The Murray was an electoral district of the South Australian House of Assembly, the lower house of the bicameral legislature of the then colony of South Australia.

The Murray was one of the original districts created in 1857 and abolished in 1862; part of its area was then included in Mount Barker.

== Members ==
Member	Party	Term
David Wark		1857–1862
Allan McFarlane		1862–1862
