= James Cole (politician) =

Australian architect and politician

James William Cole (ca.1808 – 23 June 1861) was an architect and politician in the colony of South Australia.

== Personal life ==
Cole was born in 1808 in Westminster, London, England. His father was William Cole (c.1796-1843), and Cole had three sisters. Cole sailed to the colony Van Diemen's Land (now Tasmania, Australia) on the barque Vibilia to settle in Hobart. Fellow traveller Mary Best (ca.1798 – 16 February 1882) came from a family of cabinet makers and upholsterers; they married in December 1833. They lived for a time in Hobart before moving to Launceston, where they had three children:

- Judith Bickerton Cole (24 February 1835 – 16 September 1916). On 23 April 1885 she married William Caddy Cox (ca.1812 – 16 October 1898), who had previously been married to Harriet Willis ( – 27 May 1880)
- William George Cole (25 August 1837 – 25 December 1919). In 1919 he died Parkside, South Australia
- Alfred Bickerton Cole (1840–1849)

After seven years in Van Diemen's Land they moved to Portland, Victoria. Five years later they travelled overland, in a covered wagon drawn by oxen, to Adelaide, South Australia, arriving in 1846. In 1848 Cole paid £30 to buy 10 acres of land in Enfield where he built a cottage for his family. His youngest son, Alfred, died in 1849, aged 9.

Cole had a protracted illness and died intestate, aged 53, on 23 June 1861. His wife, Mary, died at "Lashbrook" near Macclesfield in 1916.

== Career ==
Cole undertook house carpentry and joinery work in Hobart, before moving with his wife to Launceston. After seven years in Van Diemen's Land they moved to Portland, Victoria, where Cole was employed as Superintendent of Public Works from 1841 to 1846.

On 15 December 1846 Cole opened his own office as 'Architect & Surveyor' in Adelaide, where he worked for 15 years from 1846 to 1861. He designed a Wesleyan Methodist Mission House. He let and sold property for a commission. After building his own cottage in 1848 he gained work designing houses and shops for other people.

After joining the Independent Order of Rechabites and the Total Abstinence Society, he gained opportunities such as trusteeships and surveyorships of building societies and housing developments.

In 1852 he spent most of a year prospecting at Amcrovan Gully, Bendigo.

He became a paid court witness in building disputes, and accepted publicly subscribed fees for overseeing the design and construction of small chapels. In the 1850s his work ranged from two-storey terraced houses to warehouses and shops, with a speciality in small churches and schoolrooms. His architectural work included Temperance Hall, 182-184 Tynte Street, North Adelaide, built in 1858.

In 1858 he became City Surveyor of the Adelaide Council. In June 1859 he was a founding member of the South Australian Association of Architects, Engineers, and Surveyors.

He was elected to parliament as member for West Torrens (9 March 1857 – 12 March 1860).

By the 1860s his buildings included "villa residences" for minor gentry.

== Bibliography ==
- Cole, William Dawson; Cole, James William, 1808-1861 (1986), The Journeys of James William Cole, 1808-1861, W.D. Cole
