= Thomas Young (Australian politician) =

Australian politician

Thomas Young (16 October 1813 – 10 December 1904) was a politician in the early days of the colony of South Australia. His eldest son, also named Thomas Young, was for many years mayor of Port Augusta.

== History ==
Thomas Young sen. was born at King's Somborne, Hampshire near Southampton and educated at Winchester, then was apprenticed to an uncle at Andover. He emigrated to South Australia in the ship Singapore, arriving on 11 November 1839. He and partner Henry Douglas (3 October 1817 – 5 July 1903) took up land at Happy Valley, site of the present reservoir, where they grew wheat, which proved profitable. Later he opened a general store at O'Halloran Hill, and is also recorded as having a store at Clarendon. He was Chairman of the first District Council of Clarendon, holding that office for three years. He was elected to the House of Assembly, representing the seat of Noarlunga from 9 March 1857 to 22 March 1860. From 1867 he served as Clerk of the Courts at Blinman, for nine years then with the Main Roads Board for the Northern District in Port Augusta from 1877 to 1884, when the board was abolished. He spent some time in Adelaide, then returned to Port Augusta where he joined his son's firm of Young & Gordon, and also acted as auditor for various Port Augusta institutions.

== Family ==
Thomas Young was twice married. By his first wife he had four children, two surviving; by his second marriage to Emily Mary Baker (c. 1834 – 30 May 1914) he had three daughters and one son:

- Florence Elizabeth Young (c. 1842 – 20 July 1951) married Arthur Betteridge, lived in Richmond, Victoria
- Thomas Young jun. (19 November 1844 – 17 May 1913) was born in Happy Valley and educated at the schools of J. M. Holder (father of Sir Frederick Holder) and J. L. Young. He worked for his father, then for D. & J. Fowler Ltd. before moving in 1864 to Port Augusta, where he founded the shipping agency Bignell & Young then Young & Gordon with Robert Gordon. He served as mayor of Port Augusta 1879–1881 and 1898–1900. He was involved in copper mining at Mount Gunson. He married Isabella Loudon (c. 1850 – 7 October 1931) in 1868; their children included:

- Herbert Loudon Young (1869 – 31 July 1931) succeeded his father as director of Young & Gordon. His son Colin Young was a prisoner-of-war in Germany during World War I.
- Jane Craig Young (1874–1894)
- Frank Drysdale Young (1876– ) married Florence Maud Laidlaw in 1911
- Eva Benie Florence Young (1878– )
- Helen Gertrude Young (1882–1958)
- Oliver James Young (1884–1956) married Margaret Cowan on 29 September 1920
- Jessie Isabel Young (1887–1934) married Lloyd Sunman in 1911. Sons included Jack Young Sunman (born 19 February 1913), Robert Owen Sunman (born 6 November 1914), Colin London Sunman (born 16 March 1919), Leonard Robert Sunman (born 20 February 1924)
- Bertha Augusta Young (1891– ) married Laurence Lindsay "Laurie" Jones on 4 February 1914

- third son George Young (c. 1847 – 11 June 1918) married Isabella Stephens Stanton on 3 July 1877. He was butcher at Blinman then with Young & Gordon in Port Augusta.
- Emmeline Clara Young (1869– )
- Sidney Wooldridge Caldwell Young ( –1953) married Charity Nixon Conway ( – 24 June 1928) in 1905; they lived at Port Augusta. He married again, to widow Alice Mary Brougham, née Pascoe ( – 4 December 1952) c. 20 March 1930, lived at Quorn, where he was a prominent musician, then Dulwich.

- Dudley Caldwell Young (22 February 1908 – ) was engaged to Dorothy Nancy Kemp in 1931
- Gwynith Wyke Young (1906–1996) married Clement Charles Hooper on 4 December 1928

- Lillian Gertrude Young (1871–) married George Frederick Egan (1867–1935), on 6 July 1897, lived in Perth, Western Australia. George was for a time mayor of Carnarvon
