= Robert Leake (Australian politician) =

Australian politician

Robert Rowland Leake (1811 – 14 September 1860) was a sheep farmer politician in the early days of the colony of South Australia.

== History ==
Robert Rowland Leake and his brother Edward John Leake (1812–1867) emigrated with their parents John and Elizabeth Leake to Tasmania (then Van Diemen's Land) in 1823 with the first flock of Saxon Merino sheep to be brought to the Southern Hemisphere. He was appointed by the South Australia Company to oversee in 1836 the flock they were importing into their new colony.

Robert and his brothers settled in the South-East of South Australia as squatters and eventually Robert became owner of the Glencoe estate.

They founded Inverary station on the shores of Lake Leake, an extinct volcano. Adam Lindsay Gordon was once employed there as a horse-breaker.

Robert served as the first member of the House of Assembly for the single-person electorate of Victoria from February 1857. He resigned in December 1857.

On the death of Robert, his brother Edward inherited Glencoe Station of 53,000 acres (21,000 ha), carrying 53,000 sheep, 3,500 cattle and 300 horses. He was responsible for building a magnificent new woolshed designed by W. T. Gore and accommodating 36 shearers on the board, it is now National Trust. Letitia Leake sold the station to John Riddoch and George Riddoch, who later divided the property between themselves. John took the southern end and in 1898 broke it up for closer settlement; George's named his portion "Koorine".

== Family ==
Robert Leake married Ruth Hickmer in 1853. She married again, to Henry William Thirkill on 3 January 1867.

Edward John Leake (died 27 April 1867) married Letitia Amanda Clarke on 31 July 1854. She had a son 3 October 1862; she married again, to Richard McCarthy on 19 November 1870.

== Bibliography ==
- Yelland, E. M (1973), The Baron of the Frontiers : South Australia-Victoria, Robert Rowland Leake (1811-1860), Hawthorn Press, ISBN 978-0-7256-0105-8
