= Edward Collinson =

Australian politician

Member of the South Australian House of Assembly for Port Adelaide
- In office 11 October 1858 – 12 March 1860

Personal details
- Died: April 1861

Edward Gascoigne (Note: His middle name has been variously spelled as "Gascoyne" and "Gascoyen".) Collinson (1801 – April 1861) was a businessman and politician in the early days of the colonies of Western Australia and South Australia.

== History ==
He arrived in Swan River Colony (now Western Australia) in 1829 and was for some time a government employee.

He moved to South Australia around 1847 and set up in business as a shipping agent, taking over the lease of Queen's Wharf, Port Adelaide to which he added the bonded warehouse in 1848. In 1851 Collinson and Younghusband built a wharf at the top end of the Port River opposite Fletcher's Slip, officially named "Princes Wharf" but was generally known as "Collinson's Wharf" until around 1861.

He was member of the South Australian House of Assembly for the seat of Port Adelaide from 11 October 1858 to 12 March 1860. He was appointed Justice of the Peace in 1860. He was a trustee for the Port Adelaide Harbour Trust.

On 23 November 1833 he was married by the Rev. J. B. Wittenoom to Mary Lucile Birkett, daughter of Josephine Marie Louise Madeleine Birkett, née L'Afferiare, and James Birkett of H.M. 86th Regiment. They had no children. He accumulated substantial real estate property which was disposed of in 1899.
