= Electoral district of The Burra and Clare =

Former South Australian electoral district

Coordinates: 33°40′00″S 138°56′00″E

The Burra and Clare South Australia—House of Assembly
- State: South Australia
- Created: 1857
- Abolished: 1862
- Namesake: Burra, South Australia, Clare, South Australia
- Demographic: Rural

The Burra and Clare was an electoral district of the House of Assembly in the Australian state of South Australia from 1857 to 1862.

The Burra and Clare was also the name of an electoral district of the unicameral South Australian Legislative Council from 1851 until its abolition in 1857, George Strickland Kingston being the member.

In November 1862 The Burra and Clare was an abolished and superseded by the Electoral district of The Burra, John Bentham Neales and George William Cole being the last members for the old district and the first members for the new.

The town of Burra is currently located in the seat of Stuart while the town of Clare is currently located in the seat of Ngadjuri.

== Members ==
Member	Party	Term	Member	Party	Term	Member	Party	Term
Edward Peake		1857–1860	Morris Marks		1857–1858	George Kingston		1857–1860
Edward Peake		1857–1860	Edward McEllister		1858–1860	George Kingston		1857–1860
William Dale		1860–1862	George Cole		1860–1862	William Lennon		1860–1861
William Dale		1860–1862	George Cole		1860–1862	George Kingston		1861–1862
John Neales		1862–1862	George Cole		1860–1862	George Kingston		1861–1862
