= William Bakewell (politician) =

Australian politician (c.1817–1870)

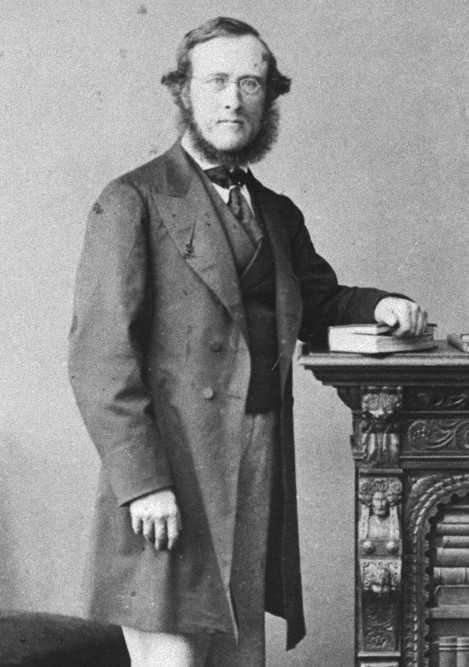

Member of the South Australian Parliament for Barossa
- In office 13 June 1857 – 22 March 1860 Serving with Walter Duffield
- Preceded by: Horace Dean
- Succeeded by: Edward Grundy

Member of the South Australian Parliament for East Adelaide
- In office 10 November 1862 – 27 October 1864 Serving with Philip Santo
- Preceded by: New district
- Succeeded by: Thomas Reynolds

Personal details
- Born: 1817 Shirleywich, Staffordshire, United Kingdom
- Died: 25 January 1870 (aged 53) Adelaide, South Australia
- Spouse: Jane Warren
- Occupation: Lawyer

William Bakewell (ca.1817 – 25 January 1870) was a solicitor and politician in the early days of the Colony of South Australia.

== History ==
William was born at Whichton Lodge, near Shirleywich, in the parish of Weston-on-Trent, Staffordshire. As a boy he was employed by solicitors Christian & Co. of Liverpool, and emigrated in the Fairfield, to Adelaide arriving in April 1839. He carried letters of recommendation from solicitor William Bartley, through which he obtained employment as a clerk in the office of Mann & Gwynne, to whom he was later articled. He was admitted to the Bar in 1848 and taken into partnership with his former employer as Bartley & Bakewell, whose business as solicitors became one of the largest and best-conducted in the city. They were joined for a time by R. I. Stow, then W. D. Scott, son of the Hon. W. Scott, later to become Master of the Supreme Court. Bakewell's first foray into public activity was in opposition to State aid to religion, acting as Secretary of the Australasian National League.

On 13 June 1857 Bakewell was appointed as representative of Barossa in the first House of Assembly (1857–1860), replacing Dr. Horace Dean who was unseated on the grounds that he was an American citizen and had assumed a false name. He was elected to the seat of East Adelaide in 1862 in company with Philip Santo, defeating Boucaut and Homersham. During his second period of Parliamentary duty he succeeded in passing an Act regulating the proceedings of Joint-Stock Companies, which became known as "Bakewell's Act". He twice visited England since his arrival in the colony, once in 1853, when he was away for between two and three years, and a second time in 1865, resigning his seat in the House of Assembly on 27 October 1864 for the purpose, his visit being in connection with the famous Moonta lawsuit, in which he was senior counsel for the Company. It was he who made the first speech before the Supreme Court on the motion for the original writ of scire facias which led to an appeal to the Privy Council.

On his return to the colony the partnership of Bakewell & Scott was dissolved, and a partnership with Mr. Daly carried on the business as Hicks & Daly, and also Hanson and Hicks, which still later was carried on by Bakewell, Daly, and Price, until the "disruption" (when the original members of these firms gave up their private practice to occupy the senior posts in two most important legal institutions: the Supreme Court and the Real Property Office), leaving to Bakewell the sole conduct of their businesses. When in 1867 Judge Wearing replaced Benjamin Boothby as third judge of the Supreme Court, Bakewell was appointed to the vacant post of Crown Solicitor. He was forced by ill health to resign the position and died some three weeks later.

== Personal ==
Bakewell was a member of the Congregational Church and a friend of the Rev. T. Q. Stow, but his burial was conducted by the Dean of Adelaide in a Church of England service.

== Family ==
On 20 April 1844 he married Jane Warren, sister of the Hon. John Warren of "Springfield", Mount Crawford. Their home was "Shirley", near Payneham.

- John Warren Bakewell (1 Mar 1847 – 3 Apr 1923) studied law at Cambridge, and after being called to the bar, returned to South Australia, where he had a successful career in law and business. He married Helen Kate Grant on 11 January 1877. Their home was "Koralla" (later St Michael's House), Mount Lofty, South Australia and destroyed in the Ash Wednesday fire 16 February 1983. He was, with John Beal Sheridan (c. 1833 – 20 March 1906) (son of Frances Keith Sheridan), author of the durable The magistrate's guide (1879).
- Helen Bakewell (12 Mar 1845 – 9 September 1900) married Robert Alers Hankey, son of an eminent London banker, on 16 March 1865.
- Louisa Jane Bakewell (16 May 1849 – 11 January 1931) married dental surgeon J. R. Gurner ( – 11 June 1900) on 12 October 1871
- Emily Bakewell (4 Sep 1851 – 13 June 1887) married vigneron and pastoralist Walter Reynell (27 March 1846 – 8 April 1919), son of John Reynell. on 16 May 1877
- Leonard William Bakewell (11 Sep 1854 – 1 Aug 1925), respected solicitor, horseman and yachtsman, married Isabella Monteith (c. 1857 – 1 March 1930) on 21 July 1881. He was partner with Sir Josiah Symon and Arthur William Piper in Symon, Bakewell & Piper (or for much of the time Symon, Bakewell, Stow & Piper) from 1892 to 1898. They lived at "Shirley", then "Yerto", Fitzroy Terrace, Prospect.

- Eva May Bakewell (1882– )
- William Kenneth Bakewell (1884–1952) married Annie Ramsay Henderson ( –1969). He was partner with Piper and his sons in Piper, Bakewell & Piper, though he retired in 1920.

- Helen Rosemary Bakewell (1915– )
- Leonard Neville Bakewell (1916– )
- Evelyn Gwendoline Bakewell (1918– )

Samuel Bakewell (c. 1815 – 22 September 1888), MHA for City of Adelaide 1860–1862, was a brother. His family included E. H. Bakewell, the businessman and chairman of the Municipal Tramways Trust, for whom the Bakewell Bridge was named.

Adelaide's Bakewell Bridge (on Glover Avenue/Henley Beach Road over the railway and Port Road East/Railway Terrace, Mile End) was built to carry trams and vehicular traffic. It was opened on 22 December 1925 and demolished in 2007. The replacement underpass was opened in January 2008.

South Australian House of Assembly
Preceded by Horace Dean	Member for Barossa; 1857–1860; Served alongside: Walter Duffield	Succeeded by Edward Grundy
New district	Member for East Adelaide; 1862–1864; Served alongside: Philip Santo	Succeeded by Philip Santo
