= Morris Lyon Marks =

Australian politician

Morris Lyon Marks (7 September 1824 – 4 March 1893) was a Jewish businessman remembered as a politician in the colony of South Australia. He was frequently referred to by his full name or as "Morris L. Marks" to distinguish him from several contemporaries named Morris Marks.

== History ==
A son of Lyon Marks ( – ) and Mrs. Marks (c. 1783 – 5 February 1857), he and his brother Solomon Lyon Marks migrated from London to South Australia on the Abberton, arriving in December 1846, and was a successful importer and merchant in Adelaide and Burra. He and his brother were, as M & S Marks, owners of the "Liverpool Mart" in Hindley Street, Adelaide's largest emporium.

He was, in 1848, a member of the consortium (with Burnet Nathan, Louis Hart, Joseph Hart, and Samuel Hart) which purchased from George Morphett land on Rundle Street for the first Synagogue (consecrated 3 September 1850). He married in 1850 and later had a large family.

He was a passenger on the steamer Osmanli, which hit a reef and sank in D'Estrees Bay, Kangaroo Island on 25 November 1853. No-one was seriously injured but Marks lost a quantity of gold.

He was elected to the South Australian House of Assembly, representing The Burra and Clare from March 1857 to August 1858, when he resigned in order to make a trip to Europe. On his return he continued his business, but did not stand for re-election. He spent some time alternating between New Zealand and Melbourne.

In 1883 Marks and his family left for New Zealand, and were resident in Wellington. They returned to Australia, living in Albert Park, Victoria, where he died on Saturday, 4 March 1893.

== Family ==
Marks married Leah Solomon (ca.1832 – 9 August 1908), sister of Judah Moss Solomon, on 30 January 1850. Their children were

- Henry Morris "Harry" Marks (9 October 1856 – 14 February 1909) married Amelia Francis Cohen on 19 December 1883, died at Heidelberg, Victoria
- second son Sidney Algernon Marks (ca.5 May 1858 – ) married Blanche Rosetta Woolf on 19 October 1898
- Frederick M. "Fred" Marks (16 September 1859 – )
- Albert M. Marks ( – ) married Elizabeth Cohen on 22 September 1886, lived Wellington, New Zealand
- Marcus "Mark" Marks ( – ) of Wellington, New Zealand
- Louis Marks ( – ) of Brisbane
- Lionel Marks ( – )
- Mrs. A. Phillips ( – ) of Albert Park
- Mrs. B. Lyons ( – ) of South Yarra
- Fanny or Fannie Marks ( – ) of Wellington, New Zealand

His brother and business partner Solomon Lyon Marks (1827–1875) married Esther in 1846, the first marriage in the Adelaide Synagogue. They moved to Queensland.
