= William Bower Dawes =

Australian politician

William Bower Dawes (c. 1807 – 3 August 1869) was a farmer in the colony of South Australia, and member of the first fully elected House of Assembly.

Dawes was a farmer in the Nairne district, then partner with Samuel Stocks jnr. in the district's first flour mill. He was active in the Mount Barker Agricultural Society, and their president in at least one year.

He was one of the councillors when the District Council of Nairne was proclaimed in 1853. He served as the first Member of the House of Assembly for the seat of Onkaparinga in association with (later Sir) William Milne from March 1857. He resigned in November 1857 after a series of financial reverses. He took a position as manager of a mine at Kanmantoo, which he filled conscientiously, then tried mining at Karkarilla, near Moonta on Yorke Peninsula. He was later an active trader on the Stock Exchange, though without any spectacular success.
