= Henry Strangways =

Australian politician (1832–1920)

The Honourable Henry Strangways
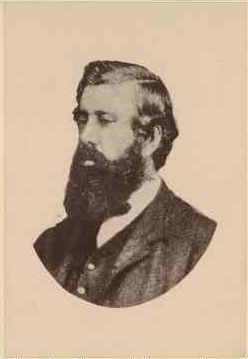

12th Premier of South Australia
- In office 3 November 1868 – 30 May 1870
- Monarch: Victoria
- Governor: Sir James Fergusson
- Preceded by: Henry Ayers
- Succeeded by: John Hart

Personal details
- Born: Henry Bull Templer Strangways; 14 November 1832 Shapwick, England, United Kingdom
- Died: 10 February 1920 (aged 87) Somerset, England, United Kingdom

Henry Bull Templer Strangways (Note: His middle name is misspelt as "Templar" by the Australian Dictionary of Biography. Templer was his mother's maiden name and is spelt correctly on his grave.) (14 November 1832 – 10 February 1920) was an Australian politician and Premier of South Australia.

Strangways was the eldest son of Henry Bull Strangways Jr. of Shapwick, Somerset, England, and his first wife, Sophia Jane Templer. His family were landed gentry in Somerset but descended from Strangways, Lancashire (now Strangeways, Manchester).

As a boy, he visited South Australia, where his uncle Thomas Bewes Strangways was a pioneer. In January 1861 he married Maria Cordelia Wigley, a sister of William Rodolph Wigley (c. 1826–1890).

== Notes ==
Political offices
Preceded by Henry Ayers	Premier of South Australia; 3 November 1868 – 30 May 1870	Succeeded by John Hart
Preceded by Richard Hanson	Attorney-General of South Australia; 9 May 1860 – 20 May 1861	Succeeded by Randolph Stow
