= Edward McEllister =

Australian politician

Edward McEllister (c. 1809 – 12 May 1866) was a politician in the early days of the Colony of South Australia.

== History ==
McEllister emigrated from Ireland, perhaps County Tipperary arriving in December 1839 aboard Delhi and served as a mounted policeman stationed for a time at Port Lincoln, then some time before 1845 took up business in Rundle Street, Adelaide, which proved lucrative, and he retired in 1850.

McEllister was a member of the Legislative Assembly for the district of Yatala from March 1860 to November 1862. He failed to be re-elected due to his support for compulsory Bible studies in State schools. He served in the Legislative Council from 1865 until his death the following year. He was survived by a widow, two sons and a daughter.

== Family ==
McEllister married Mary Sheridan (c. 1811 – 23 July 1893); they had three surviving children:

- Susan Mary McEllister (1840 – 20 May 1887) married Hampton Carroll Gleeson (1834–1907) on 15 November 1860. They had five sons and two daughters.
- Robert McEllister (c. 1842 – 13 January 1891)
- Thomas Edward McEllister (c. 1845 – 19 November 1886) married Norah Teresa O'Leary of Wirrabara on 8 January 1879. They had no children. A commission agent and share dealer, he was convicted of forgery in February 1868 and sentenced to two years' hard labor.
