= William Maturin =

Australian politician

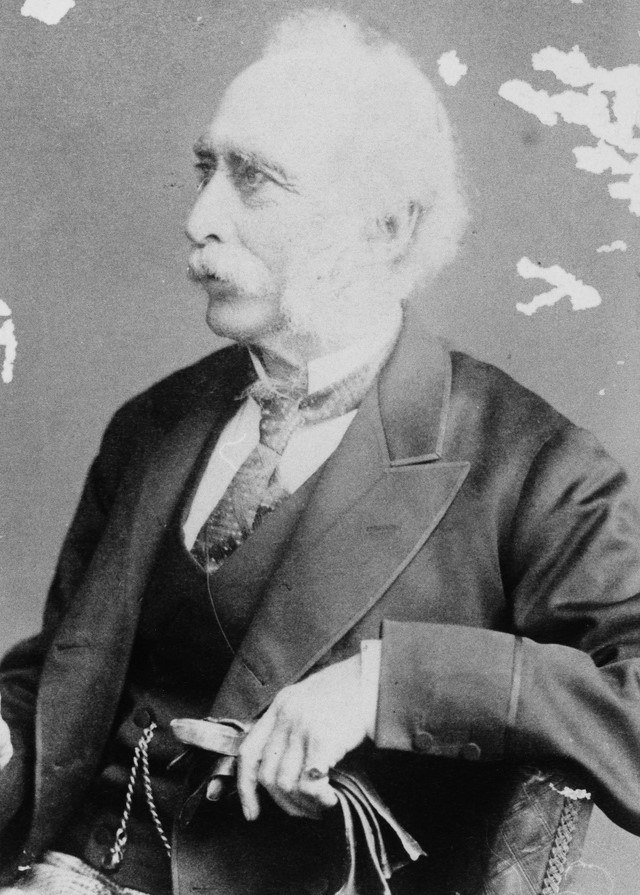

William Henry Maturin, CB (1814 – 5 March 1889) was a senior public servant in the early days of the colony of South Australia and had a further career in Great Britain.

He and his brother Augustus arrived in Adelaide on the brig Elizabeth Buckham on 22 June 1843, and took the place of W. C. Darling in the Commissariat Department under administrator Sir Henry E. Fox Young, acting as his private secretary and holding the position of Deputy Assistant Commissary General and Auditor General, was promoted to Assistant Director in 1847, then Private Secretary to the Lieutenant Governor in May 1849, and at the same time appointed to the Legislative Council, but almost immediately relinquishing both when he was made acting Colonial Treasurer, reverting to Private Secretary in 1851.

In 1850 his assistant William Edward Beddome was convicted of embezzling £4,000, which could only have happened because of lax security on Maturin's part.

In 1857 the Commissariat Department was abolished, and on 1 June 1857 Maturin was relieved by Mr. Deputy Commissioner Monk, and retired on half-pay. He returned to England and was appointed to the Commissariat Department, also to a seat on the London directorate of the Bank of South Australia.

In November 1857 he was appointed Chief Commissioner of the newly formed Adelaide Waterworks Commission. He successfully stood for Light in the South Australian House of Assembly and in July 1858 he resigned his Commission, to be replaced by G. M. Waterhouse. Before he could take his seat however, he was appointed Land Titles Commissioner and resigned from Parliament, taking effect in September 1858. David Shannon won the ensuing by-election.

He accepted a position in London as Deputy Commissary General with a seat on the London board of the Bank of South Australia and left the State in February 1859. In 1863 he was transferred to Hong Kong, then Aldershot in 1865.

He was appointed head of the Control Department in Ireland then in 1871 Director of Supplies and Transports in the War Department following the retirement of Sir William Tyrone Powers KCB. (1819– )

He was appointed Companion of the Order of the Bath, sometime around 1870.

== Family ==
He married Charlotte Owen Bagot (1824 – 22 October 1893), youngest daughter of C. H. Bagot, on 2 October 1845. Among their children were:

- William MacCarthy Maturin (13 October 1850 – 1932) married Mary Frederica Maria Beaumont (1863–1906) on 26 September 1899
- Charles Edward Maturin (8 February 1855 – )
- Desmond Clibborn Maturin (15 Jul 1858 – )
- Norman Hugh Dutton Maturin (1 Dec 1862 – )

== Recognition ==
Maturin Street in Glenelg is close to where he resided.

== Augustus Maturin ==
Augustus Scott Maturin emigrated on the voyage as his brother William. In 1847 he was appointed second clerk in the Audit Office. On 18 September 1852 he married Harriet Louisa Evans of Bath, Somerset.

In 1853 his appointment as second Inspector of Police created such controversy that he resigned, to be replaced by George Hamilton of the Bullion Office, and he was made clerk in the Bullion Office, replacing George Hamilton. In June 1854 he became Bookkeeper of the Goolwa Railway, then in November 1854 he was appointed to the courts of Port Elliot, Goolwa and Encounter Bay.

In January 1855 he was charged with the 1854 theft of a gold ingot valued at £57 belonging to Frederick Burt while at the Bullion Office. He pleaded guilty, explaining he had diverted the ingot to cover for a discrepancy. Despite character references from a number of influential people, he was sentenced to a year's imprisonment. As often happens with notables who fall from grace, further references to him in the news media are hard to find. One report has him released after seven months and moving interstate under the assumed name of Collison.
