= 1857 South Australian colonial election =

- 9 March 1857

All 36 seats in the House of Assembly All 18 seats in the Legislative Council
- Registered: 12,235 (Note: Total enrolment across all electorates, including those uncontested, was 15,538.)
- Turnout: 6,877 (56.2%)
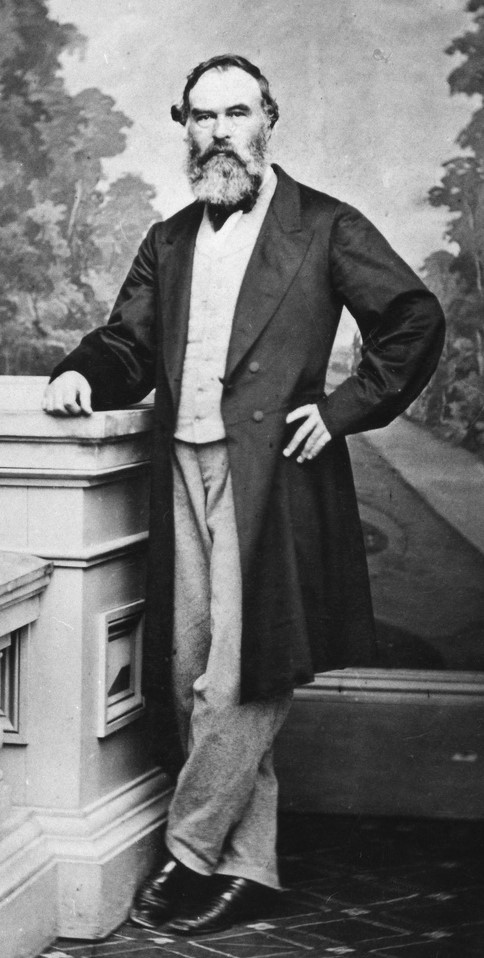
Leader	Boyle Travers Finniss
Leader's seat	City of Adelaide
- Results by electoral district for the House of Assembly
Premier before election
Boyle Travers Finniss
Elected Premier
Boyle Travers Finniss

A colonial election was held on 9 March 1857 to elect members to the 1st Parliament of South Australia. All 36 seats in the House of Assembly (the lower house), and all 18 seats in the Legislative Council (the upper house) were up for election. Prior to the election, Boyle Travers Finniss led a government which was formed to administer the election and to establish the first responsible government.

The election used non-compulsory approval voting, in which electors deleted the names of candidates they did not support. Members of the House of Assembly were elected to 17 multi-member districts; most districts had two members, with the exception of City of Adelaide (6 members), The Burra and Clare (3), Flinders (1), The Murray (1), and Victoria (1). Members of the Legislative Council were elected in a single 18-member district. Suffrage extended to men (including Aboriginal men) over 21 years of age (who owned property worth at least £50, for the Legislative Council), unless they were "attainted or convicted of treason or felony".

No parties or solid groupings would be formed until after the 1890 election, which resulted in frequent changes of the Premier. If the incumbent Premier lost sufficient support through a successful motion of no confidence at any time, he would tender his resignation to the Governor, which would result in another member being elected and sworn in by the Governor as the next Premier.

== Results ==
=== House of Assembly ===
House of Assembly (AV) – Turnout 56.2% (Non-CV)
Party	Votes			Seats	
Party	Votes	%	Swing (pp)	Seats	Change
Independent	16,115	100.0	New	36	▲36
Total	16,115	100.0	–	36	▲36
Formal votes	N/A (Note: Informal voting details were not published for Mount Barker, The Sturt, and Yatala. In the other eight electorates, the formal vote was 6,877 (96.9%) and the informal votes was 218 (3.1%).)	–	–		
Informal votes	N/A	–	–		
Turnout	6,877	56.2	+56.2		
Enrolled voters	12,235	–	–		
Source: Electoral Commission of South Australia

=== Legislative Council ===
Legislative Council (BV) – Turnout 56.7% (Non-CV)
Party	Votes			Seats			
Party	Votes	%	Swing (pp)	Seats won	Not up	New Total	Change
Independent	66,842	100.0	±0.0	18	0	18	Steady
Total	66,842	100.0	–	18	0	18	
Formal votes	4,942	86.4	+86.4				
Informal votes	775	13.6	+13.6				
Turnout	5,717	56.7	+56.7				
Enrolled voters	10,092	–	–				
Source: Electoral Commission of South Australia

== See also ==
- Members of the South Australian Legislative Council, 1857–1861
- Members of the South Australian House of Assembly, 1857–1860
