= 1859 City of Adelaide colonial by-election =

← 1858	13 May 1859	1860 →

Electoral district of City of Adelaide in the South Australian House of Assembly
- Registered: 3,384
- Turnout: 993 (29.3%)
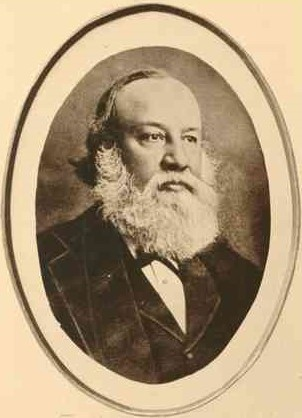
	WO		JP
Candidate	William Owen	Neville Blyth	Joseph Peacock
FPTP vote	668	224	3
Percentage	74.6%	25.0%	0.3%
MHA before election
William Henville Burford
Elected MHA
William Owen

The 1859 City of Adelaide colonial by-election was held on 13 May 1859 to elect one of six members for City of Adelaide in the South Australian House of Assembly, after sitting member William Henville Burford resigned on 29 April 1859.

William Owen won the by-election with 41 per cent of the vote.

== Background ==
The by-election was trigged after William Henville Burford resigned on 29 April 1859.

=== 1857 election result ===
1857 South Australian colonial election: City of Adelaide
Candidate	Votes	%	±
Robert Richard Torrens (elected 1)	1,208	16.0	+16.0
Richard Davies Hanson (elected 2)	1,179	15.6	+15.6
Francis Stacker Dutton (elected 3)	1,145	15.2	+15.2
Boyle Travers Finniss (elected 4)	1,103	14.6	+14.6
John Bentham Neales (elected 5)	959	12.7	+12.7
William Henville Burford (elected 6)	620	8.2	+8.2
Patrick Boyce Coglin	413	5.5	+5.5
William Parkin	325	4.3	+4.3
W Pearce	310	4.1	+4.1
EC Homersham	272	3.6	+3.6
Total formal votes	1,703	94.9	+94.9
Informal votes	92	5.1	+5.1
Turnout	1,795	52.8	+52.8

=== 1858 by-election result ===
1858 City of Adelaide colonial by-election
Candidate	Votes	%	±
Judah Moss Solomon	819	72.5	+72.5
M Smith	310	27.5	+27.5
Total formal votes	516	98.7	+2.1
Informal votes	7	1.3	–2.2
Turnout	523	70.9	–9.3

== Results ==
1859 City of Adelaide colonial by-election
Candidate	Votes	%	±
William Owen	668	74.6	+74.6
Neville Blyth	224	25.0	+25.0
Joseph Peacock	3	0.3	+0.3
Total formal votes	895	90.1	–8.6
Informal votes	98	9.9	+8.6
Turnout	993	29.3	–41.6

== See also ==
- List of South Australian House of Assembly by-elections
