= 1860 South Australian House of Assembly election =

1860 South Australian colonial election (House of Assembly)
- 9 March – 3 April 1860
- All 36 seats in the South Australian House of Assembly
- Turnout: N/A (Note: Turnout was not published for Barossa and Mount Barker. In the other ten electorates, the turnout was 6,409 (43.7%).)
| Party | Leader | Vote % | Seats | +/– |
|---|---|---|---|---|
| Independents | N/A | 100.0 | 36 | 0 |
This lists parties that won seats. See the complete results below.
Results by electoral district
| Premier before | Premier after |
|---|---|
| Richard Hanson | Richard Hanson |

The 1860 South Australian House of Assembly election was held between 9 March and 3 April 1860 to elect all 36 members of the South Australian House of Assembly as part of the 1860 South Australian colonial election.

== Overall results ==
House of Assembly (AV) – Turnout N/A (Non-CV)
| Party | Votes | | | Seats | |
| Party | Votes | % | Swing (pp) | Seats | Change |
|---|---|---|---|---|---|
| Independent | 16,495 | 100.0 | ±0.0 | 36 | Steady |
| Total | 16,495 | 100.0 | – | 36 | |
| Formal votes | N/A (Note: Informal voting details were not published for Barossa, Mount Barker, and Port Adelaide. In the other nine electorates, the formal vote was 5,389 (92.2%) and the informal vote was 493 (8.4%).) | – | – | | |
| Informal votes | N/A | – | – | | |
| Turnout | N/A | – | – | | |
| Enrolled voters | 17,681 (Note: Total enrolment across all electorates, including those uncontested, was 22,265.) | – | – | | |
Source: Electoral Commission of South Australia

== Results by district ==
=== Uncontested ===
| Electoral district | Members elected |
|---|---|
| Flinders | William James Browne |
| Gumeracha | Arthur Blyth; Alexander Hay |
| Light | John Tuthill Bagot; Francis Dutton |
| The Murray | David Wark |
| Onkaparinga | William Milne; William Townsend |

=== City of Adelaide ===
1860 South Australian colonial election: City of Adelaide
| Candidate | Votes | % | ± |
|---|---|---|---|
| Thomas Reynolds (elected 1) | 1,036 | 15.4 | +15.4 |
| Matthew Moorhouse (elected 2) | 935 | 13.9 | +13.9 |
| Philip Santo (elected 3) | 883 | 13.1 | +13.1 |
| Samuel Bakewell (elected 4) | 766 | 11.4 | +11.4 |
| Richard Hanson (elected 5) | 656 | 9.8 | –5.8 |
| William Parkin (elected 6) | 635 | 9.4 | –5.1 |
| W Osborne | 608 | 9.0 | +9.0 |
| Boyle Travers Finniss | 583 | 8.7 | –5.9 |
| Francis Dutton | 368 | 5.5 | –9.7 |
| Edward Collett Homersham | 252 | 3.7 | +0.1 |
| Total formal votes | 1,414 | 91.9 | +1.8 |
| Informal votes | 138 | 8.9 | –1.0 |
| Turnout | 1,552 | 45.9 | +16.6 |

=== Barossa ===
1860 South Australian colonial election: Barossa
| Candidate | Votes | % | ± |
|---|---|---|---|
| Edward Grundy (elected 1) | 270 | 41.2 | +41.2 |
| Walter Duffield (elected 2) | 203 | 31.0 | –5.3 |
| Thomas Giles | 181 | 27.7 | +27.7 |
| Total formal votes | N/A | – | – |
| Informal votes | 62 | – | – |
| Turnout | N/A | – | – |

=== The Burra and Clare ===
1860 South Australian colonial election: The Burra and Clare
| Candidate | Votes | % | ± |
|---|---|---|---|
| William Dale (elected 1) | 645 | 24.7 | +24.7 |
| George Cole (elected 2) | 641 | 24.5 | +24.5 |
| William Lennon (elected 3) | 630 | 24.1 | +24.1 |
| George Strickland Kingston | 312 | 11.9 | –19.1 |
| JH Browne | 226 | 8.7 | +8.7 |
| L Cullen | 157 | 6.0 | +6.0 |
| Total formal votes | 932 | 89.9 | +89.9 |
| Informal votes | 105 | 10.1 | +10.1 |
| Turnout | 1,037 | 36.2 | +36.2 |

=== East Torrens ===
1860 South Australian colonial election: East Torrens
| Candidate | Votes | % | ± |
|---|---|---|---|
| Henry Mildred (elected 1) | 486 | 43.5 | +43.5 |
| Neville Blyth (elected 2) | 350 | 31.3 | +31.3 |
| Lavington Glyde | 282 | 25.2 | +25.2 |
| Total formal votes | 702 | 94.0 | +94.0 |
| Informal votes | 45 | 6.0 | +6.0 |
| Turnout | 747 | 51.9 | +51.9 |

=== Encounter Bay ===
1860 South Australian colonial election: Encounter Bay
| Candidate | Votes | % | ± |
|---|---|---|---|
| John Lindsay (elected 1) | 221 | 39.5 | +8.5 |
| Henry Strangways (elected 2) | 179 | 32.0 | +32.0 |
| R Higgins | 160 | 28.6 | +28.6 |
| Total formal votes | 321 | 97.0 | +0.4 |
| Informal votes | 10 | 3.0 | –0.4 |
| Turnout | 331 | 32.1 | +25.8 |

=== Mount Barker ===
1860 South Australian colonial election: Mount Barker
| Candidate | Votes | % | ± |
|---|---|---|---|
| Boyle Travers Finniss (elected 1) | 564 | 41.9 | +41.9 |
| John Dunn (elected 2) | 332 | 25.0 | –7.4 |
| William Rogers | 331 | 24.6 | –27.6 |
| Thomas Biddles | 119 | 8.8 | +8.8 |
| Total formal votes | N/A | – | – |
| Informal votes | 36 | – | – |
| Turnout | N/A | – | – |

=== Noarlunga ===
1860 South Australian colonial election: Noarlunga
| Candidate | Votes | % | ± |
|---|---|---|---|
| David Sutherland (elected 1) | 256 | 38.8 | +38.8 |
| Alexander Anderson (elected 2) | 240 | 36.4 | +10.7 |
| Charles Thomas Hewett | 163 | 24.7 | +24.7 |
| Total formal votes | 390 | 92.4 | –6.1 |
| Informal votes | 32 | 7.6 | +6.1 |
| Turnout | 422 | 37.5 | –25.3 |

=== Port Adelaide ===
1860 South Australian colonial election: Port Adelaide
| Candidate | Votes | % | ± |
|---|---|---|---|
| William Owen (elected 1) | 315 | 37.3 | +37.3 |
| Patrick Boyce Coglin (elected 2) | 290 | 34.3 | +34.3 |
| John Neales | 240 | 28.4 | +28.4 |
| Total formal votes | N/A | – | – |
| Informal votes | N/A | – | – |
| Turnout | 527 | – | – |

=== The Sturt ===
1860 South Australian colonial election: The Sturt
| Candidate | Votes | % | ± |
|---|---|---|---|
| Joseph Peacock (elected 1) | 223 | 40.8 | +40.8 |
| John Hallett (elected 2) | 163 | 29.9 | +7.0 |
| Richard Bullock Andrews | 160 | 29.3 | +29.3 |
| Total formal votes | 511 | 93.6 | N/A |
| Informal votes | 35 | 6.4 | N/A |
| Turnout | 546 | 58.6 | N/A |

=== Victoria ===
1860 South Australian colonial election: Victoria
| Candidate | Votes | % | ± |
|---|---|---|---|
| George Charles Hawker (elected 1) | 242 | 66.1 | +66.1 |
| James Umpherston | 124 | 33.9 | +33.9 |
| Total formal votes | 366 | 95.5 | +95.5 |
| Informal votes | 17 | 4.4 | +4.4 |
| Turnout | 383 | 46.4 | +46.4 |

=== West Torrens ===
1860 South Australian colonial election: West Torrens
| Candidate | Votes | % | ± |
|---|---|---|---|
| Thomas Magarey (elected 1) | 319 | 42.0 | +42.0 |
| George Morphett (elected 2) | 229 | 30.1 | +30.1 |
| John Pickering | 212 | 27.9 | +27.9 |
| Total formal votes | 452 | 90.9 | –4.8 |
| Informal votes | 46 | 9.1 | +4.8 |
| Turnout | 498 | 49.8 | –0.2 |

=== Yatala ===
1860 South Australian colonial election: Yatala
| Candidate | Votes | % | ± |
|---|---|---|---|
| Lavington Glyde (elected 1) | 215 | 42.2 | +42.2 |
| Edward McEllister (elected 2) | 190 | 37.3 | +37.3 |
| Edmund Bowman | 87 | 17.1 | +17.1 |
| Thomas Smoker | 17 | 3.3 | +3.3 |
| Total formal votes | 301 | 82.2 | N/A |
| Informal votes | 65 | 17.8 | N/A |
| Turnout | 366 | 35.7 | –54.8 |

== See also ==
- 1860 South Australian Legislative Council by-election
