= 1860 South Australian Legislative Council by-election =

- 3 April 1860

2 (of the 18) seats in the South Australian Legislative Council
- Registered: 13,363
- Turnout: 2,336 (17.5%)
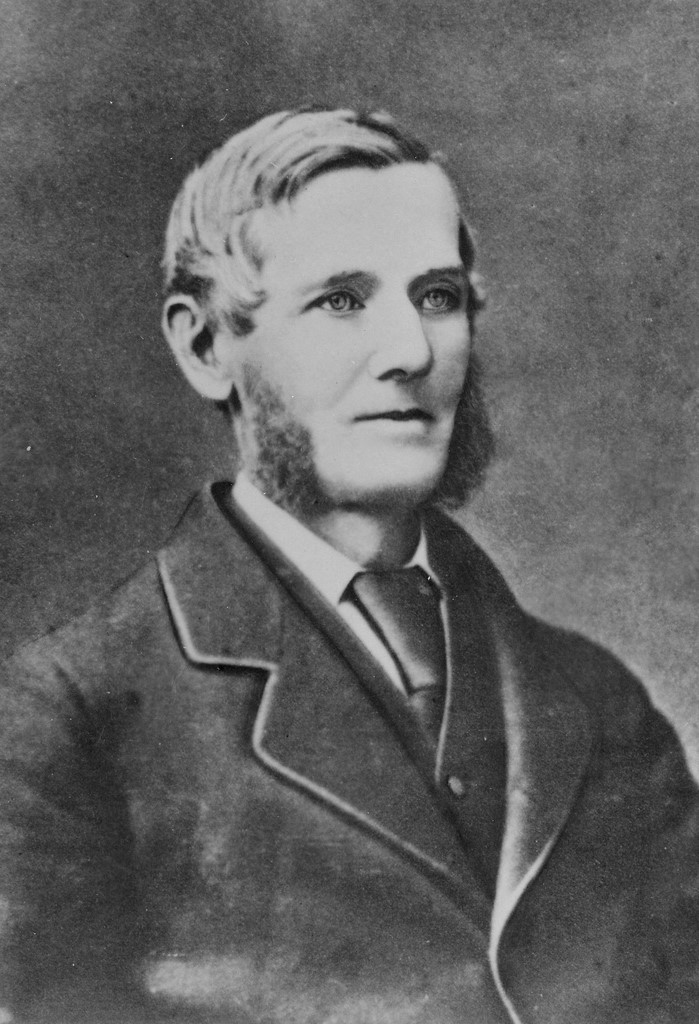

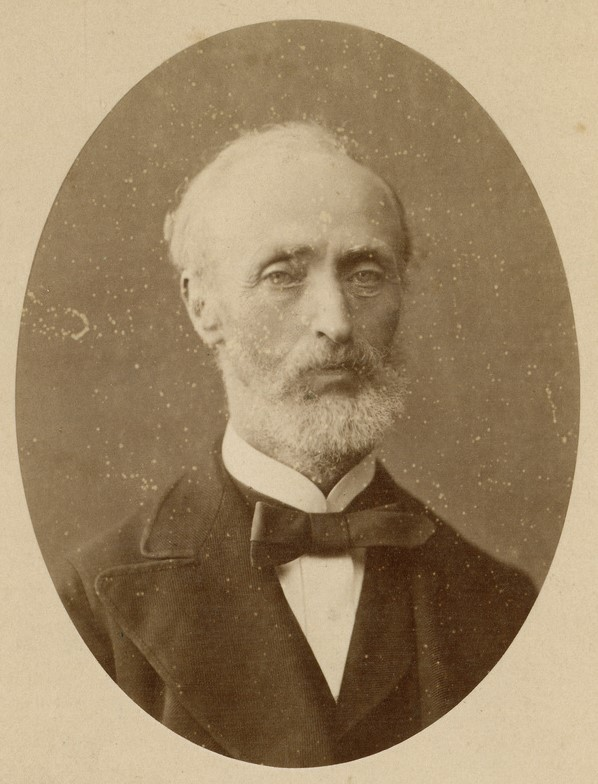

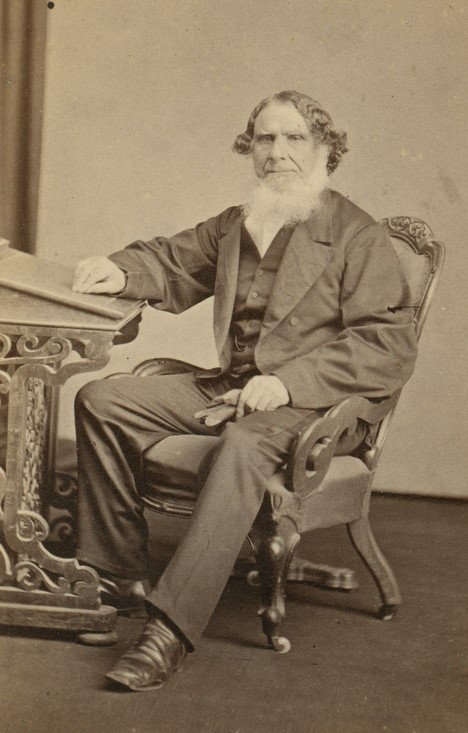
Candidate	George Marsden Waterhouse	George Tinline	Emanuel Solomon
BV vote	1,537	1,405	634
Percentage	38.0%	34.7%	15.7%
Swing	▲38.0 pp	▲34.7 pp	▲13.6 pp

A by-election was held on 3 April 1960 to elect two members to the South Australian Legislative Council, after sitting members Arthur Henry Freeling resigned and Edward Castres Gwynne failed to attend; both were removed on 30 August 1859. The by-election was held during the 1860 colonial election.

George Marsden Waterhouse and George Tinline were elected.

== Background ==
The by-election was triggered after Arthur Henry Freeling resigned and Edward Castres Gwynne failed to attend, both on 30 August 1859.

=== 1857 election result ===
1857 South Australian colonial election: The Province
Candidate	Votes	%	±
Thomas Shuldham O'Halloran (elected 1)	3,499	5.2	+5.2
John Baker (elected 2)	3,475	5.2	+5.2
William Younghusband (elected 3)	3,460	5.2	+5.2
John Morphett (elected 4)	3,339	5.0	+5.0
Edward Castres Gwynne (elected 5)	3,274	4.9	+4.9
Anthony Forster (elected 6)	3,209	4.8	+4.8
Abraham Scott (elected 7)	2,897	4.3	+4.3
Edward Stirling (elected 8)	2,855	4.3	+4.3
William Scott (elected 9)	2,847	4.3	+4.3
James Hurtle Fisher (elected 10)	2,717	4.1	+4.1
George Hall (elected 11)	2,676	4.0	+4.0
Charles Hervey Bagot (elected 12)	2,595	3.9	+3.9
Henry Ayers (elected 13)	2,587	3.9	+3.9
Samuel Davenport (elected 14)	2,488	3.7	+3.7
Arthur Henry Freeling (elected 15)	2,473	3.7	+3.7
Charles Davies (elected 16)	2,363	3.5	+3.5
George Fife Angas (elected 17)	2,316	3.5	+3.5
Charles George Everard (elected 18)	2,177	3.3	+3.3
Thomas Lipson	2,072	3.1	+3.1
David Sutherland	2,053	3.1	+3.1
William Peacock	2,043	3.1	+3.1
Philip Butler	1,920	2.8	+2.8
Arthur Hardy	1,876	2.8	+2.8
Henry Rodolph Wigley	1,545	2.3	+2.3
Emanuel Solomon	1,393	2.1	+2.1
Samuel Stocks	1,361	2.0	+2.0
Henry Strangways	1,332	2.0	+2.0
Total formal votes	4,942	86.4	+86.4
Informal votes	775	13.6	+13.6
Turnout	5,717	56.7	+56.7

== Results ==
Legislative Council (BV) – Turnout 17.5% (Non-CV)
Party	Votes			Seats			
Party	Votes	%	Swing (pp)	Seats won	Not up	New Total	Change
Independent	4,047	100.0	±0.0	2	16	18	Steady
Total	4,047	100.0	–	2	16	18	
Formal votes	2,195	94.0	+7.6				
Informal votes	141	6.0	–7.6				
Turnout	2,336	17.5	–39.2				
Enrolled voters	13,363	–	–				
Source: Electoral Commission of South Australia

=== The Province ===
1860 South Australian Legislative Council by-election: The Province
Candidate	Votes	%	±
George Waterhouse (elected 1)	1,537	38.0	+38.0
George Tinline (elected 2)	1,405	34.7	+34.7
Emanuel Solomon	634	15.7	+13.6
Alfred Watts	387	9.6	+9.6
Arthur Hardy	84	2.1	–0.7
Total formal votes	2,195	94.0	+7.6
Informal votes	141	6.0	–7.6
Turnout	2,336	17.5	–39.2
