= The Silver Whistle =

The Silver Whistle may refer to:

- The Silver Whistle, an 1890 Irish novel by Geraldine Penrose Fitzgerald
- The Silver Whistle (play), a 1948 American comedy-drama by Robert E. McEnroe
- "The Silver Whistle" (Playhouse 90), a 1959 American TV adaptation of McEnroe's play
- "The Silver Whistle", a 1979 American short story by Jay Williams in The Practical Princess and other Liberating Fairy Tales

== See also ==
- Silver Thistle (Carlina acaulis)
