= J. Miller Anderson & Co. =

Adelaide, South Australia, retail drapery business

J. Miller Anderson & Co. Limited was a drapery business in Adelaide, South Australia, generally known as Miller Anderson's, with origins dating back to the city's earliest days. The sign of the company was a golden lamb supported around the middle by a blue ribbon.

== History ==
In 1839 Robert Sanders ( – ) and John Whyte ( – 28 June 1871) as Sanders & Whyte founded a drapery shop at 71 Hindley Street, Adelaide (Sanders and Whyte both came to Adelaide on the Catherine Jamieson in December 1838). The following year Robert Miller started a drapery business Miller & Gale, at 52 Hindley street (on acre 52 opposite Rosina Street). By 1843 the two businesses had disappeared to become Sanders & Miller, which by 1844 had become Miller & Bryden with William Anderson Bryden (Robert Sanders left to start his own shop). This partnership dissolved in June 1848, became Miller & Lucking with James Holmes Lucking. Robert Miller returned to Scotland in late 1848, but maintained his interest in the company. This partnership dissolved in July 1855 and a new entity of Miller, Anderson & Hawkes (with Miller's nephew J. M. Anderson, and Robert Hawkes as partners) was formed. Hawkes died 19 November 1856, and the firm became Miller, Anderson (note comma), then J. Miller Anderson & Co. (no comma) in 1859.

They built a new shop on Hindley Street (replacing Jaffrey's shop "Waterloo House") in 1863, which remained the shop's location for the next century.

The company was floated as Miller Anderson & Co. Ltd. in 1914 or 1915. In the 1920s they built a five-storey building at 16-26 Hindley St and in 1927 they became a public company and were soon acquired by Marcus Clark & Co. of Sydney.

In 1962 Miller Anderson demolished the Theatre Royal (built in 1878) and built Millers Arcade and "exceptionally ugly multilevel carpark" above it.

In 1966 Waltons took over Marcus Clark & Co. and in 1987 Waltons (including the Miller Anderson business) was taken over by the Venture Stores Group.

In 1988 Miller Anderson moved from their iconic building in Hindley street to smaller premises in the Station arcade further down Hindley Street. The relocation was unsuccessful, and after seven months of business there, Miller Anderson passed into receivership in October 1988, ending a distinguished trading history spanning 148 years as the oldest department store in South Australia.

== J. Miller Anderson ==
James Miller Anderson (8 December 1828 – 1 June 1923) was born at Leslie, Fifeshire and started in the drapery business in Dundee. He emigrated to South Australia in September 1849, and joined his uncle Robert Miller's company Miller & Gale. By 1855 he had been made a partner, and the company became J. Miller Anderson & Co. in 1859. The company was floated as Miller Anderson & Co. Ltd. in 1914 or 1915. He achieved what must be some kind of record – 75 years as an executive of the company and 60 years as company head. He never lost his Scots accent and took no part in public life. He married Christina Blackwood Sanders ( – 26 August 1920), daughter of Isabella Sanders (c. 1803 – 30 March 1870), later the second wife of William Owen MP, on 12 February 1862; lived at "Ramornie", Avenel Gardens and Hawkers Road, Medindie. Among their children were:

- David Leslie Anderson (c. 1862 – 26 August 1924) chairman of directors, never married
- J. Miller Anderson, jr. (1865 – 7 April 1920)
- Henry Wheeler "Harry" Anderson (1868– ), director of the company
- eldest daughter Helen "Ellen" or "Nellie" Anderson ( – 20 August 1933) married Walter Henry Wadey LLB (c. 1872 – 23 September 1900) on 16 May 1898
- William Monro Anderson (1870 – 25 August 1921) died in Japan
- Mary McGregor Anderson (1876–1970) of Adelaide
- Allen Doolette Anderson (7 October 1878 – ), of Tamworth, New South Wales

== See also ==
For similar businesses in the early days of South Australia see:

- Charles Moore and Co.
- David Murray (South Australian politician)
- Foy & Gibson
- Harris Scarfe
- Andrew Murray (journalist) of Murray, Greig & Co.
- John Hodgkiss (of Hodgkiss & Co., which became J. Marshall & Co.)
- George Hunt (merchant) (of Hunt, Corry & Co.)
- Robert Alfred Tarlton
- G. & R. Wills & Co.
- William Parkin
- Charles Henry Goode
- Matthew Goode and Co
