= William Fowler (MP for Cambridge) =

English politician

William Fowler MP
- Fowler in 1880

Member of Parliament for Cambridge
- In office 1880–1885 Serving with Hugh Shield
- Preceded by: Alfred Marten
- Succeeded by: Robert Uniacke-Penrose-Fitzgerald
- In office 1868–1874 Serving with Robert Richard Torrens
- Preceded by: Francis Powell
- Succeeded by: Patrick Smollett

Personal details
- Born: 28 July 1828
- Died: September 1905 (aged 77)
- Party: Liberal
- Education: University College London

William Fowler (28 July 1828 – September 1905) was an English Liberal politician who sat in the House of Commons in two periods between 1868 and 1885.

== Biography ==
Fowler was the son of John Fowler of Chapel Nap near Melksham Wiltshire and his wife Rebecca Hull, daughter of William Hull of Uxbridge. He was educated at University College London and was called to bar at Inner Temple in January 1852. He was with Alexander & Co of Lombard Street, London between 1856 and 1877. He was also a J.P. for Essex.

Fowler was elected one of the two members of parliament for Cambridge in 1868, but lost the seat in 1874. He was re-elected for Cambridge at the 1880 general election and held the seat until 1885.

Fowler wrote a number of papers - The Crisis of 1866: a Financial Essay, Mozley and Tyndall on Miracles, an Essay, Thoughts on Free Trade in Land, The Present Aspect of the Land Question and The Limited Ownership of Land. He became the director of several companies and eventually retired to Tunbridge Wells.

Fowler married firstly in 1855 Rachel Maria Howard, daughter of Robert Howard of Tottenham. He married secondly in 1871 Elizabeth Fox Tuckett daughter of Francis Tuckett of Frenchay Gloucestershire. He married thirdly Rachel Leatham widow of C Albert Leatham and daughter of Joseph Pease. His brother was the agricultural engineer John Fowler. His sister Mary Jane Fowler married Edward Aldam Leatham.

Parliament of the United Kingdom
Preceded by John Eldon Gorst; Francis Powell	Member of Parliament for Cambridge; 1868 – 1874; With: Robert Torrens	Succeeded by Patrick Smollett; Alfred Marten
