= 1860 South Australian colonial election =

- 9 March – 3 April 1860

All 36 seats in the House of Assembly 2 (of the 18) seats in the Legislative Council
- Registered: 17,681 (Note: Total enrolment across all electorates, including those uncontested, was 22,265.)
- Turnout: N/A (Note: Turnout was not published for Barossa and Mount Barker. In the other ten electorates, the turnout was 6,409 (43.7%).)
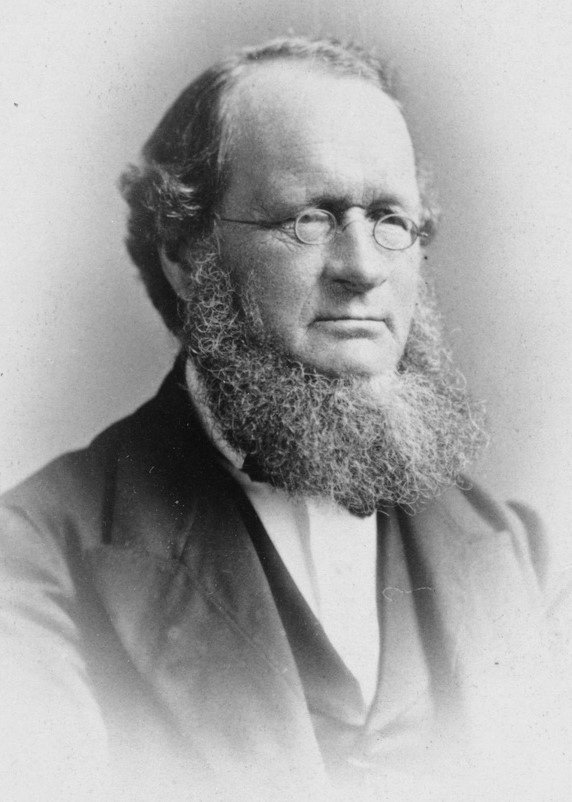
Leader	Richard Hanson
Leader's seat	City of Adelaide
- Results by electoral district for the House of Assembly
Premier before election
Richard Hanson
Elected Premier
Richard Hanson

A colonial election was held between 9 March and 3 April 1860 to elect members to the 2nd Parliament of South Australia. All 36 seats in the House of Assembly (the lower house), and two of the 18 seats in the Legislative Council (the upper house, which had two casual vacancies to be filled) were up for re-election.

Since the 1857 election, four different premiers had led Parliament: Boyle Travers Finniss, John Baker, Robert Richard Torrens, and Richard Hanson.

The election used non-compulsory plurality block voting, in which electors voted for as many candidates as they wished. Members of the House of Assembly were elected to 17 multi-member districts; most districts had two members, with the exception of City of Adelaide (6 members), The Burra and Clare (3), Flinders (1), The Murray (1), and Victoria (1). Members of the Legislative Council were elected in a single 18-member district. Suffrage extended to men (including Aboriginal men) over 21 years of age (who owned property worth at least £50, for the Legislative Council), unless they were "attainted or convicted of treason or felony".

No parties or solid groupings would be formed until after the 1890 election, which resulted in frequent changes of the Premier. If the incumbent Premier lost sufficient support through a successful motion of no confidence at any time, he would tender his resignation to the Governor, which would result in another member being elected and sworn in by the Governor as the next Premier.

== Results ==
=== House of Assembly ===
House of Assembly (AV) – Turnout N/A (Non-CV)
Party	Votes			Seats	
Party	Votes	%	Swing (pp)	Seats	Change
Independent	16,495	100.0	±0.0	36	Steady
Total	16,495	100.0	–	36	
Formal votes	N/A (Note: Informal voting details were not published for Barossa, Mount Barker, and Port Adelaide. In the other nine electorates, the formal vote was 5,389 (92.2%) and the informal vote was 493 (8.4%).)	–	–		
Informal votes	N/A	–	–		
Turnout	N/A	–	–		
Enrolled voters	17,681	–	–		
Source: Electoral Commission of South Australia

=== Legislative Council ===
Legislative Council (BV) – Turnout 17.5% (Non-CV)
Party	Votes			Seats			
Party	Votes	%	Swing (pp)	Seats won	Not up	New Total	Change
Independent	4,047	100.0	±0.0	2	16	18	Steady
Total	4,047	100.0	–	2	16	18	
Formal votes	2,195	94.0	+7.6				
Informal votes	141	6.0	–7.6				
Turnout	2,336	17.5	–39.2				
Enrolled voters	13,363	–	–				
Source: Electoral Commission of South Australia

== See also ==
- Members of the South Australian Legislative Council, 1857–1861
- Members of the South Australian Legislative Council, 1861–1865
- Members of the South Australian House of Assembly, 1860–1862
