= Alfred Marten =

British politician (1829–1910)

Sir Alfred George Marten, QC (8 November 1829 – 22 June 1910, in St Leonards-on-Sea) was an English politician and barrister. He was Member of Parliament for Cambridge, between 1874 and 1880, as a member of the Conservative Party. In 1896, he was appointed a County Court Judge.

== Life ==
Alfred George Marten was born in 1829 into a non-conformist family, the third son of Robert Giles Marten of Plaistow, Essex. His father's and grandfather's business was in shipbroking and insurance in the city of London. However, both his father and grandfather died in 1839. Alfred went to Mill Hill School and then on to St John's College Cambridge. He qualified as a barrister at the Inner Temple and became a fellow of St John's in 1870.

He married Patricia Barrington Kennett, dau. of Capt. Vincent Frederick Kennett, and sister of Vincent Kennett-Barrington, in 1869. His children included Sir Amberson Barrington Marten and Sir Clarence Henry Kennett Marten.

He died in St Leonards-on-Sea in 1910, aged 80.

== Sources ==
- Leigh Rayment's Historical List of MPs
- "The Marten Papers held at Cambridge University Library", nationalarchives.gov.uk. Accessed 6 January 2023.
- "History Site of the Marten Family of Plaistow"

Parliament of the United Kingdom
Preceded by Sir Robert Torrens; William Fowler	Member of Parliament for Cambridge; 1874 – 1880; With: Patrick Smollett	Succeeded by William Fowler; Hugh Shield
