= List of shipwrecks in July 1848 =

The list of shipwrecks in July 1848 includes ships sunk, foundered, wrecked, grounded, or otherwise lost during July 1848.

== 1 July ==
List of shipwrecks: 1 July 1848
Ship	State	Description
Anna Maria	Denmark	The ship was abandoned in the Baltic Sea off Gotland, Sweden. Her crew were rescued. She was on a voyage from Copenhagen to Riga, Russia.
Lady Cremorne	United Kingdom	The ship ran aground in the Saint Lawrence River. Her crew were rescued. She was on a voyage from Gibraltar to Quebec City, Province of Canada, British North America.
Reaper	United Kingdom	The ship was driven ashore and wrecked at Thornham, Norfolk. She was on a voyage from Sunderland, County Durham to Brancaster, Norfolk.

== 2 July ==
List of shipwrecks: July 1848
Ship	State	Description
Aegir	Sweden	The ship was driven ashore at Figueira da Foz, Portugal. She was on a voyage from Stockholm to Figueira da Foz. She was refloated on 5 July and taken in to port.
Ann	United Kingdom	The ship was wrecked on the Anholt Reef, in the Baltic Sea. Her crew were rescued. She was on a voyage from Liverpool, Lancashire to Narva, Russia.

== 3 July ==
List of shipwrecks: 3 July 1848
Ship	State	Description
Louis	France	The lugger was abandoned off the Longships. Her crew were rescued. She was on a voyage from Swansea, Glamorgan, United Kingdom to Saint-Brieuc, Côtes-du-Nord.
Susan Ann	United Kingdom	The ship ran aground on the Hardbrick Rock, in Tor Bay. She was refloated and resumed her voyage.

== 5 July ==
List of shipwrecks: 5 July 1848
Ship	State	Description
Emma	United Kingdom	The sloop was in collision with the schooner Fame (United Kingdom) and was severely damaged. She was towed in to South Shields, County Durham and beached. She was on a voyage from Port Dundas, Renfrewshire to Newcastle upon Tyne, Northumberland.
John Renwick	United Kingdom	The barque was wrecked on a reef in the Pacific Ocean (36°59′30″S 73°45′30″W). Her crew were rescued. She was on a voyage from Ascension Island to Valparaíso, Chile.
Matilda	(United Kingdom of Great Britain and Ireland) New Zealand	The cutter was driven ashore near the entrance to Wellington Harbour, New Zealand, by a southeasterly gale, with the loss of both crewmen.
Wave	United Kingdom	The brig was driven ashore in Cheyne Bay. She was refloated but consequently sank. Her crew were rescued. She was on a voyage from Adelaide, South Australia to Singapore.

== 6 July ==
List of shipwrecks: 6 July 1848
Ship	State	Description
Edward and Mary	United Kingdom	The sloop sank in the River Ouse. she was on a voyage from Colchester, Essex to Leeds or Wakefield, Yorkshire.
Hindostan	United Kingdom	The ship was damaged by fire near New Orleans, Louisiana. She was on a voyage from New Orleans to Liverpool, Lancashire.
Mercer	United Kingdom	The ship was wrecked at Toolse, Russia. Her crew were rescued. She was on a voyage from Liverpool to Kunda, Russia.
Sultana	United Kingdom	The ship was wrecked on North Cape, Prince Edward Island, British North America. She was on a voyage from Shediac, New Brunswick, British North America to Liverpool.

== 7 July ==
List of shipwrecks: 7 July 1848
Ship	State	Description
Gallinipper	United States	The 95-foot (29 m) trading schooner sank at Beaver Island in Lake Michigan. She was refloated, repaired, and returned to service.
Hebe	Norway	The ship was wrecked 7 leagues (21 nautical miles (39 km) north-northwest of Ilhéus, Brazil. Her crew were rescued. She was on a voyage from Rio de Janeiro to Bahia, Brazil.
Industry	United Kingdom	The ship was driven ashore and wrecked at Dingle, County Kerry, Ireland. Her crew were rescued.
Sea Witch	United Kingdom	The ship was driven ashore and damaged at Fourah Bay, Sierra Leone. She was later refloated and repaired.

== 9 July ==
List of shipwrecks: 9 July 1848
Ship	State	Description
Elizabeth	(United Kingdom of Great Britain and Ireland) New South Wales	The ship was driven ashore at Sydney. All on board were rescued. She was on a voyage from Twofold Bay to Sydney.
Jeune Petite Courbe	France	The ship ran aground on the Gedges, at the mouth of the Helford River. She was on a voyage from Newcastle upon Tyne, Northumberland, United Kingdom to "Bon". She was refloated and towed into Falmouth, Cornwall, United Kingdom by the steam tug Sydney (United Kingdom).
Wanderer	(United Kingdom of Great Britain and Ireland) Van Diemen's Land	The ship was wrecked in Sydney Harbour with the loss of all but one of her crew. She was on a voyage from Launceston to Sydney, New South Wales.

== 10 July ==
List of shipwrecks: 10 July 1848
Ship	State	Description
Nankin	United Kingdom	The ship sprang a leak and was abandoned in the Indian Ocean. All on board were rescued by Futta Mombarak ( India). Nankin was on a voyage from Calcutta, India to London.
Wakona	United States	The ship was abandoned in the Atlantic Ocean. Her crew were rescued by Andalusia (United States). Wakona was on a voyage from Liverpool, Lancashire, United Kingdom for Baltimore, Maryland. Wreckage from the ship subsequently washed up at Bideford, Devon.
Williams	United Kingdom	The ship was wrecked in the Magdalen Islands, Nova Scotia, British North America. Her crew were rescued. She was on a voyage from Restigouche, Nova Scotia to Newcastle upon Tyne, Northumberland.

== 11 July ==
List of shipwrecks: 11 July 1848
Ship	State	Description
Greenlaw	United Kingdom	The ship was wrecked at Coringa, India with the loss of all but three of those on board. She was on a voyage from London to Calcutta, India.

== 13 July ==
List of shipwrecks: 13 July 1848
Ship	State	Description
Effingham	United Kingdom	The ship was driven ashore on Jeremy Island, Province of Canada, British North America. She was on a voyage from Quebec City, Province of Canada to the Clyde.

== 14 July ==
List of shipwrecks: 14 July 1848
Ship	State	Description
David	(United Kingdom of Great Britain and Ireland) British North America	The ship was driven ashore on Brier Island, Nova Scotia. She was on a voyage from Liverpool, Lancashire to Saint John, New Brunswick. She was refloated and resumed her voyage.
Lucy	(United Kingdom of Great Britain and Ireland) British North America	The ship was wrecked on the Middle Caucus. She was on a voyage from Boston, Massachusetts, United States to Laguna.

== 15 July ==
List of shipwrecks: 15 July 1848
Ship	State	Description
Briton	United Kingdom	The ship was driven ashore on "Moose Pecca Island". She was on a voyage from Boston, Massachusetts, United States to Saint John, New Brunswick, British North America. She was refloated in a waterlogged condition.
Hazard	United Kingdom	The ship ran aground on the Punta Mala, off the coast of Spain. She was on a voyage from Cardiff, Glamorgan to Gibraltar. She was refloated.
Warrior	United Kingdom	The ship ran aground on the Falsterbo Reef, in the Baltic Sea. She was on a voyage from Liverpool, Lancashire to Königsberg, Prussia. She was refloated and resumed her voyage.

== 16 July ==
List of shipwrecks: 16 July 1848
Ship	State	Description
Esther	United Kingdom	The yacht was wrecked on the West Hoyle, in Liverpool Bay. Her crew were rescued by the Hoylake Lifeboat.
Isabella Heron	United Kingdom	The ship ran aground on the Falsterbo Reef, in the Baltic Sea. She was on a voyage from Liverpool, Lancashire to Pillau, Prussia. She was refloated and resumed her voyage.
Newton	United Kingdom	The ship was driven ashore on Læsø, Denmark. She was on a voyage from Cádiz, Spain to Saint Petersburg, Russia. She was refloated and resumed her voyage.
Nusser	India	The ship was loss on the Reef Boy with the loss of all but eleven of her crew.

== 17 July ==
List of shipwrecks: 17 July 1848
Ship	State	Description
Kedron	United States	The ship ran aground on Neckman's Ground, in the Baltic Sea. She was on a voyage from Boston, Massachusetts to Charleston, South Carolina and Reval, Russia.
O'Connell	United Kingdom	The ship ran aground on the Domesnes Reef, in the Baltic Sea off thc coast of Russia.

== 18 July ==
List of shipwrecks: 18 July 1848
Ship	State	Description
Henriette Maria	Netherlands	The ship ran aground and was damaged in the Patience Straits. She was refloated.
Sprightly	United Kingdom	The ship ran aground on the Klein Vogelsand, in the North Sea. She was on a voyage from Hamburg to Hull, Yorkshire. She was refloated and put in to Cuxhaven in a leaky condition.

== 19 July ==
List of shipwrecks: 19 July 1848
Ship	State	Description
Helena	United Kingdom	The ship was wrecked on Prince Edward Island, British North America. She was on a voyage from Prince Edward Island to Liverpool, Lancashire.
Industry	United Kingdom	The ship ran aground on the Angus Rock, in Strangford Lough. She was on a voyage from Cardiff, Glamorgan to Strangford, County Down. She was refloated and beached.
Maria Therese	France	The ship was driven ashore and damaged at Saint-Valery-sur-Somme, Somme. She was on a voyage from "Bouc" to Saint-Valery-sur-Somme.
Trial	United Kingdom	The ship sprang a leak and was beached at the mouth of the River Tees.

== 20 July ==
List of shipwrecks: 20 July 1848
Ship	State	Description
Bagnall	United Kingdom	The schooner capsized off Blakeney, Norfolk with the loss of four of the eight people on board. Survivors were rescued by the smack Mary and Theodosia (United Kingdom) Bagnall was on a voyage from Wisbech, Cambridgeshire to Londonderry.
David Paddock	United States	The ship, full and bound home, struck a sunken rock while attempting to enter the Sea of Okhotsk via La Pérouse Strait. All hands were saved by the ship Globe (United States) while a portion of the cargo were salvaged by several vessels, including the ships Caravan and Samuel Robertson (both United States).
Duke of Wellington, and Victoria	United Kingdom	The ships were in collision in the Hooghly River and were beached. They were both on a voyage from Liverpool, Lancashire to Calcutta, India. They were refloated and taken in to Calcutta for repairs.
Jeune Emmanuel	France	The ship was destroyed in the Loire.

== 21 July ==
List of shipwrecks: 21 July 1848
Ship	State	Description
Cornelia	United Kingdom	The ship ran ashore at Middleton Point, New York, United States. She was on a voyage from New York to Liverpool, Lancashire. She was refloated and resumed her voyage.
Helena	United Kingdom	The ship sprang a leak and was abandoned in the North Sea 70 nautical miles (130 km) of Scarborough, Yorkshire. Her crew were rescued by Diadem (United Kingdom). Helena was on a voyage from Newcastle upon Tyne, Northumberland to Tønning, Duchy of Holstein.
Marjory	United Kingdom	The ship was driven ashore north of Ventava, Courland Governorate. She was on a voyage from Riga, Russia to London.
HMS Ranger	Royal Navy	The Alert-class brig-sloop ran aground in Porto Grande Bay, Cape Verde Islands. She was refloated.

== 22 July ==
List of shipwrecks: 22 July 1848
Ship	State	Description
Oaks	United Kingdom	The ship sank in the North Sea off Kilnsea, Yorkshire.

== 23 July ==
List of shipwrecks: 23 July 1848
Ship	State	Description
Active	United Kingdom	The ship was holed by her anchor and sank. She was later refloated, repaired and sailed for Liverpool, Lancashire.
Elizabeth and Jane	United Kingdom	The ship was abandoned in the Atlantic Ocean. Her crew were rescued by Revanche (France).
Mary Louise	United Kingdom	The ship was wrecked on Discovery's Western Bank, in the Carmiata Passage. Her crew survived. She was on a voyage from Singapore to London.
Sappho	United Kingdom	The ship ran aground in the River Plate. She was on a voyage from Liverpool, Lancashire to Montevideo, Uruguay. She was refloated on 1 August with assistance from the brig Arno (United Kingdom) and HMS Lizard (Royal Navy) and taken in to Montevideo.

== 24 July ==
List of shipwrecks: 24 July 1848
Ship	State	Description
Enmore	United Kingdom	The ship ran aground and was damaged off Adelaide, South Australia. She was on a voyage from Adelaide to London. She was refloated and put back to Adelaide.
Intrepide Corse	France	The brig was driven ashore on the coast of Venezuela. She was on a voyage from La Guaira, Venezuela to Havre de Grâce, Seine-Inférieure. She was refloated, resuming her voyage on 27 July.
Solway	United Kingdom	The ship ran aground on the Drumroof Bank, in the Solway Firth, and sank. She was on a voyage from Quebec City, Province of Canada, British North America to Dumfries. She was refloated and beached 2 nautical miles (3.7 km) north of the Southerness Lighthouse, Dumfriesshire.

== 25 July ==
List of shipwrecks: 25 July 1848
Ship	State	Description
Catharine	United Kingdom	The brig was driven ashore at Cayton, Yorkshire. She was on a voyage from Seaham, County Durham to King's Lynn, Norfolk. She was later refloated and taken in to Scarborough, Yorkshire.
Charles Jeffry	United Kingdom	The ship was driven ashore at the mouth of the Lymington River. She was refloated the next day.
Minerva	United Kingdom	The ship was driven ashore at "Kilva Mahim", India and abandoned by her crew. She was on a voyage from Bombay, India for Liverpool, Lancashire. Minerva was taken in to Bombay in a derelict condition on 5 August.
Triumph	United Kingdom	The ship was wrecked on a reef off Makassar, Netherlands East Indies. She was on a voyage from Makassar to Singapore.

== 26 July ==
List of shipwrecks: July 1848
Ship	State	Description
Eole	France	The brig sprang a leak and foundered in the English Channel off St. Catherine's Point, Isle of Wight, United Kingdom. Her crew were rescued by the chasse-marée Jeune Henri (France).
George	United Kingdom	The ship was wrecked in the Eider. She was on a voyage from Newcastle upon Tyne, Northumberland to Delve, Duchy of Schleswig.
Lucy	United Kingdom	The ship ran aground on the Gunfleet Sand, in the North Sea off the coast of Essex. She was on a voyage from London to Dundee, Forfarshire. She was refloated and taken in to Great Yarmouth, Norfolk in a leaky condition.
Mary Salter	United Kingdom	The ship was wrecked in the Eider. She was on a voyage from Inverkeithing, Fife to Tønning, Duchy of Holstein.
Trinity	United Kingdom	The ship struck the Blond Rock, off Cape Sable Island, Nova Scotia, British North America. She was beached 10 nautical miles (19 km) north of Yarmouth, Nova Scotia and was consequently condemneed. She was on a voyage from Saint John, New Brunswick, British North America to Limerick.
Unity	United Kingdom	The ship was driven ashore in the Eider. She was on a voyage from Newcastle upon Tyne to Tønning. She was refloated and taken in to Büsum, Duchy of Schleswig.
Waterwitch	United Kingdom	The steamship sprang a leak and sank near the Malden Lights. Her crew were rescued. She was on a voyage from Troon, Ayrshire to Belfast, County Antrim.

== 27 July ==
List of shipwrecks: 27 July 1848
Ship	State	Description
Ebenezer	United Kingdom	The schooner ran aground at Whitby, Yorkshire. She was refloated and resumed her voyage.

== 28 July ==
List of shipwrecks: 28 July 1848
Ship	State	Description
Invincible	United Kingdom	The ship foundered in the Atlantic Ocean. Her crew were rescued by New York (United States). Invincible was on a voyage from Kristianstad, Sweden to Barcelona, Spain.
Margaret	United Kingdom	The schooner sprang a leak foundered in the Atlantic Ocean 25 nautical miles (46 km) off Cape Sable Island, Nova Scotia, British North America. Her crew were rescued. She was on a voyage from Pictou, Nova Scotia to Portland, Dorset.
Mary	United Kingdom	The ship ran aground and sank off Saaremaa, Russia. Her crew were rescued. She was on a voyage from South Shields, County Durham to Kronstadt, Russia.

== 29 July ==
List of shipwrecks: 29 July 1848
Ship	State	Description
John Christian	United Kingdom	The ship was sighted in the South Atlantic whilst on a voyage from Liverpool, Lancashire to Hong Kong. No further trace, presumed foundered with the loss of all hands.

== 30 July ==
List of shipwrecks: 30 July 1848
Ship	State	Description
Barbara	United Kingdom	The ship was struck by lightning and set afire in the Atlantic Ocean. The fire was extinguished with assistance from Rouble (Russia). Barbara was on a voyage from Kingston, Jamaica to Bristol, Gloucestershire.
Elizabeth Maria	United Kingdom	The sloop struck a rock in Jack's Sound and foundered in St. Bride's Bay. She was on a voyage from Aberayron, Cardiganshire to Pembrey, Carmarthenshire.
Hector	United Kingdom	The ship was driven ashore on the Half Moon Keys. She was on a voyage from Old Harbour, Jamaica to London. She was refloated on 2 August and put in to Kingston, Jamaica for repairs.
Malvina	(United Kingdom of Great Britain and Ireland) Jersey	The ship was wrecked in the São Francisco River. Her crew were rescued. She was on a voyage from Montevideo, Uruguay to Cork.
May	United Kingdom	The ship was driven ashore east of Gibraltar. She was on a voyage from Alexandria, Egypt to Liverpool, Lancashire. She was refloated the next day with assistance from HMS Polythemus (Royal Navy) and resumed her voyage.
Wave	United Kingdom	The ship was driven ashore 3 nautical miles (5.6 km) from Rutland, County Donegal. She was refloated but consequently sank. She was on a voyage from Westport, County Mayo to Liverpool.

== 31 July ==
List of shipwrecks: 31 July 1848
Ship	State	Description
Catherine	United Kingdom	The ship was in collision with the steamship Clarence (United Kingdom) and sank in the North Sea 10 nautical miles (19 km) off Lowestoft, Suffolk. Her crew were rescued.
Couriren	Sweden	The ship was abandoned in the Atlantic Ocean off Cape Finisterre, Spain. Her crew were rescued by Carl Johan (Sweden). Couriren was on a voyage from Cádiz, Spain to Gothenburg.
Eleanor and Betsey	United Kingdom	The ship was driven ashore at Skerries, County Dublin. She was refloated and taken in to Skerries.
Norden	Norway	The ship ran aground south east of Fugelhuken, Svalbard.

== Unknown date ==
List of shipwrecks: Unknown date in July 1848
Ship	State	Description
Affghan	United Kingdom	The ship was driven ashore on Jeremie Island, Province of Canada, British North America. She was on a voyage from Quebec City, Province of Canada to Greenock, Renfrewshire. She was refloated on 8 July and resumed her voyage.
Agnes	United Kingdom	The ship ran aground on the Filsand, off Saaremaa, Russia. She was on a voyage from Cardiff, Glamorgan to Saint Petersburg, Russia. She was refloated and completed her voyage, arriving at Saint Petersburg on 25 July.
Christine Dorothe	Denmark	The schooner capsized in the Baltic Sea. She was towed in to Landskrona, Sweden on 27 July.
Dungannon	United Kingdom	The ship was lost near St. Paul's, Nova Scotia, British North America.
Fawcett	United Kingdom	The ship was driven ashore in the Solway Firth. She was on a voyage from Quebec City, Province of Canada, British North America to Dumfries. She was refloated on 29 July and taken in to Dumfries.
Joshua Carroll	United Kingdom	The ship ran aground on the Filsand, off Saaremaa, Russia. she was later refloated and taken in to Kronstadt, Russia, where she arrived on 29 July.
Maria Ramiette	France	The ship was wrecked on the Longsand, in the North Sea off the coast of Essex, United Kingdom. She was on a voyage from Newcastle upon Tyne, Northumberland, United Kingdom to Brest, Finistère.
Mary and Louisa	United Kingdom	The ship was wrecked north of Bangka Island, Spanish East Indies on or about 20 July. She was on a voyage from Singapore to London.
Spring	United Kingdom	The ship was driven ashore on Saltholm, Denmark. She was on a voyage from Newcastle upon Tyne to Saint Petersburg. She was refloated and completed her voyage, arriving at Saint Petersburg on 26 July.
Swift	United Kingdom	The brig ran aground on the Gunfleet Sand, in the North Sea off the coast of Essex. She was on a voyage from South Shields, County Durham to London. She was refloated and assisted in to Harwich, Essex in a leaky condition.
Wilkinson	United Kingdom	The brig was lost near Saint John's, Newfoundland, British North America before 24 July. Her crew were rescued by the brig Française (France). Wilkinson was on a voyage from Liverpool to Saint John's.
Zetland	United Kingdom	The ship was driven ashore on Seal Island, Nova Scotia. She was on a voyage from Saint John, New Brunswick to Liverpool. She was refloated and put back to Saint John in a waterlogged condition.
