= Henry Marten (educator) =

British educator

Sir Henry Marten KCVO
- Born: Clarence Henry Kennett Marten; 28 October 1872; Kensington, London, England
- Died: 11 December 1948 (aged 76)
- Education: Eton College
- Alma mater: Balliol College, Oxford
- Known for: Provost of Eton (1945–1949)
- Relatives: Sir Alfred Marten (father)

Sir Clarence Henry Kennett Marten KCVO (28 October 1872 – 11 December 1948) was the Provost of Eton and the private tutor of Queen Elizabeth II.

== Biography ==
Henry Marten was born with his twin sister Isabel in Kensington, London. He was the younger son of Sir Alfred Marten and his wife Patricia and was the brother of Sir Alfred Barrington Marten, Chief Justice of the Bombay High Court from 1926 to 1930. Marten entered Eton College, and from there matriculated at Balliol College, Oxford in 1891. In 1895, he graduated with a first-class degree in modern history and accepted an offer from Edmond Warre to return to Eton to teach history.

He was a founder member of the Historical Association in 1906. In 1912, he published The Groundwork of British History with his co-author, George Townsend Warner, which became "one of the most used school textbooks of the first half of the twentieth century". With E. H. Carter, (Note: Edward Henry Carter (1876–1953) was chief inspector of schools in England. In 1931, he had an MA degree and was "late scholar of Jesus College, Cambridge".) he wrote a school textbook for younger children, in several volumes, titled simply "Histories". Other collaborative works included The Teaching of History in 1938.

In 1925, Marten narrowly missed becoming Master of Magdalene College, in Cambridge, when he was recommended to the hereditary Visitor of Magdalene, Lord Braybrooke as a possible candidate, but the College Fellows opposed the appointment, preferring another candidate, A. S. Ramsey. Braybrooke chose to appoint neither, and instead A. B. Ramsay, who was Lower Master (deputy head) at Eton, got the job. Marten was appointed to Ramsay's vacated post at Eton. Further promotions followed, to Vice-Provost in 1929, and Provost in 1945.

In 1938, Marten began instructing Princess Elizabeth (later Queen Elizabeth II) in constitutional history. He was appointed Knight Commander of the Royal Victorian Order in the 1945 New Year Honours, and received the accolade from King George VI on 4 March 1945, on the steps of Eton College Chapel.

He died unmarried in the Provost's Lodge at Eton, where the Marten Library is named after him. The library contains his collection of books, which he bequeathed to Eton on his death.

== Notes ==
Academic offices
Preceded by Lord Hugh Cecil	Provost of Eton College; 1945–1948	Succeeded by Claude Aurelius Elliott
