= Robert Uniacke-Penrose-Fitzgerald =

British politician

Sir Robert Uniacke-Penrose-Fitzgerald MP
- Uniacke-Penrose-Fitzgerald with his family

Member of Parliament for Cambridge
- In office 1885–1906
- Preceded by: William Fowler; Hugh Shield
- Succeeded by: Stanley Buckmaster

Personal details
- Born: 10 July 1839
- Died: 10 July 1919 (aged 80) Westminster, London, England
- Party: Conservative
- Spouse: Jane Emily Codrington (m. 1867)
- Relations: Geraldine Penrose Fitzgerald (sister)
- Education: Westminster School; Trinity Hall, Cambridge

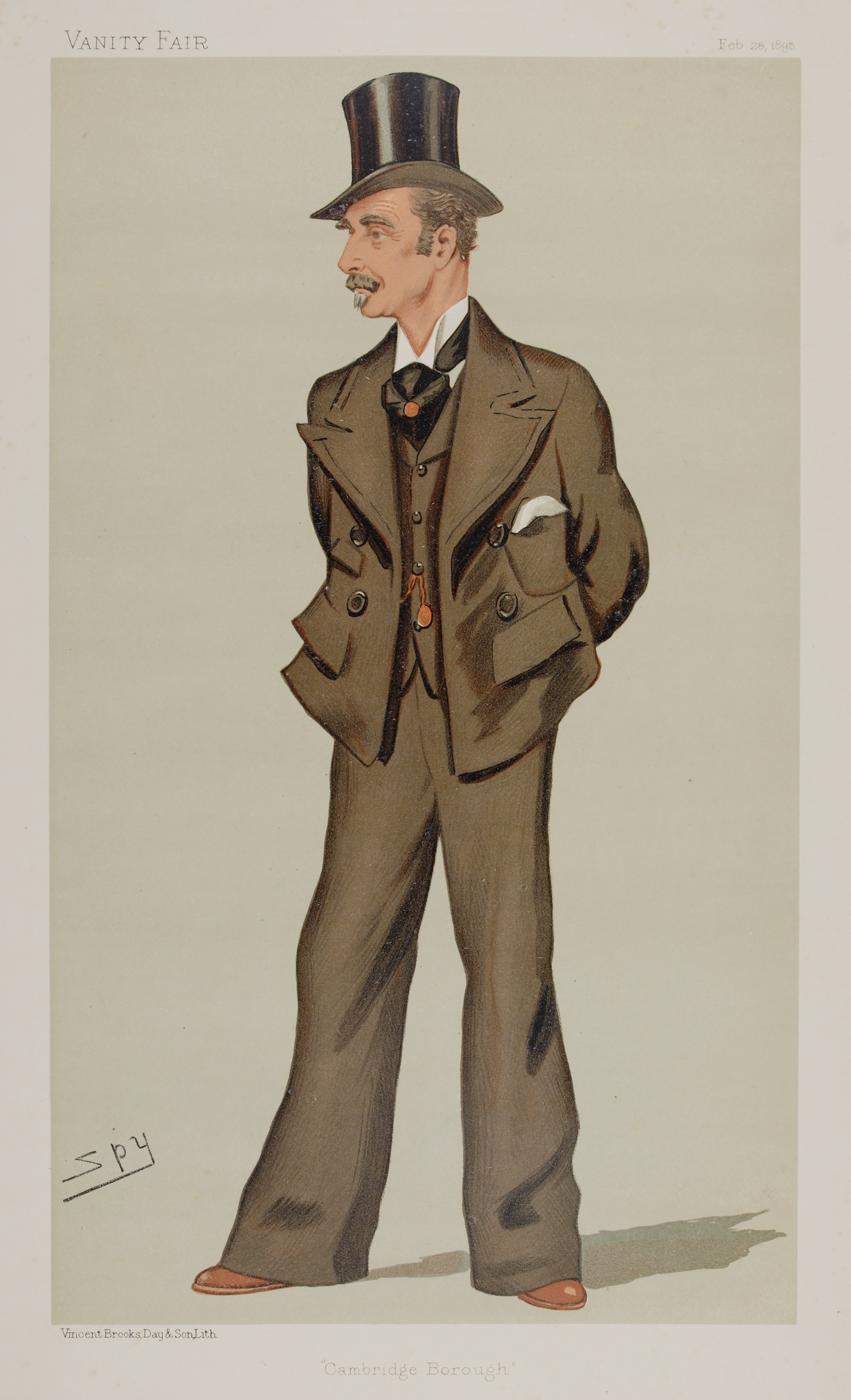
Mr Robert Uniacke Penrose-Fitzgerald MP for 'Cambridge Borough', as depicted by Spy (Leslie Ward) in Vanity Fair, February 1895

Sir Robert Uniacke-Penrose-Fitzgerald, 1st Baronet of Lisquinlan and Corkbeg (10 July 1839 – 10 July 1919), was a British Conservative politician.

== Early life ==
Fitzgerald was the son of Robert Uniacke Penrose (1800 – 11 June 1857) of Corkbeg House, County Cork. He was educated at Westminster School and Trinity Hall, Cambridge. His sister was the writer Geraldine Penrose Fitzgerald. He rowed at Cambridge and won the University Pairs with J. P. Ingham in 1860. He rowed in the Cambridge boat in the Boat Race in 1861 and 1862 when Oxford won in both years. After university he travelled in India and Tibet from 1863 to 1867.

== Political career ==
Fitzgerald was elected to the House of Commons for Cambridge in the 1885 general election, a seat he held until the 1906 election. In 1896, he adopted the name Uniacke-Penrose-Fitzgerald and on 4 August of that year was created a baronet, of Lisquinlan in the parish of Ightermurrough and of Corkbeg Island in the parish of Corkbeg, both in the County of Cork. He owned about 6,000 acres (2,428 ha) in County Cork and was director of the Property Defence Association and Cork Defence Union against Land League. He was also president of the Council of the Yacht Racing Association. and was appointed Honorary Colonel of the 9th (North Cork Militia) Battalion, King's Royal Rifle Corps on 3 March 1899.

== Personal life ==
Fitzgerald married Jane Emily Codrington, daughter of General Sir William Codrington, in 1867. They had no children.

Uniacke-Penrose-Fitzgerald died at Westminster in 1919 on his eightieth birthday, when the baronetcy became extinct. Lady Jane Uniacke-Penrose-Fitzgerald died in 1924.

== Arms ==
Coat of arms of Robert Uniacke-Penrose-Fitzgerald
Notes Granted 30 July 1896 by Arthur Edward Vicars, Ulster King of Arms. Crest On a wreath of the colours a knight in complete armour his sword drawn and wreath up all Proper mounted on a horse courant Argent the whole charged with a crescent as in the principle arms. Escutcheon Quarterly 1st & 4th Ermine on a saltire Gules a crescent Or (Fitzgerald) 2nd Argent six roses proper three and three between three bendlets Sable (Penrose) 3rd Argent a wolf passant Proper a chief Gules charged with a crescent of the field (Uniacke). Motto Fortis Et Fidelis

== Ancestry ==
Ancestors of Robert Uniacke-Penrose-Fitzgerald

16. John Penrose
8. Cooper Penrose
17. Ann Cooper
4. James Penrose
9. Elizabeth Denniss
2. Robert Uniacke-Penrose-FitzGerald
40. Thomas Uniacke
20. Robert Uniacke-FitzGerald
41. Helena Borr
10. Robert Uniacke Fitzgerald
21. Frances Lepp Judkin
5. Louisa Petitot Uniacke-FitzGerald
22. Richard Bullen
11. Louisa Pettitot Bullen
1. Robert Uniacke-Penrose-Fitzgerald
12. Robert Austen
6. Robert Austen
13. Elizabeth Ellis
3. Frances Matilda Austen
28. Charles Cokayne
14. William Cokayne
29. Sophia Baxter
7. Matilda Sophia Cockayne
30. George Hill
15. Barbara Cockayne-Medlycott nee Hill
31. Anne Barbara Hill-Medlycott (nee Medlycott)

== See also ==
- List of Cambridge University Boat Race crews

Parliament of the United Kingdom
Preceded by William Fowler; Hugh Shield	Member of Parliament for Cambridge; 1885–1906 (representation reduced to one member 1885)	Succeeded by Stanley Buckmaster
Baronetage of the United Kingdom
New creation	Baronet (of Corkbeg and Lisquinlan); 1906–1919	Extinct
Preceded by Verdin baronets	Uniacke-Penrose-Fitzgerald baronets of Corkbeg and Lisquinlan; 4 August 1896	Succeeded by Lees baronets
