= Hugh Shield =

Hugh Shield MP
- Shield in 1880

Member of Parliament for Cambridge
- In office 1880–1885 Serving with William Fowler
- Preceded by: Patrick Smollett
- Succeeded by: Robert Uniacke-Penrose-Fitzgerald

Personal details
- Born: 12 October 1831
- Died: 24 November 1903 (aged 72)
- Party: Liberal
- Education: Trinity College, Cambridge; Jesus College, Cambridge

Hugh Shield (12 October 1831 – 24 November 1903) was an English academic, barrister and Liberal Party politician who sat in the House of Commons from 1880 to 1885.

== Biography ==
Shield was the son of John Shield of Stotes Hall, Jesmond, Newcastle upon Tyne and his wife Catherine Barnett, daughter of R Barnett of Westmeath. He was educated at the Grange School, Bishopswearmouth and King Edward's School, Birmingham. He was admitted to Trinity College, Cambridge in 1850, but migrated to Jesus College, Cambridge. In 1857 he was awarded the Chancellor's Medal for legal studies and became a Fellow of the college and Senior Bursar. He was admitted at Gray's Inn in 1854 and was called to the bar on 26 January 1860. He went on the North-Eastern Circuit and became a Bencher of his Inn in 1880 and a Queen's Counsel in 1881.

At the 1880 general election Shield was elected one of the two Members of Parliament for Cambridge. He held the seat until 1885.

Shield died, unmarried at the age of 72.

Parliament of the United Kingdom
Preceded by Patrick Smollett; Alfred Marten	Member of Parliament for Cambridge; 1880 – 1885; With: William Fowler	Succeeded by Robert Uniacke-Penrose-Fitzgerald
