= Eustace B. Grundy =

English lawyer

Eustace Beardoe Grundy (30 December 1848 – 31 December 1938) was an English lawyer with a considerable career in Adelaide, South Australia.

== History ==
Grundy was born in Cheetham Hill, Manchester, the only son of Frederick Grundy Esq., an English attorney and solicitor. He studied law at Oxford University, and was admitted to the English Bar in 1873. In 1874 he left for South Australia, and was appointed Judge's Associate to Chief Justice, Sir R. D. Hanson by 1875.

After the death of Hanson he began practising in Mount Gambier.

From March to April 1878 he served as Acting Master of the Supreme Court during the leave of absence of William Hinde. James C. Russell was then appointed to the acting position. and succeeded to the substantive position on the death of Hinde on 11 September 1878.

In 1879 Rupert Ingleby & Grundy formed a partnership with offices at 96 King William Street, Adelaide; in 1880 Ingleby, Grundy & Nesbit with E. Pariss Nesbit; in 1883 admitted Rupert Pelly to form Grundy, Nesbit & Pelly; in 1884 Became Grundy & Pelly In 1907 they admitted solicitor (Charles) Burton Hardy into the partnership, styled Grundy, Pelly, & Burton Hardy.

Grundy 'took silk' as Queen's Counsel in 1900.

In 1919 he was elected president of the South Australian Law Society.

In February 1923 they returned to London by the SS Macedonia, living at Earl's Court, and died within a year of each other.

== Other interests ==
- He was active in the South Australian Literary Societies' Union and its president in 1904.
- From 1916 to 1919 he was grandmaster of the Grand Lodge of Freemasons.
- He was the first president of the Adelaide Park Lands Preservation League.
- He was the first president of the South Australian branch of the Navy League.
- He was a governor of the Wyatt Benevolent Institution.

== Family ==
Grundy married Sarah Elizabeth "Lisa" Hanson (23 February 1853 – c. 15 January 1930), eldest daughter of Sir R. D. Hanson, former Chief Justice of South Australia (died 4 March 1876), at St Johns Church, Adelaide, on 6 July 1876. They had a residence in St. Johns Street, off Halifax Street, home to a remarkable number of notable people. They had no children.
