= Arpenteur =

Brig wrecked at Hassell Beach in Western Australia in 1849

Coordinates: 34.8698°S 118.4037°E

History

United Kingdom
- Name: Arpenteur
- Owner: William Owen & John Ridley
- Launched: 1839
- Stricken: Sank 1849
- Fate: Wrecked 1849

General characteristics
- Class & type: Brig
- Tons burthen: 95 tons
- Length: 72.2 feet (22 m)
- Beam: 18 ft (5.5 m)
- Draught: 10.6 ft (3.2 m)

Arpenteur was a brig owned by William Owen and John Ridley. It was wrecked at Hassell Beach in Cheyne Bay near Cape Riche when a gale ran it ashore 7 November 1849.

== History ==
Arpenteur was built using wood at Mahe in the Seychelles in 1839. It was originally registered in Port Louis in Mauritius. The vessel was purchased in 1847 by Owen and Ridley, who had it re-registered at Port Adelaide. The vessel was used to transport cargo between Singapore, Java and Adelaide.

In 1848 Arpenteur, in the command of Captain Allen, was used to salvage Wave, which was wrecked at Cheynes Beach. The owners of the Arpenteur acquired the salvage rights for the wreck of the Wave for £330, equivalent to A$46,249 in 2022. When it returned to Fremantle Arpenteur had 27 long tons (27 t; 60,000 lb) of flour, 36 cubic metres (8,300 US dry gal) of wheat, the rigging and sails that the crew had salvaged from the wreck.

On its final voyage the brig was in the command of Captain John Raines and was being used to transport mail from England that had been collected at Singapore and was to be delivered at Fremantle. Unable to enter Fremantle harbour due to storms, it sailed on to Albany but was unable to enter King George Sound as a result of strong gales and was damaged in the process.

Eventually the ship reached Cheynes Beach where it was in the process of loading whale oil when strong gales rose from the south west blowing the vessel ashore so that it foundered and was wrecked. All of the crew escaped and a small portion of the cargo was salvaged.

== Wreck ==
The wreck is located approximately 100 metres (328 ft) offshore at the western end of Hassell Beach and lies on a flat sandy bottom. Used as a dive site, approximately 4.6 metres (15 ft) of planking and framework is visible along with some rounded stone ballast.

== See also ==
- List of places on the State Register of Heritage Places in the City of Albany
- List of shipwrecks of Australia § Western Australia
