= Patrick Smollett =

British politician

Patrick Boyle Smollett (1804 – 11 February 1895) was a British Conservative Party politician. He was a Member of Parliament (MP) for Dunbartonshire from 1859 to 1868, and for Cambridge from 1874 to 1880.

== Life ==
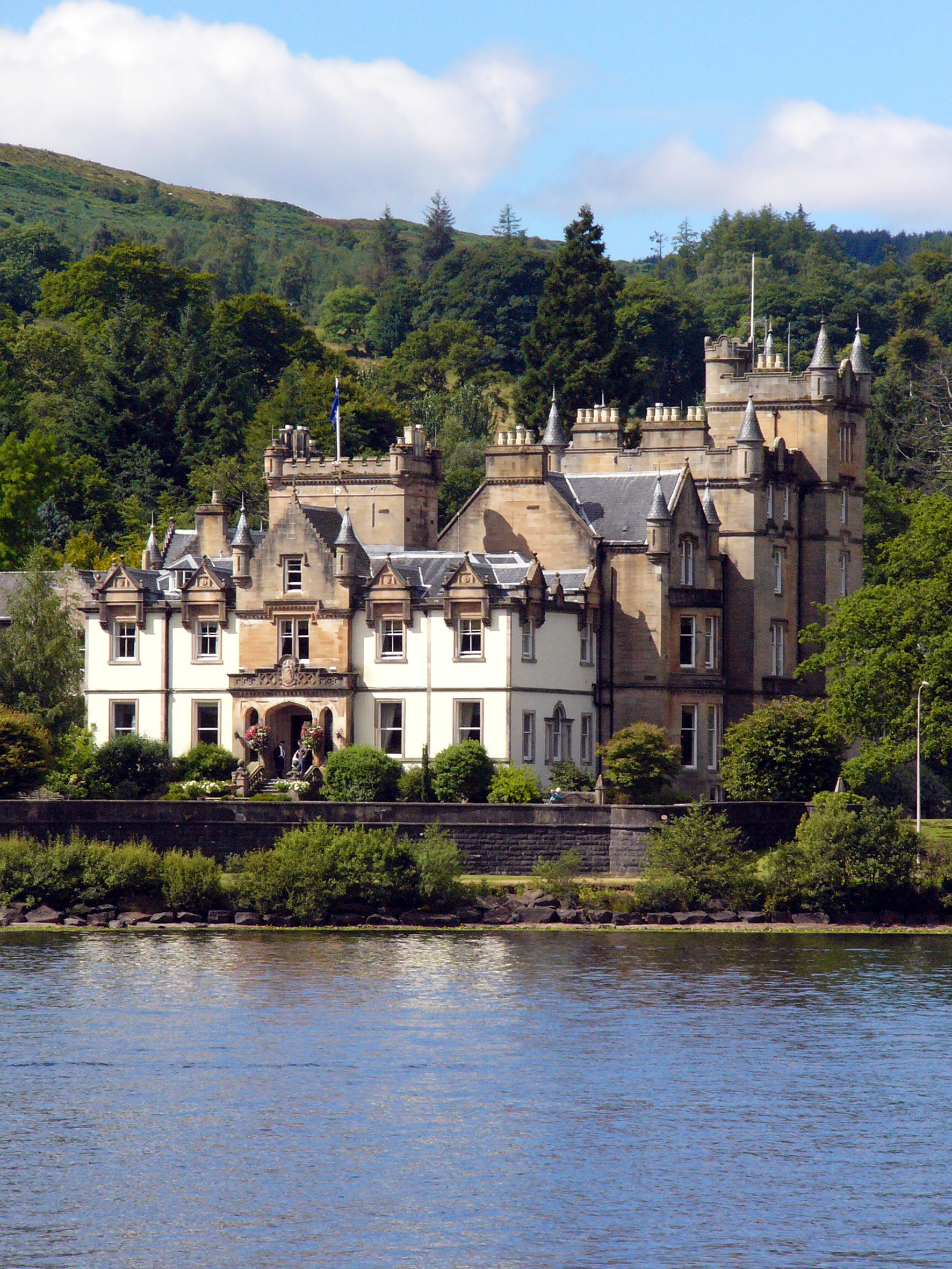
Cameron House, The Smollet's home on Loch Lomond

He was born at Cameron House, Bonhill in Dunbartonshire on 4 February 1804. He was the son of Admiral John Rouett Smollett (1767–1842) and Elizabeth Boyle, daughter of Patrick Boyle of Shewalton.

His father married in 1800 and had two sons (Alexander and Patrick Boyle) and four daughters. The eldest daughter Elizabeth (his sister) married Charles Villiers Stuart, younger brother of Lord Stuart of Decies. He was a member of the British East India Company (EIC) in Madras (now Chennai), India.

He retired from his Indian duties in 1858 and returned to Scotland to adopt his brother Alexander's former role as MP for Dumbarton. He paid for the building of St Mungo's Episcopalian Church in Alexandria, Dumbartonshire.

== Death ==
On his death, having no children his estate at Cameron House passed to Captain Buchan Telfer Smollet RN, a nephew.

His home, Cameron House, which lies on the west bank of Loch Lomond, is now a private hotel. His portrait hangs on its main stair.

== Publications ==
- Madras: Civil Administration; Being Rough Notes from Personal Observation Written in 1855 & 1856 (London: Richardson Brothers, 1858).

Parliament of the United Kingdom
Preceded by Alexander Smollett	Member of Parliament for Dunbartonshire; 1859 – 1868	Succeeded by Archibald Orr-Ewing
Preceded by Robert Torrens; William Fowler	Member of Parliament for Cambridge; 1874 – 1880; With: Alfred Marten	Succeeded by William Fowler; Hugh Shield
