= William Hanson (engineer) =

Australian civil engineer (1810–1875)

William Hanson MICE (1810 – 14 July 1875) was a government engineer in the early days of the colony of South Australia.

== Early days ==
Hanson was born in London, a son of Benjamin Hanson, fruit merchant and importer.

William was trained as an architect, and spent some time in a builder's office, then in 1836 began working for George Stephenson. He subsequently became manager of two English railways.

== Career in South Australia ==
He arrived in South Australia in late 1853. In February 1855 he was appointed engineer to the Adelaide and Gawler Railway Commissions, overseeing the construction of the line to Gawler and its extension to Kapunda (completed 1860), also to the Adelaide and Port Adelaide Railway. He was appointed chairman and engineer of the Railway Commission in 1857 and resigned early 1859, to be replaced by James Hill.

In October 1859, he was appointed engineer-in-chief of South Australian Railways, then in December 1860 he was appointed Engineer, Colonial Architect, and Inspector of Railways; and in June, 1865, he was made acting manager of Railways after the sacking of C. S. Hare, but retired in 1867 as his health deteriorated, and he lived with relatives at Walkerville and Parkin Street, Glenelg, which was where he died.

He was involved in the design and construction of the Thornden Park reservoir and its reticulation (piped network) to the city. He oversaw the completion of the Granite Island jetty. He recommended against building locks on the Port River and against selling the railways to a private company. He investigated the failure of the Torrens weir in 1859.

He became a member of the Adelaide Philosophical Society in 1865.

He was a director of the Provincial Gas Company of South Australia.

== Family ==
William was a brother of Sir Richard Davies Hanson, who was Premier of South Australia from 1857 to 1860, then Chief Justice. Other brothers were Joseph Laurence Hanson (ca.1808 – 23 July 1870), who was with the Railway Department, married with no children, and Edward Hanson (ca.1808 – 23 July 1870), an engineer with the Provincial Gas Company of Thebarton married to Catalina ( – 11 April 1877). He had three sisters: one married in England, another ( – 19 December 1890) married to Thomas S. Reed (22 May 1818 – 25 April 1914), chairman of the Destitute Board and secretary of the Geographical Society, and another unmarried.

He was married; they had a daughter.
