= Venezuelan Red Cross Society =

Organization

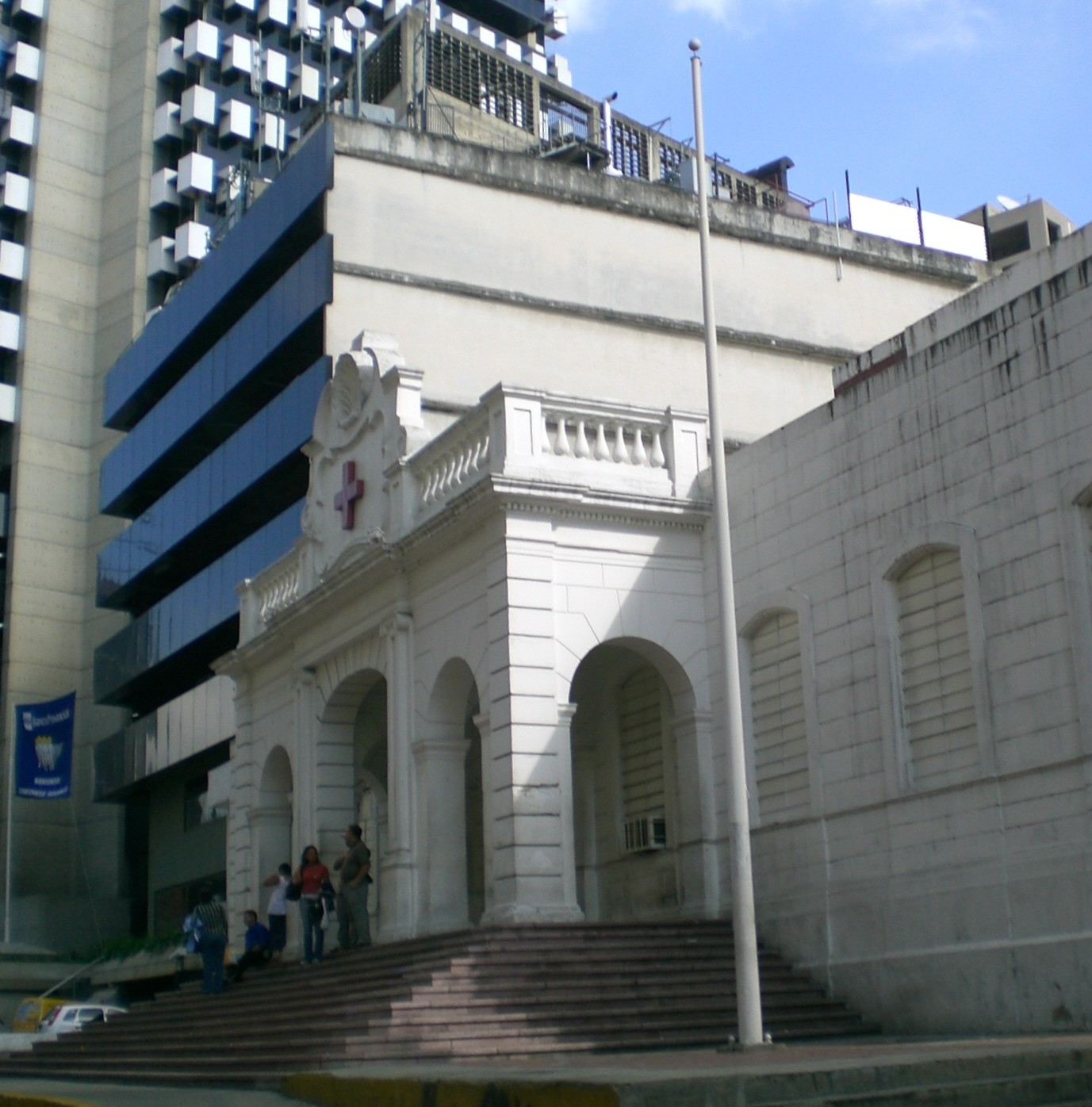
- Venezuelan Red Cross headquarters in Caracas
- Founded: January 30, 1895
- Type: Non-profit organisation
- Purpose: Humanitarian Aid
- Location: Venezuela
- Affiliations: International Committee of the Red Cross; International Federation of Red Cross and Red Crescent Societies
- Website: https://www.ifrc.org/national-societies-directory/venezuelan-red-cross

The Venezuela Red Cross Society (Spanish: Sociedad Venezolana de la Cruz Roja) was founded in 1895. Its first president was Briton Vincent Kennett-Barrington. It has its headquarters in Avenida Andrés Bello in Caracas.
