= Geraldine Penrose Fitzgerald =

Irish novelist and Catholic convert

- Born: 27 January 1846
- Died: 1 August 1939 (aged 93); Bournemouth, England
- Education: Somerville College, Oxford
- Relatives: Robert Uniacke-Penrose-Fitzgerald (brother)

Geraldine Penrose Fitzgerald (27 January 1846 – 1 August 1939) was an Irish novelist and Catholic convert.

== Early life and family ==
Geraldine Penrose Fitzgerald was born on 27 January 1846. She was also known as Fanny Louisa. Her parents were Robert Uniacke and Frances Matilda Penrose-Fitzgerald (née Austen). She was the youngest child, and had at least 3 brothers and a sister. The family had a London home at 19 Norfolk Square, near Paddington, and their family seat at Corkbeg House, County Cork. This house was situated on Cork Harbour, where the family enjoyed yachting and rowing. Her eldest brother was Sir Robert Uniacke-Penrose-Fitzgerald. Fitzgerald briefly studied at Somerville College, Oxford in 1881 and was arguably the first Catholic Oxford woman student.

As an adolescent, Fitzgerald started to develop Anglo-Catholic views such as going to confession, which was very unusual for Anglicans, to Edward Bouverie Pusey. Her family tried to dissuade her, but she was fascinated by John Henry Newman 's Apologia pro vita sua, which she purchased in secret. She visited the University Church in St Stephen's Green to pray, and wished to convert to Catholicism but hesitated in view of her family's opposition. She began to write to Newman in 1867 or 1868, and he commented on her striking "simplicity and frankness". Despite considerable opposition from family, she was received into the Catholic faith in May 1869. Newman continued to advise her, both in religious matters and later with her novels and in dealing with publishers. He addressed her in these letter as "My dear child". Newman visited with the Fitzgeralds in their London home while he was in the city on 22 February 1876, when he charmed her mother and sister. They later exchanged gifts with Newman, and congratulated him when he became cardinal in 1878.

== Writings ==
Fitzgerald wrote 5 or 6 novels, and possibly contributed to Catholic publications such as the Lamp as well. They attracted attention when they were published, but are not widely read since. Her first book, Ereighda Castle (1870), was published under the name Naseby. Her second novel, Only three weeks (1872), has a central character enter a friary and during this time Fitzgerald wrote to Newman that she had left her family to enter a convent herself. He advised her against any rash decisions, and disapproved of her leaving her mother so suddenly, so she returned to her family. Her third novel Was she tamed? (1875), appeared simply as by "the author of Only three weeks" and had some exploration of Home Rule in Ireland as imagined by Issac Butt. An 1882 manuscript she sent to Newman had a story which placed a character like Charles Stewart Parnell in a poor light, with Fitzgerald suspecting Parnell and his followers of instigating murders locally. Newman criticised these elements, and she subsequently removed them. She wrote of her pain and disappointment at the treatment of her family in the face of the Land League. The resulting book was her 1885 Oaks and birches. Newman's last surviving letters to Fitzgerald compliment her on the newly published novel.

As Newman's influence on Fitzgerald waned as he suffered with ill-health, this left her able to vent her hostilities in particular towards Home Rule and the Land League. Her last known novel, The silver whistle (1890), explores these themes in a thinly veiled allegory. There is little information on Fitzgerald's career after 1890. In her last book she appears to be in favour of women's suffrage, and later stated those views again in a June 1917 letter to the Cork Examiner. Fitzgerald moved to the south coast of England in the 1920s, staying there for the rest of her life. She was interviewed by the Irish Times in June 1934 after the canonisation of John Bosco, recounting her memories of meeting Bosco in 1884. A Cork journalist interviewed her about her family's memories of Sarah Curran in 1938, and she documented her conversion and contact with Newman in a long letter to Francis Browne excerpts of which were published with Newman's correspondence. Fitzgerald died on 1 August 1939 in Bournemouth.

== Writing ==
- Ereighda Castle (1870)
- Only three weeks (1872)
- Was she tamed? (1875)
- Oaks and birches (1885)
- Audrey Ferris (1889)
- The silver whistle (1890)
