= Members of the South Australian Legislative Council, 1857–1861 =

This is a list of members of the South Australian Legislative Council from 1857 to February 1861.

This was the first Legislative Council to be elected under the new Constitution, which provided for a house consisting of eighteen members to be elected from the whole State acting as one Electoral District; that six members, selected by lot, should be replaced at General Elections after four years, another six to be replaced four years later and thenceforth each member should have a term of twelve years.

Name	Time in office	Term expires	Previously represented / Notes
George Fife Angas	1851–	Feb. 1865	Barossa
Henry Ayers	1857–	Feb. 1869	
Charles Hervey Bagot	1851–1853; 1857–1861; 1865–1869	Feb. 1861	Light
John Baker	1851–1861; 1863–1872	Feb. 1861	Mount Barker
Samuel Davenport	1855–	Feb. 1873	Non-Official nominee
Charles Davies MD	1857–	Feb. 1865	
Charles G. Everard	1857–	Feb. 1869	
James Hurtle Fisher	1855–	Feb. 1865	Non-Official nominee
Anthony Forster	1855–	Feb. 1873	West Adelaide
Arthur Henry Freeling	1855–1859	Feb 1861	Official nominee (Surveyor-General). Resigned August 1859
Edward Castres Gwynne	1851–1855, 1857–1859	Feb. 1861	Non-Official nominee. Vacated seat August 1859 to take position of Supreme Court judge.
George Hall	1851–	Feb. 1869	Port Adelaide
John Morphett	1851–	Feb. 1865	Non-Official nominee
Thomas Shuldham O'Halloran	1857–1863	Feb. 1865	
Abraham Scott	1857–1867	Feb. 1873	
William Scott	1855–	Feb. 1869	Port Adelaide
Edward Stirling	1855–	Feb. 1865	Non-Official nominee
George Tinline	1860–1863	Feb. 1869	elected April 1860 to fill vacancy; seat declared vacant June 1863
George Waterhouse	1860–	Feb. 1869	elected April 1860 to fill vacancy
William Younghusband	1851–1861	Feb. 1861	Stanley
