= Vincent Kennett-Barrington =

British businessman and humanitarian (1844–1903)

Vincent Kennett-Barrington (3 September 1844 – 13 July 1903) was a British lawyer, businessman, humanitarian and politician.

== Life and work ==
Vincent Kennett-Barrington was born 3 September 1844 in Bagni di Lucca, Italy, to Vincent Frederick Kennett, a retired captain of the East India Company and member of the Order of Knights Hospitallers of St. John, and his wife Arabella Henrietta Barrington.

Educated in Eton and Cambridge, he was called to the bar association in 1872. He was involved in the British League of the Order of the Hospital of St. John of Jerusalem (the parent organization of St John's Ambulance) and the National Aid Society, the precursor to the Red Cross. He carried out humanitarian work in France during the Franco-Prussian War of 1870–1871. He later did similar work during the third Carlist war in Spain (1873–1875), the Ottoman-Serbian War (1876–1878) and the Russian-Turkish War (1877–1878).

He returned to the United Kingdom in 1878, where he married Alicia Georgette Sandeman.

In 1883 he was elected a member of the London Chamber of Commerce and Industry and, in 1889, became its vice president. He was named a knight in 1886. He was elected as a councilor in London County Council from 1890 to 1892.

In 1892 he arrived in Venezuela as a proxy of the La Guaira Harbour Corporation, an English company in charge of the construction of the port of La Guaira and the railway network. He promoted, through the presentation of a draft contract and statutes, the foundation of the Chamber of Commerce of Caracas (1893), together with Juan Esteban Linares, Henry Lord Boulton, Henrique Chaumer, César Müller and Casiano Santana, among others. The institution was officially installed in January 1894. He influenced, together with the German chargé d'affaires, Count de Kleist, for the Venezuelan government to be a signatory to the Geneva Convention of the Red Cross (1894) and founded the Venezuelan Society of the Red Cross that was inaugurated on 5 February 1895.

He died 13 July 1903 at his home in Dorchester on Thames, a few weeks after sustaining injuries in a hot-air ballooning accident.
