= William Henville Burford =

Australian politician and manufacturer (1807–1895)

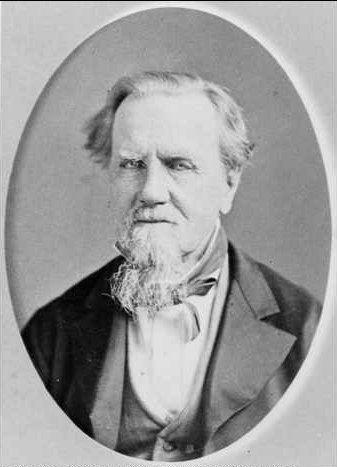
William Henville Burford – Soap Manufacturer. ca.1890

William Henville Burford (24 January 1807 – 23 October 1895) was an apprenticed butcher with some experience as a tallow merchant and chandler in Cannon Street, St George's East, in the East End of London. In 1838 he emigrated to South Australia for his health's sake with his wife and three daughters on the Pestonjee Bomanjee, arriving at Glenelg on 11 October. Initially he found work as a painter and glazier, and soon had one of the larger businesses in the Colony. In 1840, when a recession had made those trades unprofitable, he was able to start a soap and candle factory, W. H. Burford & Sons, in 134 (154?) Grenfell Street. The business failed several times, but revived with the opening of the Burra copper mine in 1848, then the Moonta and Wallaroo mines around 1863.

Burford was an alderman of the Adelaide Town Council for 1840 and 1841. During his second term he earned the nickname of "ninepenny dips" for his proposal to more than double the council rates to that figure (and "dip" being a form of candle), and was reviled for proposing other stringencies. He was not elected the following year and was vindicated when the Council collapsed, bankrupt.

Burford was elected to the South Australian House of Assembly for the seat of City of Adelaide in 1857. He was prominent in debates and a strong supporter of Robert Torrens' Real Property Act, but resigned in 1859.

Burford was a devout churchgoer, worshipping with the Independent Baptists, then Scotch Baptists and finally the Unley Church of Christ.

== Family of W. H. Burford ==
He married three times:

- Elizabeth Messent (c. 1814 – 14 July 1858) in May 1833

Children:

Elizabeth "Edith" Burford (c. 1832 – 28 January 1900)

m. Charles Bowen (c. 1834 – 5 September 1870) on 10 April 1857; their eldest son F. A. "Arthur" Bowen became manager of Burford & Sons.
m. Rev. R. K. Finlayson (27 April 1839 – 27 March 1917) on 19 August 1884 (his first wife, also Elizabeth, died 1880)

Ann Burford second daughter (c. 1837 – 1 April 1852)
Sarah Burford (died 1838 on voyage)
Gertrude Burford (c. 1841 – 18 August 1914) married Robert Eddy 10 September 1885
Benjamin Burford (c. 1843 – 18 May 1905) married Mary Jane Ware (died 24 July 1930) on 24 May 1866. He died, aged 65, from a self-inflicted gunshot after suffering head pains and deafness for seven years. He had only five years previously built a large house "Attunga" on 4.5 acres (1.8ha) at 120 Kensington Road, in what was then Rose Park.
William Burford (11 December 1845 – 6 March 1925) who oversaw the greatest development of the company

- Mary Ann Messent (c. 1815 – 22 September 1879), (sister of first wife Elizabeth Messent), on 31 October 1861
- Frances Sarah Ann Hawkes, née Symonds, the widow of John H. M. Hawkes (c. 1827 – 14 October 1858) in 1880.
