= Robert Richard Torrens =

Irish-born parliamentarian (1812–1884)

Lieutenant Colonel Robert Richard Torrens GCMG
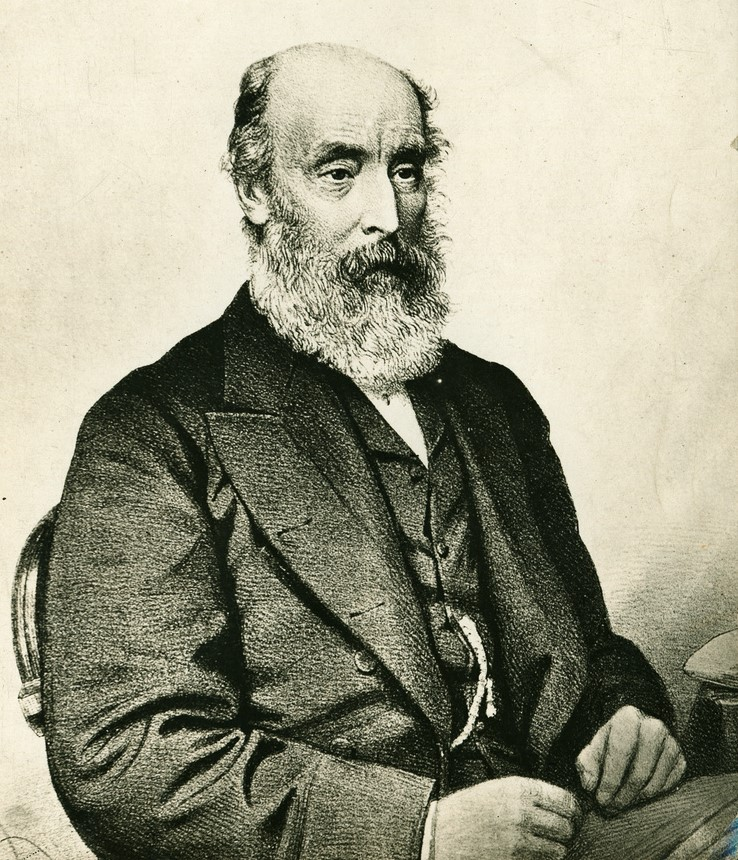
- Torrens in an 1880 illustration

Premier of South Australia
- In office 1 September 1857 – 30 September 1857
- Monarch: Victoria
- Governor: Richard Graves MacDonnell
- Preceded by: John Baker
- Succeeded by: Richard Hanson

Treasurer of South Australia
- In office 3 January 1852 – 21 August 1857
- Preceded by: B. T. Finniss
- Succeeded by: John Hart

Member of the House of Assembly for the City of Adelaide
- In office 3 March 1857 – 1 July 1858
- Preceded by: seat established
- Succeeded by: Judah Moss Solomon

Member of the South Australian Legislative Council
- In office 21 February 1851 – 2 February 1857
UK Politics
Member of Parliament for Cambridge
In office 10 December 1868 – 26 January 1874
Preceded by	John Eldon Gorst
Succeeded by	Alfred Marten

Personal details
- Born: 31 May 1812 Cork, Ireland, United Kingdom
- Died: 31 August 1884 (aged 72) Falmouth, Cornwall, England
- Party: Liberal
- Parent(s): Robert Torrens and Charity Herbert (née) Chute
- Education: Trinity College, Dublin

Sir Robert Richard Torrens, GCMG (31 May 1812 (Note: One early reference gave 1814 as his year of birth, which has been repeated ad nauseam. Modern historians have settled on 1812.) – 31 August 1884), also known as Robert Richard Chute Torrens, was an Irish-born parliamentarian, writer, and land reformer. After a move to London in 1836, he became prominent in the early years of the Colony of South Australia, emigrating after being appointed to a civil service position there in 1840. He was Colonial Treasurer and Registrar-General from 1852 to 1857 and then the third Premier of South Australia for a single month in September 1857.

Torrens is chiefly remembered as the originator of the Torrens title, a new system of land registration that subsequently spread to the other Australian colonies and is used in Australia and in many other countries throughout the world today. He secured its implementation in South Australia in 1858, and subsequently advocated for its adoption in other jurisdictions. Returning to England in 1865, he served in the British House of Commons from 1868 to 1874.

He was son of the political economist Robert Torrens, who was chairman of the London-based South Australian Colonisation Commission involved in setting up and encouraging emigration to the new colony.

== Early life ==
Torrens was born in Cork, Ireland, on 31 May 1812. He was the only surviving son of Robert Torrens FRS and his first wife Charity Herbert née Chute. His father had this marriage nullified and in 1819 married again, to Esther Serle, an English heiress, and had his three children rebaptised to give them a form of legitimacy, Robert Richard's birth year being reset to 1814.

Torrens was educated at Trinity College, Dublin, where he graduated BA 1835. His father had been appointed chairman of the London-based South Australian Colonization Commission, created in 1834 to oversee the new colony of South Australia, and the son moved to London in 1836 to work with his father and learn about customs collection by working as a landing waiter. Together they raised customs duties to finance the new colony, and promoted Irish investment and emigration.

In 1839, he married Barbara Anson, daughter of Alexander Park, widow of Augustus George Anson and a niece of explorer Mungo Park. In that same year he was awarded an MA "by grace".

== South Australia ==
In 1840, the couple left for South Australia, arriving on the Brightman in December 1840. In February 1841, Torrens was Collector of Customs at Adelaide, probably arranged by his father. He continued working as a customs official until 1852, obtaining a good working knowledge of the buying and selling of ships and shares in ships.

He gained a reputation for unorthodoxy in his official dealings; he squabbled with shipowners and was censured for various irregularities and for not supporting some of Governor George Grey's policies, but these did not prevent him from assuming other official roles, nor did his unorthodoxy stop when he was in higher office.

Torrens was given the title of Executive Councillor in 1855–57. He became Colonial Treasurer (Note: Or Treasurer of Customs, according to Debrett) (a post he held until 1862) and Registrar-General of Deeds, one of the best paid offices in Australia, in 1852.

When South Australia became self-governing colony in 1856 with the ratification of a new constitution by the British parliament via the Constitution Act 1856, Torrens became Treasurer of South Australia in the ministry of Finniss from 24 October 1856 to 21 August 1857, during which time he published drafts of his land reform bill.

He served in the voluntary colonial artillery for 11 years, retiring as Lieutenant-Colonel in 1865. Benjamin Solomon, began his military career in "A" Battery of Adelaide Field Artillery under Colonel Torrens.

Torrens initially opposed the system of voting by secret ballot, which was first adopted by South Australia in 1856–1857; however, after seeing the results, he stated the system was, "the best and most rapid and facile mode of carrying on elections".

== Real Property Act 1858 ==
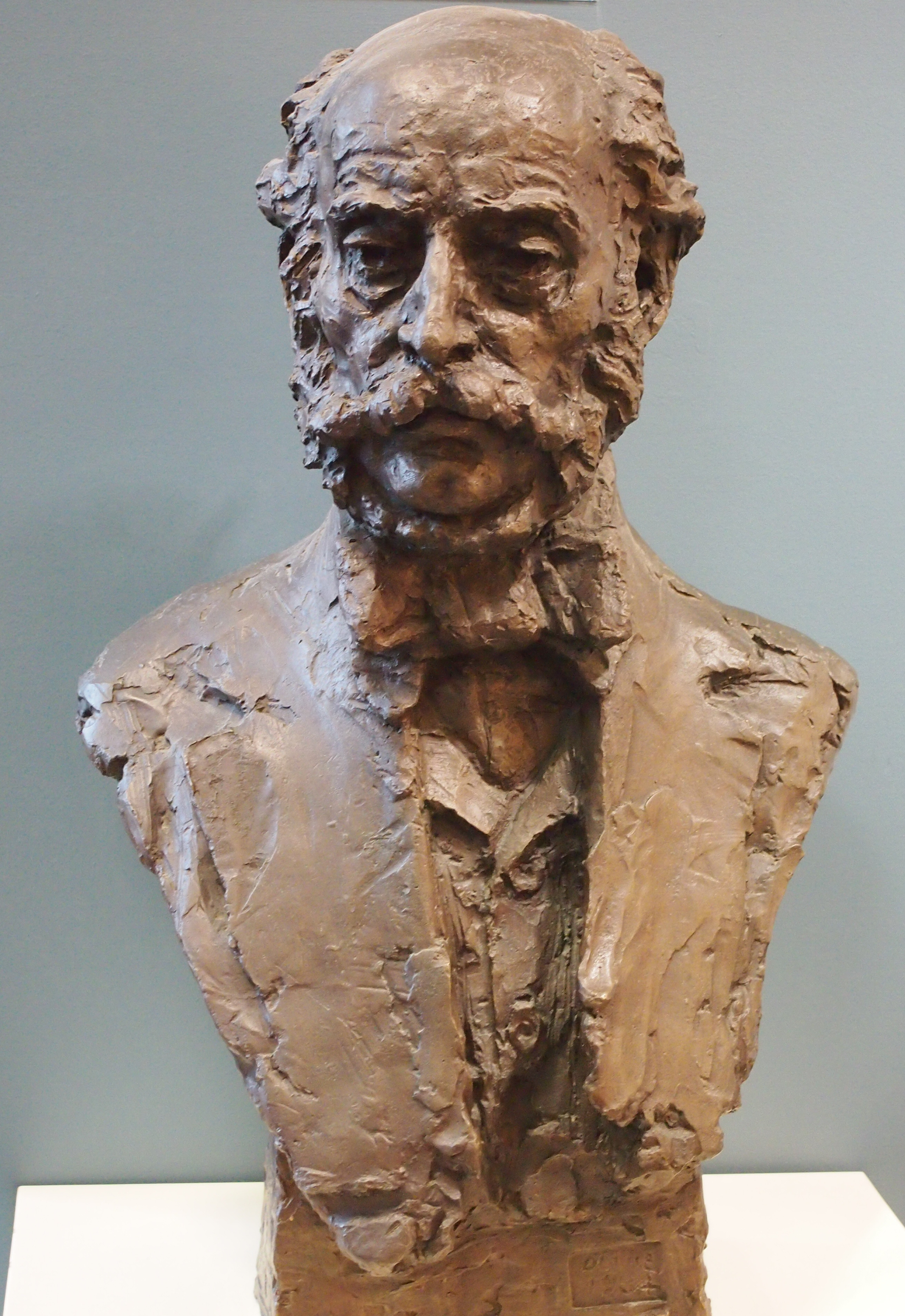
Bust of Robert Torrens by the sculptor John Dowie, formerly located in the Lands Titles Office, Adelaide, but now held in the South Australian Parliament Research Library

Torrens was elected as one of the members of the House of Assembly for the City of Adelaide in the new parliament in 1857, and on 1 September 1857 became Premier, although his government lasted only a month.

For years before his election, he had vigorously promoted the need for land titles reform, with the current system of transfer of land by deed ineffective, slow, expensive and insecure. It relied on verbose and complicated documents that had to be retained at least a century in order to validate new transactions and lawyers were needed to effect the transactions. The second reading of a bill introduced as a private member's bill was carried despite strong opposition, passing through both Houses on 27 January 1858.

The Real Property Act 1858, with the long title "An Act to simplify the Laws relating to the transfer and encumbrance of freehold and other interests in Land", was assented to on 27 January 1858.

The Act, eagerly anticipated by many, came into effect on 2 July 1858 and was on the whole well-received, apart from some lawyers who would have noted that the ease and clarity of the process would mean less in earnings for them in the future. Torrens resigned his seat in parliament and was appointed Registrar-General in order to assist with the Act's application, and in this role he did much to bring about a successful practical transition to the new system.

The Act radically altered the method of recording and registering land under freehold title. Instead, government certificates were issued and a central register established. The system transferred property by registration of title, instead of by deeds. This system provided an indisputable record, thus almost eliminating litigation involving land disputes, got rid of difficulties created by lost certificates, and reduced the cost of land sales and transfers. The legislation was refined in the following few years, which included an amendment allowing the licensing of registered land brokers instead of lawyers in land transactions, thus further reducing the cost.

=== Spread and current legislation ===
So successful was the outcome that it was adopted in the rest of Australia and in many countries throughout the world. The system became known as the Torrens title, and the Act sometimes referred to as the "Torrens Title Act 1858".

Torrens visited Victoria in 1860. He also helped the other colonies to introduce their own variations of the system: Queensland adopted the 1859 version, while New South Wales, Tasmania and Victoria based their legislation on the 1861 reforms. New Zealand, Malaysia and some states in the US followed; the system has since been widely adopted throughout the world.

In 1862, Torrens published A handy book on the Real Property Act of South Australia:..., which is now available in full online.

In South Australia, the Act was substantially revised in 1886, and Real Property Act 1886 (with various amendments) remains the basis of property law in South Australia.

=== Credit for the act ===
Some have challenged the notion that responsibility for the introduction of the successful system lies with Torrens, and it has been asserted that Anthony Forster, then editor of the South Australian Register, made the original suggestion. He also said that the idea was based on principles used in transferring shipping property, of which he would have gained experience in his early career as a customs official, both in London and Adelaide (1836–1852). His experience as Registrar-General (1852–1858), as a landowner himself, and the influence of politicians such as Forster and W. H. Burford and lawyers such as Richard Bullock Andrews, Henry Gawler and W. C. Belt, would have influenced him close to home.

Torrens was also familiar with a report presented to the British House of Commons on 15 May 1857, supplied by the Clare lawyer Ulrich Hübbe LLD, who had detailed knowledge of the real property laws of the Hanseatic League cities and whose doctorate in laws from Hamburg University dealt with this topic. His input added to the practical application of the method in law, and Torrens worked on this aspect further. With the support of Carl Muecke and the influential German community, he fought it through Parliament despite vigorous opposition from the legal profession.

There seems to be little doubt in the sources that the successful application of the new system in South Australia was largely the result of Torrens' preparation and attention to detail.

== Later life ==
In 1863, Torrens retired and, after a great series of celebration banquets, left Australia and settled back in England. There he gave lectures on and lobbied for the implementation of land title legislation, with a particular focus on Ireland.

He became the member of the House of Commons as a Liberal for Cambridge from 1868 to 1874, but did not have the opportunity to effect the land reform which was so dear to him.

He was created Knight Commander of the Order of St Michael and St George (KCMG) on 1 August 1872 and Knight Grand Cross of the Order of St Michael and St George (GCMG) on 24 May 1884, for his services "in connection with the Registration of Titles to Land Act". The Queensland, New South Wales, Victorian and Tasmanian Parliaments all gave him votes of thanks, but when in 1880 the attorney-general Sir William Bundey moved in the South Australian House of Assembly to grant Torrens a pension of £500, it was bitterly shouted down and the proposal had to be withdrawn, such was the animosity Torrens had aroused in some quarters.

His last place of residence was a house he built known as Hannaford House, in Ashburton, Devon, where he served as a county magistrate and as lieutenant-colonel of a volunteer artillery unit.

He died of pneumonia at Falmouth on 31 August 1884, aged 70, and was buried at Leusdon Churchyard. His wife, who died in 1899, was interred with him.

There is no record of children of his marriage.

== Legacy ==
Torrens' major legacy is the significant legal reform which became known as Torrens title, which can be said to be a world-first, born in Australia.

Places named after Torrens include:

- the Adelaide suburb Torrens Park, after the home he built and called "Torrens Park" near Mitcham in 1853–4. In 1865 Torrens sold the house to his partner in the Moonta Mines, Walter Watson Hughes, who enlarged it and later sold it to Robert Barr Smith. It is now part of Scotch College.
- Torrens Building on Victoria Square/Tarndanyangga, Adelaide
  - By extension, the now Australia-wide Torrens University, which started life in the Torrens Building
- the Electoral district of Torrens
- the Canberra suburb of Torrens, name proposed by "contemporaries of Sir Robert Torrens; SA pioneers and politicians" and gazetted on 20 September 1928; suburb gazetted on 12 May 1966.
- Torrens Terrace, a street in Wellington, New Zealand
- Torrens Creek, Queensland, named by the explorer William Landsborough, who discovered it in 1862 while searching for Burke and Wills.

(Note: Places named after his father, Robert Torrens, are the River Torrens, the suburb of Torrensville, Lake Torrens and Torrens Island.)

There is a portrait of Torrens in the Art Gallery of South Australia, and a drawing of him in the South Australian State Archives. There is a bust of him by the sculptor John Dowie, commissioned by the Land Brokers Society Incorporated "to commemorate the introduction of the world's first Torrens System of land titles in South Australia in 1858 and the creation of Land Brokers in 1860".

== Publications ==
Torrens authored these publications:

- The South Australian System of Conveyancing by Registration of Title (1859)
- Speeches by R. R. Torrens (1858)
- A Handy Book on the Real Property Act of South Australia (1862)
- Transportation Considered as a Punishment and as a Mode of Founding Colonies (or Transportation condemned as a deterrent punishment and as a means of founding colonies) (1863)
- An Essay on the Transfer of Land by Registration (1882)

And (dates not found):

- First effects of Gold discovery on the currency in the Australian Colonies
- Anomalies in the present relations between the mother country and her colonies

=== List of Worldcat holdings ===
There are other publications, documents and letters with Torrens as author, listed in WorldCat.

== Political offices and roles held in South Australia and the United Kingdom ==
Parliament of South Australia
Preceded by Thomas O'Halloran; Charles Sturt	Member of the South Australian Legislative Council; 1851–1857; Served alongside: Multiple Members	Succeeded by Henry Ayers; Charles Davies; Charles Everard; Thomas O'Halloran; Abraham Scott
New district	Member of Parliament for City of Adelaide; 1857–1858; Served alongside: Richard Hanson, Francis Dutton, Boyle Finniss, John Neales, William Burford	Succeeded by Judah Solomon
Political offices
Preceded by James MacDonald	Treasurer of South Australia; 1856–1857	Succeeded by John Hart
Preceded by John Baker	Premier of South Australia; 1857	Succeeded by Richard Hanson
Preceded by John Baker	Chief Secretary of South Australia; 1857	Succeeded by William Younghusband
Parliament of the United Kingdom
Preceded by John Eldon Gorst; Francis Powell	Member of Parliament for Cambridge; 1868–1874	Succeeded by Patrick Smollett; Alfred Marten
