= Wave (brig) =

1838 ship wrecked near Albany, Western Australia

Coordinates: 34.5945°S 118.7516°E

History

United Kingdom
- Name: Wave
- Launched: 1838
- Fate: Wrecked 5 July 1848

General characteristics
- Class & type: Brig
- Tons burthen: 103 tons

Wave was a brig that was wrecked in 1848 at Cheynes Beach near Cape Riche, Western Australia.

== Description and use ==
Built in 1838 in Victoria, Bermuda, the vessel was constructed from wood and copper sheathed. It had a square stern, single deck, no galleries and a billet head. The vessel was acquired by R. Brown in 1847 and was registered in London. It was then acquired in 1848 by William Younghusband and Company of Adelaide and registered there.

== 1848 wreck ==
The vessel was in command of James C. Coke and was transporting cargo from Adelaide to Shanghai via Albany and Singapore. The brig left Adelaide on 5 June 1848 loaded mostly with flour and was en route to Albany to load a shipment of sandalwood.

On 5 July 1848, the vessel was anchored at Cheyne Bay near Cape Riche when it was blown ashore by a heavy gale. Champion and Arpenteur were dispatched from King George Sound to assist. Champion managed to pull Wave offshore but Wave was leaking badly and foundered then sunk.

== Salvage ==
Champion then salvaged some of the cargo and then transported the crew, minus the captain, back to Albany. Captain Coke sailed to Adelaide aboard HMS Acheron, commanded by Captain John Lort Stokes.

The owners of Arpenteur acquired the wreck of Wave and that cargo not already salvaged for £330. Arpenteur sailed for Fremantle with 27 tons of flour, 1,000 bushels of wheat, the rigging and sails that the crew had salvaged from Wave.

== See also ==
- List of shipwrecks of Australia § Western Australia
