= Corkbeg House =

Historic house in County Cork, Ireland

- Location within Ireland

General information
- Location: Corkbeg, Midleton, County Cork; Ireland
- Coordinates: 51°49′38″N 8°14′58″W

Corkbeg House was a historic house built on the island of Corkbeg in Cork Harbour. It was demolished to facilitate the creation of the Whitegate oil refinery.

== House ==
The land where Corkbeg House was built originally belonged to the Condons. The remains of the castle they built in 1369 lie near the location of the house. The area of Corkbeg was tied very closely to the Fitzgeralds who been there since John FitzEdmond de Gerald purchased it from William Condon in 1591.

The original house on the site was built before 1786. Robert Uniacke Fitzgerald replaced it with a mansion house in the 1820s. The house itself was a three-bay, two-storey square house with a ‘very impressive central top-lit staircase hall’.

The Fitzgerald family sold it, after Robert Uniacke-Penrose-Fitzgerald died in 1919, though Lady Fitzgerald was still living in the house in 1921. It was turned into a fifty-roomed luxury hotel. The hotel was run by Major Patrick William Coghlan and Molly Colan. They sold the house and island in 1955. Molly died in the November 1957 Aquila Airways Solent crash in the Isle of Wight.

The whole site was cleared to allow the building of an oil refinery at Whitegate.

The hotel advertising claimed:

Corkbeg Island Hotel, bracing sea-bound golf links, semi-tropical gardens, fires in bedrooms, no extra charge, all-electric, first-class cuisine
Ireland’s Riviera, all-in holiday resort boating, bathing, tennis, riding, fishing, dances every Wednesday and Sunday

== See also ==
- List of historic houses in the Republic of Ireland
