= William Owen (Australian politician) =

Australian politician

William Owen (c. 1815 – 16 Oct 1869) was a businessman and politician in the young Colony of South Australia. He was a founder of the South Australian Total Abstinence Society.

== History ==
William Owen and his wife Christina (née Cock) emigrated to South Australia from London in 1838 on the Rajasthan arriving on 16 November 1838. Sometimes referred to as "Captain Owen", he was in business as a produce merchant in Rosina Street and then, from 1847, Pirie Street Adelaide. He spent a year in the Swan River Colony, at least partly in the hope that a "change of air" would be beneficial to his wife, who was suffering from tuberculosis. During this time he built up business contacts and exported goods and timber to his Adelaide store, which was being managed by J. J. Warner. In conjunction with A. L. Elder, chartered the 94 ton brigantine Emma Sherratt for a sugar buying expedition, a consequence of which was a libel suit by Owen against competitor William Younghusband. Owen won the case but was awarded only £20 damages. The Emma Sherratt a half share of which Owen purchased from Sherratt, was the subject of further disputes, and was lost near Samoa in December 1850. Another of Owen's ships, the 140 ton brig Arpenteur, was wrecked in 1849 with a huge loss of cargo, but without loss of life in either case.

He was, from his earliest days in South Australia, a prominent activist in the cause of Total abstinence, a Rechabite and founder of the South Australian Total Abstinence Society, serving as President or Vice-president for many years. He left the colony with his family in 1855 for England and America They returned in February 1858, but Mr. Owen did not resume his old business, but made several trips to the Fiji Islands, following which he made a series of public lectures.

He was elected on a platform of Free Trade and Free Immigration for the seat of City of Adelaide in the South Australian House of Assembly to fill the vacancy left by the resignation of William Henville Burford, and served from May 1859 to March 1860, when he announced his intention not to contest that or any other seat in the next election. He was however nominated for the seat of Port Adelaide, and without any effort or expense on his part was returned at the head of the poll, and served from March 1860 to March 1862, roughly contemporary with fellow abstainer G. W. Cole.

Sometime in the late 1850s, Owen purchased the island of Kioa from the local Chief; a deed signed by him, and another signed by his son were lodged with the British Consul for Fiji. The Fiji Pastoral, Agricultural and Commercial Company, provisional manager David Wilkinson (c. 1832 – 8 January 1910), was formed to exploit the country's largely untapped natural resources of timber, arrowroot, cotton, coconut, tobacco and so on. It was envisaged that the natives would be pleased to act as virtual slaves for the owners. (When Fiji became a British colony, Wilkinson, who had a strong command of the language, was appointed Chief Interpreter for the government, later Commissioner of Native Lands.) The company did not receive enthusiastic public support and appears to have quietly folded. Owen was appointed by Sir John Young as British Consul for the Fiji Islands, and was later commended by Earl Russell for the manner in which he performed the duties of his office. He died in Melbourne, Victoria during an extended visit to that State.

== Family ==
He was married to Christina, née Cock ( – 4 May 1848), (sister of Robert Cock). Three daughters were born in Adelaide, South Australia:

- Jane (22 April 1838 – 21 February 1907) married Rev. William Mansley Bennett (1834 – 29 June 1916). They had five children: Millicent Mary, William Owen, Beverley Mansley, Lina Ashley and Evan Owen.
- Catherine (known as Catherine Christina) (4 April 1841 – 22 October 1905) married Rev. Peter Roe Clarke Ussher (26 March 1834 – 23 March 1899) on 1 March 1862
- Christina (29 February 1848 – )

He married again, on 11 October 1850, to Isabella Sanders (c. 1803 – 30 March 1870). She had two daughters with James Sanders: Christiana or Christina Blackwood Sanders (c. 1844 – 20 August 1920), who married James Miller Anderson on 12 February 1862, and Emma Eliza Sanders. Her last residence was Jeffcott Street, North Adelaide.

They had a home in Kent Town, South Australia. His last residence was 1 Elgin Street, Carlton, Victoria where he died.
