= Richard Hanson (Australian politician) =

Australian politician

The Honourable Sir Richard Hanson
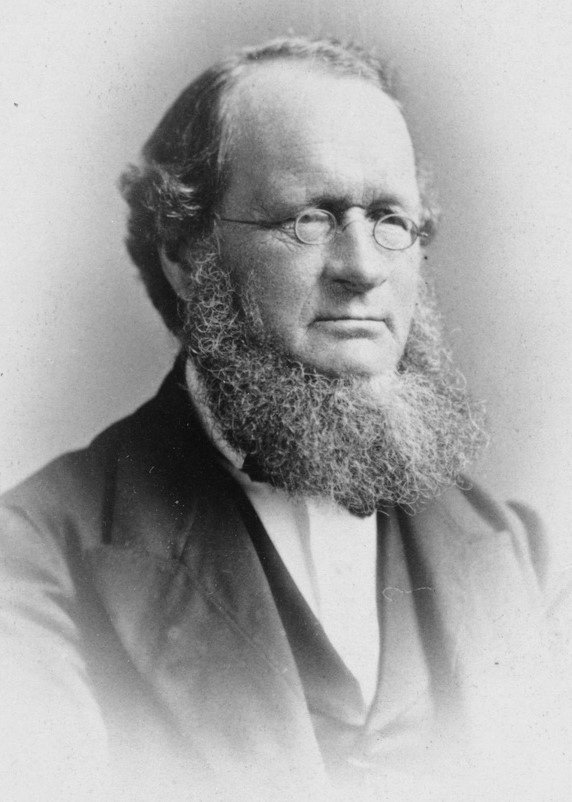

Chief Justice of South Australia
- In office 20 November 1861 – 4 March 1876
- Preceded by: Sir Charles Cooper
- Succeeded by: Samuel Way

Premier of South Australia
- In office 30 September 1857 – 9 May 1860
- Monarch: Victoria
- Governor: Sir Richard MacDonnell
- Preceded by: Robert Torrens
- Succeeded by: Thomas Reynolds

Chancellor of the University of Adelaide
- In office 6 November 1874 – 4 March 1876
- Preceded by: office established
- Succeeded by: Augustus Short

Attorney-General of South Australia
- In office 30 September 1857 – 9 May 1860
- Premier: himself
- Preceded by: Richard Bullock Andrews
- Succeeded by: Henry Strangways
- In office 17 July 1851 – 21 August 1857
- Preceded by: Charles Mann
- Succeeded by: Edward Castres Gwynne

Member of the Parliament of South Australia
- In office 21 February 1851 – 20 November 1861
- Constituency: Legislative Council (1851–1857); City of Adelaide (1857–1861)

Personal details
- Born: Richard Davies Hanson; 6 December 1805 London, England
- Died: 4 March 1876 (aged 70) Mount Lofty, South Australia
- Spouse: Ann Hopgood

Sir Richard Davies Hanson (6 December 1805 – 4 March 1876), was an Australian attorney, politician, judge, and academic administrator. He was the fourth premier of South Australia and a member of the Parliament of South Australia. He was a chief judge on the Supreme Court of South Australia and the Attorney-General of South Australia. Hanson was also the chancellor of the University o Adelaide.

== Life ==
Hanson was born in London, the second son of Benjamin Hanson, a fruit merchant and importer, and was educated at a private school in Melbourn, Cambridgeshire. Admitted a solicitor in 1828, he practised briefly in London, becoming a disciple of Edward Gibbon Wakefield in connection with his colonization schemes. Hanson joined The Globe as a political critic early in 1837. In 1838 he went with Lord Durham to Canada as assistant commissioner of inquiry into crown lands and immigration. Hanson worked with Dominick Daly in Canada.

In January 1840, on the death of Lord Durham, Hanson settled in Wellington, New Zealand, as Land Purchase Officer for the New Zealand Company. He was active in purchasing land in various parts of New Zealand. He also purchased the Chatham Islands in 1840, which was not part of New Zealand at the time. He then became the first crown prosecutor in Wellington. He moved to the colony of South Australia in 1846 and immediately set up a legal practice. He served as Advocate-General and Attorney-General for the colony before election to the seat of City of Adelaide in 1857.

In 1851 Hanson was appointed advocate-general of the colony, initially as a temporary replacement for the ailing William Smillie, made permanent when Smillie died. He took an active share in the passing of many important measures, such as the first Education Act, the District Councils Act of 1852, and the Act of 1856 which granted constitutional government to the colony. In 1856 he was attorney-general in the first ministry under Boyle Travers Finniss; becoming premier himself in 1857.

After leaving parliament, Hanson replaced Sir Charles Cooper as Chief Justice of the Supreme Court of South Australia in 1861. He was knighted in 1869 by Queen Victoria when he visited England, and was acting Governor of South Australia for 1872–73. In his spare time Hanson gave much time to theological studies. His publications include Law in Nature and Other Papers (1865), The Jesus of History (1869), Letters to and from Rome (1869), The Apostle Paul, and the Preaching of Christianity in the Primitive Church (1875).

He was elected the first Chancellor of the University of Adelaide; the first vice-chancellor was Augustus Short.

He died in Australia on 4 March 1876.

== Personal life ==
Freemasonry was an integral part of Hanson's personal life. He was elected as a member and initiated into the Craft on 27 November 1834 in London when The Lodge of Friendship, a Lodge especially founded to become South Australia's first Lodge, held its very first meeting. Later he was to rise in position within the Lodge, which still exists to the present day, and ultimately served as its Master.

His summer residence, Woodhouse, near Piccadilly, South Australia, is today owned by the South Australian Scout Association, and used for Scout leader training and private functions and accommodation; the extensive grounds are used for camping and outdoor adventuring.

Richard's brother William Hanson (1810–1875) was an architect and engineer who played a decisive role in the early history of South Australia's railways and waterworks.

== Family ==
Hanson married the widow Ann "Annie" Scanlon (perhaps Scanton), née Hopgood (died 1895) at his home, Sturt Street, Adelaide, on 29 March 1851. Their eldest daughter Sarah Elizabeth "Lisa" Hanson (23 February 1853 – c. 15 January 1930) married barrister Eustace Beardoe Grundy QC at St Johns Church, Adelaide, on 6 July 1876.

== Legacy ==
The following places in South Australia were named after him:

- Hanson Street in Adelaide named in 1837 and which was later subsumed by the expanded Pulteney Street in 1967.
- The cadastral unit of the Hundred of Hanson created in 1860.
- The cadastral unit of the County of Hanson created in 1877.
- The town of Hanson which was named in 1940
- The seat of Hanson in the South Australian House of Assembly which was created in 1970 and renamed to Ashford in 2002.

== See also ==
- Judiciary of Australia

== Notes ==
Political offices
New title	Attorney-General of South Australia; 1856 – 1857	Succeeded by Edward Gwynne
Preceded by Richard Andrews	Attorney-General of South Australia; 1857 – 1860	Succeeded by Henry Strangways
Preceded by Robert Torrens	Premier of South Australia; 1857–1860	Succeeded by Thomas Reynolds
Parliament of South Australia
New district	Member for City of Adelaide; 1857–1861; Served alongside: Robert Torrens, Judah Solomon, Francis Dutton, Boyle Finniss, John Neales, William Burford, William Owen, Matthew Moorhouse, Philip Santo, Samuel Bakewell, William Parkin	Succeeded by James Boucaut
Legal offices
Preceded by Charles Cooper	Chief Justice of the Supreme Court of South Australia; 20 November 1861 – 4 March 1876	Succeeded by Samuel Way
Government offices
Preceded by James Harwood Rocke	Administrator of South Australia; 1872–1873	Succeeded by William Wellington Cairns
-
Academic offices
New title	Chancellor of the University of Adelaide; 1874–1876	Succeeded by
