= Richard Bullock Andrews =

Australian politician and judge (11 May 1823 - 26 June 1884)

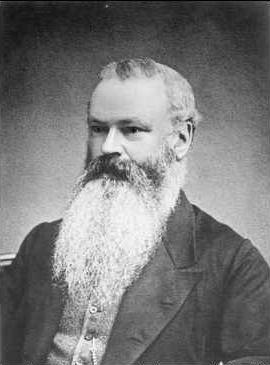
Richard Bullock Andrews

Richard Bullock Andrews (11 May 1823 – 26 June 1884) was an Australian politician and judge.

== Early life ==
Richard Bullock Andrews was born in Epping, Essex, England the eldest child of Richard Bullock Andrews, an attorney, and his wife Emma Ann. From December 1839 Bullock worked in his father's solicitors business. On 15 August 1846 he married Elizabeth Holtaway (29 August 1818 – 15 February 1906), daughter of a solicitor.

Andrews emigrated to South Australia, arriving there 14 December 1852 aboard the steamship Sydney. In 1853 he was appointed a notary public, on 3 May 1853 he was admitted to practice in the Supreme Court of South Australia. He practised in the Local Court at Mount Barker, South Australia and then set up an office in Adelaide.

He died on 26 June 1884.

== Legacy ==
The Hundred of Andrews, proclaimed in 1864, an agricultural district straddling the Hill River near Spalding, was named after him.

== Family ==
Andrews had a younger brother, William Buckton Andrews, who followed him to Adelaide in 1854, and as Canon Andrews became a celebrated and much loved leader of the Anglican Church, and whose daughter Alice Margaret married another son of William Giles.

== Citations ==
South Australian House of Assembly
Preceded by Charles Hare	Member for Yatala; 1857–1860; Served alongside: John Harvey, Lavington Glyde	Succeeded by Edward McEllister
Preceded by John Hallett	Member for The Sturt; 1862–1870; Served alongside: Joseph Peacock, Alexander Murray, Joseph Fisher	Succeeded by Frederick Spicer
Political offices
Preceded by Edward Gwynne	Attorney-General of South Australia; 1 Sep 1857 – 30 Sep 1857	Succeeded by Richard Hanson
Preceded by Randolph Stow	Attorney-General of South Australia; 4 Jul 1863 – 22 Jul 1864	Succeeded by Randolph Stow
Preceded by Randolph Stow	Attorney-General of South Australia; 22 Mar 1865 – 23 Oct 1865	Succeeded by James Boucaut
Preceded by James Boucaut	Attorney-General of South Australia; 3 May 1867 – 24 Sep 1868	Succeeded by John Bagot
Preceded by John Bagot	Attorney-General of South Australia; 13 Oct 1868 – 3 Nov 1868	Succeeded by Henry Strangways
