= Edward Castres Gwynne =

Australian politician

The Honourable Edward Gwynne
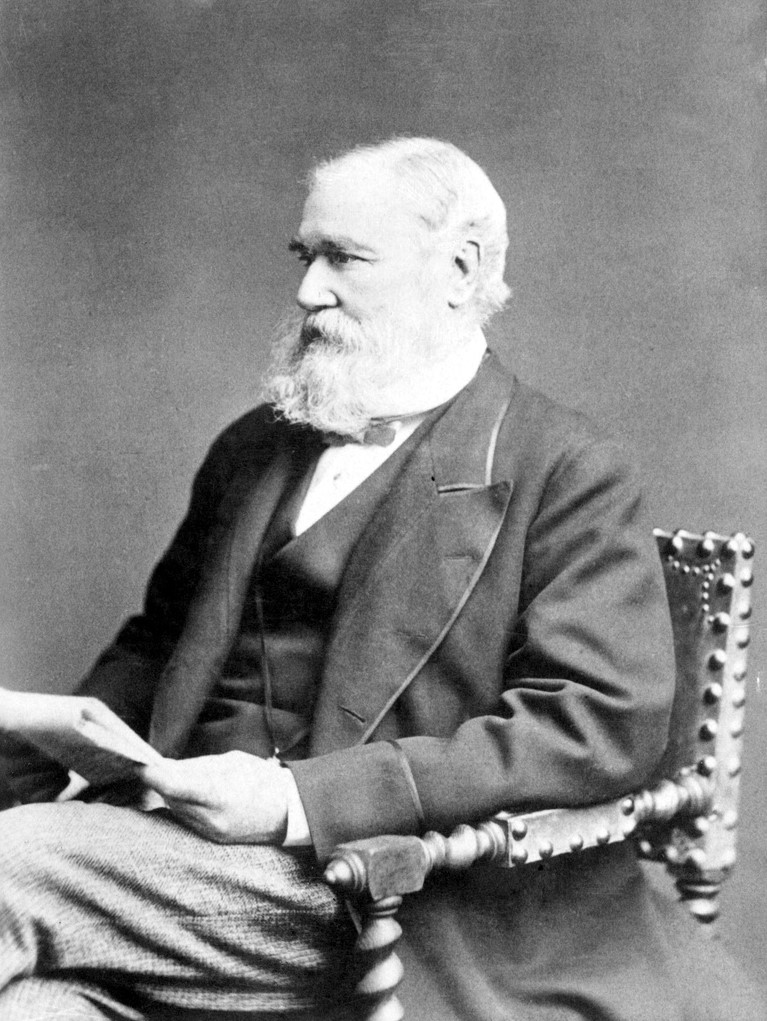

Judge of the Supreme Court of South Australia
- In office 26 February 1859 – 28 February 1881
- Succeeded by: Richard Andrews

Attorney-General of South Australia
- In office 21 August 1857 – 1 September 1857
- Premier: John Baker
- Preceded by: Sir Richard Hanson
- Succeeded by: Richard Andrews

Member of the Legislative Council of South Australia
- In office 9 March 1857 – 30 August 1859
- In office 21 February 1851 – 24 October 1855

Personal details
- Born: 13 February 1811 Lewes, Sussex, England
- Died: 10 June 1888 (aged 77) Glynde, South Australia
- Occupation: lawyer, politician, judge

Edward Castres Gwynne (13 February 1811 – 10 June 1888) was an English-born Australian lawyer, Supreme Court of South Australia judge and politician.

== Early life ==
Gwynne was born at Lewes, Sussex, England.

== Career in Australia ==
At the end of 1837 Gwynne was appointed clerk of court by the Supreme Court of South Australia judge John Jeffcott. Gwynne left for South Australia, arriving in Adelaide aboard the Lord Goderich on 15 April 1838. His appointment as clerk of court was not confirmed.

== Late life and legacy ==
Gwynne died on 10 June 1888. Mount Gwynne in the Northern Territory was named after Gwynne by John McDouall Stuart in 1860.

== Family ==
He married Marian (a daughter of Richard Eales Borrow) who survived him with four sons and four daughters.

His nephew Aubrey Percival Gwynne was a member of the Elder Scientific Exploring Expedition of 1891-1892.

Political offices
Preceded by Richard Hanson	Attorney-General of South Australia; 21 Aug 1857 – 1 Sep 1857	Succeeded by Richard Andrews
