= Charles Davies (South Australian politician) =

Australian politician (1813 – 1888)

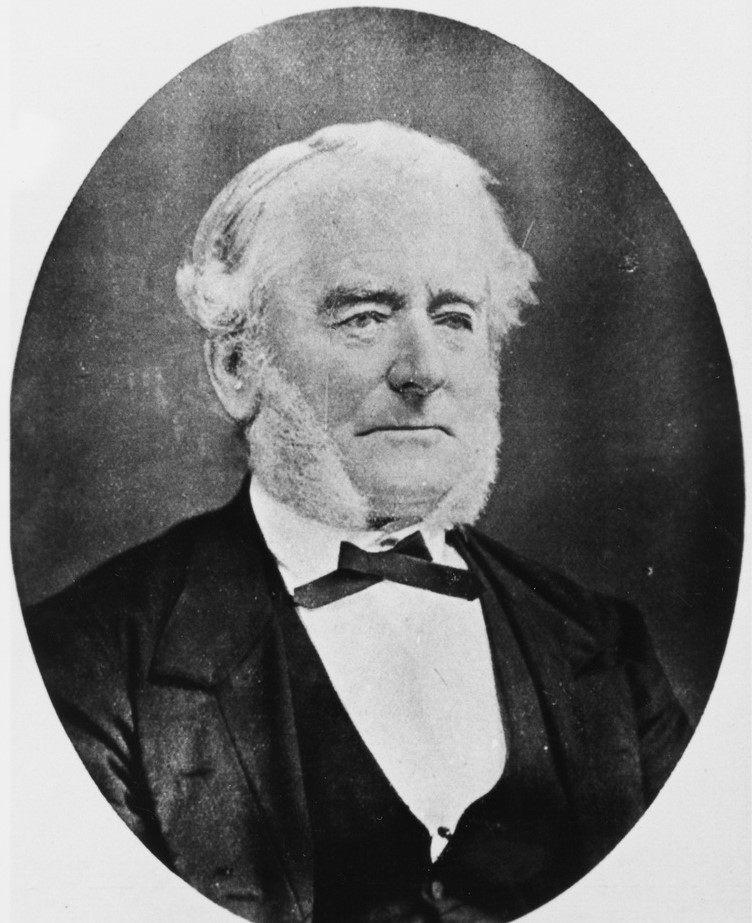

Charles Davies MD (20 Sept 1813 – 12 Feb 1888) was a member of the South Australian Legislative Council.

== History ==
Dr. Charles Davies, J.P., was born in London, possibly of Welsh stock, although his father had also been born in London He was the son of Joseph Davies, sexton of the parish and accountant of St Anne Soho and his wife Sophia née Loriot, whose father was French, from Caen in Normandy. Joseph Davies' father, also Joseph, had been the sexton of St Anne Soho as well. Charles Davies was educated in France, becoming an excellent French scholar. He emigrated to South Australia arriving in February 1840 aboard Branken Moor with his new wife and for several years lived in Kermode-street, North Adelaide, at the King William Road corner, where he built up a large and lucrative medical practice. He became a member of the first fully elected Legislative Council in 1857 and served until 2 February 1865, when he retired by rotation, as provided for in the 1857 Act. In 1859 he was appointed one of the Visitors to the Lunatic Asylum, was on the boards of the Adelaide Hospital and the Botanic Garden, and held other public positions. He was an enthusiastic naturalist with his own private museum. He was a chess enthusiast had strong literary tastes, and contributed regularly to the South Australian Register. Around 1864 he relinquished medical practice for sheep farming, and bought the Mattawarangula (also spelled Mattawarangala, Mattawaralunga, Mattlawarangalla) Run in the Far North of South Australia, which he later sold to his son, Charles Willoughby Davies, and retired to Beaumont.

== Family ==
Davies married Isabella Fritche Holbrook of Derbyshire on 1 August 1839. Their first child, a daughter died, soon after birth in late 1840. Four sons followed.(Mrs. Davies may have conducted the first private school north of the Torrens)

- Charles Willoughby Davies J.P. (14 Jan 1842 – 16 Jan 1914), married Frances Ann, a niece of Charles Todd, CMG
- George Joseph Davies (1 Jul 1844 – 31 Aug 1872), died Du Toit's Pan, Kimberley, South Africa
- Auguste Davies, an Adelaide solicitor (22 Nov 1847 – 21 August 1910)
- Frederick Davies, (24 Feb 1850 - 26 Feb 1913 Waverley NSW) educated at "Quaker" Moore's School with brother Charles, moved to New South Wales

Davies died of heart disease at his home in Beaumont and was buried at the West Terrace Cemetery.
