= Electoral district of City of Adelaide =

Former South Australian state electoral district

Coordinates: 34°55′44″S 138°36′4″E

City of Adelaide South Australia—House of Assembly
- State: South Australia
- Created: 1857
- Abolished: 1862
- Namesake: City of Adelaide
- Demographic: Metropolitan

City of Adelaide was an electoral district of the South Australian House of Assembly, the lower house of the bicameral legislature of the then colony of South Australia.

City of Adelaide was one of the original districts of the first Assembly created in 1857; it was abolished in 1862, when the new East Adelaide and West Adelaide districts were created, each with two members.

== Members ==
Member	Term	Member	Term	Member	Term	Member	Term	Member	Term	Member	Term
Robert Torrens	1857–1858	Richard Hanson	1857–1861	Francis Dutton	1857–1860	B. T. Finniss	1857–1860	J. B. Neales	1857–1860	W. H. Burford	1857–1859
J. M. Solomon	1858–1860	Richard Hanson	1857–1861	Francis Dutton	1857–1860	B. T. Finniss	1857–1860	J. B. Neales	1857–1860	W. H. Burford	1857–1859
J. M. Solomon	1858–1860	Richard Hanson	1857–1861	Francis Dutton	1857–1860	B. T. Finniss	1857–1860	J. B. Neales	1857–1860	William Owen	1859–1860
Thomas Reynolds	1860–1862	Richard Hanson	1857–1861	Matthew Moorhouse	1860–1862	Philip Santo	1860–1862	Samuel Bakewell	1860–1862	William Parkin	1860–1862
Thomas Reynolds	1860–1862	James Boucaut	1861–1862	Matthew Moorhouse	1860–1862	Philip Santo	1860–1862	Samuel Bakewell	1860–1862	William Parkin	1860–1862
