= William Parkin =

Australian politician

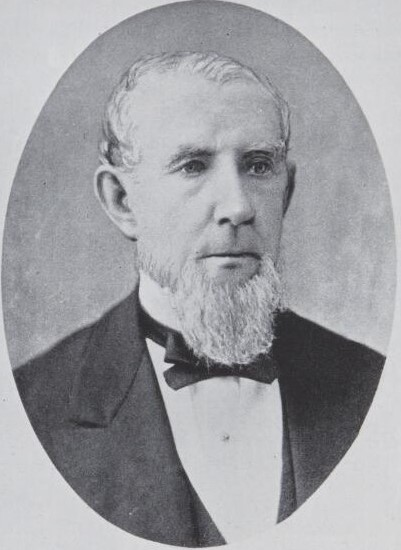
William Parkin

William Parkin (24 August 1801 – 31 May 1889) was an English-born businessman, politician and philanthropist. He emigrated to the British Province of South Australia with his wife in 1839 and represented the City of Adelaide in the House of Assembly from 1860 to 1862 before becoming a member of the Legislative Council from 1866 to 1877. Parkin was a benefactor of the South Australian Congregational Church and founded many religious philanthropic efforts.

== Biography ==
=== Early life and business career ===
William Parkin was born on 24 August 1801 in Glastonbury. He married Sarah May c. 1838, and they sailed for South Australia in the Recovery, arriving at Port Adelaide on 19 September 1839. After working briefly as a farmer near Willunga, Parkin opened a drapery on Hindley Street. Although it suffered during an 1840–1843 depression, the business recovered and by 1956, he had moved to larger premises on 30 Rundle Street with his business partner G.W. Chinner. After Parkin retired from business with a "comfortable fortune", the drapery was managed by his nephew John before Parkin found the arrangement unsatisfactory and sold it to James Marshall & Co. by 1881.

=== Political career ===
After retiring, Parkin focused on politics. He represented the City of Adelaide in the House of Assembly from 13 March 1860 to 9 November 1862 and served on the Legislative Council from 26 November 1866 to 4 April 1877. The Australian Dictionary of Biography described him as "quiet and conscientious" and he became respected for his "quaint, humorous, but intelligent addresses".

=== Religion and philanthropy ===
A philanthropist and benefactor of the South Australian Congregational Church, Parkin was a prominent member of the church Thomas Stow established on Freeman Street before attending Glenelg Congregational Church for twenty years. He was a member of the 1865 committee set up to erect the Stow Memorial Church. He founded the Parkin Trust in 1876 from an endowment of £10,000 after consulting with Richard Hanson and John Brown, which primarily funded the training of students for the students for the congregational ministry.

In 1877 he founded the Parkin Trust to benefit those studying for the Congregational ministry. Parkin College was founded with an endowment of £8,000 and 4,160 acres of land near Darwin, Northern Territory, and left another £16,000 in his Will.

He also endowed the Parkin Congregational Mission of South Australia, whose object was to maintain missions in the remote regions of South Australia and the Northern Territory; the value of his endowments to the Congregational Church totaled between £30,000 and £40,000.

He had a seat on the board of the Kadina and Wallaroo Railway Company, and was part owner of The Advertiser.

== Family ==
He married twice: on 16 May 1832 to Sarah Mary Carill (c. 1814 – 23 March 1871) and on 28 February 1872 to Ellen Stonehouse (died 13 May 1925), daughter of Rev. George Stonehouse. They lived at "Plympton House", New Plympton; after his death she lived at "Stonehenge", Partridge Street, Glenelg. He left no children.
