= 8th Parliament of South Australia =

1875–1878 meeting of the South Australian Parliament

Eighth Parliament of South Australia
←	7th	9th	→
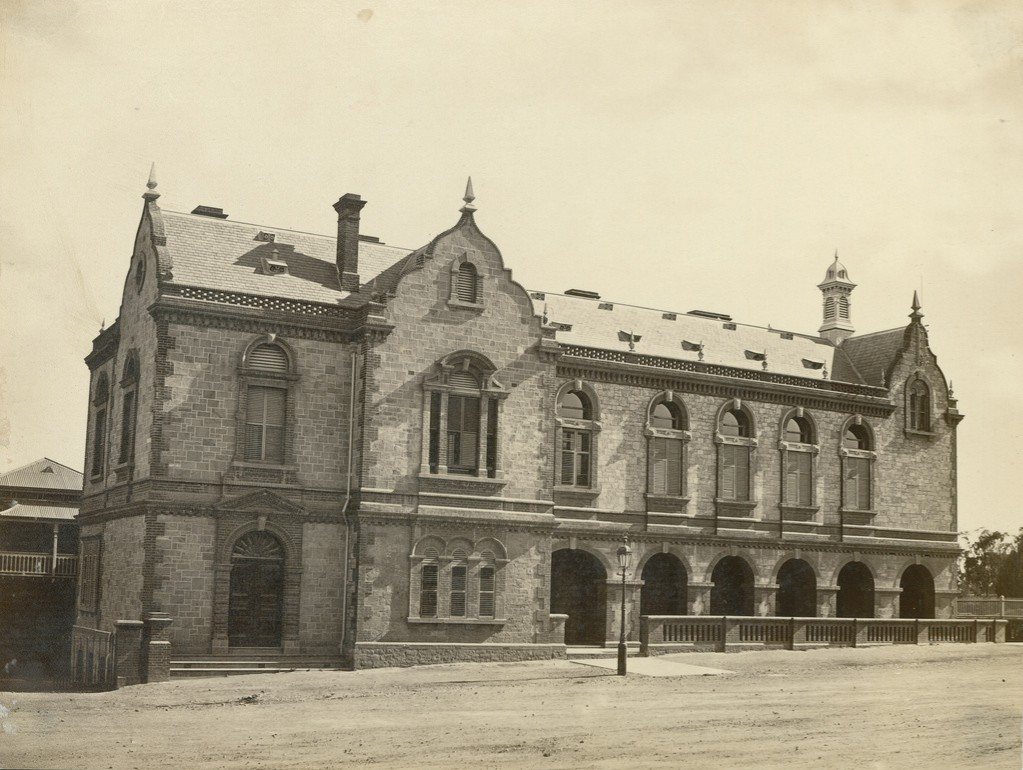
- Old Parliament House (1872)

Overview
- Legislative body: Parliament of South Australia
- Meeting place: Old Parliament House
- Term: 6 May 1875 – 13 March 1878
- Election: 10 February – 1 March 1875

Legislative Council
- Members: 18
- President: William Milne

House of Assembly
- Members: 46
- Speaker: George Strickland Kingston

Sessions
- 1st: 6 May 1875 – 15 October 1875
- 2nd: 10 November 1875 – 30 November 1875
- 3rd: 26 May 1876 – 17 November 1876
- 4th: 31 May 1877 – 21 December 1877

The 8th Parliament of South Australia was a meeting of the legislative branch of the South Australian state government, composed of the South Australian Legislative Council and the South Australian House of Assembly.

== Leadership ==
Legislative Council

- President of the Legislative Council: William Milne
- Clerk of the Legislative Council: Francis Corbet Singleton
- Clerk's assistant and Sergeant-at-arms: Frederick Halcomb

House of Assembly

- Speaker of the House of Assembly: George Strickland Kingston
- Chairman of Committees: John Carr (until 22 June 1876), William Townsend (from 22 June 1876)
- Clerk of the House of Assembly: George William de la Poer Beresford
- Clerk's assistant and Sargeant-at-arms: Edwin Gordon Blackmore

== Membership ==
=== Legislative Council ===
==== Until 5 April 1877 ====
Members elected in 1873 are marked with an asterisk (*).

▌ Henry Ayers*
▌ John Crozier
▌ John Dunn, sen.
▌ Walter Duffield*
▌ Thomas Elder
▌ Thomas English
▌ William Everard*
▌ Joseph Fisher*
▌ Alexander Hay*

▌ Thomas Hogarth*
▌ William Milne
▌ William Morgan
▌ Alexander Borthwick Murray
▌ William Parkin
▌ William Sandover
▌ Philip Santo
▌ William Storrie
▌ Robert Alfred Tarlton*

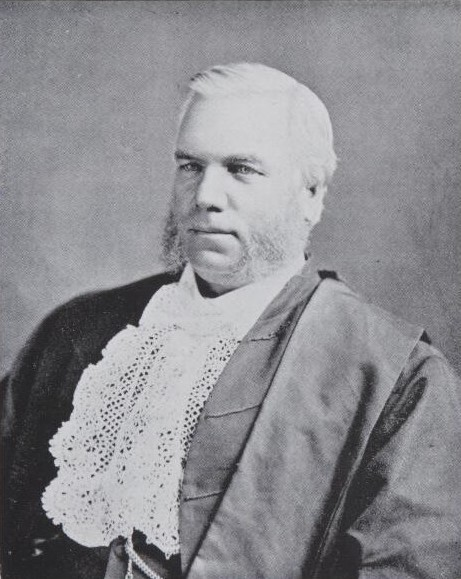
Legislative Council President
William Milne

==== From 5 April 1877 ====
6 of the 18 seats in the upper house were contested in the election on 5 April 1877. Members elected in 1877 are marked with an asterisk (*).

▌ Henry Ayers
▌ Richard Chaffey Baker*
▌ John Crozier*
▌ Walter Duffield
▌ Thomas Elder
▌ Thomas English*
▌ William Everard
▌ Joseph Fisher
▌ Alexander Hay

▌ Thomas Hogarth
▌ Henry Kent Hughes*
▌ William Milne
▌ William Morgan*
▌ James Pearce*
▌ William Sandover
▌ Philip Santo
▌ William Storrie
▌ Robert Alfred Tarlton

=== House of Assembly ===
Albert

▌ Arthur Hardy
▌ William Rodolph Wigley

Barossa

▌ Martin Peter Friedrich Basedow
▌ John Dunn, jun.

Burra

▌ Rowland Rees
▌ Ben Rounsevell

East Adelaide

▌ John Cox Bray
▌ William Kay

East Torrens

▌ David Murray
▌ Thomas Playford

Encounter Bay

▌ James Boucaut
▌ Arthur Fydell Lindsay

Flinders

▌ Patrick Boyce Coglin
▌ Ebenezer Cooke (politician)
▌ John Williams

Gumeracha

▌ Frederick Hannaford
▌ Ebenezer Ward

Light

▌ Jenkin Coles
▌ David Nock
▌ James White

Mount Barker

▌ Albert Henry Landseer
▌ James Garden Ramsay

Noarlunga

▌ John Carr
▌ John Colton

North Adelaide

▌ Neville Blyth

Onkaparinga

▌ William Henry Dunn
▌ Friedrich Edouard Heinrich Wulf Krichauff

Port Adelaide

▌ David Bower
▌ William Quin

Stanley

▌ George Strickland Kingston
▌ Charles Mann

Sturt

▌ Thomas King
▌ William Townsend

Victoria

▌ Lavington Glyde
▌ George Charles Hawker

Wallaroo

▌ John James Duncan
▌ John Richards
▌ Robert Dalrymple Ross

West Adelaide

▌ John Darling, sen.
▌ Thomas Johnson

West Torrens

▌ John Pickering
▌ John Mitchell Sinclair

Wooroora

▌ John Bosworth
▌ Henry Edward Bright

Yatala

▌ Wentworth Cavenagh
▌ Thomas Cowan

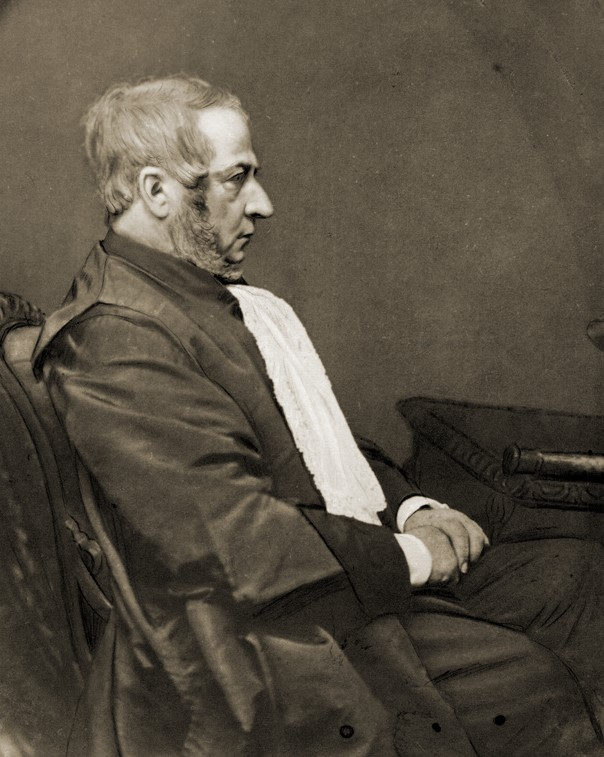
House of Assembly Speaker
George Strickland Kingston

== Changes of membership ==
=== House of Assembly ===
Seat	Before	Change		After	
Seat	Member	Type	Date	Date	Member
Yatala	Wentworth Cavenagh	Resigned	6 May 1875	17 May 1875	Wentworth Cavenagh
Yatala	Lavington Glyde	Resigned	6 May 1875	17 May 1875	Thomas Cowan
Light	Randolph Isham Stow	Resigned	6 May 1875	17 May 1875	Jenkin Coles
Wallaroo	Matthew Henry Madge	Unseated	20 May 1875	4 June 1875	Robert Dalrymple Ross
Barossa	Johann Wilhelm Albrecht Sudholz	Unseated	22 May 1875	9 June 1875	John Dunn, jun.
Albert	Mountifort Longfield Conner	Resigned	23 June 1875	12 July 1875	William Rodolph Wigley
Wooroora	James Pearce	Resigned	27 July 1875	7 August 1875	John Bosworth
Sturt	Samuel James Way	Resigned	20 March 1876	10 April 1876	Thomas King
Mount Barker	William West-Erskine	Resigned	21 April 1876	1 May 1876	James Garden Ramsay
Barossa	John Howard Angas	Resigned	10 May 1876	20 May 1876	Martin Peter Friedrich Basedow
West Adelaide	William Knox Simms	Resigned	13 June 1876	21 June 1876	John Darling, sen.
West Torrens	Benjamin Taylor	Resigned	19 September 1876	27 September 1876	John Mitchell Sinclair
North Adelaide	Arthur Blyth	Accepted office of profit	21 February 1877	14 March 1877	Neville Blyth
East Torrens	Edwin Thomas Smith	Resigned	1 March 1877	27 March 1877	David Murray
Victoria	John Ingleby	Resigned	11 April 1877	17 May 1877	Lavington Glyde
Albert	William Rodolph Wigley	Resigned	5 March 1878		Vacant

== See also ==
- Members of the South Australian Legislative Council, 1873–1877
- Members of the South Australian Legislative Council, 1877–1881
- Members of the South Australian House of Assembly, 1875–1878
