= Members of the South Australian House of Assembly, 1875–1878 =

This is a list of members of the eighth parliament of the South Australian House of Assembly, which sat from 6 May 1875 until 13 March 1878. The members were elected at the 1875 election.

Name	Electorate	Term in Office
John Howard Angas ^{[9]}	Barossa	1871–1876
M. P. F. Basedow ^{[9]}	Barossa	1878–1901
Hon Arthur Blyth ^{[12]}	North Adelaide	1857–1868, 1870–1877
Neville Blyth ^{[12]}	North Adelaide	1860–1867, 1868–1870, 1871, 1877–1878
James Boucaut	Encounter Bay	1861–1862, 1865–1870, 1871–1878
John Bosworth ^{[6]}	Wooroora	1875–1884
David Bower	Port Adelaide	1865–1870, 1875–1887
John Cox Bray	East Adelaide	1871–1892
Henry Edward Bright	Wooroora	1875–1884
John Carr	Noarlunga	1865–1879, 1881–1884
Wentworth Cavenagh ^{[2]}	Yatala	1862–1875, 1875–1881
Patrick Boyce Coglin	Flinders	1860–1868, 1870–1871, 1875–1881, 1882–1887
Jenkin Coles ^{[1]}	Light	1875–1878, 1881–1911
John Colton	Noarlunga	1862–1870, 1875–1878, 1880–1887
Mountifort Conner ^{[5]}	Albert	1875–1875
Ebenezer Cooke	Flinders	1875–1882
Thomas Cowan ^{[2]}	Yatala	1875–1878
John Darling Sr. ^{[10]}	West Adelaide	1870–1871, 1876–1881, 1885–1887
John Duncan	Wallaroo	1871–1875, 1875–1878, 1884–1890
John Dunn Jr. ^{[4]}	Barossa	1875–1878
William Dunn	Onkaparinga	1875–1878
Lavington Glyde ^{[2]} ^{[14]}	Yatala, Victoria	1857–1875, 1877–1884
Frederick Hannaford	Gumeracha	1875–1878
Arthur Hardy	Albert	1875–1886, 1886–1887
George Charles Hawker	Victoria	1858–1865, 1875–1883, 1884–1895
John Ingleby ^{[14]}	Yatala, Victoria	1875–1877
Thomas Johnson	West Adelaide	1875–1878, 1881–1884
William Kay	East Adelaide	1875–1878
Thomas King ^{[7]}	Sturt	1875–1881, 1882–1885
George Strickland Kingston	Stanley	1862–1881
Friedrich Krichauff	Onkaparinga	1857–1858, 1870–1882, 1884–1890
Albert Henry Landseer	Mount Barker	1875–1899
Arthur Fydell Lindsay	Encounter Bay	1857–1860, 1870–1871, 1873–1878
Matthew Madge ^{[3]}	Wallaroo	1875
Charles Mann	Stanley	1870–1881
David Murray ^{[13]}	East Torrens	1870–1871, 1877–1878, 1881
David Nock	Light	1875–1878
James Pearce ^{[6]}	Wooroora	1870–1875, 1875
John Pickering	West Torrens	1865–1868, 1870, 1871–1878
Thomas Playford	East Torrens	1868–1871, 1875–1887, 1887–1890, 1899–1901
William Quin	Port Adelaide	1870–1871, 1875–1880
James G. Ramsay ^{[8]}	Mount Barker	1870–1875, 1876–1878
Rowland Rees	Burra	1873–1881, 1882–1890
John Richards	Wallaroo	1875–1878
Robert Dalrymple Ross ^{[3]}	Wallaroo	1875–1887
Ben Rounsevell	Burra	1875–1890
William Knox Simms ^{[10]}	West Adelaide	1868–1870, 1871–1876, 1878–1881
J. M. Sinclair ^{[11]}	West Torrens	1876–1878
Edwin Thomas Smith ^{[13]}	East Torrens	1871–1877, 1878–1893
Randolph Isham Stow ^{[1]}	Light	1861–1865, 1866–1868, 1873–1875
Johann Sudholz ^{[4]}	Barossa	1875
Benjamin Taylor ^{[11]}	West Torrens	1875–1876
William Townsend	Sturt	1857–1882
Ebenezer Ward	Gumeracha	1870–1880, 1881–1890
Samuel Way ^{[7]}	Sturt	1875–1876
William West-Erskine ^{[8]}	Mount Barker	1871–1876, 1878–1881
James White	Light	1871, 1875–1881
William Wigley ^{[5]}	Albert	1875–1878
John Williams	Flinders	1864–1868, 1875–1878

^{1} Light MHA Randolph Isham Stow resigned on 6 May 1875. Jenkin Coles won the resulting by-election on 17 May.
^{2} The two members for Yatala, Wentworth Cavenagh and Lavington Glyde, both resigned on 6 May 1875. Both men recontested the resulting by-election, which saw Cavenagh returned but Glyde defeated by Thomas Cowan.
^{3} Matthew Madge was initially declared elected as a member for Wallaroo, but his election was challenged and he was unseated on 20 May 1875. Robert Dalrymple Ross won the resulting by-election on 4 June.
^{4} Johann Sudholz was initially declared elected as a member for Barossa, but his election was challenged and he was unseated on 22 May 1875. John Dunn Jr. won the resulting by-election on 9 June.
^{5} Albert MHA Mountifort Conner resigned on 6 May 1875. William Wigley won the resulting by-election on 17 May.
^{6} Wooroora MHA James Pearce resigned on 27 July 1875. John Bosworth won the resulting by-election on 7 August.
^{7} Sturt MHA Samuel Way resigned on 20 March 1876 to take up the position of Chief Justice of the Supreme Court of South Australia. Thomas King won the resulting by-election on 10 April.
^{8} Mount Barker MHA William West-Erskine resigned on 21 April 1876. James G. Ramsay won the resulting by-election on 1 May.
^{9} Barossa MHA John Howard Angas resigned on 10 May 1875. M. P. F. Basedow won the resulting by-election on 20 May.
^{10} West Adelaide MHA William Knox Simms resigned on 13 June 1876. John Darling Sr. won the resulting by-election on 21 June.
^{11} West Torrens MHA Benjamin Taylor resigned on 19 September 1876. John Sinclair won the resulting by-election on 27 September.
^{12} North Adelaide MHA Arthur Blyth accepted the office of South Australia's Agent General in London on 21 February 1877. His brother, Neville Blyth, won the resulting by-election on 14 March.
^{13} East Torrens MHA Edwin Thomas Smith resigned on 1 March 1877. David Murray won the resulting by-election on 27 March.
^{14} Victoria MHA John Ingleby resigned on 11 April 1877. Lavington Glyde won the resulting by-election on 17 May.
