= Political families of South Australia =

This is a list of related persons who have held positions in the two South Australian houses of parliament or represented South Australia in Canberra. It includes some notes on people with identical surnames but no clear family connection.

Note: The following abbreviations have been used below:

MHA = South Australian House of Assembly
MLC = South Australian Legislative Council, including original unicameral parliament (1840–56)
MHR = (Federal) House of Representatives

Indented entries indicate a son or daughter unless otherwise noted.

== Angas ==
- George Fife Angas (1789–1879) MLC 1851–1857, 1857–1866

- John Howard Angas (1823–1904) MHA for Barossa 1871–75; MLC (Central district) 1887–94.

== Bagot ==
- Captain Charles Hervey Bagot (1788–1880) MLC 1844–51, 1851–53, 1857–61, 1865–69

- John Bagot (1849–1910) (grandson of Charles) MHA 1884–87

- John Tuthill Bagot (1819–1870) ("nephew" of Charles) MHA 1857–65; MLC 1866–70; described as his nephew, but actually more distantly related.

== Baker ==
- John Baker (1813–1872) MLC 1851–61, 1863–72 and Premier 1857–57

- Sir Richard Chaffey Baker KCMG (1842–1911) MHA for Barossa 1868–71; MLC 1873–1901; (Federal) Senate 1901–06.

Jacob Hagen (c. 1810–1870), MLC from 1843–51 was a brother-in-law.

== Bakewell ==
- Samuel Bakewell (c. 1815–1888) MHA 1860–62
- his brother William Bakewell (c. 1817–1870) MHA 1857–60, 1862–64

== Bardolph ==
- Ken Bardolph architect and Labor MLC 1941–1964
- Doug Bardolph (brother of Ken) journalist and Lang Labor and (independent) Labor MHA for Adelaide 1933–1944

== Basedow ==
- Martin Peter Friedrich Basedow MLC 1894–1900

- Herbert Basedow MLA for Barossa 1927–30, 1933

== Blyth ==
- Sir Arthur Blyth KCMG CB (1823–1891) MLC 1855–57; MHA for Gumeracha 1857–68, 1870–75, for North Adelaide 1875–77, Premier 1864–65, 1871–72 and 1873–75
- Neville Blyth (1825–1890) (brother of Arthur) MHA for East Torrens 1860–67, for Encounter Bay 1868–70 and North Adelaide 1877–78

== Brookman ==
- Norman Brookman MLC (Southern district) 1941–1949 Son of Sir George Brookman

- David Norman MHA for Alexandra 1948–73

== Butler ==
- Sir Richard Butler MHA for Yatala 1890–1902; MHA for Barossa 1902–24; Premier March 1905 – July 1905

- Sir Richard Layton Butler MHA for Wooroora 1915–18, 1921–38; MHA for Light 1938; Premier 1927–30, 1933–38.

their great-grandson and grandson respectively

- Mark Butler (MHR for Port Adelaide 2007–

== Castine ==
- Col. John William Castine MHA for Wooroora 1884–1902

- Ernest William Castine MLC 1933–47

== Cooke ==
- Ebenezer Cooke (1832–1907) MHA for Flinders 1875–82

- J. Herbert Cooke (1867–1943) MLC (Central district) 1915–33

== Corcoran ==
- Jim Corcoran (1885–1965) MHA for Victoria 1945–47, 1953–56; MHA for Millicent 1956–1962.

- Des Corcoran (1928–2004) MHA for Millicent 1962–75, MHA for Coles 1975–1977; MHA for Hartley 1977–1982; Premier 1979.

== Cowan ==
- Thomas Cowan (1839–90) MHA for Yatala 1875–78.

- Sir John Cowan (1866–1953) MLC (Southern Districts) 1910–44

- John Lancelot Cowan (1893–1971) MLC (Southern Districts) 1949–59.

- James Cowan (1848–1890) (brother of Thomas) MHA for Yatala 1890

== Darling ==
- John Darling Sr. (1831–1916) MHA for West Adelaide 1870–71, 1876–78; Yatala 1878–1881; Stanley 1885–1887 then MLC (Northern district) 1888–1897

- John Darling Jr. (1852–1914) MHA for East Torrens 1896–1902, and Torrens 1902–1905

== Dashwood ==
- George Frederick Dashwood (1806–1881) MLC 1843–1844

- Charles James Dashwood (1842–1919) MHA for Noarlunga 1887–1892

== Davenport ==
- Robert Davenport (1816–1896), brother of Samuel, MLC, electoral district of Hindmarsh, 1851–1854.
- Sir Samuel Davenport (1818–1906), brother of Robert, MLC, 1846–1848, 1855–1857 and 1857–1866 (as a non-official nominee).
- (nephew) George Davenport (1831–1881) was a Queensland politician, son of Robert and Samuel's older brother (George) Francis who had preceded them to South Australia

== Dawkins ==
- Boyd Dawkins (1917–1996) MLC 1962–1982 (represented electoral district of Midland before 1973 reforms when Upper House districts were abolished)

- (son) John Dawkins (born 1954) MLC 1997– (still serving).
- (nephew) John Dawkins (born 1947) (Federal) MHR for Tangney 1974–1975, Fremantle 1977–1994

== Downer ==
- Sir John Downer (1843–1915) MHA for Barossa 1878–1901; Australian Senate 1901–03; MLC 1905–07; Premier 1885–1887

- Alexander Downer, Sr. (1910–1981) MHR for Angas 1949–63

- Alexander Downer (1951– ) MHR for Mayo 1984–2008

- Henry Edward Downer (1836–1905) (brother of Sir John) MHA for Encounter Bay 1881–96

== Duncan ==
- Sir John Duncan (1845–1913) MHA for Port Adelaide 1871–75, MHA for Wallaroo 1875–1877, MHA for Wooroora 1884–90, MLC (North-Eastern district) 1891–1896, 1900–1913.

- Sir Walter Gordon Duncan (1885–1963) MLC for Midland 1918–1962.

== Dunn ==
- John Dunn (1802–1894) MHA for Mount Barker 1857–68; MLC 1869–77

- John Dunn Jr. (1830–1892) MHA for Barossa 1875–78; MLC 1880–88
- William Henry Dunn (1841–1891) MHA for Onkaparinga 1875–78
- William Paltridge (1824–1890) (son-in-law of John Sr.) MHA for Victoria 1870–71
- Herbert Charles Dunn (1883–1952) (great-nephew of John Sr.) was MHA for Stirling 1938–52

George Alexander Dunn was not closely related, nor was Henry Peter Kestel Dunn.

== Dutton ==
- Francis Stacker Dutton (1818–1877) seventh Premier of South Australia
- Frederick Hansborough Dutton (1812–1890), his brother, MLC 1852–1853

Queensland politician Charles Dutton (1834–1904), and his great, great grandson Peter Dutton appear not to be related to this family.

== Everard ==
- Dr. Charles George Everard (1794–1876) MLC 1857–69

- William Everard (1819–1889) MHA for Encounter Bay 1865–70, 1871–72; MLC 1873–78

== Giles ==
- William Giles (1791–1862), colonial manager and MLC 1851–54.

- (great-great-grandson) Geoffrey O'Halloran Giles (1923–1990) MLC 1959–64, MHR for Angas 1964–77, Wakefield 1977–83

== Glyde ==
- William Dening Glyde (1826–1901) MLC 1882–1887
- Samuel Dening Glyde (1842–1896), his brother, MHA for Sturt 1885 to 1887

Any relation to Lavington Glyde (1825–1890) MHA for East Torrens 1857–1860, Yatala 1860–1875, Victoria 1877–1884 ?

== Goldsworthy ==
- (Eric) Roger Goldsworthy MHA for Kavel 1970–92; Deputy Premier 1979–82

- (Roger) Mark Goldsworthy MHA for Kavel 2002–present

== Gordon ==
- Sir David John Gordon MLC for Midlands 1913–1944

- Douglas Peel Gordon MLC for Midlands 1947–1948

== Grainger ==
- John Grainger (1803–1872), non-official MLC 1851–1855

- (nephew) H. Allerdale Grainger (1848–1923), MLA for Wallaroo 1884–1885 and 1890–1901

== Hall ==
- Steele Hall Premier of South Australia 1968–70, Senator for South Australia 1974–77, MHR for Boothby 1981–96
- Joan Hall (spouse of Steele Hall) MHA for Coles 1993–2002, MHA for Morialta 2002–2006.

== Hart ==
- Captain John Hart CMG (1809–1873) MHA for Port Adelaide 1857–59, 1862, 1862–66; Premier 1865–66

- John Hart, Jr. (1848–1881) MHA for Port Adelaide 1880–81

== Hawke ==
- Albert Hawke (1900–1986), MHA for Burra Burra 1924–1927 and Premier of Western Australia 1953–1959 was uncle of

- Bob Hawke (1929–2019), Prime Minister of Australia 1983–1991

(James Renfrey Hawke (25 September 1862 – 12/13 September 1930) and Elizabeth Ann Hawke née Pascoe (31 December 1862 – 27 December 1946) of Kapunda were parents of Albert Hawke and Clem Hawke (1898–1989), father of Bob Hawke).

== Hawker ==
- George Charles Hawker (1818–1895) MHA for Victoria 1858–65, 1875–83

- Charles Allan Seymour Hawker (1894–1938) (grandson of G.C. Hawker) MHR for Wakefield 1929–38

- Edward William Hawker (1850–1940) (son of G.C. Hawker) MHA for Stanley 1884–1889, 1893–96

- George Stanley Hawker MC. (7 May 1894 – 17 February 1979) MHA for Burra 1947–56

== Hill ==
- Murray Hill MLC 1965–88

- Robert Hill, son of Murray, Senator for South Australia 1981–2006 and Minister for Defence 2001–2006

== Henning ==
- Rudolph Wilhelm Emil Henning ( – 1884) MHA for Albert 1878–1884

- Andrew Harriot Henning (1865–1947) member Western Australian Legislative Council from June 1897 to May 1898

== Homburg ==
- Robert Homburg (1848–1912) MHA for Gumeracha 1884–1902; MHA for Murray 1902–05

- Hermann Robert Homburg (1874–1964) MHA for Murray 1906–1915, 1927–1930; MLC (Central district) 1933–1941
- Robert Otto Homburg (1875–1948) MHA for Burra Burra 1912–1915

== Hussey ==
- Charles Henry Hussey (1832–1899) MHA for Encounter Bay 1887–1890
- (nephew) George Hussey (1852–1935) MHA for Sturt 1921–1924

== Jelley ==
- David Jelley (c. 1871–1907) MLC 1906–07 died after sitting only one session
- (his brother) James Jelley (1873–1954) MLC 1912–33; member of Hill and Gunn Ministries

== Kelly ==
- Hugh Craine Kelly (1848–1891) MHA for Wooroora 1890 to 1891 when he died in buggy accident
- Robert Kelly (1845–1920) succeeded his brother as member for Wooroora 1891 to 1893
- their cousin John Robert Kelly (1849–1919) was MHA for Encounter Bay 1890 to 1896

== Kingston ==
- Sir George Strickland Kingston (1807–80) MLA for The Burra and Clare 1856–1860, 1861–1862; MLA for Stanley 1862–1880

- Charles Cameron Kingston QC. (1850–1808) MLA for West Adelaide 1881–1900; MLC (Central district) 1900

== Lake ==
- James Andrew Trehane Lake MHA for Barossa 1871–75
- (his brother) George Hingston Lake MHA for Burra 1890–96

== Lindsay ==
- John Lindsay, MHA for Encounter Bay 1860–65 and The Sturt 1870–71
- Charles Lindsay (brother of John) MHA for Flinders 1862–65

(Arthur Fydell Lindsay, MHA for Encounter Bay on three occasions, appears to be unrelated.)

== McLachlan ==
- James McLachlan Sr. MHA for Wooroora 1893–1902

- James McLachlan MHA for Wooroora 1918–1930; Senator for South Australia 1934–1946

== Mildred ==
- Henry Mildred MHA for Noarlunga 1857–1860; East Torrens 1860–1865; MLC 1866–1873

- Henry Hay Mildred MHA for East Torrens 1870–1871

== Milne ==
- Sir William Milne MHA for Onkaparinga 1857–1868; MLC in 1869, 1873–1881

- (great-grandson) Lance Milne MLC for Australia Party 1979–1985

- daughter Florence Marion Milne married (later Sir) John Lancelot Stirling, MHA for Mount Barker 1881–1887; Gumeracha 1888–1890; MLC 1891–1932

== Morphett ==
- John Morphett MLC 1843–1955, 1857–1973
- George Morphett (brother of John) MHA for West Torrens 1860–61

- George Cummins Morphett (grandson of John) MHA for Murray 1933–1938

== Newland ==
- Simpson Newland CMG. MHA for Encounter Bay 1881–87

- Victor Marra Newland MC OBE. MHA for North Adelaide 1933–38

David Wark MLA for Murray 1857–62 had a tenuous relationship with the Newlands: his son James Keeling Wark (c. 1847–1886) married Mary Newland (1854–1942), a niece of Simpson Newland, and David Wark's wife Catherine/Catharine? née Keeling (–1859) was a sister of Ridgway William Newland's second wife Martha née Keeling (1797–1870).

(John Newland MHA for Burra Burra 1906–12 and Senator for South Australia, was not related — his birth name (later resumed) was Newlands.)

== Pearce ==
- George Pearce (1826–1908), MHA for East Torrens 1868–1870

- A nephew, Sir George Foster Pearce KCVO (1870–1952) was a Senator for Western Australia 1901–1938

It is not likely that James Pearce (MHA for Light 1870–1875 then Wooroora, and MLC 1877–1881) was a relative.

== Price ==
- Thomas Price (1852–1941) MHA for Sturt 1893–1902; MHA for Torrens 1902–1909; Premier 1905–1909

- John Lloyd Price (1882–1941) MHA for Port Adelaide 1915–25, MHR for Boothby 1928–1941

== Playford ==
- Thomas Playford Sr. (1837–1915) MLA for Onkaparinga 1868–71; MLA for East Torrens 1875–1887; MLA for Newcastle 1887–1890; MLA for East Torrens 1890–1894; MLA for Gumeracha 1899–1901; Premier 1887–89, 1890–92

- Sir Thomas Playford GCMG. (1896–1981) MLA for Murray 1933–38; MLA for Gumeracha 1938–1968; Premier 1938–65

== Randell ==
- William Randell "Captain Randell" (1824–1911) MHA for Gumeracha 1893–1899.

- John Beavis Randell (1877–1953) MHA for Murray 1921–1924

== Riddoch ==
- John Riddoch (1827–1901) was MHA for the Victoria 1865–1870 and 1871–1873
- His brother George Riddoch (1842–1919) was MHA for the Victoria 1893–1896 and MLC 1901–1909

== Rudall ==
- Samuel Bruce Rudall MHA for Barossa 1906–15

- Reginald John Rudall MHA for Barossa 1933–38; MHA for Angas 1938–44; MLC for Midland 1944–1955

== Sandford ==
- Alexander Wallace Sandford MLC 1897–1902

- Sir (James) Wallace Sandford MLC 1938–56

== Shannon ==
- David Shannon (c. 1822–1875) MHA for Light 1858–60
- James Shannon (c. 1840–1891), half-brother of David, MHA for Light 1878–81
- John Wallace Shannon (1862–1926) (nephew of David and half-nephew of James), MHA for Yorke Peninsula 1896–02; MHA for Wallaroo 1902–05; Senator for South Australia 1914–20.

- Howard Huntley Shannon (1892–1976) MHA for Murray 1933–38; MHA for Onkaparinga 1938–68.

== Solomon ==
- Emanuel Solomon (1800–1873) MLA for West Adelaide 1862–65; MLC 1867–71. His oldest brother Moss Solomon (c. 1796–1849) was father of Judah Moss Solomon

- Judah Moss Solomon (1818–1880) (nephew) MLA for City of Adelaide 1858–60; MLC 1861–66; MLA for West Adelaide 1871–1875; Mayor of Adelaide 1869–1871.

- Vaiben Louis Solomon (1853–1908) MLA for Northern Territory 1890–1901, 1905–08; MHR for the Division of South Australia 1901–03. He was Premier in 1899 for seven days.

Saul Solomon (1836–1929) MLA for East Torrens 1887–90, when he defeated Thomas Playford, was not a close relation.

== Stirling ==
- Edward Stirling (1804–1873) MLC (single electorate) 1857–65

- Sir Edward Charles Stirling (1848–1917) MHA for North Adelaide 1884–87
- Sir John Lancelot Stirling C.M.G. (1849–1932) MHA for Mount Barker 1881–87; MLC (Southern district) 1891–32

== Stow ==
- Randolph Isham Stow QC. (1828–1878) MHA for West Torrens 1861–62; MHA for Victoria 1862–65; MHA for East Torrens 1866–68; MHA for Light 1873–75, 1875
- Augustine Stow (1833–1903) (brother of Randolph) MHA for West Torrens 1862–65; MHA for Flinders 1866–68

== Vardon ==
- Joseph Vardon Senator for South Australia 1907–1913

- Edward Charles Vardon MHA for Sturt 1918–21, 1924–30; Australian Senate 1921–23

== Venning ==
- Howard Maxwell Venning MHA for Rocky River 1968–79

- Ivan Howard Venning MHA for Custance 1990–97; MHA for Schubert 1997–2014.

== Verran ==
- John Verran (1856–1932) MHA for Wallaroo from 1901–1918, First Labor Premier of South Australia 1910–1912

- John Stanley "Stan" Verran (1883–1952) MHA for Port Adelaide 1918–1924, 1925–1927

== von Doussa ==
Brothers

- Alfred von Doussa (1848–1926), MLC 1901–1921
- Louis von Doussa (1850–1932), MHA for Mount Barker 1889–1902, MLC for Southern District 1903–1905

== Weatherill ==
- George Weatherill (1936–2021) MLC 1986–2000

- Jay Weatherill (1964– ) MHA for Cheltenham 2002–

== White ==
- James White (c. 1820–1890) MHA for Light 1871, 1875–81

- A nephew (James) Wharton White (c. 1855–1930) MHA for Light 1890–96
- A niece Lilla Rebecca Wharton White (1858–1934) married Edward Keane (1844–1904), a Western Australian MLA and MLC.

== Williams ==
- Thomas Williams (c. 1794–1881) non-official MLC (1843).

- John Williams (1824–1890) MLA for Barossa 1864–1865 and for Flinders 1865–1868 and 1875–1878

== Wilson ==
- Sir Keith Wilson (1900–1987) Senator for South Australia 1938–1944 and MHR for Sturt 1949–1954, 1955–1966

- Ian Wilson (1932–2013) MHR for Sturt 1966–69, 1972–93.
  Ian was great-grandson of Sir John Langdon Bonython MHR for South Australia 1901–06 and a great-great grandson of Sir John Cox Bray KCMG JP (1842–1894), MHA for East Adelaide 1871–92 and Premier of South Australia 1881–84.

== Wright ==
- John David "Jack" Wright MHA for Adelaide 1971–85; Deputy Premier 1982–85

- Michael Wright MHA for Lee 1997–2014.

== Young ==
- Charles Burney Young MLC 1878–1880

- Harry Dove Young MLC 1927–1941

== Sources ==
- Parliament of South Australia – Statistical Record
- "Father and Son as Ministers". The Advertiser. Adelaide: National Library of Australia. 23 December 1909. p. 6.
- "Father and Son". The Register. Adelaide: National Library of Australia. 27 August 1926. p. 16.
- "Out Among the People". The Advertiser. Adelaide: National Library of Australia. 13 February 1940. p. 17.

== See also ==
- Political families of Australia
