= 1875 Yatala colonial by-election =

By-election in South Australia

A by-election was held for the South Australian House of Assembly seat of Yatala on 17 May 1875 as a result of the resignation of Wentworth Cavenagh and Lavington Glyde.

Three candidates had nominated for the 1875 election for the two member district of Yatala, the two sitting members, Wentworth Cavenagh and Lavington Glyde, and Thomas Cowan. Cowan's nomination papers were declared informal and Cavenagh and Glyde were declared elected. The candidates declared elected, Wentworth Cavenagh and Lavington Glyde, resigned in order to hold an election.

== Results ==
Yatala by-election, Monday 17 May 1875
| Candidate | Votes | % |
|---|---|---|
| Wentworth Cavenagh (re-elected) | 334 | 38.0 |
| Thomas Cowan (elected) | 321 | 36.5 |
| Lavington Glyde (defeated) | 224 | 25.5 |
| Turnout | 879 | |

== See also ==
- List of South Australian state by-elections
