= William Bartley =

William Bartley may refer to:

- W. W. Bartley III (1934–1990), American philosopher
- William Bartley (politician) (1801–1885), Australian lawyer and politician
