= Richard Newland =

Richard Newland may refer to:

- Richard Newland (cricketer) (1713–1778), English cricketer
- Richard Newland (racehorse trainer), British horse trainer
- Richard Francis Newland (died 1873), banker and politician in the colony of South Australia
