= Bedford Phoenix Incorporated =

Australian disability organisation

Bedford Group
- Founded: 31 December 2014
- Headquarters: South Australia, Australia
- Region served: South Australia
- Affiliations: National Disability Services
- Website: https://bedfordgroup.com.au/

Bedford Phoenix Incorporated was formed in 2014 as a result of the amalgamation of the Bedford Group and the Phoenix Society. Operating across regional South Australia and metropolitan Adelaide, Bedford provides supported employment, supported independent living, and NDIS services to people with disabilities. Total revenue in 2014–2015 was $62,056,000, with a profit of $3,600,000.

== History ==
=== Bedford Industries ===
- 1920 the Civilian Tubercular and Cancer Comforts Fund
- 1943 South Australian Tuberculosis Association Incorporated (SATAI)
- 1945 Bedford Industries at Glenelg
- 1949 moved to Panorama fundraising commenced in 1946 with a promise to match funds up to £20,000 from the Government of South Australia and £1,000 of the Societies funds
- 2010 took on responsibility for Heritage Industries in Mount Gambier

=== Phoenix Society ===
- Origins in The South Australian Standing Committee for the Welfare of the Physically Handicapped, of the SA Council of Social Services (SACOSS)
- May 1958 Phoenix Society formed
- 1959, with a workshop in Carrington Street, Adelaide
- 1962 Eastwood facility
- 1979–1988 Torrensville Assessment and Training Centre
- 1981 second workshop facility

== People ==
=== Bedford Industries ===
- Darcy Rivers Warren Cowan championed the establishment of Bedford Industries
- Ted Byrt
- Neil Sachse

=== Phoenix Society ===
- Gordon Maxwell Reid, MBE was appointed Life Governor of Phoenix Society in 1977.
