= Grant Foster =

Grant Foster (born 1945) is an Australian composer, pianist, teacher and novelist. He was the co-founder and inaugural artistic director of the Southern Highlands International Piano Competition. His musical is lyrical and well crafted, and he is well-known in Russia, despite being relatively unknown in his own country.

Grant Foster was born in Sydney in 1945 and studied at the Sydney Conservatorium of Music under Alexander Sverjensky, then in Paris under Marcel Ciampi, to whom he was recommended by Yehudi Menuhin after hearing him play, and under Denise Rivière. In 1966 Foster won the State ABC Concerto Competition with his performance of the Piano Concerto in D-flat by Aram Khachaturian.

The musical Peter Pan, directed by Sir Robert Helpmann, with music by Foster, ran in London for seven consecutive Christmas seasons. After 20 years in Europe, he returned to Australia in 1985. In 2007 he co-founded the Southern Highlands International Piano Competition, which is held every two years. He was its artistic director until 2013, when he was succeeded by Gerard Willems.

He is better known in Russia than in Australia. His works have been recorded by the Novaya Rossiya State Symphony Orchestra, by the Serbian-born pianist Mira Yevtich, among others.

Foster has also written eight novels, six of them for children. He resides in Bowral, New South Wales.

== Selected works ==
List of albums, with selected details
Title	Details
Rhapsody for Piano And Orchestra (with Sydney Symphony Orchestra)	Released: 1986; Format: LP; Label: His Master's Voice (OASD-270353)
Grant Foster	Released: 1987; Format: LP; Label: His Master's Voice (OASD-430056)
The Harrods Selection Volume Three	Released: 1993; Format: CD; Label: Harrods (HSCD3)
The Pearl of Dubai Suite & The Ballad of the Reading Gaol	Released: 2012; Format: Digital; Label: Mira Yevtich
When Love Speaks: Works for Piano Composed and Performed By Grant Foster	Released: 2016; Format: CD, Digital; Label: Melba Recordings (MR 301147)

== Awards and nominations ==
=== ARIA Music Awards ===
The ARIA Music Awards is an annual awards ceremony that recognises excellence, innovation, and achievement across all genres of Australian music. They commenced in 1987.

Year	Nominee / work	Award	Result	Ref.
1987	Rhapsody for Piano and Orchestra	Best Classical Album	Nominated	
