= Hartley Williams (priest) =

Anglican priest and teacher in South Australia (1844–1927)

Hartley Williams (1844 – 18 January 1927) was an Anglican priest in South Australia who ran a private school in Mount Gambier.

== History ==
Williams was born in South Australia, a son of Thomas Williams (c. 1794–1881) and his second wife, Catherine née Codd, who arrived on the Platina in February 1839. His father was a banker and farmer and was appointed to the Legislative Council. He was jailed for six months for false pretences and died in England.

Williams was educated at St Peter's College, Adelaide, and entered St Mary's Hall, Oxford University, but returned to Adelaide without a degree.

In 1871 he was ordained by Bishop Short as a deacon, and as a priest in 1874. In 1874 he was appointed curate of St Peter's Church, Glenelg, under Canon Field, remaining there for two years.

He was at Melrose for five years 1875 to 1878?, servicing the townships of Laura, Jamestown, Gladstone, Georgetown and Port Pirie. Port Augusta was later added to his responsibilities. He resigned the incumbency in 1879 and was assigned to St Jude's, Brighton. He resigned that cure in 1881, expecting a transfer to Melbourne but was sent instead to Hobart, Tasmania, where he relieved Canon Bailey at the St. John the Baptist Church on Goulburn Street. While there, in 1882, a sermon he gave criticising an article in The Mercury brought an intemperate response from that newspaper. Williams returned to South Australia shortly afterwards, accepting an invitation to serve as the first incumbent of the Church of the Holy Cross in Mount Gambier.

In 1884 he founded a high school for boys in Doughty Terrace, Mount Gambier, at which many of the town's future leaders were educated. The existing grammar school closed soon after, and its principal, Richard Newstead Hobart (c. 1835–1898), joined with Williams as second master. The Rev. Donald Kerr was another recruit to the school's teaching staff. One of Hartley's students at this time was Oswald Rishbeth, who would go on to be an academic classicist and pioneer of academic geography.

Holy Cross Church closed in 1888 and Williams resigned the ministry around the same time. His exodus from Holy Cross Church, and perhaps from the Church of England, may have been a consequence of friction between himself and church authorities. He was of the High Church tradition, dogmatic and outspoken in his views. He no doubt took the classes in Latin, of which he was a considerable scholar.

His school closed in 1903 after Williams sustained injuries doing home repairs, and he left Mount Gambier a few years later. The building was for a time used as a private hospital, then may have been used as a girls' school.

He moved to Naracoorte or Bordertown and may have been involved with a political organisation.

He died at the Grange.

== Other interests ==
Williams was an enthusiastic sportsman: he excelled at cricket (he was an umpire in the early days of the Adelaide Oval), boxing and rowing. In his later hears he was fond of angling and gardening.

In 1902 he was appointed (honorary) Inspector of Fisheries for the River Glenelg, where he had a residence.

He was for some time a close friend of Canons Samuel Green (c. 1842–1904), James Pollitt (1813–1881) and F. Slaney Poole (c. 1846–1936).

== Family ==
Williams married Emma Jane Moorhouse (1850 – 21 December 1895) of Melrose on 10 October 1871 at the Church of the Holy Trinity, Melrose. Their children, many of whom used "Hartley-Williams" as though it were a surname, included:

- Maude Eveline Hartley Williams (1872 – 1942) married Harry De Neufville Lucas (1869 – 1959) on 18 October 1913.
- Charles Hartley Williams (1874 – 1965) married Elime Matilda Pries (1884 – 1973) in Busselton, Western Australia on 1 October 1914. He and Algeric Williams traded at Northam as "Williams Brothers".

- Margaret Hartley Williams lived in Western Australia.

- Daniel Frank Hartley Williams (1875 – )
- (Mary) Beryl Hartley Williams (1877 – 1970) married Robert Renfrew Murdoch (1868 – 1938) on 1 December 1900.

- Mary Beryl Hartley Murdoch (1903 – ) was the first wife of Alexander Sverjensky.

- Muriel Hartley Williams (1878 – 1889)
- Ethelberga Hartley "Berga" Williams (1880 – 1963), often mis-spelled "Ethelburga", married Lionel Edward Francis Despard (c.1858 – 1928) of Renmark on 25 September 1906. She married again, to Ernest Malcolm French (1869 – 1947) on 9 February 1932.
- Algeric Hartley "Eric" Williams (c.1882 – 1976) married Gladys Eleanor Prockter (1884 – 1959) of Toodyay on 29 July 1912, and moved to Western Australia.
- Irene Hartley Williams (1884 – )
- Grace Nona Hartley Williams (1886 – ) married Lt-Col. John Ewen McPherson at Eastbourne, Sussex on 23 February 1916, and remained in England.
- Montagu Hartley Williams (1889 – 1959) married Phyllis Maud Claridge (1897 – 1987) on 27 December 1924, and lived at Cowell, South Australia.
