= Richard Francis Newland =

Australian banker and politician (died 1873)

Richard Francis Newland (died 1 August 1873) was a banker and politician in the colony of South Australia, appointed as an acting non-official member of the Legislative Council of South Australia, serving from January 1847 to July 1847.

== History ==
Newland was manager of the Sydney branch of the Bank of Australasia and in January 1839 was appointed to the same position at the Adelaide branch of the Bank. He resigned in 1843, and at the urging of Hon. John Baker took up a sheep station either on the River Gilbert or the River Light, where he had a flock of 12,000 sheep, whose wool commanded record prices.

He was appointed to the Legislative Council in January 1847 while John Morphett was absent on leave. He succeeded Samuel Davenport as appointed non-official member of the Legislative Council.

In 1850 he succeeded G. F. Dashwood as Stipendiary and Special Magistrate at Port Adelaide.

In 1860 he left Adelaide for England aboard the Young Australian. In 1862 he was employed there as Assistant Emigration Officer and promoted to Emigration Officer in 1863. Again, he was following Dashwood, who had a similar position from 1858 to 1862. He gave evidence before a Royal Commission on the migration of troublesome convicts from Western Australia to South Australia, and the effect on the crime rate.

He died at the Rectory at Witnesham, near Ipswich, the home of his brother Rev. ?? Newland.

== Other activities ==
- He was a member of the Adelaide board of the South Australian Banking Company, the others being George Morphett and E. I. S. Trimmer; the Adelaide manager being Edward Stephens.
- He was a board member of the South Australian (Anglican) Church Building Society, founded 1839.
- He was a member of the Destitute Board in 1860.

== Recognition ==
Lake Newland was named for him by his friend and travelling companion Edward John Eyre during his 1839 expeditions.

== Family ==
He married Eleanor Light ( – 7 November 1851) on 14 December 1842. Their family included:

- Eleanor Amy (24 September 1843 – 9 March 1844)
- Eleanor Constance (22 February 1846 – 9 November 1866), died at West Hove, Brighton, South Australia.

They lived for some time in "The Grange", formerly the residence of Captain Sturt.

Relationship (if any) to Simpson Newland (1835–1925) MHA for Electoral district of Encounter Bay from 1881 to 1887 and his son Victor Marra Newland (1876–1953) MHA for Electoral district of North Adelaide from 1933 to 1938 has not been established, and a close relationship is most unlikely. Simpson Newland was a Congregationalist and son of Rev. Ridgway William Newland whereas R. F. Newland was an Anglican and brother of an Anglican clergyman. See Political families of South Australia.
