= John Cowan (Australian politician) =

South Australian politician (1866–1953)

The Honourable Sir John Cowan
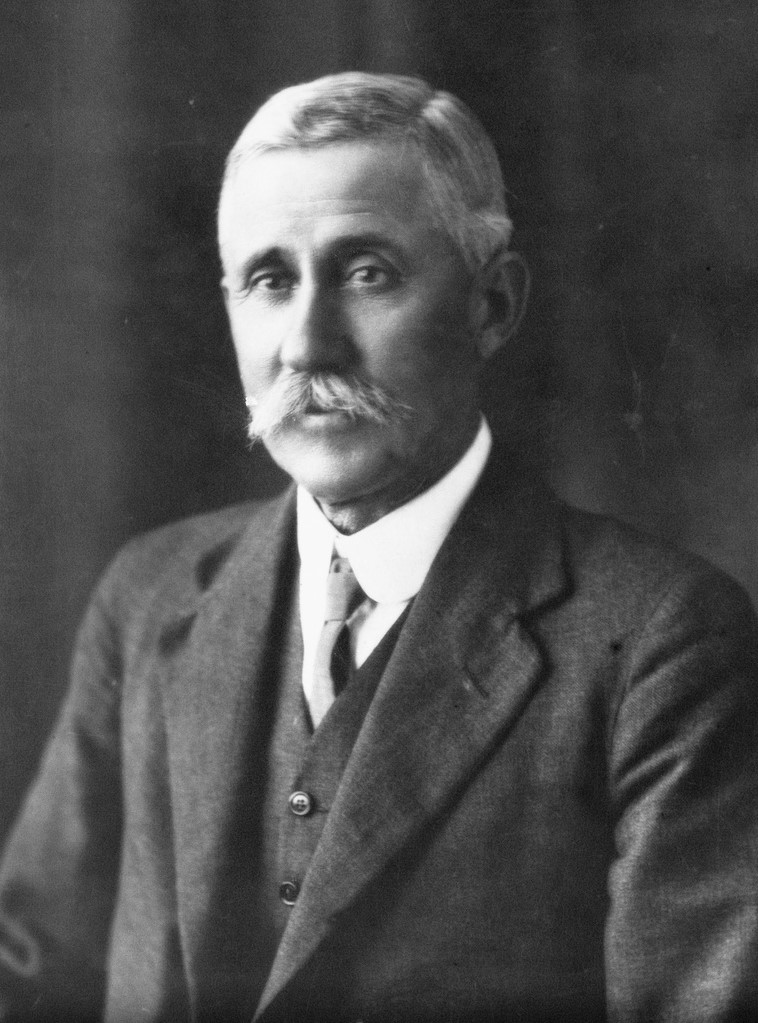

Member for the Southern District

Member of the South Australian Legislative Council
- In office 2 April 1910 – 29 February 1944

Personal details
- Born: 6 December 1866 Port Gawler, South Australia
- Died: 8 March 1953 (aged 86) Murray Bridge, South Australia
- Party: Liberal and Country League
- Spouse: Elizabeth Jones
- Relations: Thomas Cowan (father); James Cowan (uncle); John Lancelot Cowan (son); Darcy R.W. Cowan (first cousin)
- Children: 2 sons, 3 daughters
- Education: Whinham College
- Occupation: Pastoralist, parliamentarian

Sir John Cowan (6 December 1866 – 8 March 1953) was a South Australian politician who served as a member of the South Australian Legislative Council from 1910 to 1944.

== Early life ==
Cowan who was born at Port Gawler, South Australia, was the third son of Thomas Cowan, a farmer, and his wife Mary Jane, née Armstrong. He was educated at Whinham College in North Adelaide. After completion of his schooling, he managed a property owned by his father at Milang, South Australia. In 1881, Cowan purchased land near Murray Bridge, South Australia which he would develop and retain until his death. In 1892, Cowan married Elizabeth Jones with whom he had two sons and three daughters.

== Political career ==
Cowan served as a councillor on the District Council of Mobilong from 1892 to 1912 including the role of chairman from 1896 to 1912. He was elected to the Legislative Council district of the Southern District on 2 April 1910 and held this seat until his retirement on 29 February 1944. Cowan served as the Minister of Agriculture, the Assistant Minister of Repatriation and the Minister of Town Planning in the government led by Henry Barwell and as the Minister of Agriculture, the Minister of Immigration, the Minister of Repatriation, and the Minister of Irrigation in the government led by Richard Layton Butler. He also served as the Government Whip in the Legislative Council for a period of 20 years and as a member of the Parliamentary Standing Committee on Public Works from 12 July 1934 to 31 May 1944.

== Later life and death ==
He rode a hack around his property Glen Lossie near Murray Bridge, up until his death on 8 March 1953 (aged 86) and was survived by his wife Elizabeth and their children.

== Honours ==
His contribution to public life was recognised with the conferral of the prefix 'Honourable' on 7 August 1930 and a Knight Bachelor on 1 January 1944.

== See also ==
- Australian knights and dames
