= Thomas Field (Anglican priest, born 1829) =

English Anglican priest (1829–1899)

Thomas Field (30 December 1829 – 29 September 1899), frequently referred to as Canon Field, was an Anglican priest born in London, who had a substantial career in the colony of South Australia.

== History ==
Field was born in London, a son of John Field (24 Jan 1799 – 10 Jan 1845) and Elizabeth Field, née Loat (c. 1801 – 2 March 1880), of Balham, Surrey, and entered King's College, London, gaining his associate diploma in 1849. He then studied at Emmanuel College, Cambridge, where he took the BA degree in 1854 and the M.A. degree in 1857. In 1855 he was ordained deacon, and priest the following year. He served as curate of the church St. Giles Reading from 1855 to 1857, and the church at Petersfield, Hants. from 1857 to 1861 and at Petworth, Sussex from 1861 to 1862.

Rev. and Mrs. Field emigrated to South Australia on the Orient, arriving in August 1862. His first charge was the sparsely inhabited Broughton district, based at G. C. Hawker's Bungaree station, north of Clare. From 1865 to 1881 he was incumbent of St. Peter's, Glenelg, followed by two years at Hindmarsh.

In November 1869 he and the pregnant Mrs. Field left for England on the City of Adelaide. Revs. H. Howitt and H. J. Poole relieving, returning by the Columbus in May 1871. In 1874, assisted by his curate Hartley Williams, he married his oldest brother John Lyon Field to his sister-in-law Caroline Bentham Neales.

He relieved Rev. H. M. Pollitt at All Saints' Church, Hindmarsh from 1881 to 1883. A feature of his acting incumbency was the opening of the new organ, with demonstrations by the usual organist Jaffray Bruer, Arthur Boult of St. Peter's Cathedral and Miss Goodman of Geelong, Victoria. From 1883 to 1885 he served as assistant missionary supply chaplain, which position entailed relieving clergy in various localities throughout the colony.

In 1885 he had charge of both St Cuthbert's in Prospect, and St. Ninian's at Islington, then St. Ninian's and St. Cyprian's Mission Church, Melbourne Street, North Adelaide. From 1892 to 1894 he was chaplain to the Adelaide Gaol, and had the unenviable duty of accompanying the murderer William Brown to the scaffold. He then exchanged positions with Rev. Philip Richard Pymar Dodd, chaplain to the Destitute Asylum. It was during this time that he was elevated to the rank of Canon. He remained chaplain of the Asylum and priest in charge of St Cyprian's Mission Church until struck by the illness —influenza— which resulted in his death.

The funeral service was held at St. Cyprian's and he was buried at the North-road Cemetery.

== Other activities ==
Rev. Field was deeply involved in education: while at Broughton he built a Church school; at Glenelg he established a day school and saw the commencement of the new church building. He built a new classroom at Hindmarsh, and a schoolroom at St. Cyprian's. He acted as examiner at St. Peter's College.

He was also involved in the Sunday-school Union since its foundation in 1878, acting as its first secretary, and for some time as a board member.

In 1885 Field and Frank Dobbs opened the Adelaide Collegiate School' on Barton Terrace, North Adelaide for the Anglican Church. Dobbs retired in 1889 and was succeeded by the Rev. H. A. Brookshank. In 1891 it was purchased by J. H. Lindon and G. L. Heinemann and became The Queen's School, later Queen's College.

== Family ==
Thomas Field married Mary Whicher (died 29 September 1865) in England. He married again, to Elizabeth Bentham Neales (c. 1843 – 28 May 1933) on 5 November 1867. She was the eldest daughter of J. Bentham Neales, MP. Their children were:

- Mary Whicher Field (21 April 1863 – )
- Edith Whicher Field (5 May 1865 – 27 June 1865)
- (Margaret) Laura Field (1868 – )
- Gertrude Elizabeth Bentham Field (26 April 1870 – ) (born in England)
- (Thomas) Ernest Field (16 July 1874 – )
- (Constance) Ruby Field (15 April 1876 – )
- Harry Bentham Field (8 June 1878 – )
- Bessie Williams Field (2 March 1880 – 31 December 1975) married Samuel Gallie Phillips on 25 May 1911 in Claremont WA

Their home for the last twenty years or so was at Barton Terrace, North Adelaide.

Oldest brother John Lyon Field (1826–1911) came out to Adelaide, married Caroline Neales (23 February 1848 – ) on 3 June 1873, 2nd daughter of J. B. Neales and returned to England, lived at "The Poplars", Addlestone, Surrey. They had a son on 20 July 1877.
