= James Cowan (South Australian politician) =

Australian politician

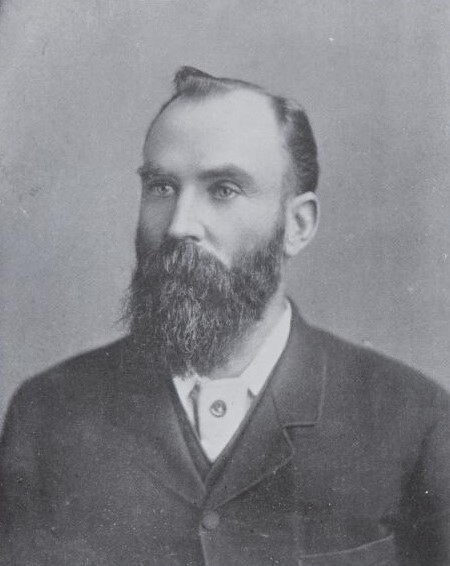
- Born: 21 April 1848; County Tyrone, Ireland (now Northern Ireland)
- Died: 21 July 1890 (aged 42); Dry Creek, South Australia
- Education: North Adelaide Grammar School
- Occupations: Farmer, flour miller, investor
- Spouse: Sarah Ann Warren
- Children: Henry Albert Cowan (1875–1964), William James Trafford Cowan (1877–1956), Horace Stanhope Cowan (1879–1945), Frank Gladstone Cowan (1881–1966), Leslie Thompson Cowan (1883–1968), Darcy Rivers Warren Cowan (1885–1958), George Dalrymple Cowan (1887–1963), Gladys Rosalind Lewis O.B.E. (1890–1954)
- Relatives: Thomas Cowan (brother); John Cowan (nephew); John Lancelot Cowan (great nephew); James Cowan (great grandson); Essington Lewis (son-in-law)

Member for Yatala
- In office 23 Apr 1890 – 21 Jul 1890 Serving with William Gilbert
- Preceded by: Josiah Bagster
- Succeeded by: Richard Butler
- Constituency: Yatala

Member of the South Australian House of Assembly

James Cowan (21 April 1848 – 21 July 1890), flour miller and investor, had been a member of the South Australian House of Assembly for the Yatala for only 2 months when he was killed in an accident at a railway crossing. Cowan was an early investor in BHP. The property associated with Erindale, Cowan's residence at Burnside, was sub-divided after his death into a new suburb which was also named Erindale.

== Early life ==
Cowan who was born in County Tyrone, Ireland (now Northern Ireland), was the third son of John Cowan, a ploughman and shepherd, and his wife Margaret, née Lammey. Cowan, his parents and four other siblings immigrated to South Australia (SA), arriving in Adelaide on 3 August 1852. The family initially settled in North Adelaide where Cowan attended the North Adelaide Grammar School. When he reached the age of 14, he left to assist with his father's businesses in Two Wells (39 km north of Adelaide).

== Business career ==
After starting his working life as a farmer, grazier and machinist in the mid-1860s, Cowan began a career as a flour miller. He later purchased the Two Wells mill and later expanded his operations to include mills at Gladstone, Quorn, Mallala and Allendale North and wharfs at Port Pirie and Port Augusta. He later merged all of these assets with those of others to form the South Australian Milling Company in which he was a major shareholder. The economic depression that affected South Australia in the early 1880s forced Cowan to assign his estate. About 1885, his fortunes improved when he became one of the early investors in BHP via the agency of his wife's brothers-in-law, William Wilson and S. Wilson. He was able to resume investing with a focus on agriculture and mining. At the time of his death, his portfolio included J. Hill & Company (coaching), the Australian Refining and Smelting Company, the Hamley Copper Mining Company, the Moonta and Wallaroo Copper Mining Company, the Bridgeport Coal Company, the General Electric Supply Company of Australia, Ballarat Tramway Company as well as a number of farms and other property holdings.

== Political career ==
Cowan had considered requests to stand for election to parliament at the two previous general elections. When the 1890 election was announced, Cowan nominated for the Electorate District of Yatala whose previous members included his eldest brother, Thomas. On 23 April 1890, he and William Gilbert were elected to the two vacancies for Yatala. Just after 5.00 pm on 21 July 1890, Cowan and his fellow passenger, Mark Bullimore, the local branch manager of the General Electric Supply Company of Australia, were both killed when a train collided with his horse-drawn buggy at the intersection of Grand Junction Road and the main railway line running north from Adelaide in the suburb of Dry Creek. His funeral at Payneham on 23 July 1890 was attended by a large number of mourners including his extended family, friends and business associates, and members from both houses of the South Australian Parliament. The vacancy in Yatala caused by Cowan's death was filled by Richard Butler who had unsuccessfully stood earlier in 1890.

== Personal life ==
Cowan married Sarah Ann Warren, the eldest daughter of Henry Warren & Annie Topham at Two Wells on 27 November 1873. They had eight children including Darcy Rivers Warren Cowan, who is notable as a medical practitioner, and Gladys Rosalind Lewis, OBE who is notable both for her marriage to Essington Lewis and her community service. After his death, Cowan's widow and eight children remained at the property in the Adelaide suburb of Burnside that he had purchased in 1889 and had renamed Erindale. In 1912, the property was sold and sub-divided into a new suburb which was named Erindale.

== See also ==
- Crown Point Station
- Members of the South Australian House of Assembly, 1890–1893
- Political families of South Australia
- Railway accidents in South Australia
