= Alexander Sverjensky =

Alexander Sverjensky Александр Борисович Сверженский
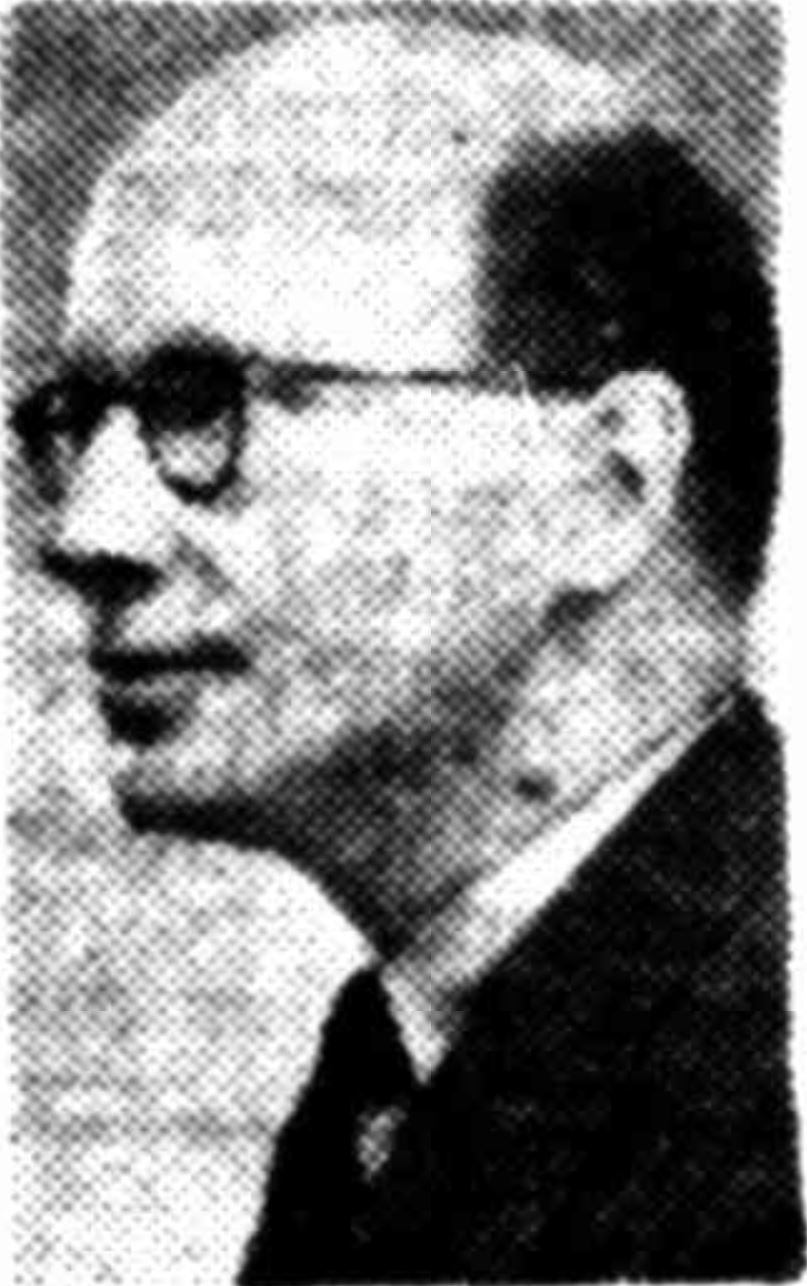
- Alexander Sverjensky, 1945

Background information
- Born: 26 March 1901; Riga, Latvia
- Died: 3 October 1971 (aged 70) Bondi Beach, Sydney, Australia
- Genres: Classical music
- Occupation: Pianist
- Instrument: Piano

Alexander Borisovich Sverjensky (Александр Борисович Сверженский) (26 March 1901 – 3 October 1971) was a Russian-born Australian pianist and teacher.

Sverjensky was born in Riga, Latvia, then part of the Russian Empire, in 1901. He started piano lessons at age 12. From age 14, he studied at the Petrograd Conservatory under Alexander Glazunov. (Some sources say he studied under Sergei Rachmaninoff or Alexander Siloti.) He also studied law at Tomsk.

In 1922 he left Russia for China. He accompanied the soprano Lydia Lipkovska on a tour of China, Japan, the Philippines, Australia and New Zealand, and then appeared as a soloist in Europe. He decided to settle permanently in Australia in 1925. He appeared in many recitals and concerts throughout the 1920s and 1930s. He was the first person to play the music of Sergei Prokofiev in Australia, and also championed other Russian composers such as Igor Stravinsky, Alexander Scriabin, Nikolai Medtner, Mily Balakirev, Glazunov and Rachmaninoff. He was naturalised a British subject in 1930. He first started appearing as a soloist with the ABC Sydney Orchestra (forerunner of the Sydney Symphony Orchestra) in 1933, and he founded his own chamber music trio in 1936. He was the first pianist to play Rachmaninoff's Piano Concerto No. 3 in D minor with the Sydney Symphony Orchestra, in 1941 under Percy Code.

From 1938 he became a piano teacher at the New South Wales Conservatorium of Music, and had a profound influence on a generation of Australian and New Zealand pianists and their own students. These included Nancy Salas, Malcolm Williamson, Larry Sitsky, Romola Costantino, Roger Woodward, Richard Farrell, Stephanie McCallum, Anne Harvey (mother of Michael Kieran Harvey), Neta Maughan (mother and teacher of Tamara Anna Cislowska), Daniel Herscovitch, Julie Adam, Grant Foster, Rhondda Gillespie, Robert Weatherburn, Tamás Ungár, David Miller, Helen Quach, Alison Bauld, Garry Laycock, Pamela Sverjensky, Suzanne Cooper, Julia Brimo, Vladimir Pleshakov, Helen Priestner Edmonds and Edward Theodore. He retired from his teaching position in 1969.

Alexander Sverjensky was married three times. First was Mary Murdoch in 1927; they divorced in 1943. Two months later he married Enith Clarke, a piano teacher. They divorced in 1951, and a month later he married Isla Draper.

He died in Sydney on 3 October 1971, survived by his third wife and two sons (one from his first marriage).

The National Library of Australia holds a collection of his programs and other papers.

== Sources ==
- Australian Dictionary of Biography
