= Nancy Salas =

Australian music teacher and musicologist

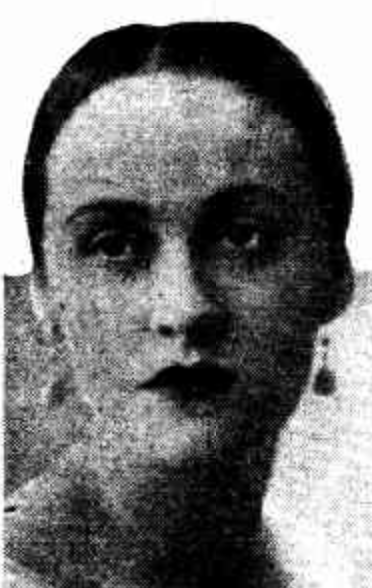
Nancy Salas, c.1935

Nancy Evelyn Salas MBE (28 July 1910 – 18 December 1990) was an Australian music teacher and musicologist.

== Early life ==
Salas was born in Coolgardie, Western Australia, to Annie (née Maguire) and Godfrey Dowling Salas. Her father was of Hungarian descent.

== Career ==
Salas learned piano from a teacher in Kalgoorlie, and gained her licentiate in music from Trinity College London in 1929. She moved to Sydney in 1934 and began working as a music teacher, from 1938 also studying under Alexander Sverjensky at the New South Wales State Conservatorium of Music. Salas was appointed to the staff of the conservatorium in 1955, teaching piano and harpsichord. She performed both the instruments with the Sydney Symphony Orchestra, under conductor Eugene Goossens, and also made recordings for the Australian Broadcasting Commission (ABC).

A devotee of Béla Bartók, Salas formed the Bartók Society of Australia in 1955, and in 1963 went to Hungary to study his archives, meeting with his widow, Ditta Pásztory-Bartók. She was also interested in Baroque music, undertaking research with Gustav Leonhardt and Ralph Kirkpatrick, and the music of Karlheinz Stockhausen. In 1979, Salas and a pupil, Kathryn Selby, performed in front of the United Nations General Assembly in New York as part of a concert to celebrate the International Year of the Child. She retired from the conservatorium the following year. Salas received several honours during her career. She was appointed a Member of the Order of the British Empire (MBE) in 1977. She also received the Queen Elizabeth II Silver Jubilee Medal, and also received medals from the Hungarian and West German governments.

== Personal life ==
Salas was married twice, first to Halford Oldershaw in 1942; they divorced in 1955. The following year, Salas married Victor Coleman; they would divorce in 1971. She had no children by either marriage. Salas died in Sydney in 1990, aged 80.

== Notable Students ==
Ray Hartley OAM (1925-2014) was a world-class Australian pianist, composer, arranger and philanthropist; he was awarded the Medal of the Order of Australia for his fund-raising concerts in the U.S.A. and Australia, and performed at the Sydney Opera House in 1994.
