= Members of the South Australian Legislative Council, 1843–1851 =

This is a list of members of the South Australian Legislative Council from 1843 to 1851. Beginning with the Royal Instructions gazetted 15 June 1843, there were four official and four non-official members of the legislative council consisting of: the governor, colonial secretary, advocate-general, and registrar-General with four non-official members being nominated by the Crown. The council was the only chamber of government until the House of Assembly was created in 1857.

Name	Office	Term
Charles Hervey Bagot	Non-Official	1844–1853; 1857–61; 1865–69
William Bartley	Advocate-General (acting) ^{[a]}	1849
George Frederick Dashwood	Non-Official	1843–1844
Samuel Davenport	Non-Official	1846–1848; 1855–56; 1857–66
Boyle Travers Finniss	Registrar-General	1847–1857
George Grey	Governor & Resident Commissioner	1841–1845
Jacob Hagen	Non-Official	1843–1846; 1847–1851
Richard Davies Hanson	Advocate-General (acting) ^{[c]}	1851, 1851–1857
James William MacDonald	Registrar-General (acting) ^{[b]}	1844–1846
John Morphett	Non-Official	1843–1847; 1848–1855; 1857–73
Alfred Mundy	Colonial Secretary	1843–1849
Richard Francis Newland	Non-Official (acting)	1847
Thomas Shuldham O'Halloran	Non-Official	1843–1851
Frederick Robe	Governor	1845–1848
William Smillie	Advocate-General	1840–1851
Charles Sturt	Registrar-General ^{[b]}	1839–1847
Charles Sturt	Colonial Secretary	1849–1851
Thomas Williams	Non-Official	1843
Henry Young	Governor	1848–1851

^{[a]} Bartley was acting while Smillie was on leave 1849
^{[b]} Sturt was absent exploring 1844–1845, MacDonald acted
^{[c]} Hanson was acting while Smillie was on leave 1851
