= Enith Clarke =

Australian pianist

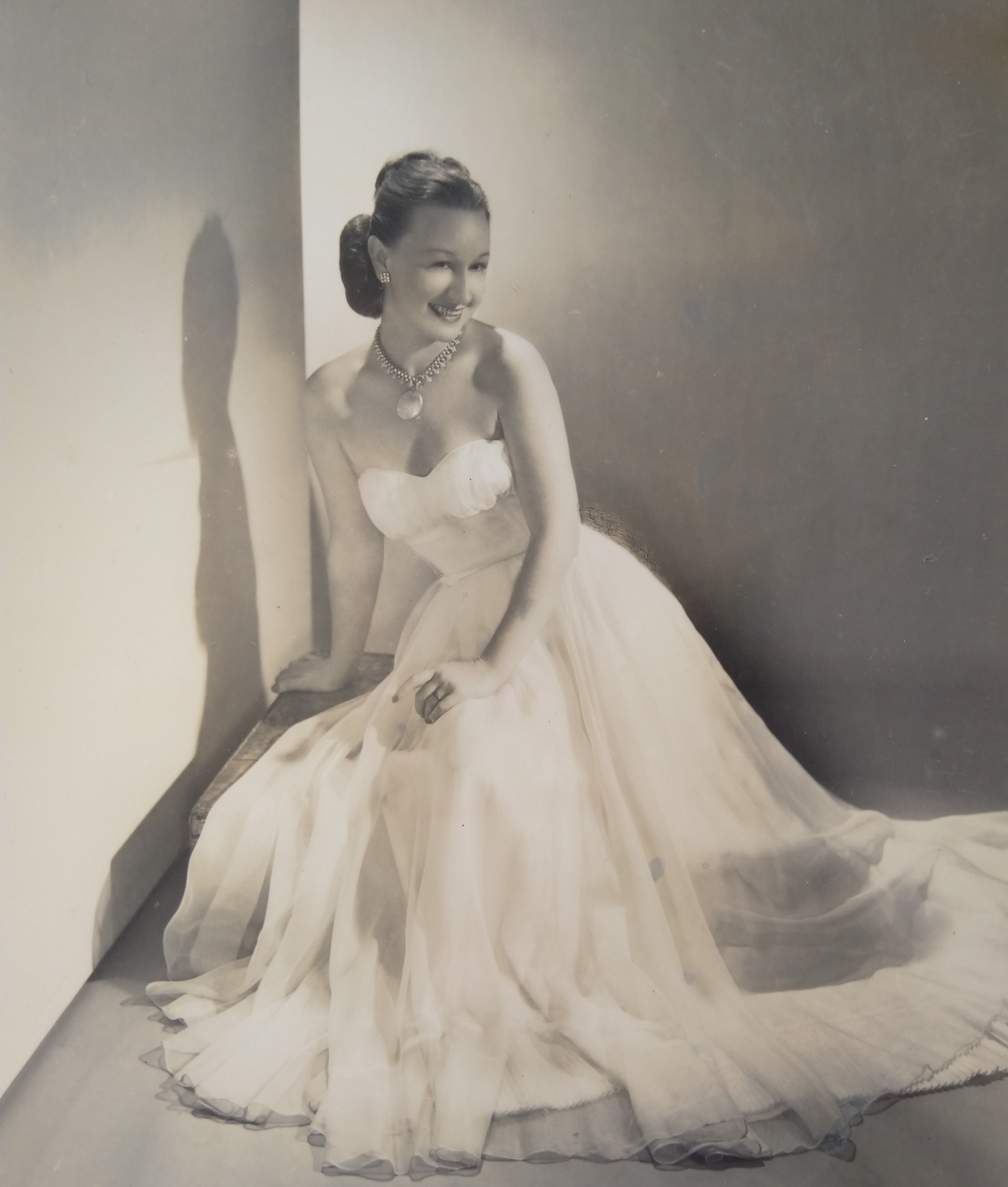

Background information
- Born: Kathleen Eileen Doris Enith Clarke; 1911; Rockhampton
- Died: 1995 (aged 83–84)

Kathleen Eileen Doris Enith Clarke (1911–1995) was an Australian pianist, noted for achieving considerable critical success in the 1940s.

== Career ==
Born in Rockhampton, Queensland, Enith Clarke showed early promise as a teenager by achieving considerable local success in the piano categories at the annual Rockhampton Eisteddfod throughout the 1920s and early 1930s. Later in her career, Clarke returned to the Rockhampton Eisteddfod and donated a special prize for the open piano section as a way to show her appreciation for the event that helped start her career.

In Rockhampton, Clarke received piano lessons from acclaimed local music teacher and soprano Florence A Sandberg, who herself was a former student of noted Czech-born violinist Louis D'Hage.

Through successful examinations, Clarke achieved Associate in Music, Australia and the Associate of the London College of Music (ACLM) diplomas and her talents were soon receiving interest from the likes of Ignacy Jan Paderewski, Arthur Rubinstein and Wilhelm Backhaus.

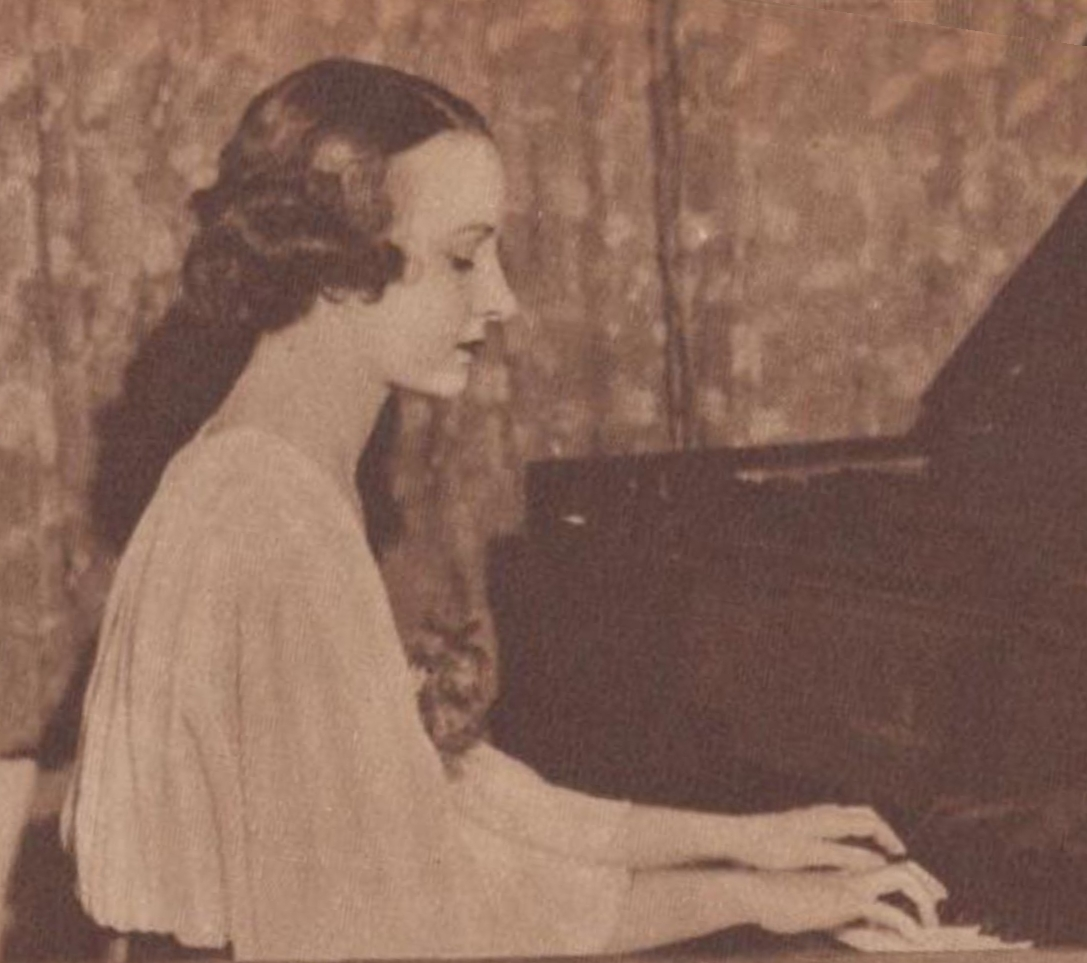
Enith Clarke performing a Mozart concerto for 3 pianos for the Australian Broadcasting Commission, 1936

In the early 1930s, Clarke relocated to Sydney to study under Russian-born pianist Alexander Sverjensky. During this time, Clarke also began performing with the ABC's live broadcasting orchestras on radio stations 4QG in Brisbane and 2BL in Sydney, marking the start of Clarke's long association with the Australian Broadcasting Commission.

Having been coached under Curt Prerauer and Maurice Abravanel with the ABC Orchestra, Clarke began an association with Alfred Hill during her time attending the Alfred Hill Academy of Music. Clarke made her concert debut on 21 July 1936 playing Liszt's Concerto in A major. Hill also arranged for Clarke to perform with Ernest Llewellyn for the first public performance of a sonata Hill had composed for violin and piano. Following her performance of Liszt's Concerto, Hill sent a letter to Rockhampton mayor Robert William Evans, in an attempt to "solicit" the assistance of the people of Rockhampton in helping Enith Clarke with her career as, according to Hill, she deserved all possible encouragement as she would prove to be a credit to her native city.

Enith Clarke's career peaked in the 1940s when she received mostly positive reviews of her work in the Sydney and Melbourne press, including from English critic Neville Cardus.

In 1948, at the suggestion of Claudio Arrau Clarke went overseas to further her studies, where she received daily three-hour lessons in Lausanne from Alfred Cortot, who praised Clarke's ability and technique. Clarke also received lessons from Walter Gieseking.

In 1948, Clarke said one of her biggest ambitions to have been realised was playing as a soloist with the Sydney Symphony Orchestra conducted by Eugene Goossens, who Clarke believed to be the best conductor in Australia. Goossens expressed his admiration for Clarke's piano playing.

== Personal life ==
Clarke was a daughter of English immigrants Charles and Susan Clarke (née Aplin) who had sailed to Australia on a year-long voyage from England, leaving in April 1887 and arriving in Rockhampton in April 1888, and marrying upon their arrival. Charles Clarke gained work in Rockhampton as a local butcher, owning his own business and retiring when he reached the age of 74. Enith Clarke's parents celebrated their 60th wedding anniversary in 1948.

Aside from music, Clarke was known for being a competent aircraft pilot, often using planes to visit friends on remote stations in rural areas.

Shooting and fencing were other known hobbies.

Clarke had a superstition of always having a gold horseshoe tied in a handkerchief while giving piano recitals.

=== Marriage to Sverjensky ===
In 1943, Clarke became engaged to her former teacher, Alexander Sverjensky, who had given her a scholarship after she arrived in Sydney.

The marriage between Clarke and Sverjensky came to an abrupt end when Svejensky filed for divorce in December 1950 after accusing Clarke of committing adultery with three different men during their marriage.

The three co-respondents originally named in the suit were Arthur Selwyn Hurd, former police officer Emil Norton Davis, and former Consul for Portugal Alvaro Brilhante Laborinho. Hurd denied the charge, and he was dismissed from the suit with Sverjensky ordered to pay his court costs.

Sverjensky was granted a decree nisi after the judge ruled that Clarke had committed adultery with Davis at Surfers Paradise in January 1946, and that Davis had also committed adultery. It was also found that Clarke had committed adultery with Laborinho in Sydney, in February 1948. However, the judge did not find that Laborinho had committed adultery with Clarke.

The evidence presented during the divorce case, including discussions about nude photos, a suspected pregnancy and letters containing references to a "sugar daddy", provided substantial material for the tabloid press including Sydney's The Sun.

== Later years ==
Following her public divorce, Clarke's piano playing career failed to reach the heights it did in the 1940s, and she spent some years teaching piano at schools in Sydney such as Abbotsleigh and Meriden throughout the 1960s and early 1970s, before returning to Queensland.

However, Clarke did travel overseas in 1952 to play background music in three films released by a French film company, and to appear on BBC Television.

Enith Clarke died in 1995.
