= Johann Sudholz =

Pioneer German colonist and Australian politician (1821–1903)

Johann Wilhelm Albrecht Sudholz (17 May 1821 – 7 November 1903), known as Albert, was a pioneer German colonist in the colony of South Australia. He was a sheep farmer and later a politician. He was a member of the South Australian House of Assembly from February to May 1875, representing the electorate of Murray.

== Early life ==
Johann Wilhelm Albrecht Sudholz was born on 17 May 1821 at Kirchdorf, Kingdom of Hanover (today Lower Saxony) in northwestern Germany.

== Career ==
Sudholz arrived at Port Adelaide in 1846 on the Heerjheebhoy Rustomjee Patel. He settled at Gilles Plains, where he became a successful farmer. He was one of the founders of the Bethlehem Lutheran Church in Flinders Street, Adelaide, was a member of the Church Council of the Australian Synod for many years, and was described upon his death as one of the "most prominent and whole-hearted members" of the Lutheran Church in Australia.

Sudholz was elected to the House of Assembly at the 1875 election, but was unseated by the Committee of Disputed Returns and disqualified from that term of parliament on 22 May for bribery and corruption, when it was found that his agents had run up a bill at the Angaston Hotel contrary to electoral law. He denied responsibility and stated that he had only paid the bill to avoid scandal, but the committee unanimously found against him. The decision was the subject of considerable local protest.

He later contested the 1893 election in the seat of Yatala, but was unsuccessful.

== Personal life ==
Sudholz was known as "Albert". In 1849 he married Catherine Gehlke, who was 21. They had 11 children.

== Death and legacy ==
Sudholz died on 7 November 1903 and was buried at Walkerville Wesleyan Cemetery in Walkerville, where the largest monument in the cemetery is mounted above his grave.

His wife and eight children survived him; seven of these were women who changed their surnames upon marriage, and a son, cited as "G. W. Sudholz, of Sydney" in a newspaper obituary in 1903. Georg Wilhelm Sudholz married Dorothea Isabella Ellenora von Bertouch, of Denmark, known as "Princess" Dora von Bertouch, who died in 1901 and was buried in the same plot as Johann (Albert) Sudholz.

Sudholz Road, which forms the eastern boundary of Gilles Plains, and Sudholz Place, in Flinders Street, Adelaide, were named in his honour.
