= John Ingleby (Australian politician) =

Australian politician

John Ingleby (22 February 1829 – 5 August 1907) was an Australian politician. He was a member of the South Australian House of Assembly from 1875 to 1877, representing the electorate of Victoria.

Ingleby was born in Staffordshire in England, and migrated to South Australia in 1849. He resided in the Mount Gambier region for nearly fifty years prior to his death, living for many years at Glenburnie before moving to Mount Gambier itself several years before his death. In business, he worked as a commission agent, auctioneer and stock broker in Mount Gambier. He was heavily involved in public life in the town, serving as a justice of the peace, as clerk of the Mount Gambier Local Court and clerk of the District Council of Mount Gambier East, as a member of the original committee of the Mount Gambier Institute, and as master of the Mount Gambier Freemason lodge. His brother, Rupert Ingleby, was a prominent Adelaide lawyer who had migrated two years before him.

He was elected to the House of Assembly at the 1875 election, but resigned after only two years, stating that he preferred to focus on campaigning for the division of pastoral lands into smaller properties than carrying out the duties of a member of parliament. His brother Rupert nominated for the resulting by-election, but was very narrowly defeated by Lavington Glyde.

He died in 1907, aged 78, at "Inglehurst", his Mount Gambier home. He had been in good health until about nine months before his death.
