= Charles Beaumont Howard =

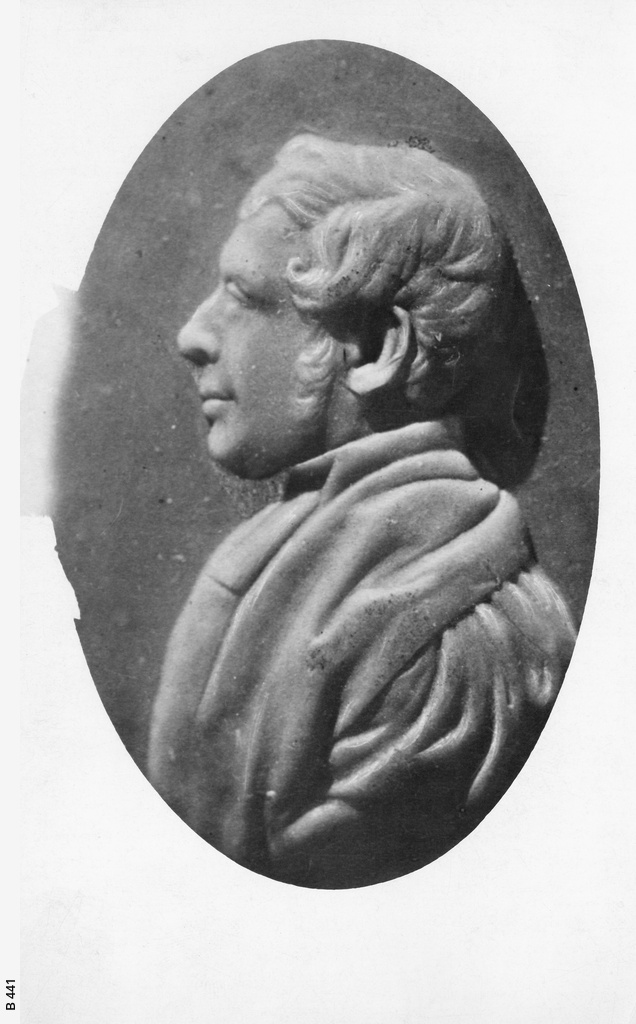
Reverend Charles Beaumont Howard

Charles Beaumont Howard (1807 – 19 July 1843) was a colonial clergyman in South Australia.

Howard was born in St Peter's Parish, Dublin, Ireland, the son of William Howard, a lieutenant in the Dublin City Corps of the Liberty Rangers. Howard graduated from Trinity College, Dublin with an M.A. in 1836.

Howard was ordained as a deacon in the Anglican Church of Ireland.

Two of Howard's daughters were married at Trinity Church by the Bishop of Adelaide assisted by Farrell (stepfather of the brides) on 22 December 1857. The second daughter, Isabel Barbara Howard, married John Williams and the third daughter, Henrietta Hindmarsh Howard, married Morley Caulfield Saunders.
