= Thomas Cowan (South Australian politician) =

Australian politician

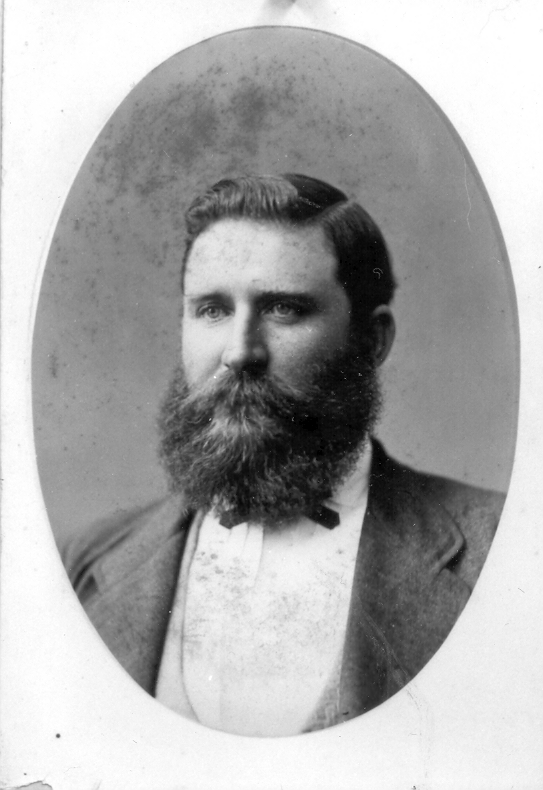

Member of the South Australian House of Assembly for Yatala
- In office 17 May 1875 – 15 April 1878

Personal details
- Born: 5 December 1839 County Tyrone, Ireland (now Northern Ireland)
- Died: 14 September 1890 (aged 50) Milang, South Australia
- Spouse: Mary Jane Armstrong
- Relations: James Cowan (brother); John Cowan (son); John Lancelot Cowan (grandson)
- Children: 5 sons and 2 daughters
- Occupation: Farmer, Publican

Thomas Cowan (5 December 1839 – 14 September 1890) served one term as a member of the South Australian House of Assembly for the Electoral district of Yatala.

== Early life ==
Cowan who was born in County Tyrone, Ireland (now Northern Ireland), was the eldest son of John Cowan, a ploughman and shepherd, and his wife Margaret, née Lammey. Cowan, his parents and four younger siblings emigrated to South Australia, arriving in Adelaide on 3 August 1852. The family initially settled in North Adelaide where Cowan assisted his father with a horse-drawn taxi business operating between North Adelaide and Adelaide. His father later purchased property at Two Wells (39 km north of Adelaide) where Cowan assisted with the operation of several businesses including a farm, a tavern and a post office. Cowan later started farming in the Two Wells area.

== Political career ==
Cowan served on the District Council of Port Gawler as a councillor from 1868 to 1872 and as the chairman from 1873 to 1875.

In 1875, Cowan was one of three candidates nominated for the two member district of Yatala, however his nomination papers were declared informal. The candidates declared elected, Wentworth Cavenagh and Lavington Glyde, resigned in order to hold an election at which Cavenagh and Cowan were successful. Cowan did not re-stand for election in 1878.

== Late life ==
During the 1880s, Cowan encountered business difficulties and was on the verge of becoming insolvent. Cowan considered re-standing for the Electoral district of Yalata when a vacancy was created in July 1890 by the death of James Cowan, his younger brother who was one of the two current sitting members. Cowan was nominated but later stood down for medical reasons. The vacancy was subsequently filled by Richard Butler who had unsuccessfully stood for the seat earlier in 1890.

Cowan died on 14 September 1890 at Milang, pre-deceased by his wife who died in June 1890 and survived by his five sons including John who would also serve as a South Australian parliamentarian, and one daughter.

== See also ==
- Members of the South Australian House of Assembly, 1875–1878
