= Darcy Rivers Warren Cowan =

Australian doctor

Sir Darcy Cowan
- Born: 8 August 1885; Norwood, South Australia, Australia
- Died: 9 June 1958 (aged 72); North Adelaide, South Australia, Australia
- Resting place: Payneham Cemetery
- Occupation: physician
- Spouse: Effie Hewitt Cox (1886–1971) grand daughter of William Doudy
- Children: no children
- Parent(s): James Cowan and Sarah Ann, née Warren

Sir Darcy Rivers Warren Cowan (8 August 1885 – 9 June 1958) was an Australian medical practitioner and advocate of effective treatment of tuberculosis.

== Family ==
The sixth of seven sons of James Cowan and Sarah Ann (née Warren) and brother of Gladys Rosalind Lewis.

He married Effie Hewitt Cox, grand daughter of William Doudy, on 19 April 1910 at the home of his brother-in-law Alfred von Doussa, at Hahndorf, South Australia, Australia. They had no children.

== Education and career ==
Cowan attended Prince Alfred College and the University of Adelaide.

Cowan was in England at the start of World War I. Darcy served in the Royal Army Medical Corps and later the Australian Army Medical Corps Reserve as an honorary captain.

He championed the effective treatment of tuberculosis, including the use of Bacillus Calmette-Guérin vaccine.

He championed the establishment of Bedford Industries Inc, focusing on the rehabilitation of those afflicted with tuberculosis and also worked with the James Brown Memorial Trust which owned and managed Kalyra Sanatorium and Estcourt House, Grange.

He was knighted in 1955 in "recognition of service to medicine." He was a member of the Adelaide Club and a life member of the British Medical Association. The Australian Laennec Society commemorated him by the Sir Darcy Cowan prize for research into respiratory disease.
