= John Lancelot Cowan =

Australian politician

John Cowan
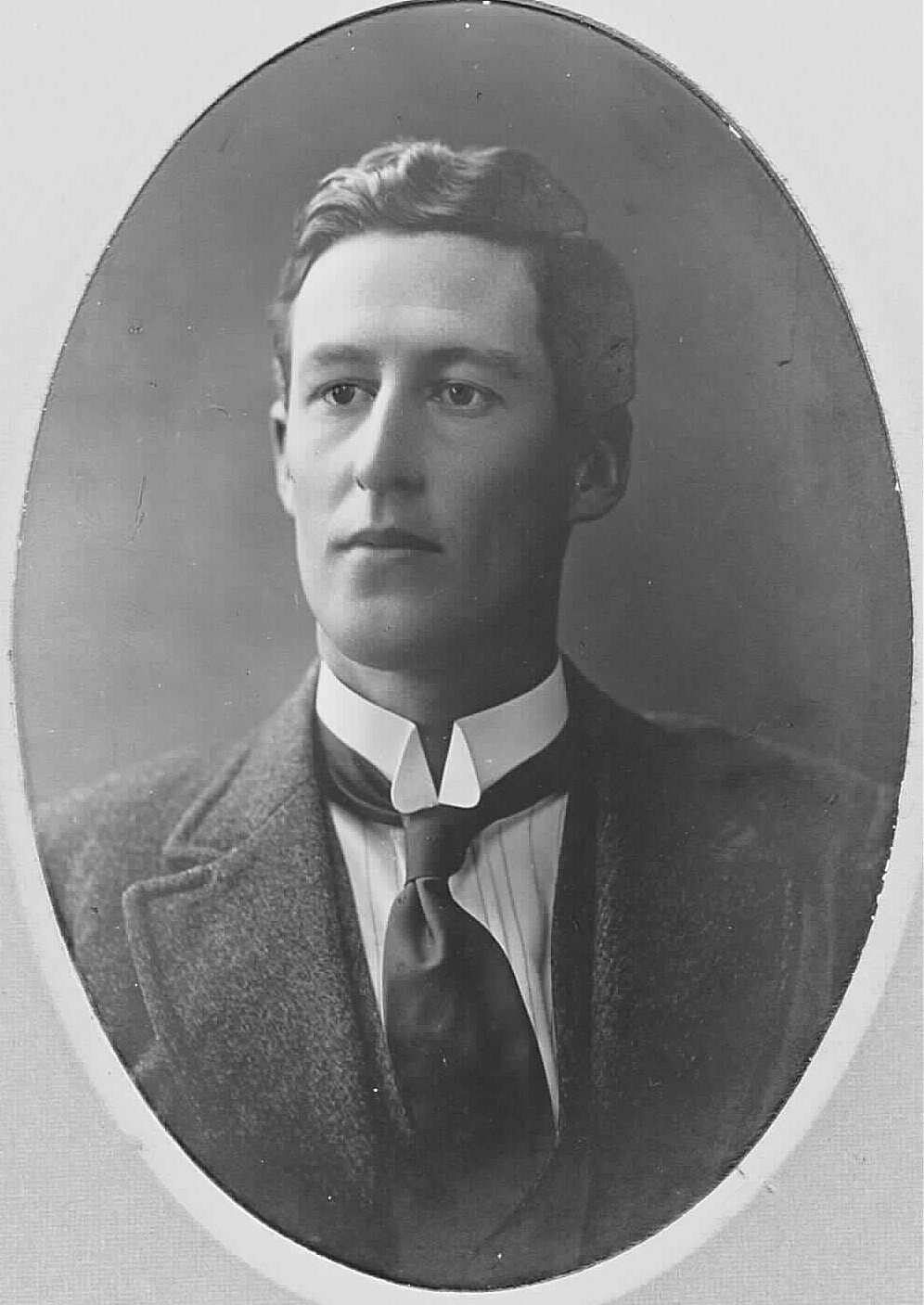

Member for Southern District

Member of the South Australian Legislative Council
- In office May 26, 1949 – March 6, 1959

Personal details
- Born: August 14, 1893 Murray Bridge, South Australia
- Died: May 19, 1971 (aged 77) Adelaide, South Australia
- Party: Liberal and Country League
- Spouse: Florence Annie Maud Yates
- Relations: Thomas Cowan (grandfather); James Cowan (great-uncle); John Cowan (father)
- Children: 2 sons and 2 daughter
- Education: Prince Alfred College
- Occupation: Farmer

John Lancelot Cowan (14 August 1893 – 19 May 1971) served as one of the 4 members for the District of Southern Districts in the South Australian Legislative Council from 26 May 1949 to 28 February 1959.

== Early life ==
Cowan who was born in Murray Bridge, South Australia, was the eldest son of John Cowan, a pastoralist and parliamentarian, and his wife Elizabeth, née Jones. He was educated at Prince Alfred College and served in the First Australian Imperial Force. In 1920, Cowan married Florence Yates.

== Political career ==
Cowan served as a councillor on the District Council of Mobilong from 1927 to 1949, and was chairman of the council from 1932 to 1949. He also served as the President of the Local Government Association of South Australia. In 1944, he unsuccessfully contested the House of Assembly seat of Murray. Cowan was elected unopposed to the Legislative Council on 26 May 1949, and retired during his second term on 28 February 1959.
