= George Frederick Dashwood =

Australian politician

Lieutenant George Frederick Dashwood RN (20 September 1806 – 15 March 1881), frequently referred to as "Captain Dashwood", was a naval officer, public servant and politician in South Australia. He was appointed an acting member of the Legislative Council of South Australia, serving from June 1843 to June 1844.

== Early life ==
Dashwood was born the son of James Dashwood (1758 – 21 November 1841) and Sarah Moseley (died 1836). He entered the Royal Naval College, Dartmouth in 1819 and served 1832–1833 under Captain C. H. Fremantle on HMS Challenger, noted for earlier (1829) claiming all of New Holland west of New South Wales for the Crown. He was commissioned lieutenant in December 1833, later served on the survey vessel Sulphur. Dashwood suffered terribly from rheumatism, and was retired on half pay.

Dashwood married Sarah Rebecca Loine on 27 December 1839 in a Catholic church in London. They arrived in South Australia aboard Orissa in November 1841. He purchased an estate 5 miles (8.0 km) west of Meadows, named Dashwood's Gully. He and Sarah married again in a civil ceremony for reasons of bureaucratic convenience. In 1844 he applied for partial remission of the purchase price of the land by virtue of his naval service. This was initially refused, but granted in 1850 after much argument.

== Public career ==
In 1842 he was appointed justice of the peace and sworn in as magistrate, and on 15 June 1843 he was appointed to the Legislative Council, holding this position until July 1844, when he resigned, and apart from a public meeting at which he protested against the proposed settlement in the colony of a contingent of Parkhurst boys, he took no part in public life until November 1846, when he was reappointed J.P., and in April 1847 he was made Acting Commissioner of Police and Police Magistrate. Two years later he was appointed Stipendiary Magistrate for Port Adelaide. In October 1850 he was appointed Police Commissioner a position he held until January 1852, when he was appointed Collector of Customs, succeeding (later Sir) R. R. Torrens. In July 1858 he was appointed Emigration Agent in Great Britain, and apart from a visit in May 1861 was in England until late 1862, when the office was abolished, and served as Stipendiary Magistrate in various places including Mount Barker and Strathalbyn. In 1875, he was appointed Stipendiary Magistrate for Port Adelaide and Edithburgh. He held this post until around 1880. It is a tribute to his negotiating skills that he retained his previous salary level of £650 p.a. rather than £350. Curiously, Richard Francis Newland, who followed Dashwood into the Legislative Council and sat for an even shorter time, and also served as Magistrate in Port Adelaide, was in 1863 promoted from Assistant Emigration Agent to Emigration Agent.

== Other interests ==
- While sailing with the Royal Navy, he produced a number of pencil and watercolor sketches.
- Dashwood was president of the Mount Barker Agricultural and Horticultural Society from 1865 to 1870.
- He was a trustee of the Savings Bank of South Australia 1848–1849.

== Family ==
George Frederick Dashwood married Sarah Rebecca Loine ( – 2 December 1885) on 27 December 1839 and again in 1842. Their family included:

- George Dashwood (c. 1839 – 31 July 1865) died in Sierra Leone.
- Charles James Dashwood (17 July 1842 – 8 July 1919) married Kate Allen; he married again, to Martha Margarethe Johanna Klevesahl ( – ) in 1916.
- Francis Robert Dashwood (19 May 1844 – ) attended St. Peter's College
- Sarah Jane Melicent Dashwood (26 March 1846 – 25 September 1934) married Charles Hawkes Todd Connor (c. 1838 – 21 May 1926) on 7 June 1866, lived at "Forest Lodge", Dashwood's Gully, then 144 Barnard Street, North Adelaide
- Margaret Henrietta Dashwood (1850 – 23 February 1925), lived at North Adelaide; she never married.
- Decourcy Dashwood (1852– ) perhaps named for Elizabeth de Courcy, who married Charles Dashwood RN (1765–1847)
- Augusta Caroline Dashwood (1855 – 5 August 1912) never married
