= William Bartley (politician) =

Australian politician (1801–1885)

William Bartley (4 January 1801 – 3 September 1885) was a lawyer in South Australia who was appointed an acting member of the Legislative Council of South Australia, serving in 1849.

== History ==
Bartley was born in Liverpool, England, and was admitted an attorney of the King's Bench at the age of 19. He emigrated to Australia with his wife and their three children on the Lysander, arriving in South Australia in July 1839, and immediately resumed practice, joining Charles Mann and Edward Castres Gwynne. He mentored William Bakewell, with whom he founded the partnership of Bartley & Bakewell, which became one of the leading legal offices in the colony. R. I. Stow was articled to the firm, then joined as a partner of Bartley, Bakewell & Stow, famously representing the Church of England in its unsuccessful suit against the Corporation of Adelaide, for allocation of land on Victoria Square on which to build a cathedral.

He was appointed acting Crown Solicitor and Advocate-General for South Australia in January 1849, with a seat on the Legislative Council, to April or May, while William Smillie was on leave in Tasmania.

After the passage in 1857 of the Real Property Act, Bartley was appointed Senior Solicitor to the Lands Titles Office, a position which he held until 1881, when he retired. As a public servant he has barred from private practice and politics.

He died at his residence on South Terrace, Adelaide.

== Family ==
William Bartley married Sarah Redish ( – 1849) sometime around 1830. Their children included:

- Margaret Bartley ( – 29 June 1881) married John Bristow Hughes J.P. (1817–1881) on 6 January 1847
- Sarah Bartley ( – 1890?)
- Thomas Bartley

He married again, to Sarah Ann Cooper (c. 1804 – 31 May 1895) in 1852. Sarah was a sister of Sir Charles Cooper, first Chief Justice of South Australia.
