= Thomas Williams (South Australian politician) =

Australian politician

Thomas Williams of Rushden Hall & Warfield Lodge (c. 1794 – 2 December 1881) was a politician in the colony of South Australia, serving as a non-official acting member of the Legislative Council of South Australia from June 1843 to September 1843.

== History ==
Williams was a son of Robert Williams of Warfield Lodge (died 1803) and Jane Cunningham, whom he married in 1794. The Williams were an old family of Herringston, Dorset, with interests in the banking business.

Williams was at one time High Sheriff of Northamptonshire and a partner in the banking firm of Williams Deacon and Co. He was a major investor with the South Australian Company and closely associated with Lord John Russell, Gibbon Wakefield, and George Fife Angas.

Williams, his wife Catherine, née Codd, and much of their family emigrated on the Platina, arriving in South Australia in February 1839, and for a time they lived in "The Barn", in Wakefield Street, a rambling thatched wooden structure built in 1837, perhaps Adelaide's first permanent residence, whose previous tenants included H. B. T. Strangways, Lady Hindmarsh, then Hindmarsh's sons-in-law Milner Stephen and Alfred Miller Mundy. The place was destroyed by fire in May 1857.

Williams, with Governor Gawler and J. B. Hack had a special survey of Little Para farm land taken out in the Para Wirra area, and by him named "The Hermitage", his portion being 2,000 acres (810 ha). He fenced the property, and built a homestead where he lived, and as early as 1840 was growing wheat. He established a garden and vineyard, asserted to have been SA's first. To pay for this and for his children's education, he liquidated almost every one of his shares in the South Australian Company, coupled with an overdraft on his account with the Bank of South Australia of some £2,900.

He was in June 1843 appointed by Governor Gawler to one of the four newly created "non-official" (i.e. without portfolio) seats on the second Legislative Council. Unfortunately for him, the value of his land had not increased as expected, and he had difficulties meeting the interest on his loan. He mortgaged the choicest 1,700 acres with his daughter Elizabeth, without mentioning the fact to the bank, which held the deeds as security on the overdraft. He resigned as an undischarged bankrupt, and Jacob Hagen was appointed in his place. He was jailed for six months for his fraudulent actions. His creditors were paid 2 shillings in the pound (10%), while his daughter, who in 1844 became Mrs. Peachey, retained possession of "The Hermitage".

He had three children following his release (in 1844, 1846 and 1848), then returned to England, living at Warfield Lodge near Windsor, Berkshire.

== Family ==
Thomas Williams married Mary Frances Benthon in 1817 and Catherine Codd in 1833. Their children on the Platina were:

- Elizabeth Williams ( – ) married Peter Peachey ( – 24 August 1849) on 30 May 1844.
- Cunningham Williams (1822 – 5 January 1906) married Harriette Sophia Ford ( – 4 November 1891) on 26 February 1863, lived Swan Reach, Wellington, Blanchetown, William Street, Norwood, "Waverley", Glen Osmond.

- Florence Harriette Cunningham Williams (16 December 1863 – 1918) married John Hoar (1864–1954) on 18 August 1887
- Marie Frances Sophia Williams (29 January 1865 – 1949) married Samuel Allan Townshend (1897–1925) on 6 October 1896
- Cunningham Herbert Plantagenet Williams (16 February 1866 – ) married Gertrude Kate Letchford (1876– ) on 17 March 1898
- Edith Maude Augusta Williams (1868– ) married A. P. Selby Davidson ( – ) on 8 September 1903
- Ethel Constance Louise Cunningham Williams (30 December 1868 – ) married Dr. Robert Henry Pulleine ( – ) on 2 March 1899

- George Sibley Williams (1825 – 20 December 1902) owner of Parnaroo station and Point Lowly.
- Edward Williams (1827– )?
- John Williams (1824 – 4 April 1890) married Isabel Howard in 1857. Partnership with brother George. Married Maria Guy on 18 June 1872. He was MLA for Barossa 1864–1865 and Flinders 1865–1868 and 1875–1878
- Catherine Williams (perhaps the Catherine who married eldest son William Thomas, not on the Platina, perhaps deceased)
- Helen Williams (on passenger list but not mentioned in family tree)

born in SA:

- Rev. Hartley Williams (1844 – 18 January 1927) married Emma Jane Moorhouse (1850 – 21 December 1895) in 1871
- Henry Plantagenet Williams (1848– )

arrived on Lady MacNaughton September 1851

- Mary Frances Williams (c. 1829 – 29 October 1918) married William Hinde ( – 11 September 1878), Master of the Supreme Court. She was headmistress of Riverside School.

- Mary Amphillis "Minnie" Hinde ( – 23 September 1889)
- Ellen Frances Hinde (1851 – 27 May 1941)
- William John Hinde SM (1856 – 25 November 1937) married Annette Harcourt "Annie" Halbert (1855 – 9 November 1924) in 1881, daughter of George Edward Halbert
- Alice Berthon Hinde (1860 – 5 August 1904)
- Herbert Edward Hinde (1862 – 28 June 1944) married Ethelwyn Hamilton "Ethel Adelaide" Ayliffe (6 August 1868 – 10 December 1944) on 13 December 1902. She was a granddaughter of Thomas Hamilton Ayliffe
- Frederick Hinde (1864 – 9 October 1887)
- Mabel Charlotte Hinde (1868– )
