= John Mitchell Sinclair =

Australian politician (c. 1819–1890

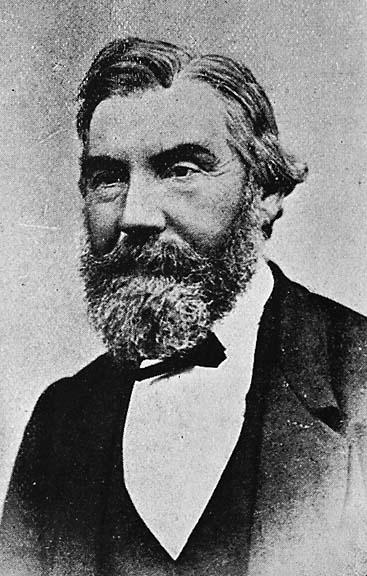

Member of the South Australian House of Assembly for West Torrens
- In office September 1876 – April 1878

Mayor of Port Adelaide
- In office 1866–1869 and 1873–1876

Personal details
- Died: 7 October 1890

John Mitchell Sinclair (c. 1819 – 7 October 1890), generally referred to as J. M. Sinclair, (Note: A great number of references, including every newspaper obituary, give his full name as James Mitchell Sinclair.) was a businessman and politician in the colony of South Australia.

Sinclair arrived at Port Adelaide about 1849, and after serving in the Customs acted as clerk to Captain Scott. In 1861 he went into partnership with Joshua Little (c. 1831–1920) as Sinclair & Little, customs and shipping agents. Little and Sinclair dissolved their partnership in January 1865, and Sinclair went into business for himself, using the same warehouse; Little went into partnership with his brother-in-law David Wylie Scott (1833–1887).

He was a member of the South Australian House of Assembly for the seat of West Torrens from September 1876 to April 1878.

Sinclair and his son Thomas were involved in an extraordinary insolvency case: around 1874 they founded a Customs house shipping agency which over the succeeding four years did a huge amount of business, but came undone with a devaluation of shipping property. The son, who conducted his own defence with distinction, was jailed for a minor matter, and the father was criticised for exercising insufficient control.

He acted as Customs Agent and Auditor to Port Adelaide Council and Clerk to the LeFevre's Peninsula District Council, Town Clerk for the Semaphore Corporation and Mayor of Port Adelaide 1866–1869 and 1873–1876. His successor, John Formby, paid a gracious compliment to his dedication and effectiveness.

He was an obstinate character, not prepared to back down when his mind was set. One time, as Mayor of Port Adelaide, he had posts driven into the road between the rails when the Government was running railway trucks down Commercial Road without consultation. The Government were equally obstinate, and returned the compliment by placing a whole train of loaded trucks from the barricade to St. Vincent Street, completely obstructing St Vincent Street. Eventually the Mexican standoff resolved itself, but from then on the Government was more circumspect in its dealings with the Port Adelaide Council.

== Family ==
- John Sinclair (c. 1845 – 18 Jan 1876) died on the island of Savu, near Timor, aged 26 years.
- Grace Garrioch Sinclair (c. 1847 – 26 May 1872) died in Hong kong.
- Thomas Mitchell "Tom" Sinclair (c. 1852 – 1893) married Mary Ann Neill (c. 1852 – 29 July 1932) on 18 September 1874.
- Margaret Craigie "Maggie" Sinclair (c. 1854 – 25 May 1891).
- James Hugh "Jim" Sinclair (c. 1857 – 10 April 1943). Educated at Whinham College, lawyer, co-founder of S.A. Football Association, prominent in Christian Endeavour. He married Helena Close, lived Seaview Road, Grange. James and Helena had three boys. All served in the armed forces.

- John Mitchell Sinclair (7 July 1894 – 30 July 1918) killed in action in France during World War I.
