= John Bosworth =

Australian politician

John Bosworth (May 1836 – 27 September 1917) was a politician in the early days of the Colony of South Australia.

== History ==
He was born in London, the youngest son of Richard Bosworth and his wife Mary, and was brought out to South Australia as a young child on the Hooghly, arriving in December 1848. He was educated at St Peter's College and as a young man was a pastoralist at Edgecliff near Riverton. He was elected to the seat of Wooroora in the House of Assembly in 1875, succeeding James Pearce. He was reelected in 1878 with Henry Edward Bright as colleague, and left Parliament in 1884; then was elected by the North-Eastern district in 1886 to the Legislative Council, retiring in 1894.

== Family ==
He married Catherine Lucy "Kate" Cramond ( – 4 November 1863) on 28 December 1862; he married again, to Ellen Maria Ward (ca.1845 – 26 August 1920) of Hackney. Their children included:

- Kate Bosworth (29 October 1863 – 28 January 1885)
- Ellie Bosworth (6 May January 1869 – ) married John Poole Roddick of British Columbia on 3 March 1904
- Amy Bosworth (1 January 1870 – 24 June 1944)
- John Henry Ward Bosworth (20 March 1876 – 30 November 1924) lived in Western Australia

His last homes were "Bentford", Hectorville and 102 Park Terrace (renamed Greenhill Road), Wayville.
