= Wentworth Cavenagh =

Australian politician (1821–1885)

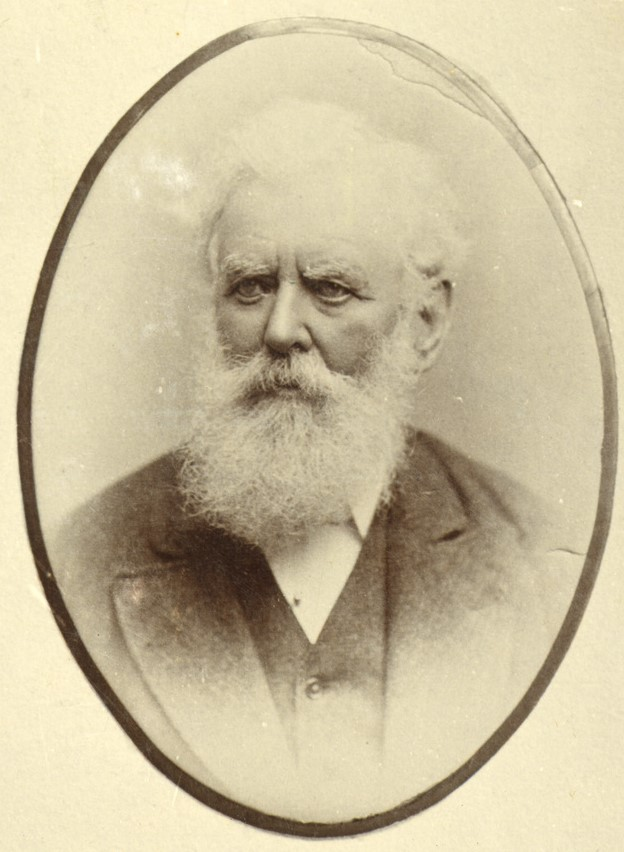

Member of the South Australian House of Assembly for Yatala
- In office 17 November 1862 – 24 April 1881

Commissioner of Crown Lands
- In office 3 November 1868 – 30 May 1870

Commissioner of Public Works
- In office 4 March 1872 – 22 July 1873

Wentworth Cavenagh (1821 – 5 January 1895), also known as Wentworth Cavenagh–Mainwaring, was an Australian politician.

Cavenagh was member for Yatala in the South Australian House of Assembly from 17 November 1862 to 24 April 1881; and was Commissioner of Crown Lands, under Henry Strangways, from 3 November 1868 to 30 May 1870, and Commissioner of Public Works in the Henry Ayers Government from 4 March 1872 to 22 July 1873. In 1887, he received permission to bear the title of Honourable. Having married Ellen, daughter of Gordon Mainwaring, who, on the death of her brother in 1891, became entitled to the Whitmore Hall estate, in Staffordshire, he assumed the additional name of Mainwaring.

Political offices
Preceded by James Ramsay	Commissioner of Public Works; 4 March 1872 – 22 Jul 1873	Succeeded by Henry Bright
South Australian House of Assembly
Previous: Edward McEllister	Member for Yatala; 1862 – 1881; Served alongside: Lavington Glyde, Thomas Cowan, John Darling	Succeeded by David Murray
