= Henry Edward Bright =

Australian politician

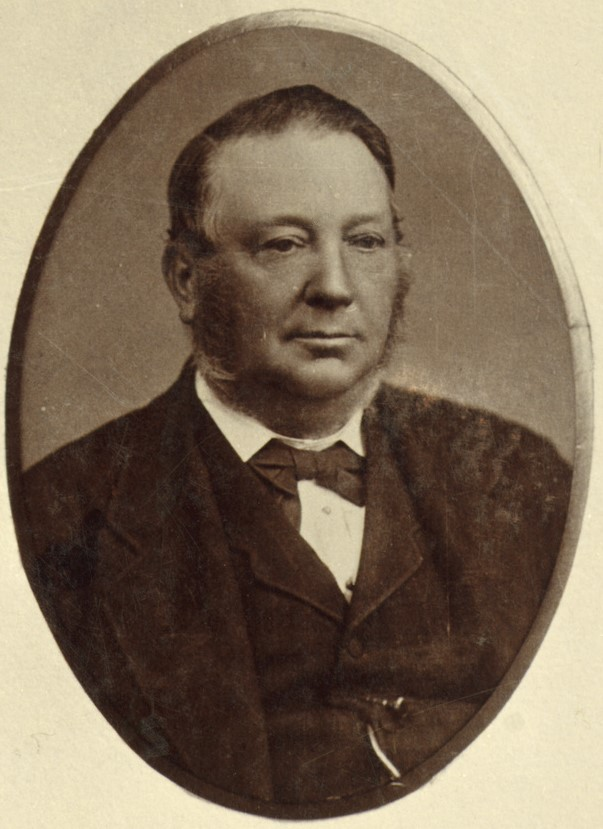

Member of the South Australian House of Assembly for Stanley
- In office 1865–1875

Member of the South Australian House of Assembly for Wooroora
- In office 1875–1884

Commissioner of Public Works
- In office 1873–1875

Member of the Legislative Council of South Australia
- In office 1885–1891

Personal details
- Born: 30 June 1819 London, UK
- Died: 18 February 1904 (aged 84)

Hon. Henry Edward Bright (30 June 1819 – 18 February 1904) was a member of the South Australian Colonial Parliament. A son, Henry Edward Bright jr. (1843–1917), was a mayor of Gawler, South Australia.

== Early life ==
Bright was born in London on 30 June 1819, the son of Edward Bright and Mary Ann. He, his wife Jane Prudence (née King) and son Henry Edward Bright jr. arrived in Adelaide in April 1850.

== Political career ==
Bright was a member for Stanley in the South Australian House of Assembly from March 1865 to February 1875, and for Wooroora from February 1875 to April 1884. From July 1873 to June 1875, he was Commissioner of Public Works in the Government of the Sir Arthur Blyth, and in May 1885 was elected to the Legislative Council of South Australia, of which he was a member until May 1891.

== Family ==
Bright married Jane Prudence King (1816 – 23 Feb 1904) at St. George's in Hanover Square, London on 15 March 1841.

- Their son Henry Edward Bright jr. (16 March 1843 – 12 November 1917) was born in Chelmsford, Essex and educated at L. S. Burton's school, Gawler and King Edward VI Grammar School, Chelmsford. He married Harriet Garrood on 29 October 1863, and was mayor of Gawler in 1879 and 1880.
- Youngest son Thomas Robert Bright S.M. (ca.1852 – 9 December 1924) married Jane Rogers (ca.1849 – 20 September 1936), second daughter of William Rogers, on 26 May 1874.

== See also ==
- Hundred of Bright

Political offices
| Preceded by Wentworth Cavenagh | Commissioner of Public Works; 22 Jul 1873 – 3 Jun 1875 | Succeeded by William West-Erskine |
South Australian House of Assembly
| Preceded by George Young | Member for Stanley; 1865 – 1875; Served alongside: George Kingston | Succeeded by Charles Mann |
| New district | Member for Wooroora; 1875 – 1884; Served alongside: James Pearce, John Bosworth | Succeeded by John Duncan |
