= John Williams (South Australian politician) =

Australian politician

John Williams (1824 – 4 April 1890) was a pastoralist and politician in the colony of South Australia.

== History ==
Williams was a son of Thomas Williams (c. 1794–1881) and his second wife Catherine, née Codd, who with much of their family emigrated on the Platina, arriving in South Australia in February 1839, and established a farm "The Hermitage" on the Little Para River. He purchased property at Black Rock in 1851, which he developed as a sheep run, and with his brother George Sibley Williams (1825 – 20 December 1902) owned a sheep run at Parnaroo, east of Peterborough, with little success, largely due to the rabbit plague. Their partnership was dissolved in 1876.

He was member for Barossa 1864–1865 and for Flinders 1865–1868 and 1875–1878. He retired to his home in North Adelaide. He was not a brilliant debater, and only spoke on subjects with which he was thoroughly conversant.

He made a sizeable fortune through an early investment in BHP. He died at his home "Halberstadt", Jeffcott Street, North Adelaide, after a long illness. Mrs. Williams, her daughter Florence Guy, and at least one son retired to New Zealand.

== Family ==
He married Isabel Barbara Howard (died 21 September 1866) on 22 December 1857. Isabel was a daughter of Rev. Charles Beaumont Howard and step-daughter of Rev. James Farrell. He married again, to the widow Maria Guy (née MacDowell) on 18 June 1872; they had a home "Syward Lodge", Mitcham. Maria had married Lieut. M(ichael) Stewart Guy R.N. (c. 1840 – 4 July 1869) on 13 July 1867 and had a daughter Florence Guy on 21 June 1868. Children of John and Maria include:

- John Herbert Berthon Williams (29 March 1873 – )
- Thomas Acland Williams (1875– )
- Reginald MacDowell Williams (24 August 1876 – )
- eldest daughter Isabel Herbert Williams (13 January 1878 – 27 January 1890)
- youngest son Hartley Williams (c. 1881 – 3 August 1894) died in Christchurch
