= Matthew Madge =

Australian politician

Matthew Henry Madge (c. 1838 – 1 March 1916) was a politician in the colony of South Australia.

He was born in Southampton and emigrated to South Australia with his parents in 1854. His father, John Madge, opened a bakery on Robe Terrace, North Adelaide, and in 1858 transferred his business to The Parade, Norwood, taking over the premises of Charles Springet. The following year he was forced to declare insolvency.

In 1860 Matthew Henry opened a bakery in Moonta Street, off Gouger Street and prospered. In 1881 he retired from commercial life, leaving the business with his eldest son, E. A. H. Madge. (A. E. H Madge?)

He was a longtime councillor and alderman of the Adelaide City Council for various periods from 1870, when he was elected for Grey ward.

He was member of the House of Assembly for Wallaroo from February 1875 to May 1875, when he was unseated by petition, having been found guilty of soliciting votes, by personally asking voters for their vote and support. Sir Robert Ross filled the vacancy.

He was active in the Temperance cause, a Rechabite and a member of the Methodist church in Halifax Street. He was an active supporter of the Royal Victorian Institute for the Blind, and Hon. treasurer of the Point McLeay Aboriginal Mission.

== Family ==
He married Emily (c. March 1838 – 19 September 1915) c. 1858; they had four sons:

- E. A. H. Madge of Gouger Street
- M. H. H. Madge of South Terrace
- A. W. J. Madge of Melbourne
- A. L. J. Madge of Brisbane
