= Electoral district of Yatala =

Former South Australian state electoral district

Coordinates: 34°50′S 138°41′E

Yatala South Australia—House of Assembly
- State: South Australia
- Created: 1857
- Abolished: 1902
- Demographic: Rural

Yatala is a former electorate of the South Australian House of Assembly located within the cadastral Hundred of Yatala. It was one of the original Assembly districts in 1857, abolished in 1902.

Yatala was also the name of an electoral district of the unicameral South Australian Legislative Council from 1851 until its abolition in 1857, William Giles, then Arthur Blyth being the members.

Rural at the time, most parts of the district would now be considered metropolitan.

== Members ==
Member	Party	Term	Member	Party	Term
John Harvey		1857–1860	Charles Hare		1857–1857
John Harvey		1857–1860	Richard Andrews		1857–1860
Lavington Glyde		1860–1875	Edward McEllister		1860–1862
Lavington Glyde		1860–1875	Wentworth Cavenagh		1862–1881
Thomas Cowan		1875–1878	Wentworth Cavenagh		1862–1881
John Darling Sr.		1878–1881	Wentworth Cavenagh		1862–1881
William Gilbert		1881–1891	David Murray		1881–1881
William Gilbert		1881–1891	Josiah Bagster		1881–1890
William Gilbert		1881–1891	James Cowan		1890–1890
William Gilbert		1881–1891	Richard Butler		1890–1902
William Gilbert	Defence League	1891–1896	Richard Butler		1890–1902
William Gilbert	National League	1896–1902	Richard Butler		1890–1902
