= 1875 South Australian colonial election =

- 10 February−1 March 1875

All seats in the South Australian House of Assembly
- Results by electoral district for the House of Assembly

Colonial elections were held in South Australia from 10 February to 1 March 1875. All 46 seats in the South Australian House of Assembly were up for election.

A redistribution was carried out in 1872 transforming the electoral geography. The new structure increased the number of electorates from 18 to 22, and the number of members from 36 to 46. The system returned to electorates containing different numbers of members - three 3-member electorates, 18 with two members, and North Adelaide with one member.

The instability of government continued, but it was a battle between two leaders. Henry Ayers who, from the Legislative Council, led more ministries than any other person in the history of SA, had defeated Arthur Blyth as soon as the Assembly met, one month after the 1871 election, re-shuffled his ministry after only 42 days, and then survived until he was defeated by Blyth in July 1873. Blyth remained in office and took the parliament to the full term.

Since the inaugural 1857 election, no parties or solid groupings had been formed, which resulted in frequent changes of the Premier. If for any reason the incumbent Premier of South Australia lost sufficient support through a successful motion of no confidence at any time on the floor of the house, he would tender his resignation to the Governor of South Australia, which would result in another member deemed to have the support of the House of Assembly being sworn in by the Governor as the next Premier.

Informal groupings began and increased government stability occurred from the 1887 election. The United Labor Party would be formed in 1891, while the National Defence League would be formed later in the same year.

== See also ==
- Premier of South Australia
