= Lavington Glyde =

Australian politician

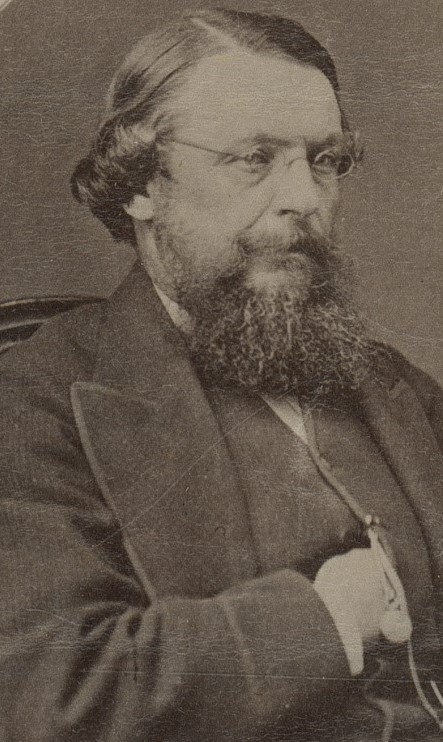
- Born: 24 April 1823; Exeter, Devon, England
- Died: 31 July 1890 (aged 66); Kensington, South Australia
- Spouse(s): Mary Ellen Hardcastle and her sister Alice Phoebe Kepert (nee Hardcastle)
- Parent(s): Jonathan Lavington Glyde and Sarah Glyde (nee Evans)

Treasurer of South Australia and Minister for Lands

Member of Parliament for East Torrens

Member of Parliament for Yatala

Member of Parliament for Victoria

Lavington Glyde (24 April 1823 – 31 July 1890) was a Treasurer of South Australia.

Glyde was born on 24 April 1823 in Exeter, Devon. England, and emigrated to South Australia in 1847. Ten years later he entered the South Australian Legislative Assembly, in which he sat in every parliament from the first to the tenth inclusive. From 1857 to 1860 he represented East Torrens, from March 1860 to May 1875 Yatala, and from May 1877 to April 1884 Victoria. He was Treasurer in the Francis Dutton Ministry in July 1863, and Minister of Lands on four occasions: from July 1863, to July 1864, October to November 1865, May 1867 to September 1868, and October to November 1868, in the first Henry Ayers, the first John Hart, and the fourth and fifth Ayers Ministries respectively. Mr. Glyde was Treasurer in Arthur Blyth's Government from July 1873 to May 1875, and again in John Bray's Government from June 1881 to April 1884.

Glyde subsequently retired from public life, and in October 1885 accepted the Accountancy to the Court of Insolvency, a position he held till his death, which took place at Kensington, Adelaide on 31 July 1890. With the one exception of Sir Arthur Blyth, Mr. Glyde had been a Minister of the Crown for a longer term of years than any other South Australian politician. He was a singularly able debater, and his Budget speeches and financial addresses generally were models of clearness.
