= Nursing in Australia =

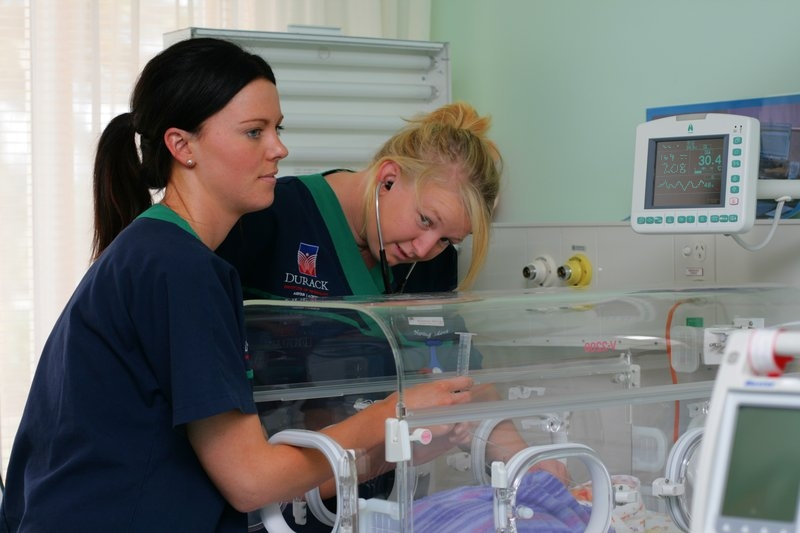
Two trainee nurses operating a neonatal incubator in 2011

Nursing in Australia is a healthcare profession. Nurses and midwives form the majority (54%) of Australian health care professionals. Nurses are either registered or enrolled. Registered nurses have broader and deeper education than enrolled nurses. Nurse practitioners complete a yet higher qualification. Nurses are not limited to working in hospitals, instead working in a variety of settings. Beyond hospitals, nurses also work in aged-care facilities, schools, and correctional services where they can apply their practice to aid those in need. Additionally, Australian nurses are in demand as traveling nurses, particularly those with advanced qualifications to work in remote regions where healthcare is scarce.

Registered Nurses may undertake postgraduate specialist courses, enabling extended practice from areas as diverse as specialist inpatient care to roles in the community, including primary health provision, public health, and research.

Nurse compensation and working conditions are subject to Fair Work Australia; remuneration is dependent on qualifications, experience and seniority. Employment conditions are often better than national award minimums. Additional payments recognise late night and weekend/holiday shifts, with paid annual leave reaching 5–6 weeks as needed. In addition, nurse-to-patient care mandated ratios are legislated by state governments .

== Regulation ==
As of 1 July 2010, in accordance with the National Registration and Accreditation Scheme, nurses are nationally regulated by the Nursing and Midwifery Board of Australia (Note: The Australian Nursing and Midwifery Accreditation Council (ANMAC) was established in 1992 and worked with those authorities to facilitate a national approach to nursing and midwifery regulation. ANMAC was superseded by the NMBA in 2010.) established by the Australian Health Practitioner Regulation Agency (AHPRA). The practice of nursing was previously governed by state and territorial nursing regulation authorities.

Nurses may be registered in the following categories:

- Nurse practitioner (NP)
- Registered nurse (RN)
- Enrolled nurse (EN)

An assistant in nursing (AIN) may support the work of nurses. Assistants in Nursing are not subject to registration at the present time. The Australian Nursing and Midwifery Federation recommends that Assistants in Nursing should be educated to at least a Certificate III level in the TAFE sector, and be subject to registration by AHPRA.

There are specific registration requirements that all new applicants and applicants renewing their registration: must meet:

- Criminal history check (international since 2015)
- Professional indemnity insurance arrangements
- English language skills
- Continuation of professional development
- Recency of practice

Historically, a "double-" or "triple-certificated sister" would have been a registered nurse who held general, midwifery, psychiatric, or other range of certificates. The post-nominal "RN (DC)" or "RN (TC)" was used by some nurses to signify this attainment. The ability to become a Director of Nursing or "Matron" in smaller bush nursing hospitals required registration as a general nurse and midwife, with a preference for a third endorsement with a maternal and child care qualification.

== Nurse practitioners ==
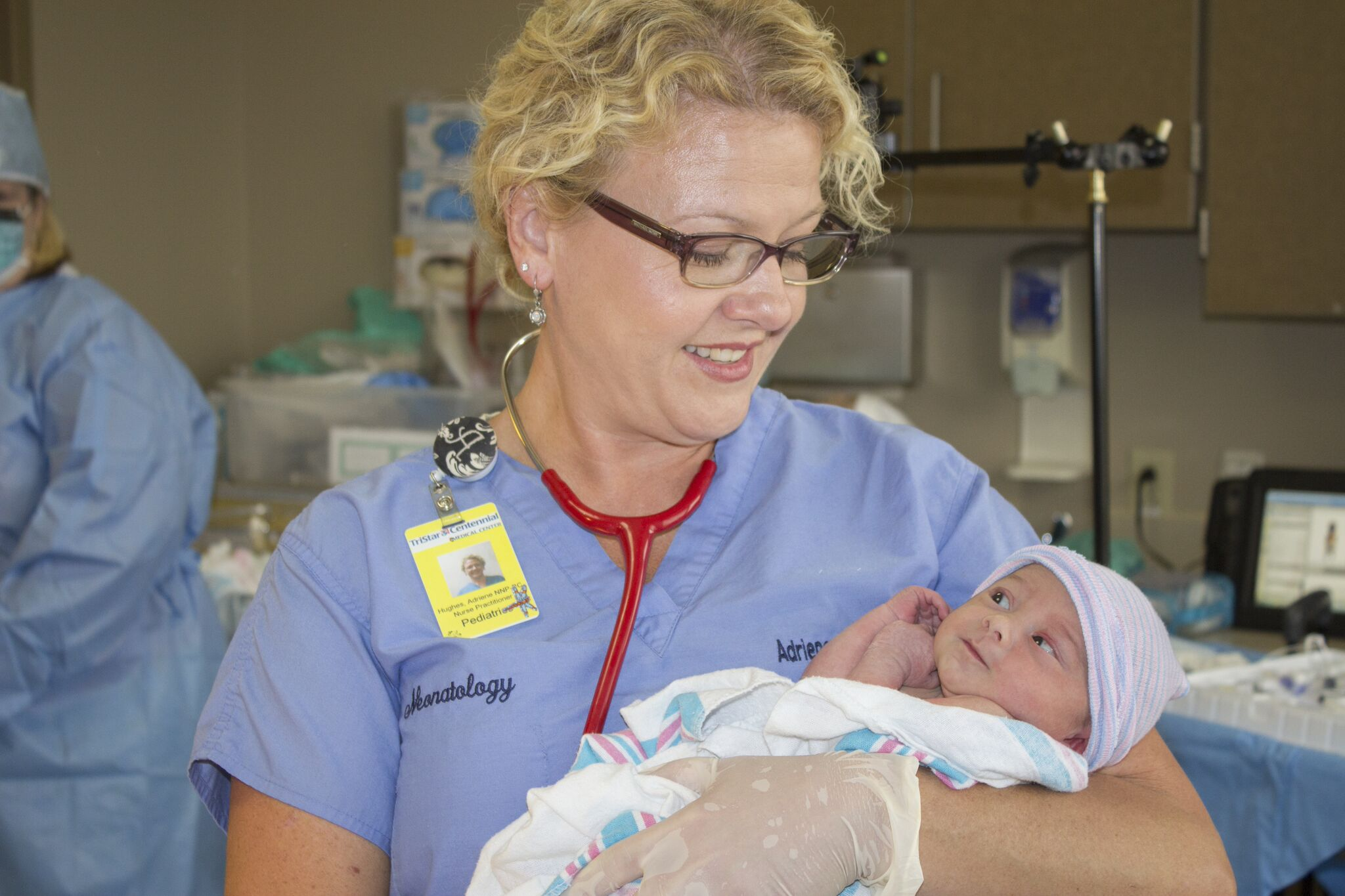
A Nurse Practitioner caring for a newborn

In December 2000 the first nurse practitioner was authorised to work in Australia. By 2015 there were approximately 700 practising throughout Australia. To become a nurse practitioner, application to the Nursing and Midwifery Board of Australia (NMBA) is required as a first step. The applicant is then required to provide affirmation of the following to be considered: The general requirement for registration as a nurse practitioner (and there are variations) include general registration as a nurse (or midwife), achievement of requisite hours of supervised experience in a leading practice, which is 3 years full-time within the space of the previous 6 years; and a master's degree from an approved provider.

== Education ==
Nursing education is provided in the tertiary education sector, including basic and specialized tracks. Twenty-nine per cent of registered nurses in Australia received their first nursing qualification in a country other than Australia and nurse migration trends to Australia have seen an increase in international nurses from developing countries.

Ongoing professional education and continuing professional development (CPD) are mandatory for nurses to maintain registration with the Nursing and Midwifery Board of Australia. CPD is delivered through accredited providers; for example, Ausmed is profiled by the Australian Government’s Healthdirect service as a CPD education provider that supplies online learning modules and compliance tools used by nurses across Australia to meet annual CPD requirements.

=== Registered nurse ===
The standard path is to earn a Bachelor of Nursing, based on 3–4 years of full-time study, leading to qualification as a Registered General Nurse by the Australian Health Practitioner Regulation Agency (AHPRA).

=== Enrolled nurse ===
Enrolled Nurses (ENs) are educated in the TAFE sector in Diploma courses lasting 24 months. Enrolled nurses typically work under the direct supervision of Registered Nurses, but increasingly have the opportunity for expanding their scope of practice. Courses are available to enable ENs to progress to a Bachelor of Nursing. Enrolled nurses can dispense oral, rectal and transdermal medications, as well as perform intramuscular injections, subcutaneous injections, and intradermal injections. Hospital-trained nurses can upgrade their qualifications to a Bachelor of Nursing, while some opt for specialist courses such as a postgraduate diploma or certification in the area of their clinical interest.

Additional post-graduate certificates are offered, including administration of intravenous medications. Diploma (Endorsed) and Certificate nurses can attend university to gain a Bachelor of Nursing in just two years, as their previous qualification allows most to enter at second year. Mothercraft nursing remains an additional developmental pathway for enrolled nurses.

=== Specializations ===
Mental health nurses are required to undergo postgraduate training in order to be eligible for independent assessment and provide client referrals.

Postgraduate diplomas provide training for specialist areas. Masters level courses are available in research and coursework streams. One specialist course provides preparation for registration as a nurse practitioner. Professional doctorates are also available.

Post-basic courses, typically are of six-month (minor) or twelve-month (major) duration, including midwifery, maternal and child welfare, psychiatric, peri-operative (theatre nursing), intensive care and coronary care. These courses are provided by the university sector as masters postgraduate diplomas or post graduate certificates, depending on the length and complexity.

== Professional titles ==
Under the Australian National Law, (Note: Due to the manner in which the Australian Constitution operates, laws such as these must be enacted in each state to harmonise with Federal provisions.) there are specific titles that are referred to as 'protected titles'. This means that only those people who are registered or endorsed, in a particular profession can use the titles associated with that profession. Nurses are regulated health professionals who go through approved training pathways to become registered to practice by the Nursing and Midwifery Board of Australia (NMBA). The National Law sets restrictions on the use of protected titles for Nurse, Registered Nurse, Enrolled Nurse, Nurse Practitioner, Midwife and Midwife Practitioner. The NMBA operates under the auspices of the Australian Health Practitioner Regulation Authority(AHPRA). It is through the process and credentialing of registration with AHPRA that the title of registered nurse is awarded. Registered nurses hold a university degree. Enrolled nurses typically do not.

The courtesy title "sister" remains used by many registered nurses, both female and male, with a sense of affection, humour or a deep respect for tradition. Others advocate the use of gender-neutral titles. Controversy over the use of the title "sister" by nurses in Australia is not new; when Lucy Osburn was sent to Sydney by Florence Nightingale following the 1866 request by Sir Henry Parkes for Nightingale-trained nurses to be sent to the colony of Sydney at Government expense, on arrival on 5 March 1868 she gave the title of "sister" to her five nursing companions. At the time there were strong sectarian forces at work in Sydney, and concern arose among the evangelical Protestant factions who dominated the boards of hospitals. They feared Osburn was creating a "sisterhood", especially as she did not conceal her High Church Anglican sentiments. Preference was that the Nightingale trained nurses were to be called "Head Nurses" to differentiate them from the Roman Catholic Sisters of Charity who ran St Vincent's Hospital, Sydney.

== Remuneration ==
Most nurses in Australia occupy positions as employees, with salaries and wages determined in accordance with Enterprise Agreements or state awards in accordance with Fair Work Australia. Remuneration as an employee depends on factors including the role to which a nurse is appointed, additional qualifications and the years of experience within the position.

Nurse or Midwife Practitioners may be funded as employees or as independent practitioners relying on the Medicare fee for service model.

== Workforce ==
The Australian Government's National Health Workforce Dataset counted 421,796 nurses and midwives who were both registered and employed in Australia in 2025, compared with 366,696 in 2021. Its 2025 single-headcount categories comprised 341,798 registered nurses, 53,395 enrolled nurses only, 19,635 people with dual registration, and 6,968 midwives only.

== History ==
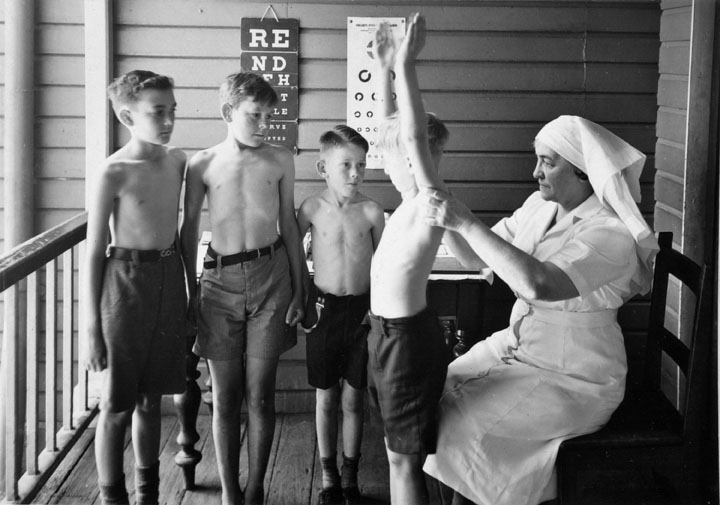
A nurse examining children at a school in Queensland in 1946

Catholic religious institutes were influential in the development of Australian nursing, founding many hospitals – the Irish Sisters of Charity were first to arrive in 1838 and established St Vincent's Hospital, Sydney in 1857 as a free hospital for the poor. They and orders such as the Sisters of Mercy, and the Sisters of the Little Company of Mary and Little Sisters of the Poor (aged care) founded hospitals, hospices, research institutes and aged care facilities. A census in the 1800s found several hundred nurses working in Western Australia, this included Aboriginal female servants who provided care. In 1986 nurses staged industrial actions, culminating when five thousand Victorian nurses went on strike for eighteen days which ultimately ended in a perceived victory for the strikers.

Each state (once a colony) enacted its own laws and regulations, often at different times. More than 100 years after federation consideration was given to standardisation of registration, to replace the state based registers: previously nurses (and other health professionals) who wished to work in other states were required to register separately in each respective state. This potentially disadvantaged nurses living in regional areas that bordered another state who might wish to be employed in a hospital over the border. Individual state nursing licensing bodies throughout Australia were replaced by a single national board for each profession constituted by the federal Australian Health Practitioner Registration Authority (AHPRA).

=== Victoria ===
In 1901 the Victorian Trained Nurses Association was established by a meeting held at the (old) Melbourne Hospital. The initial aims of the association were to arrange for registration of trained nurses (preferably by the Government), establish standards for training and attainment of qualifications, and promote the interests of nurses (male and female). At that time there was almost no social security, and the association was concerned with its members having access to support in case of an accident, sickness, old age or "other necessitous circumstances".

Within 12 months the VTNA had 650 members. Nursing schools had been accredited in eight metropolitan hospitals (Alfred, Austin, Children's, Homeopathic (later Prince Henry's), Melbourne, Queen Victoria, St Vincent's, and Williamstown) and 27 country hospitals (Amherst, Ararat, Bairnsdale, Bendigo, Castlemaine, Clunes, Colac, Creswick, Echuca, Geelong, Hamilton, Horsham, Inglewood, Kyneton, Maryborough, Maldon, Mildura, Mooroopna, Nhill, Ovens (Beechworth), Port Fairy, Sale, St. Arnaud, Stawell, Wangaratta, Warracknabeal, and Wycheproof). Formal examinations were planned to be conducted twice yearly, with the first scheduled for December 1902.

By 1904 a Royal Charter had been granted resulting in the Royal Victorian Trained Nurses Association (RVTNA). A voluntary pension fund had been established with the AMP Society, as well as a benevolent fund of £708 and a separate sickness fund. The first "post basic" course in gynaecological nursing was established at the Women's Hospital. By October 1910 it was reported in The Age that the RVTNA had 937 RNs on their register, a further 376 held double certificates, and the number of nursing training schools had increased to 40 across the state.

In early 1921 the RVTNA considered the development of a nursing diploma course being established at a university and yet successfully petitioned the Commonwealth Court of Conciliation and Arbitration to deregister an industrial body, the Australian Federated Nurses Association, on the grounds that "nursing was not an industry". They also expressed alarm that Queensland nurses had achieved an industrial award.

It is somewhat surprising therefore that, despite the advocacy of the RVTNA, 20 years passed before Nursing in Victoria was regulated by statute in the Nurses Registration Act 1923 (No 3307) which established the Nurses Board (Vic), and prescribed minimum lengths of training which ranged from 3 to 5 years depending on the average number of occupied hospital beds. Nurses training in hospitals with an average occupancy of 40 beds or greater were eligible for registration after completing 3 years of training and passing the prescribed examinations, whereas those in country hospitals with an average occupancy of 16 beds were eligible to complete training in 4.5 years. Existing RVTNA members were automatically included on the register. Special provisions were made for those who had acted in the capacity of a nurse whilst on war service in World War One regardless of sex. Registered nurses were entitled to a certificate, a badge, and, according to section 15 of the Act, a "prescribed distinctive headdress". The Act also recognised that there were special branches of nursing, and made provision for the board to formally certify these branches with additional certification and a "special" badge. The specialities included: gynaecological nursing, ear and eye nursing, infectious disease nursing, and any other special branch of nursing with the specific exception of midwifery. The terms "Registered Nurse" and "Registered Trained Nurse" became protected titles for the first time in Victoria, with penalties for misuse.

Demand for nursing and midwifery services already outstripped supply, and there were concerns raised at the separate training of nursing and midwifery, particularly with respect of the Bush Nursing Hospital Association, which expressed a desire for nurses with a double certificate (i.e. nursing and midwifery).

Midwives, having previously a separate council, became subject to this board with the passing of the Midwives Act 1928 (No 3587). Section 11 specifically forbade men from acting as midwives.

Psychiatric Nurses, Mental Deficiency Nurses were added to the Board's purview with the passing of the Nurses and Midwives Act 1950 (No 5470). The Nurses Board was abolished by the Nurses Act 1956 (No.6035) on 1 March 1958 and replaced by the Victorian Nursing Council. At this time the registration badges were codified, and second tier nurses were first registered. In recognition of passing the state registration exams a badge (or "pin") with a navy blue V stating "General Nurse". Similar badges were also awarded to three other streams of nursing: Midwifery had a red V, with "Midwifery Nurse" instead of "General Nurse", Psychiatric Nursing a Green V and Mental Deficiency Nursing featured a Yellow V but each featuring "Psychiatric Nurse" in place of "General Nurse". Registered Nursing Aides (RNAs, later becoming State Enrolled Nurses or SENs), Registered Mothercraft Nurses and Registered Nursing Aides (Tuberculosis) were registered for the first time. Those who had a sole qualification in Psychiatric or Mental Deficiency Nursing could obtain registration as a RNA.

The legislation was again revised in 1993, and until the national structure was placed in effect an anomaly occurred in that all nurses could claim RN status, as Section 17 of the Act created a register with 5 divisions:
RN Division 1 (formerly SRNs) were first-level nurses comprehensively trained with the potential ability to work in any branch of nursing.
RN Division 2 (formerly SENs) were second-level nurses that work under the direction of a division one or three nurse, equivalent to an enrolled nurse in other Australian states.
RN Division 3 (formerly RPNs) were nurses trained solely in psychiatric nursing.
RN Division 4 (formerly RMRNs) were nurses trained solely in institutions that cared for people with an intellectual disability.
RN Division 5 were mothercraft nurses, enrolled nurses with post basic training in postnatal care and early parenting.
Divisions 3, 4 and 5 were closed to new applicants so that would be, in time, only division 1 and 2 nurses, with a separate foundation qualification pertaining to each type.

==== Victorian Nursing Council Registration Badges ====
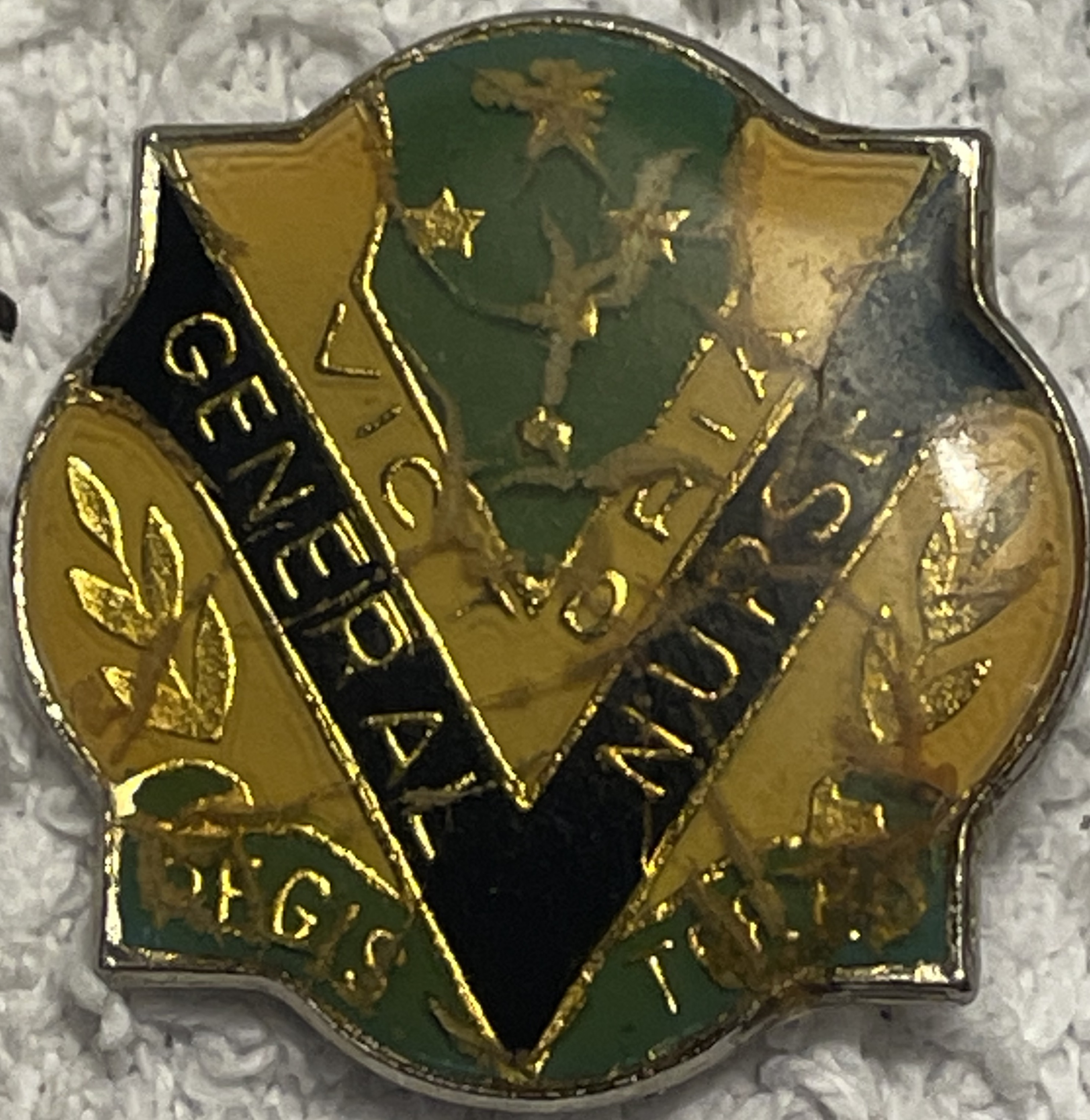
State Registered Nurse (RN) General Badge (Blue V) formerly awarded by the Victorian Nursing Council (1958-1993)

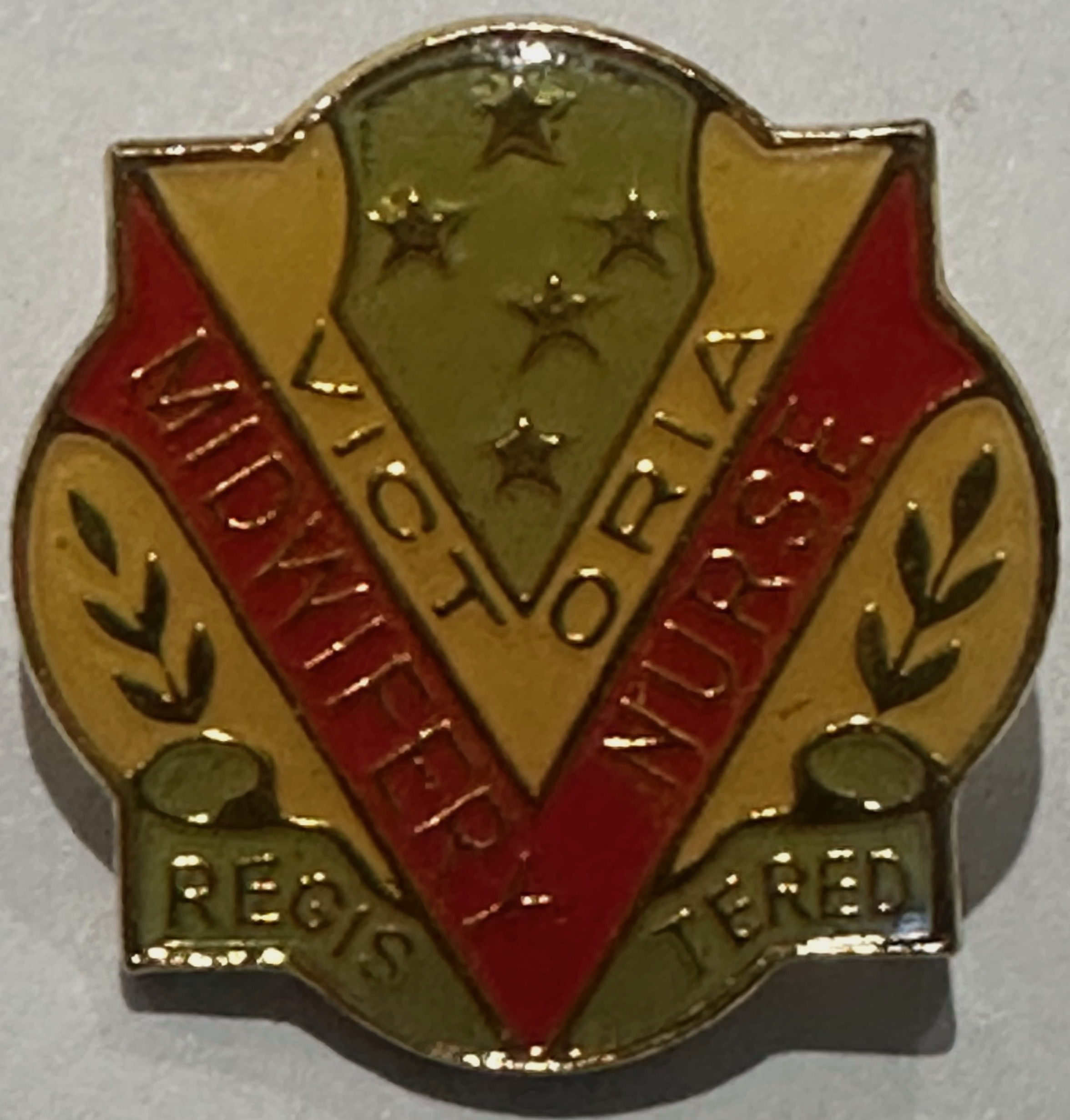
State Registered Midwife (RM) Badge (Red V) formerly awarded by the Victorian Nursing Council (1958-1993)

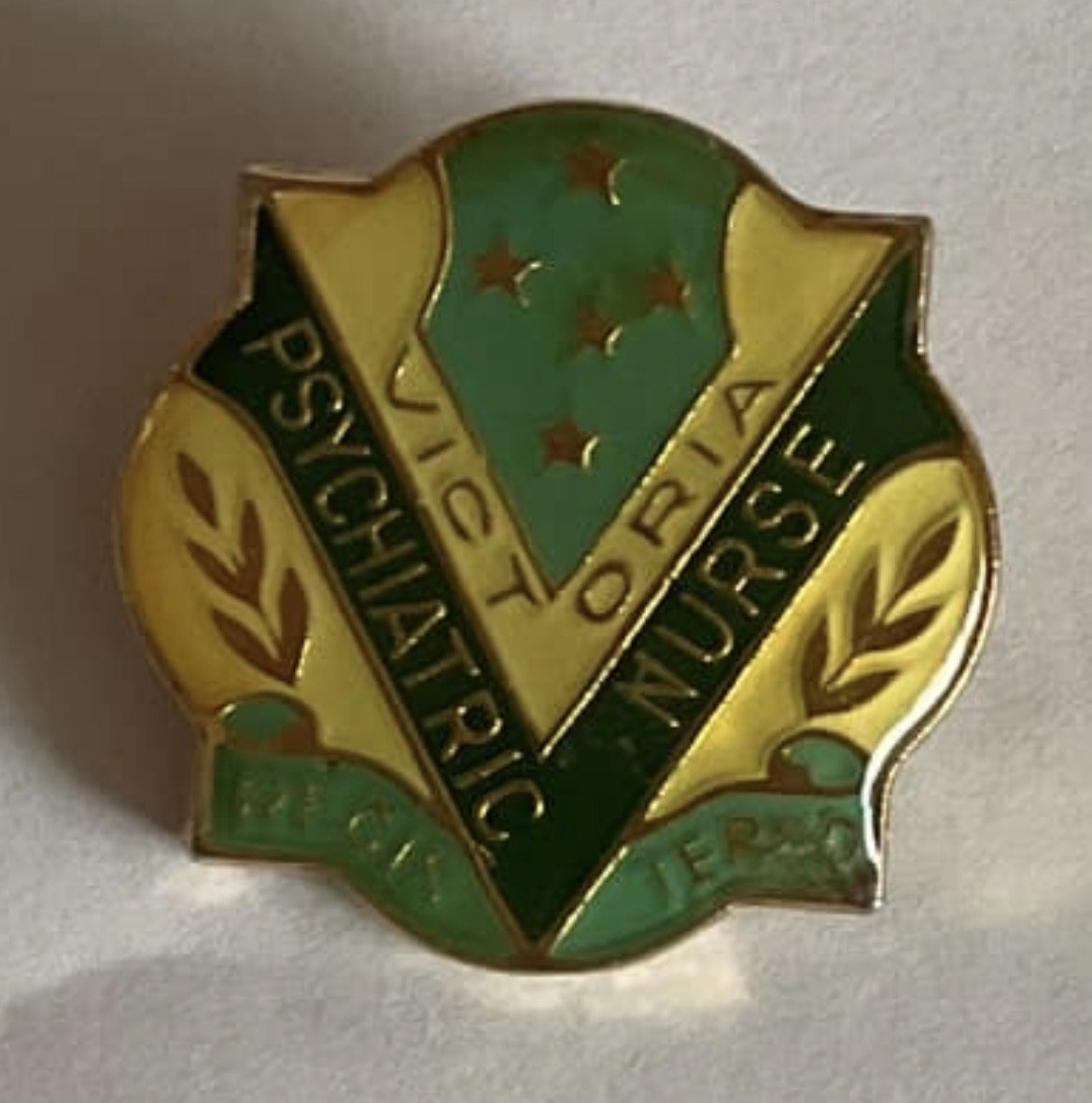
State Registered Psychiatric Nurse (RPN) Badge (Green V) formerly awarded by the Victorian Nursing Council (1958-1993)

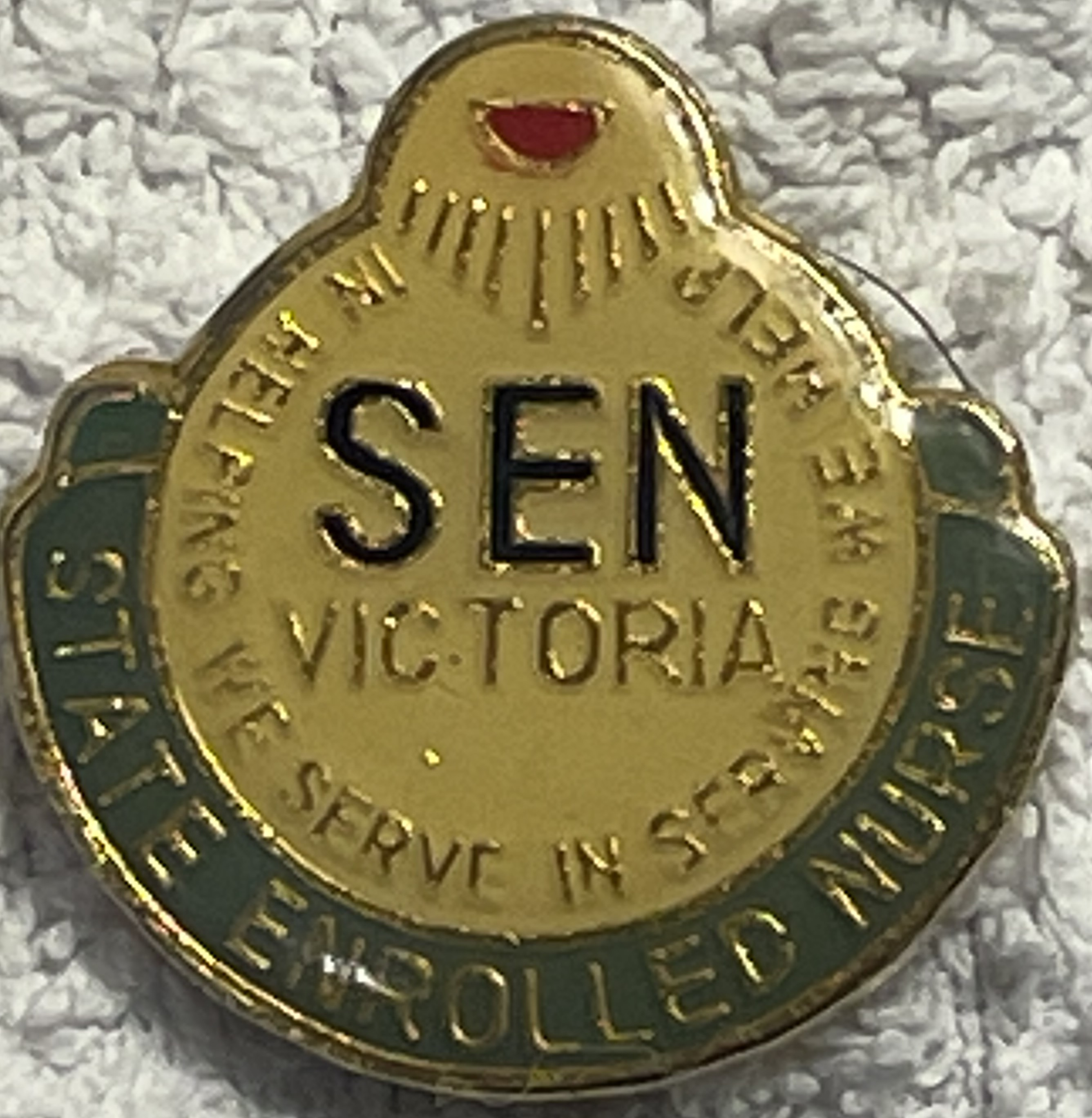
State Enrolled Nurse Badge formerly awarded by the Victorian Nursing Council from 1982 until 1993

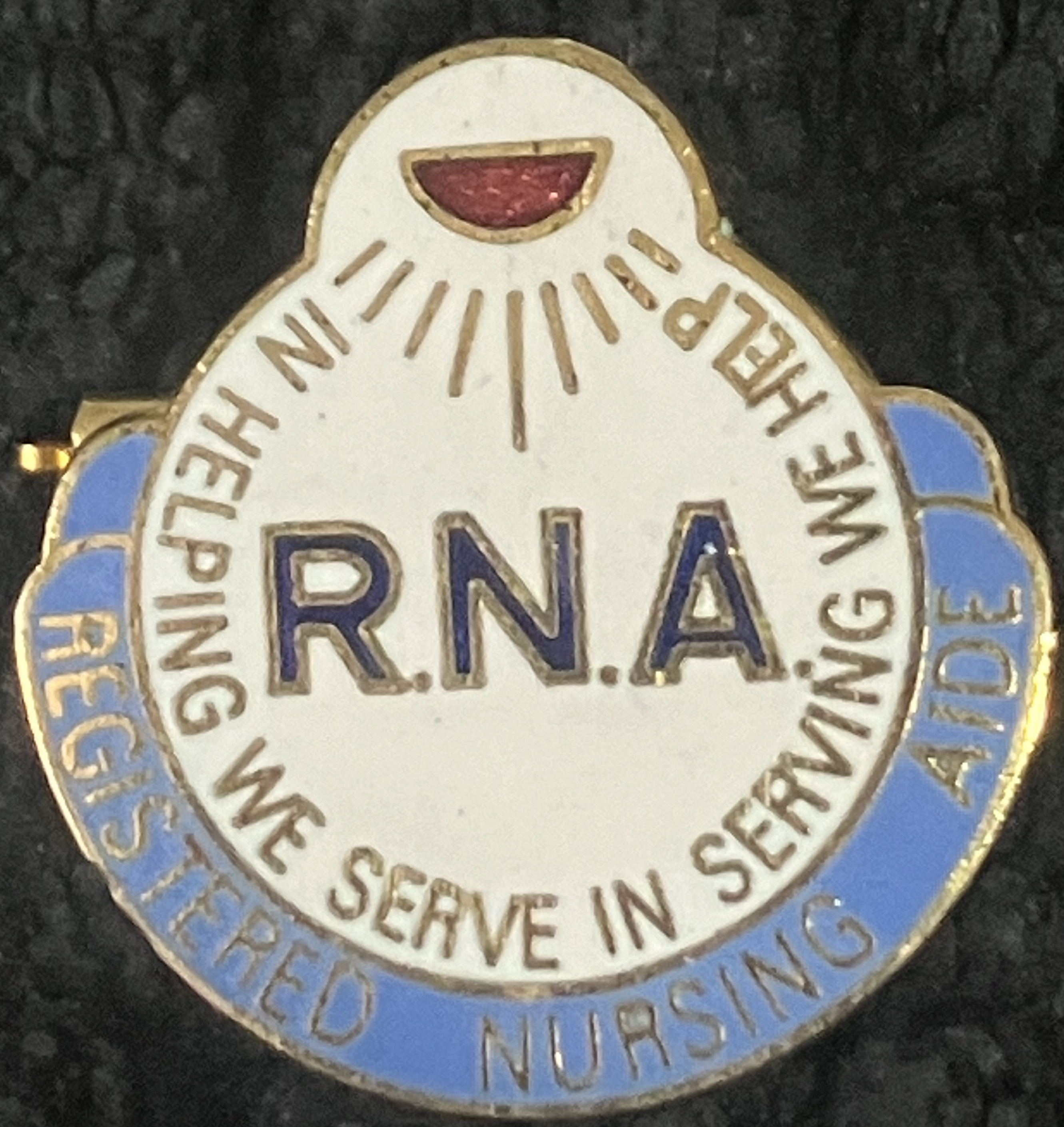
Registered Nurses Aide Badge awarded by the Victorian Nursing Council from 1958 until 1981. Mothercraft Nurses and Tuberculosis Nurses had variants of this design

==== Victorian General Nursing Training Hospital Badges ====
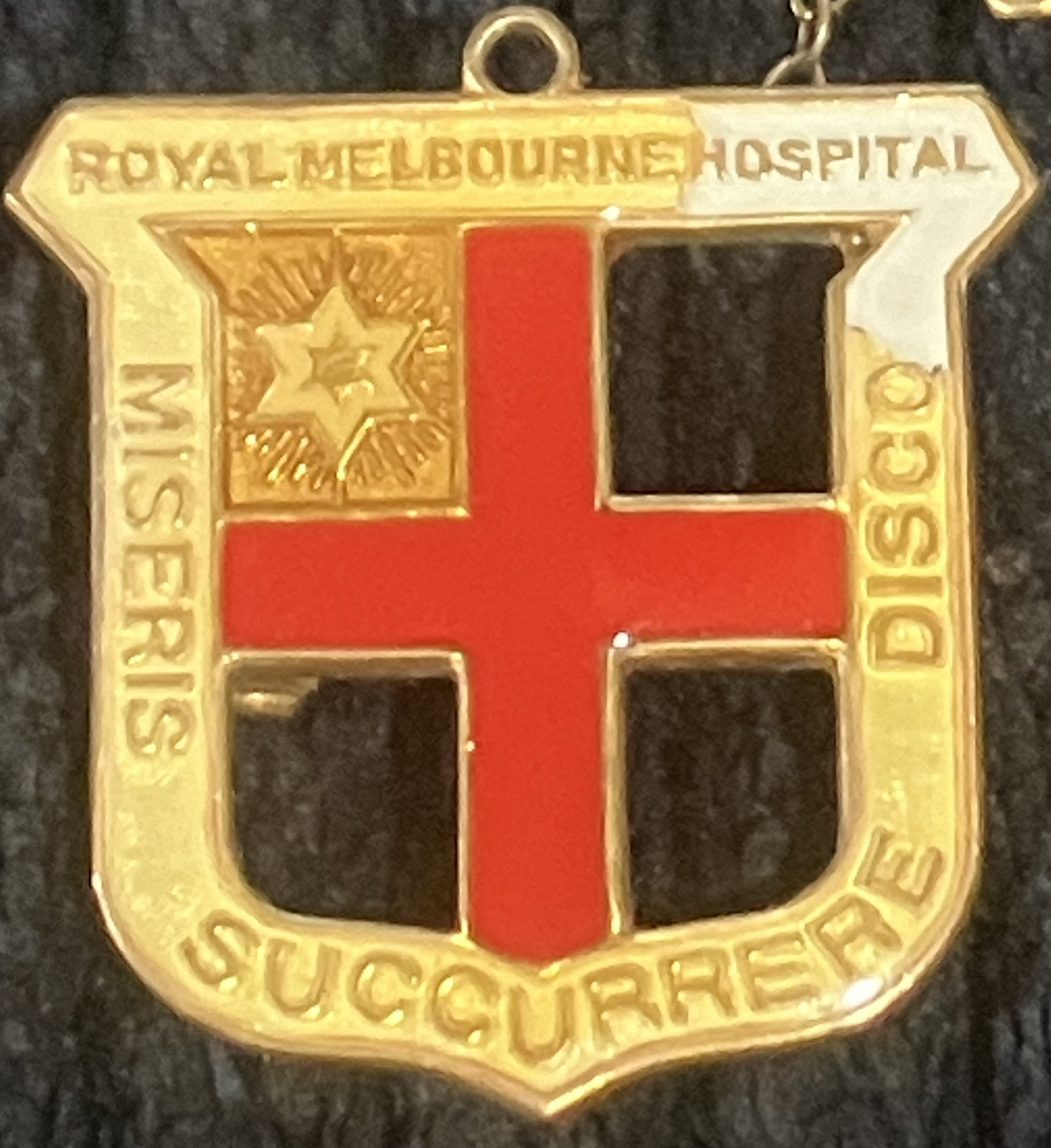
Royal Melbourne Hospital General Nursing Badge

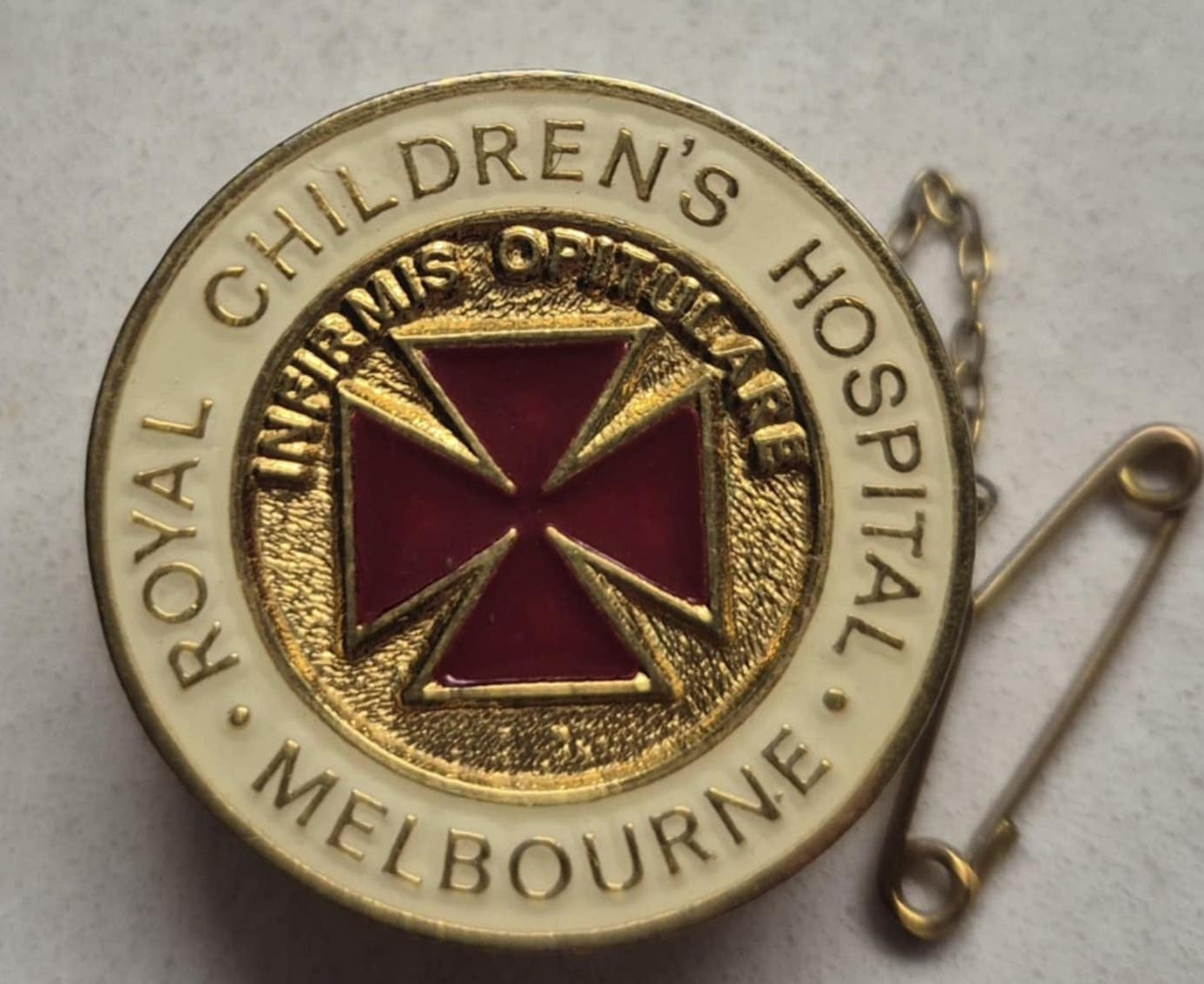
Royal Children's Hospital General Nursing Badge c1889-1987

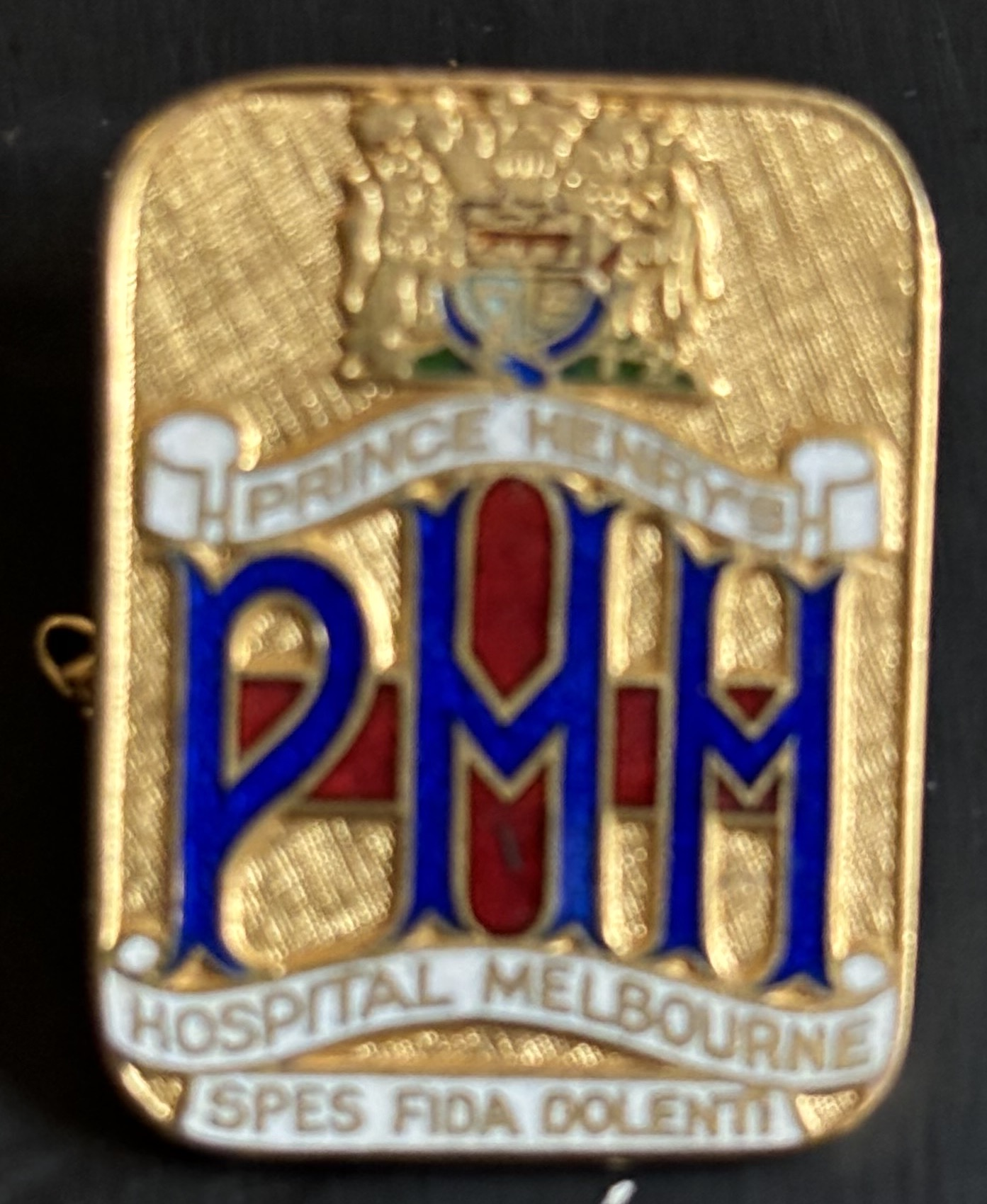
Prince Henry Hospital General Nursing Badge

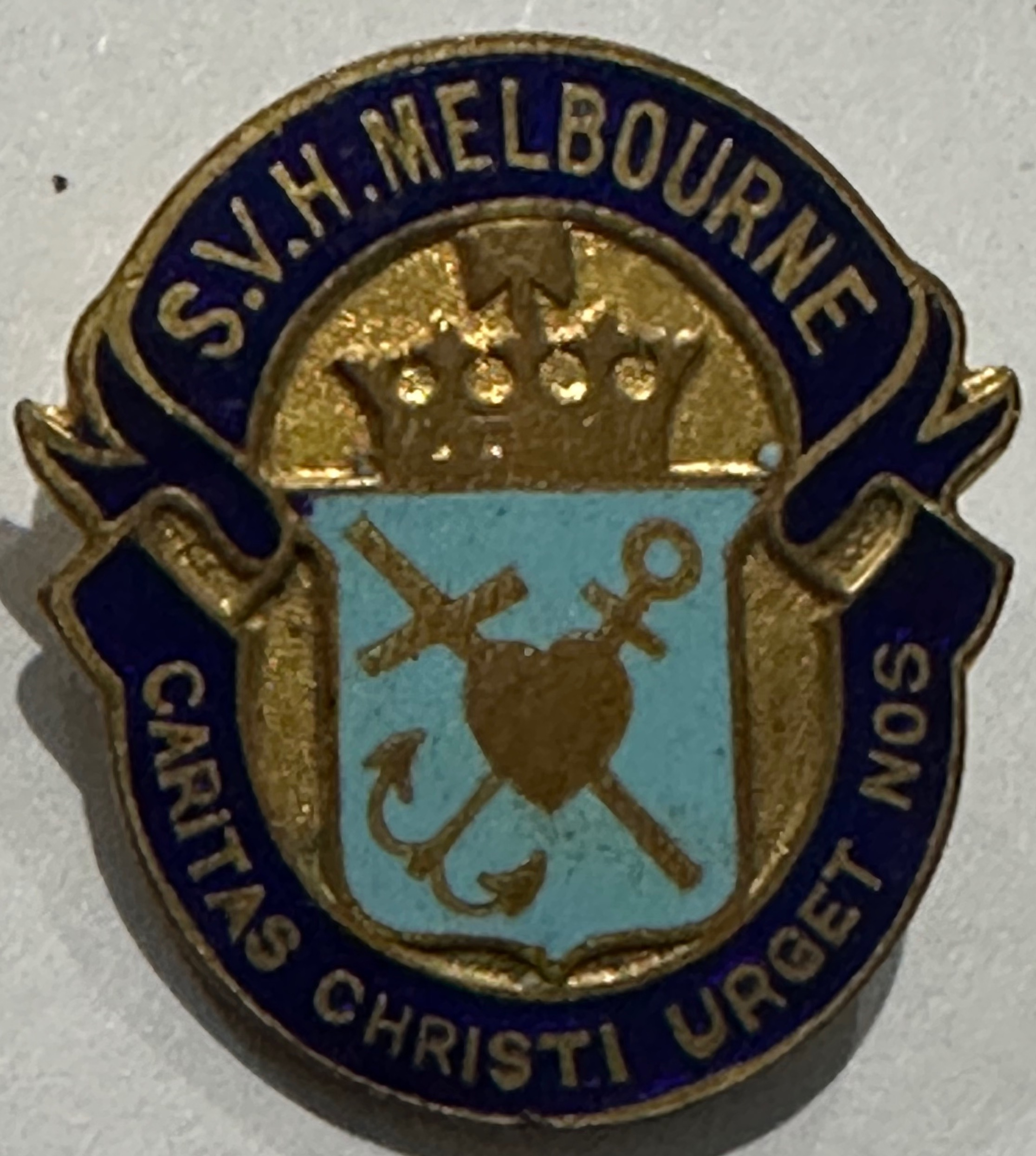
St Vincent's Public Hospital (Melbourne) General Nursing Badge

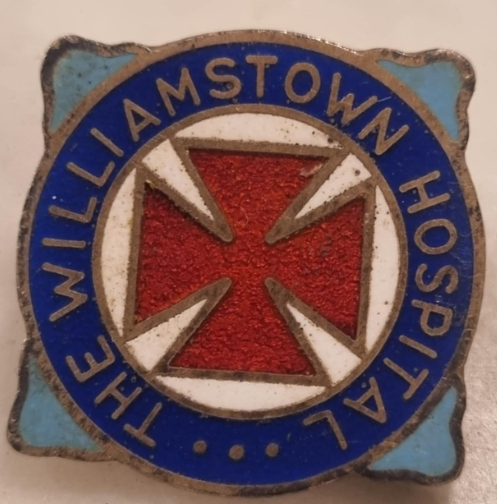
Williamstown Hospital General Nursing Training Badge

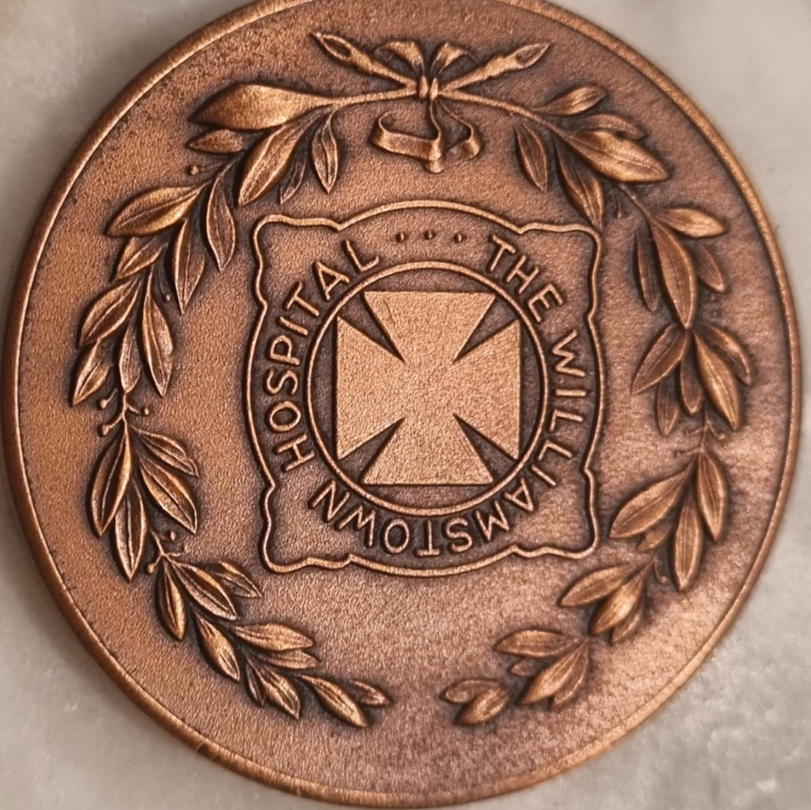
Williamstown Hospital Nurse Teachers Award

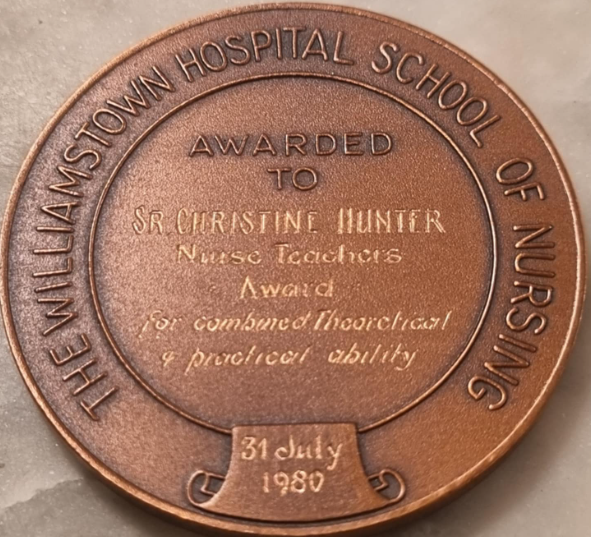
Williamstown Hospital Nurse Teachers Award (Obverse side)

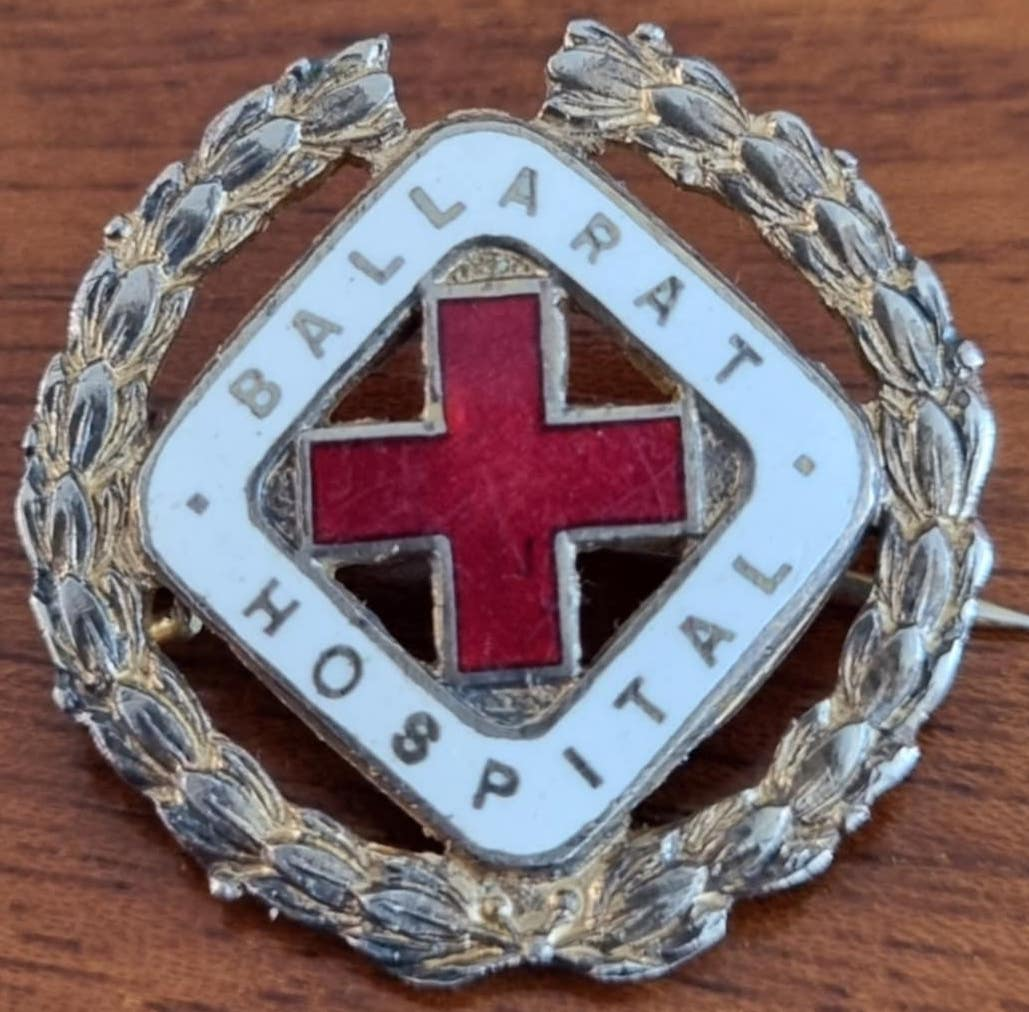
Ballarat Base Hospital General Nursing Training Badge

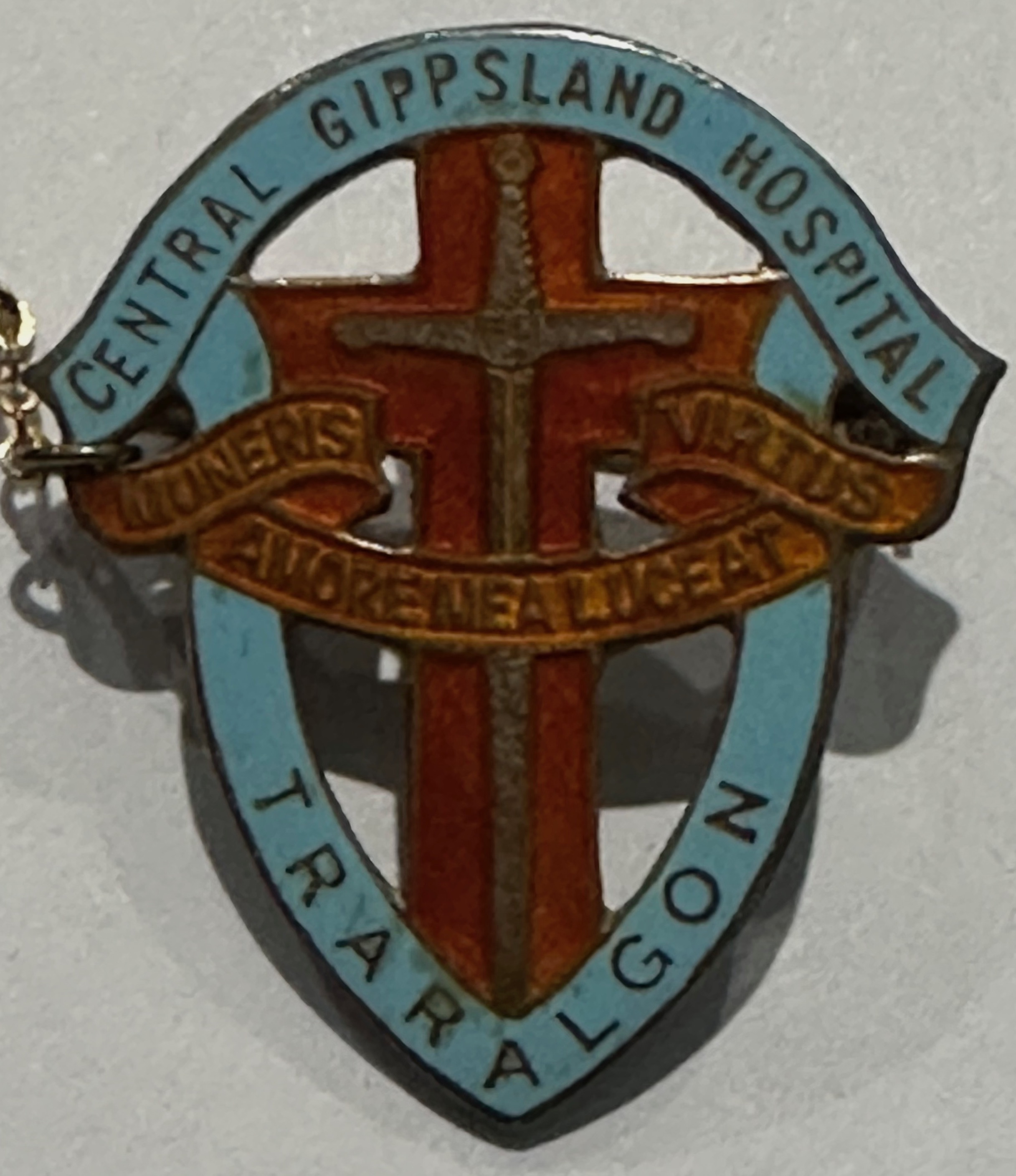
Central Gippsland Hospital General Nursing Badge

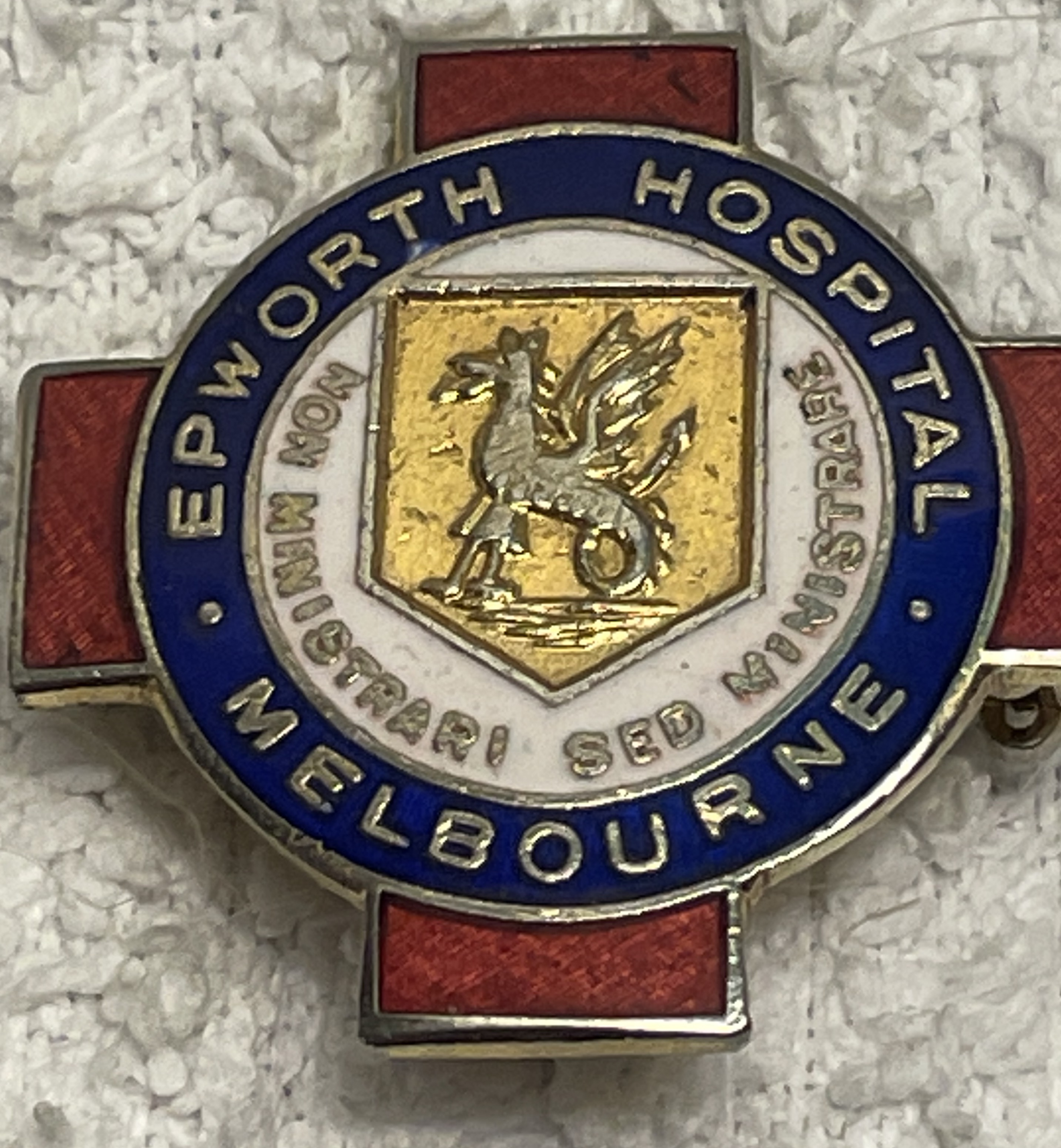
Epworth Private Hospital General Nursing Badge (1924-1988).

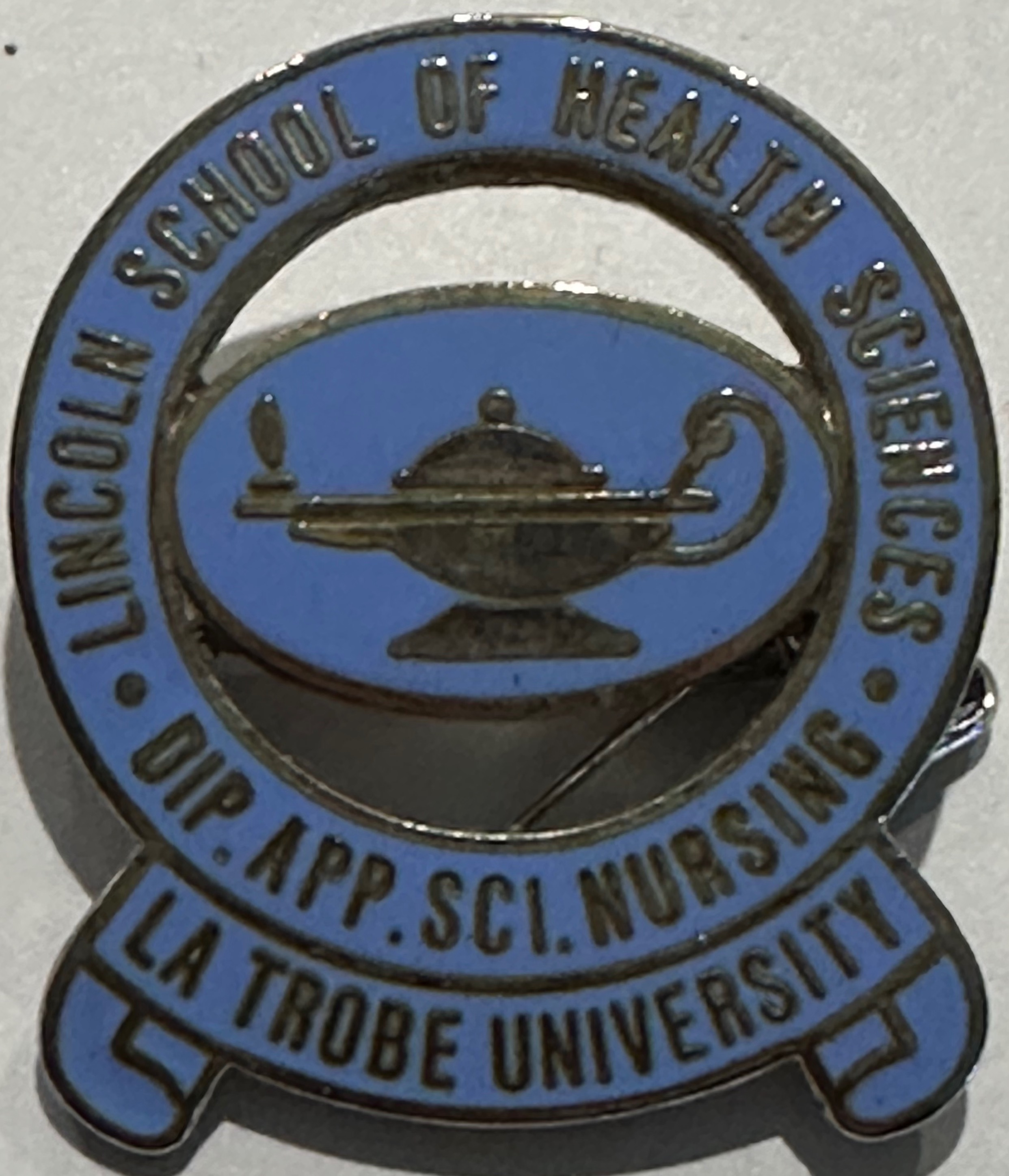
Lincoln Institute / La Trobe University General Nursing Badge

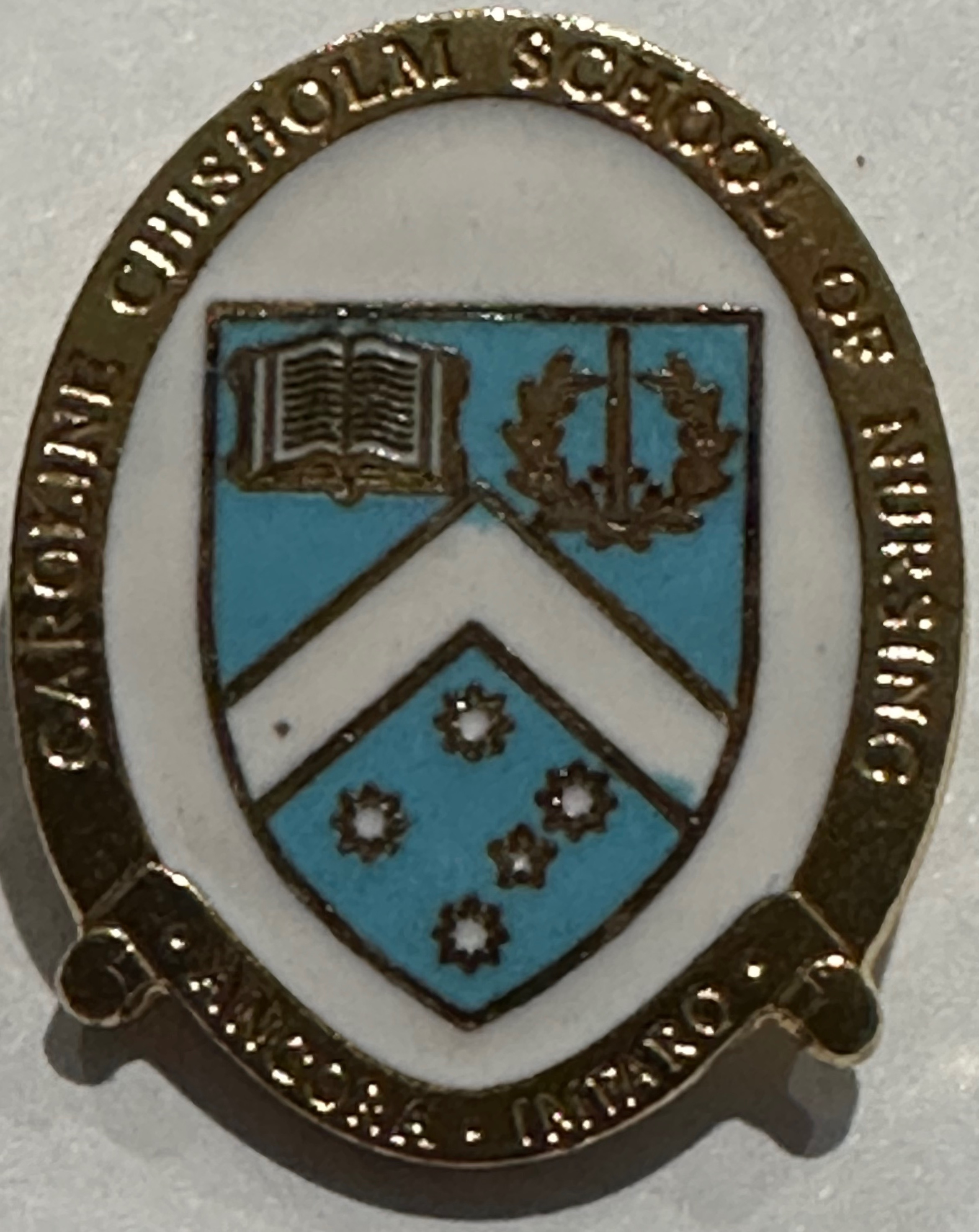
Caroline Chisholm Monash University General Nursing Badge (Peninsula Campus)

==== Victorian Post Basic Nursing Badges ====
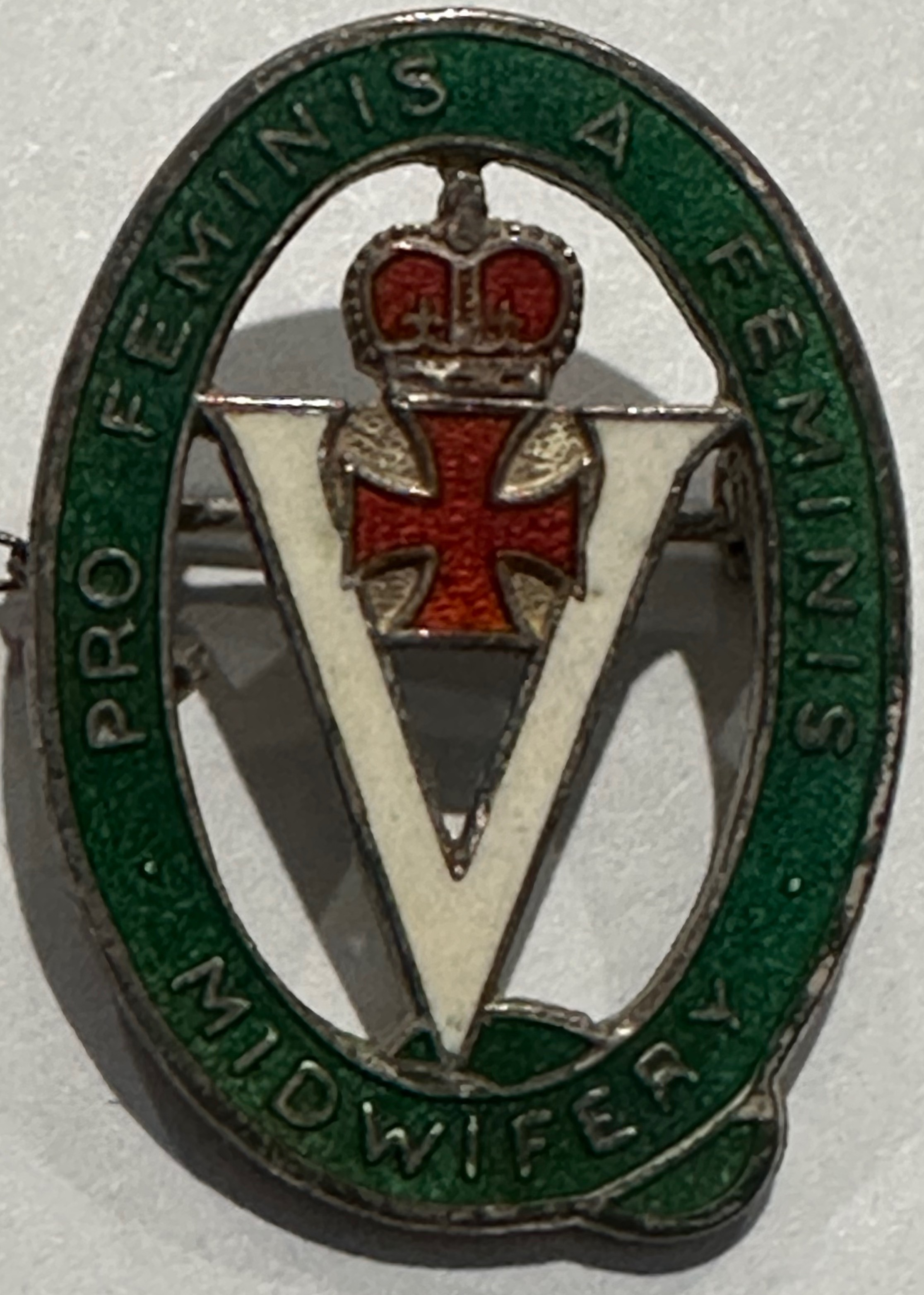
Queen Victoria Hospital (Melbourne) Midwifery Badge

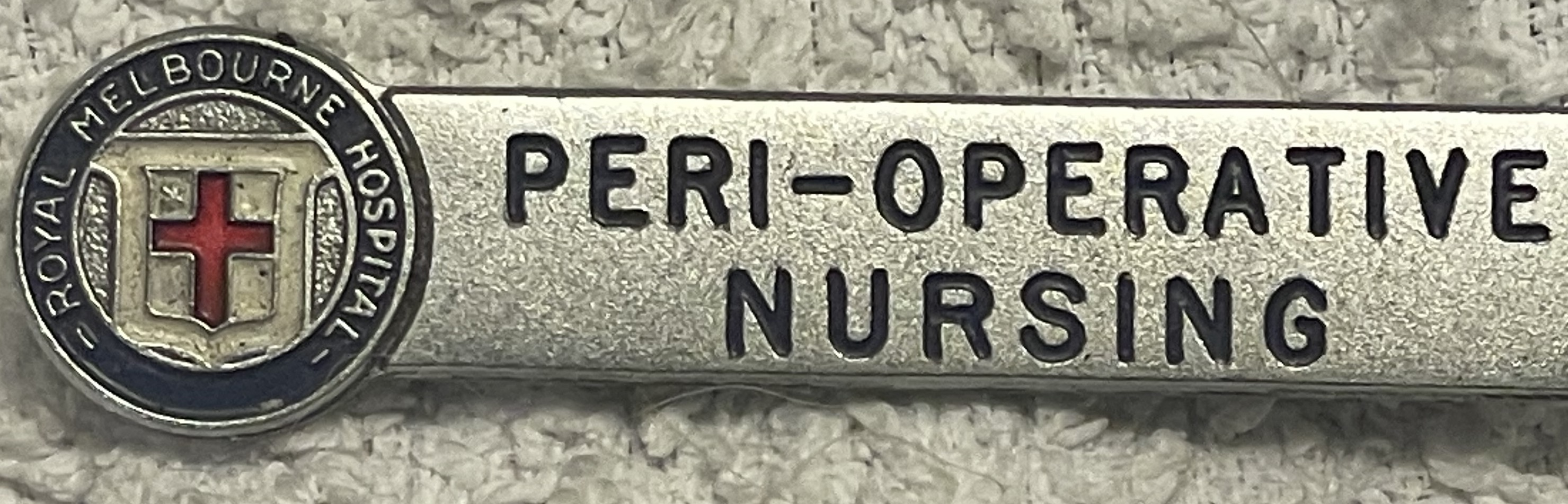
Badge awarded to graduates of a Royal Melbourne Hospital Post Basic Perioperative Nursing Course circa 1988, similar courses included Intensive care and Coronary Care.

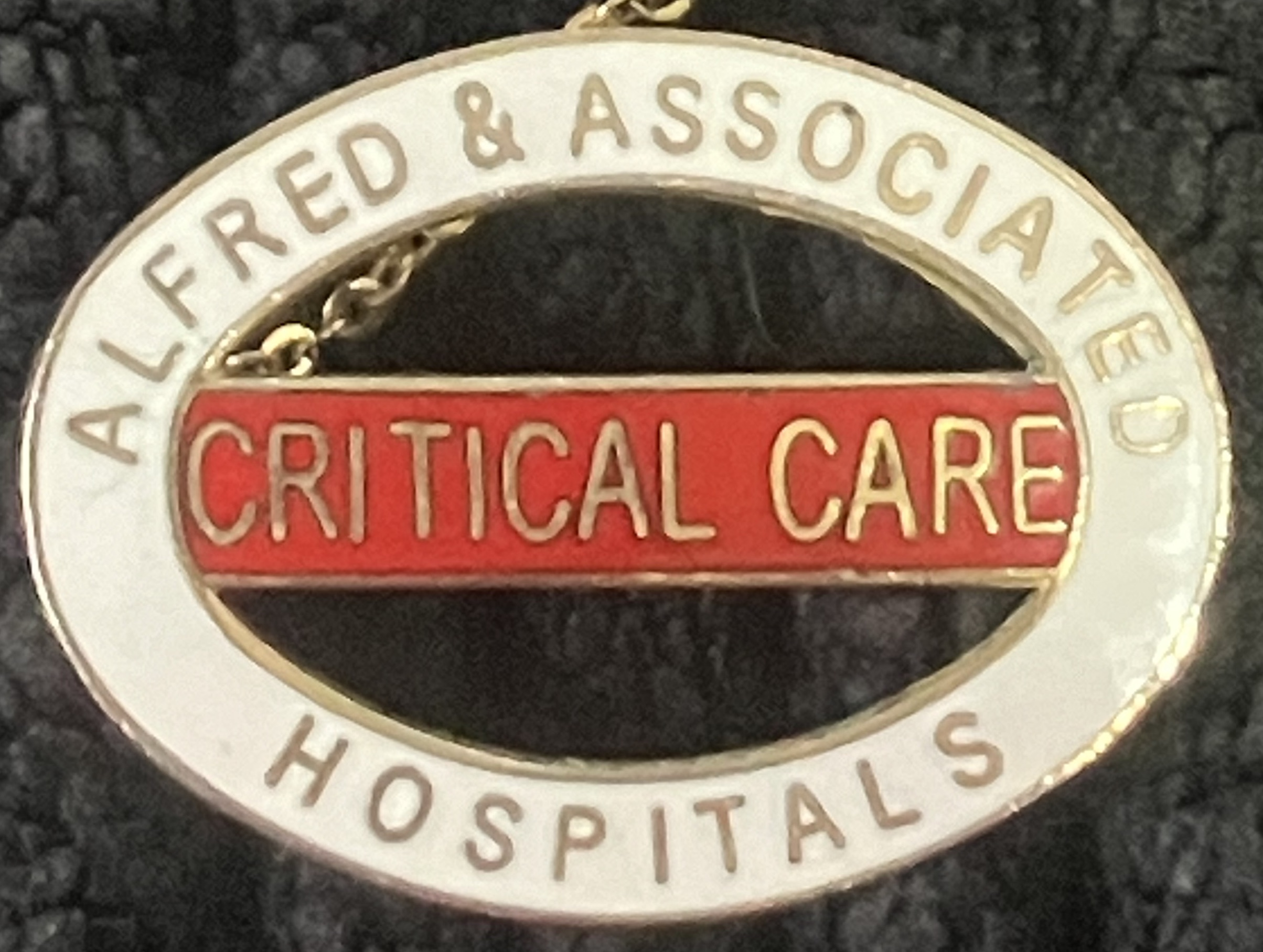
Post Graduate Nursing Badge for Critical Care (ICU Nursing ) Awarded by The Alfred Hospital

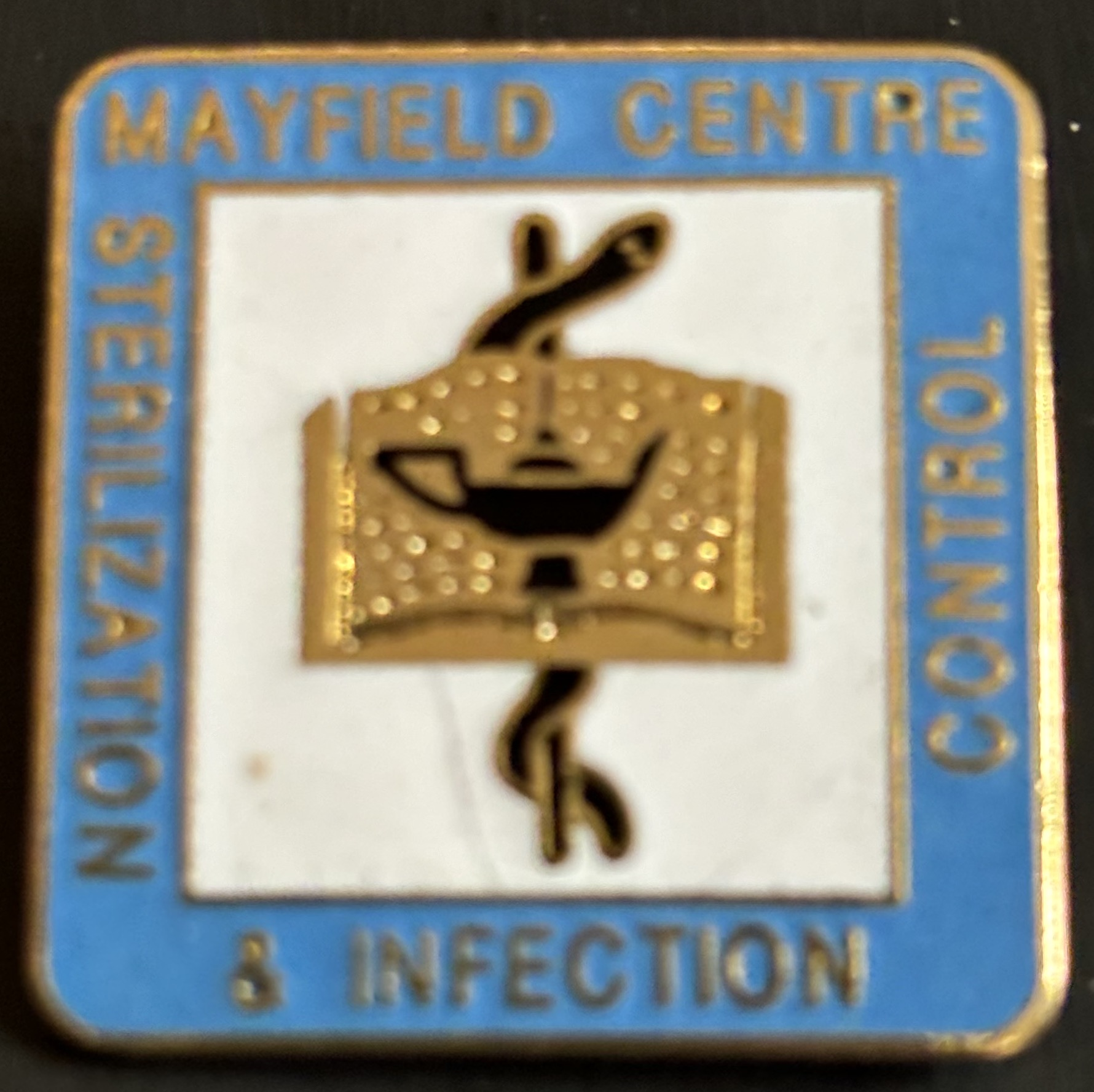
Post Basic Badge awarded by the Mayfield Centre for Sterilization and Infection Control

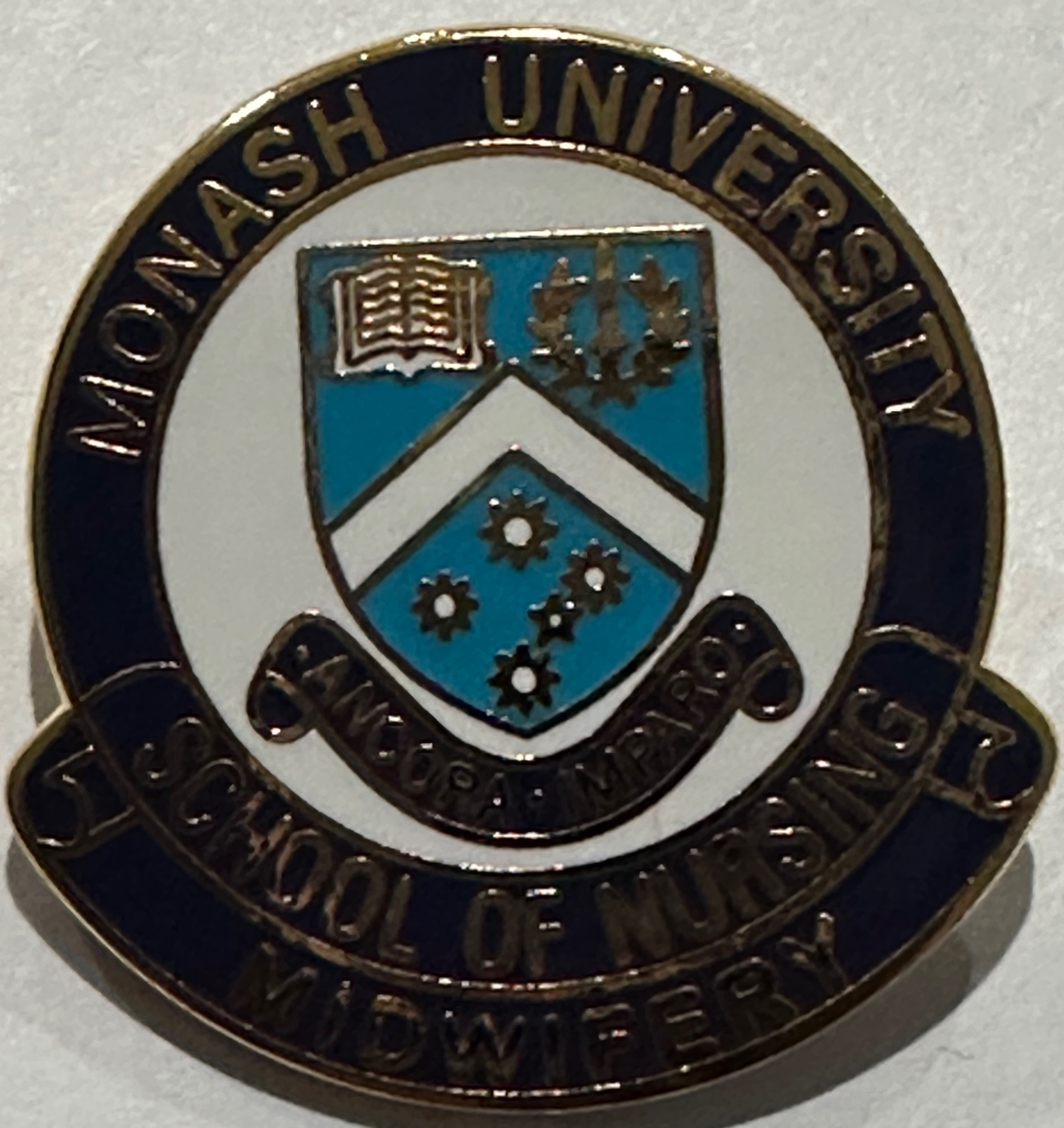
Monash University Midwifery Badge

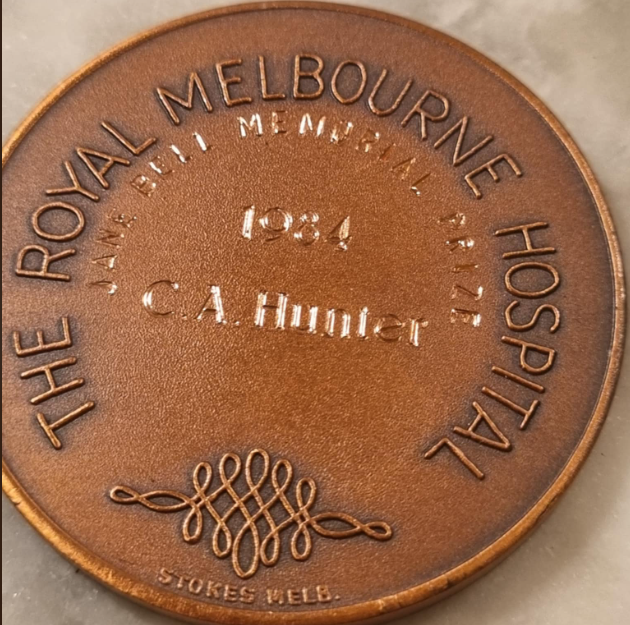
Royal Melbourne Hospital Jane Bell Memorial Prize (Post Graduate Dux)

==== Other types of badges ====
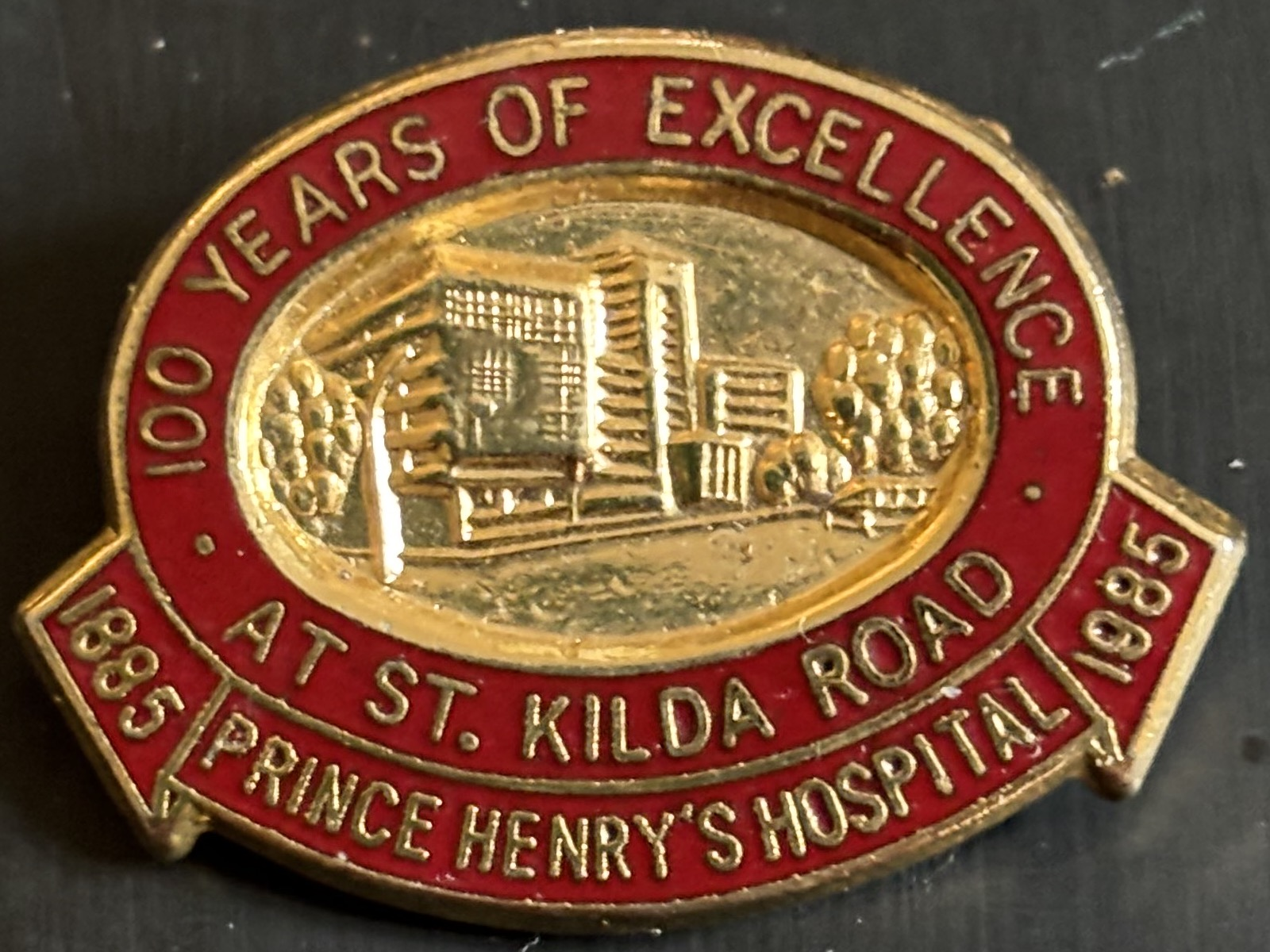
Badge to celebrate the centenary of the Prince Henry Hospital at St Kilda Road 1885 - 1985

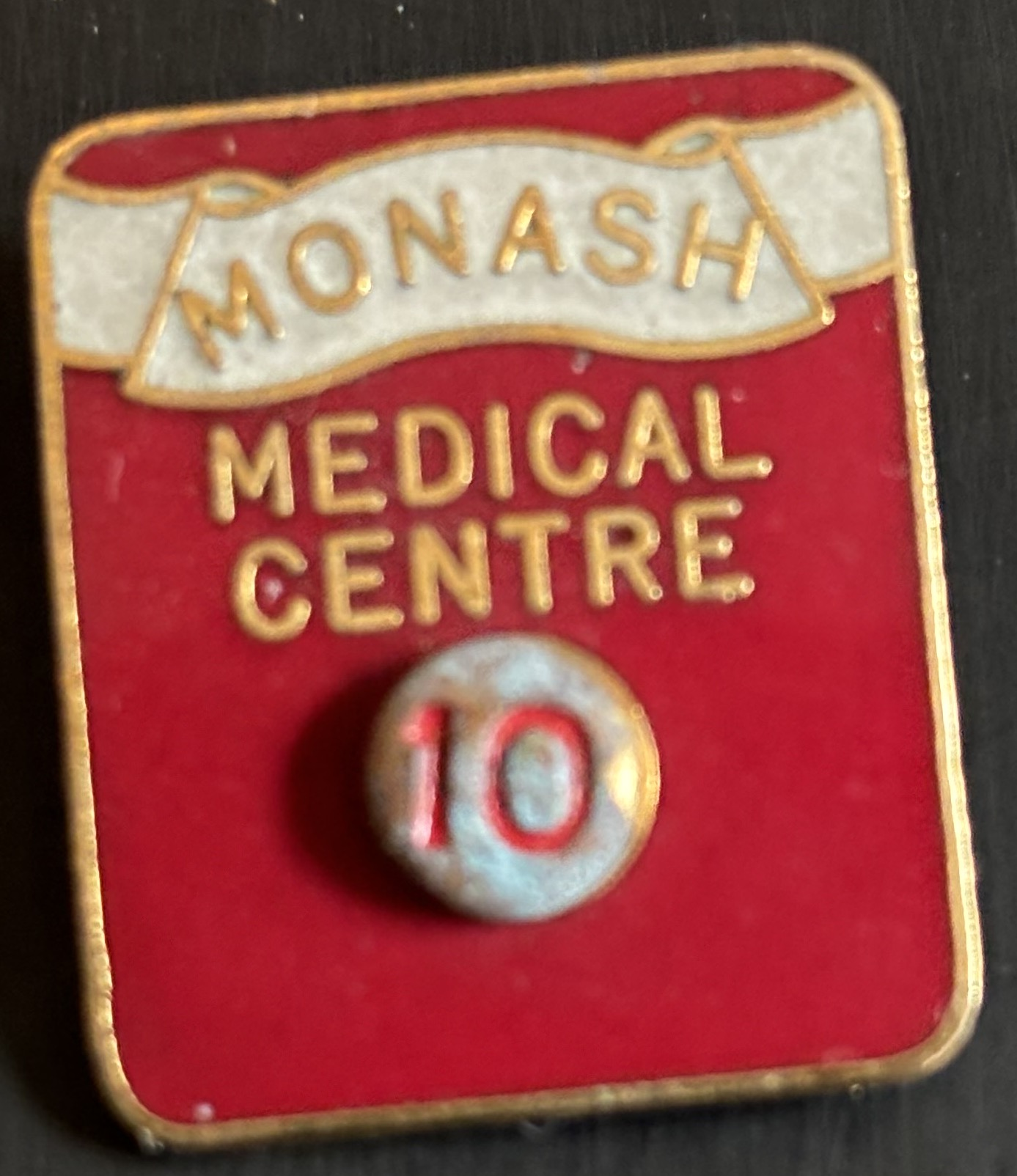
Badge to celebrate 10 years of service at the Monash Medical Centre

==== Men and General Nursing in Victoria ====
Men had been employed in nursing-type roles for many years in asylums, principally because of the view that it was unsuitable for women to be exposed to unsavoury behaviours that might occur in male psychiatric wards.

Soon after the outbreak of the Second World War the Nurses Board made a provision for the training of men in a three-year course, or one year in a training school followed by a further two years in an Army or Navy Hospital. After the war, and in response to a severe shortage of nurses, servicemen who had worked in nursing type roles during the conflict were eligible for registration pending successful completion of the nursing registration examinations.

The first ex-serviceman and indeed the first male to sit the Victorian final general nurses board examinations did so in 1946. Fairfield Infection Diseases Hospital decided to open its doors to train male nurses in 1946, partly in response to the critical shortage of registered nurses throughout the state. The Royal Melbourne Hospital noted in 1946 that the Royal Hobart Hospital had been training men in nursing for more than 10 years, moving with what can only be described as glacial haste accepted its first male trainee four years later in 1950. The medical superintendent noted that an advantage of having male nurses was that they would not be lost to the profession due to the "havoc" of marriage. The Austin Hospital had started employing men in nursing roles in the late 1930s, and it was reported that a male nurse with theatrical skills had produced an Ivor Novello play to raise funds for the hospital auxiliary in the late 1948.

Male nurses faced difficulties in gaining employment as general nurses for a number of reasons. Smaller hospitals would not consider them for employment claiming they were not as efficient or as sympathetic as female nurses, could only look after male patients, and were entitled to higher rates of pay than their female counterparts. The former matron of the Royal Melbourne Hospital Jane Bell opined that the most suitable employment for male nurses was in mental hospitals, and indeed this may explain the greater proportion of males to females in psychiatric hospitals prior to the 1980s. Mr A. Moran owned Olinda Private Hospital in Mildura in 1950, and was permitted to run the 12 bed hospital on condition that there was a double certificated sister employed at all times: men were forbidden to train as midwives. Edward Miller graduated from the St Vincent's Hospital School of Nursing in 1951. Two men graduated from the Repatriation General Hospital in March 1953, one of them, K. McMahon, topped the state examinations.

=== Tasmania ===
==== Tasmanian Nursing Badges ====
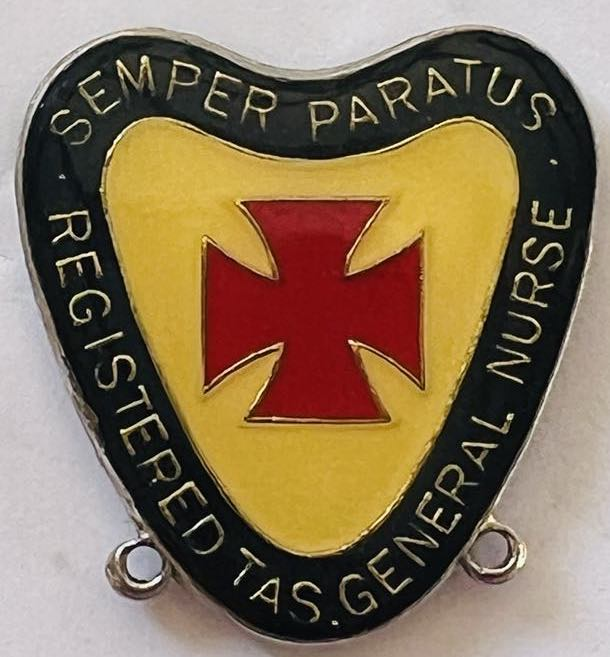
State Registration Badge formerly awarded by the Tasmanian Nursing Council

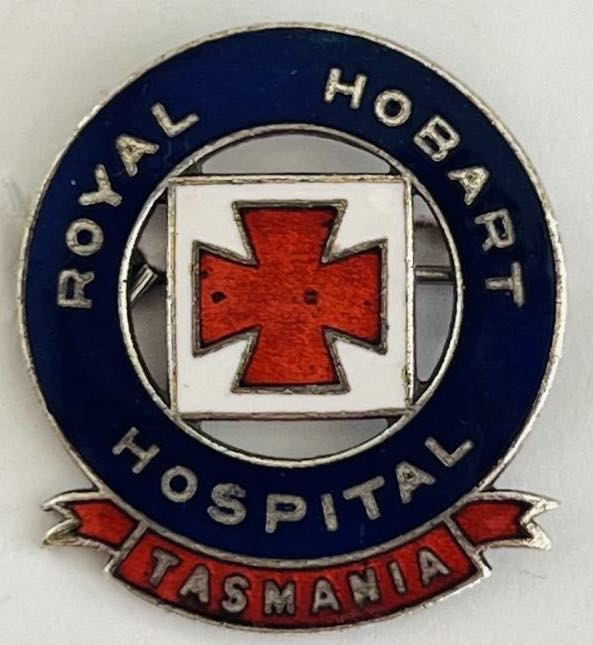
Royal Hobart Hospital General Nursing Badge circa 1980

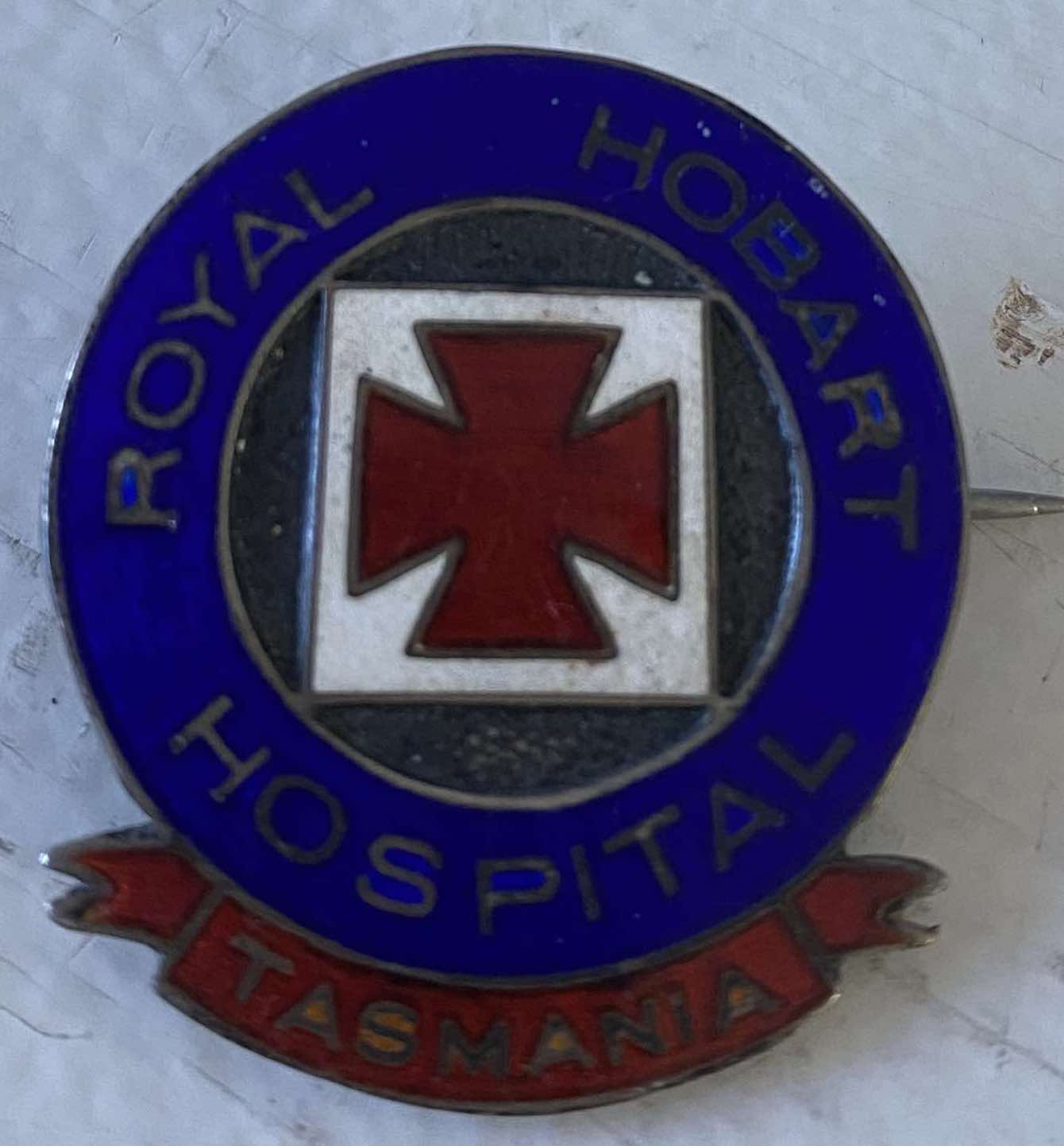
Older version of the Royal Hobart Hospital Badge from 1939

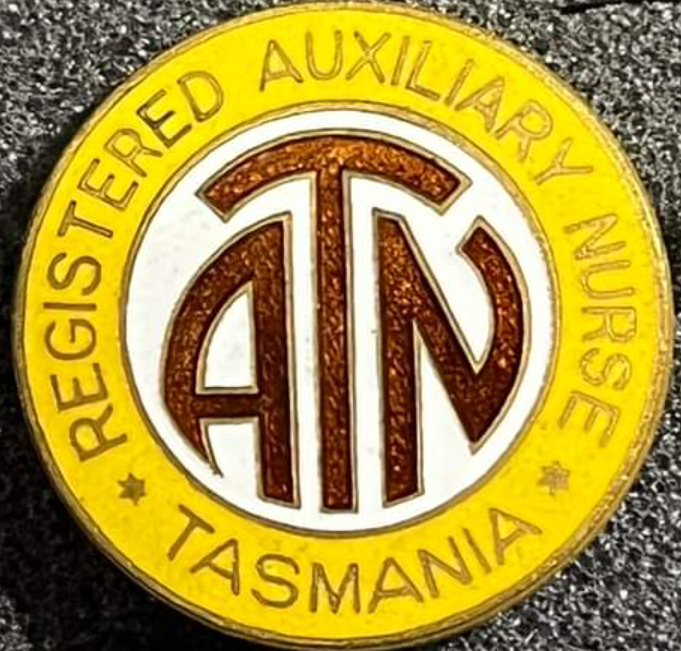
State Registration Auxiliary Nurse's Badge formerly awarded by the Tasmanian Nursing Council

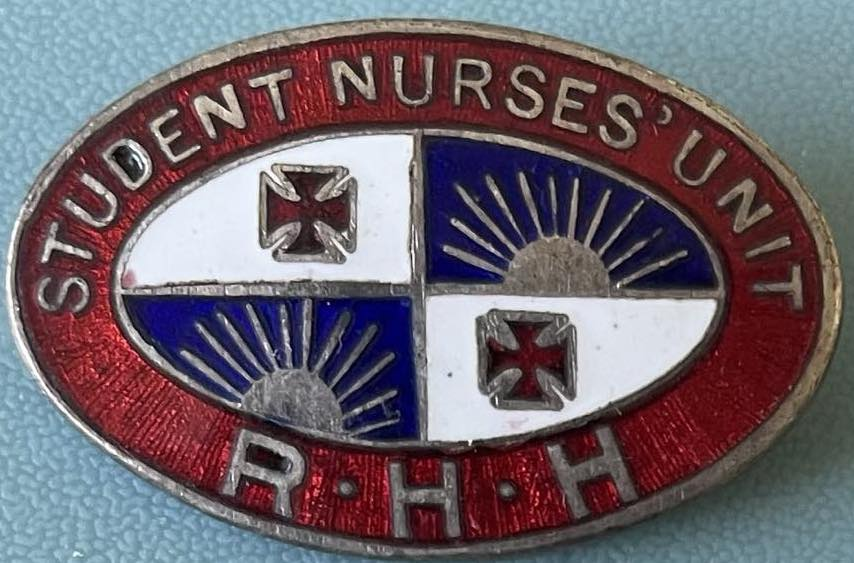
Royal Hobart Hospital Student Nurses Unit Badge

=== South Australia ===
The Private Hospital, Wakefield Street in Adelaide became the first training hospital for nurses in South Australia under Alice Tibbits (1854–1932) in the late 19th century.

==== South Australian Nursing Badges ====
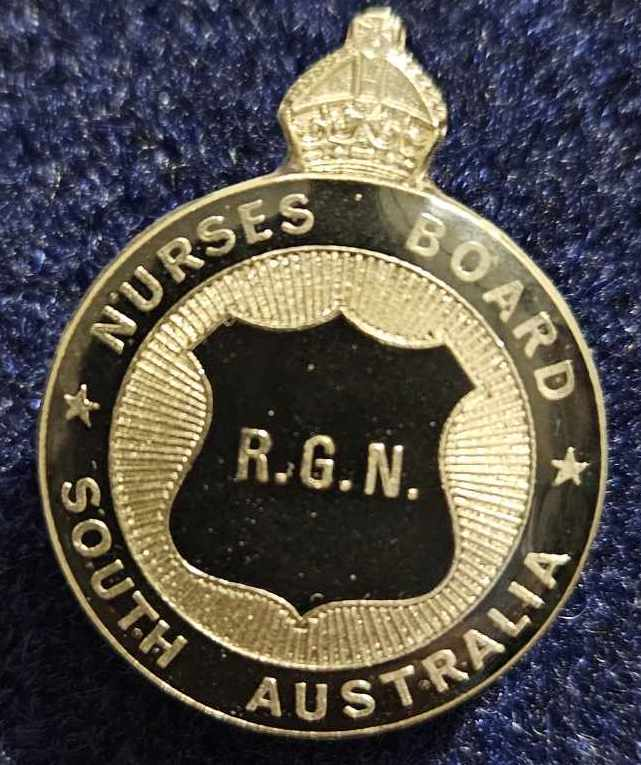
Registration badge formerly awarded by the South Australian Nurses Board

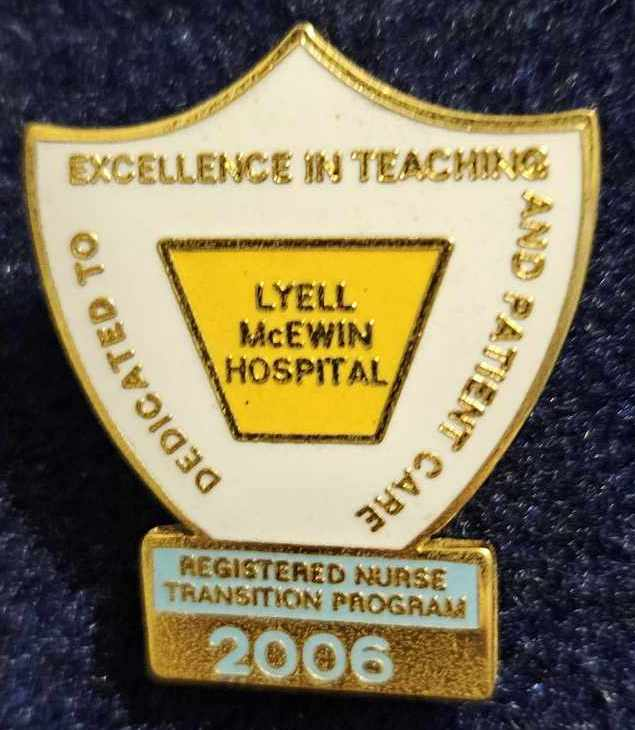
Hospital badge awarded by Lyell McEwin Hospital upon completion of the Graduate Nurse program (2006)

=== Western Australia ===
==== Western Australia Nursing Badges ====
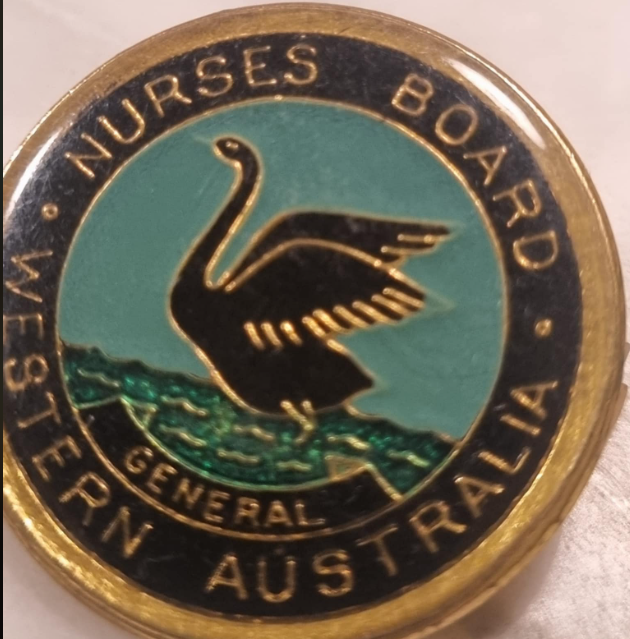
Western Australia Nursing Board General Nursing Registration Badge

=== Professional Organisations ===
==== Badges pertaining to Professional Organisations ====
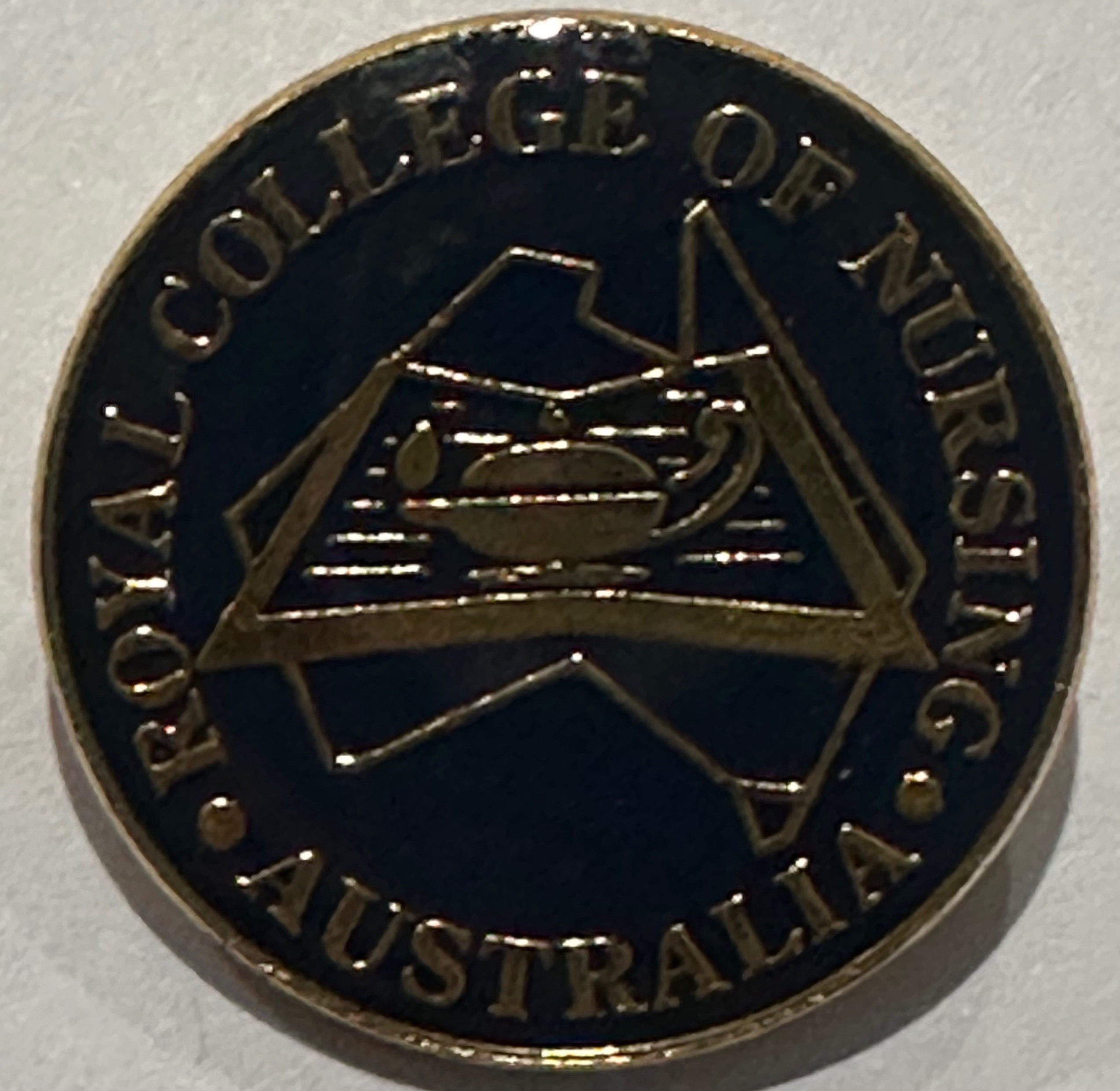
Royal College of Nursing Australia Badge pre 2000

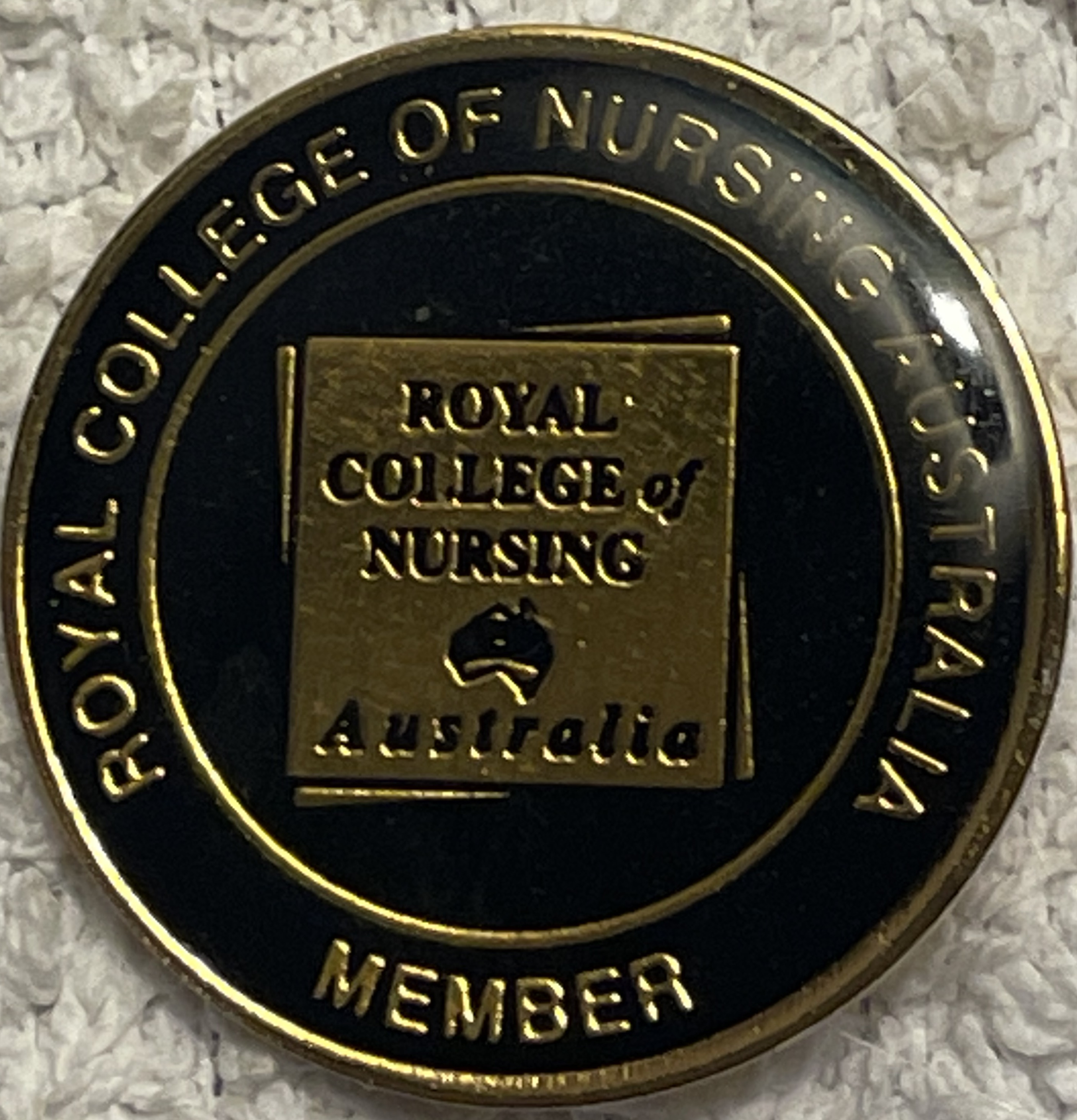
Royal College of Nursing Australia post 2000

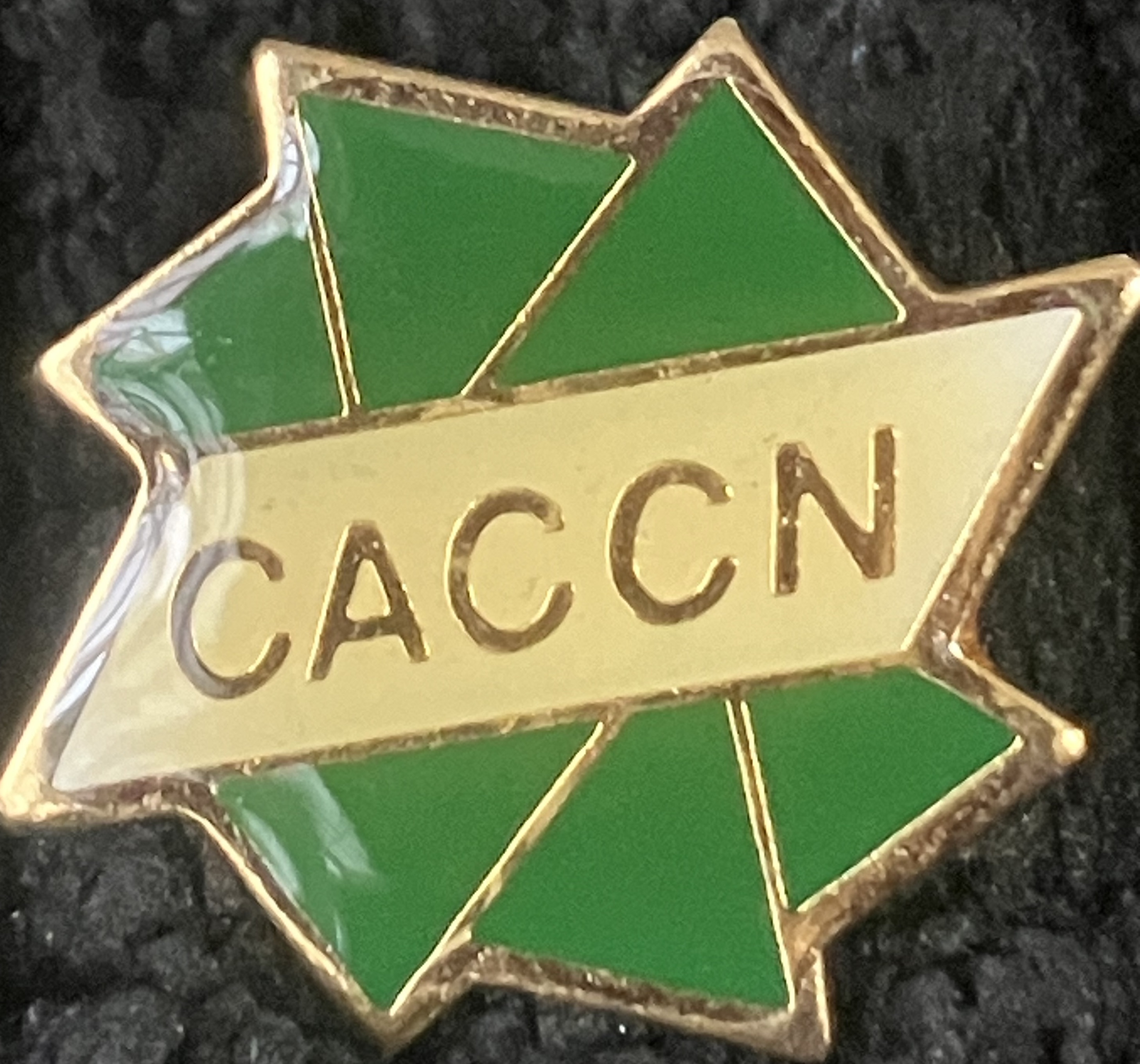
Confederation of Australian Critical Care Nurses Badge

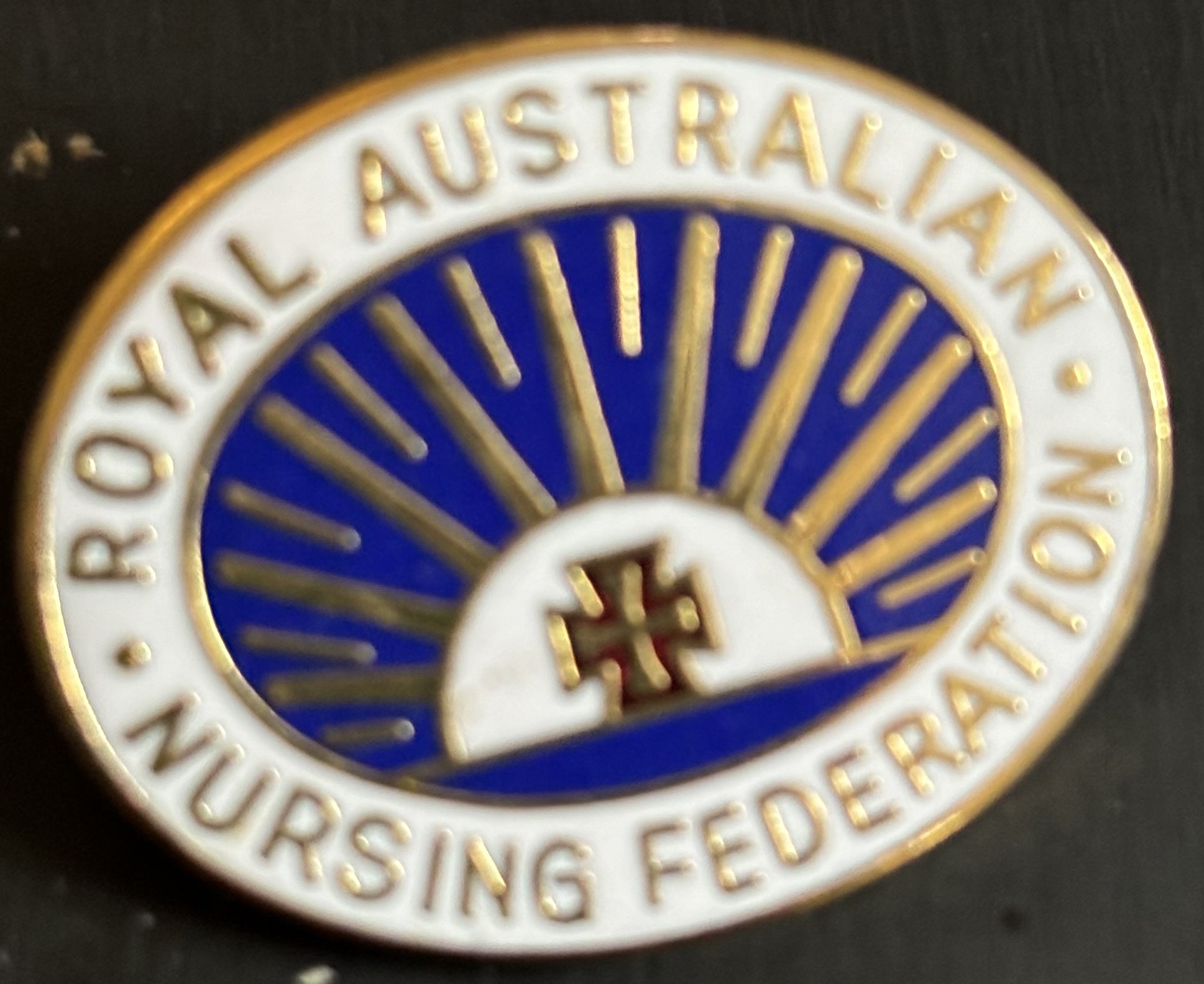
Membership badge of the Royal Australian Nursing Federation

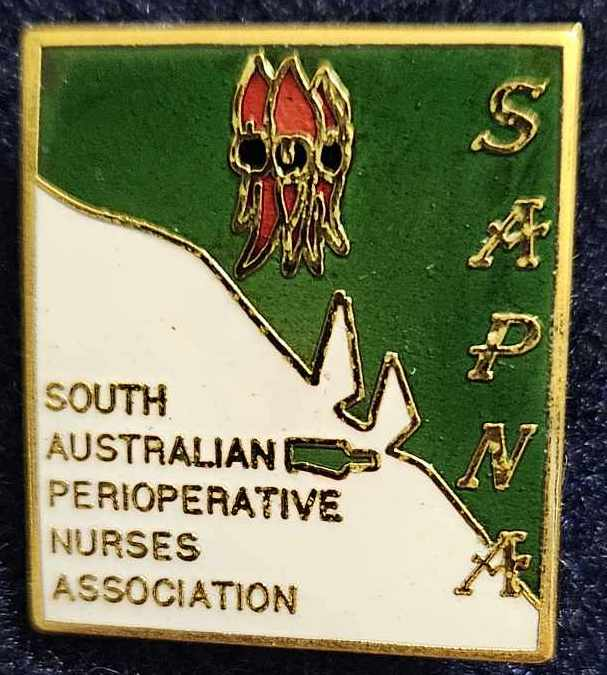
Membership badge of the South Australian Perioperative Nurses Association

== History of nursing education ==
Prior to the transfer of nursing education to the university sector, nurses were trained in accordance with the British model of a three-year apprentice style course of theory and practice instruction in hospital nursing schools and on the wards commencing with a 6-week preliminary training school (PTS) with the earliest accepted entry age being 17 years. First, second and third-year student nurses were often differentiated by the number of stripes on their uniform caps and or belts. Hospital-based examinations were held each year and a successful pass meant progression to the next year and a fail meant a student nurse might face termination: although this depended on the local hospital policy. Three years of student nursing culminated in final year exams: trial final exams were set by the training school ("hospital finals") prior to a state universal registration examination ("state finals") administered by the respective state registration body.

This apprentice-style training created a situation whereby different siloed streams of nursing were provided. Prior to the adoption of the policy that general nursing was to be the foundation qualification for all forms of nursing, it was possible at various times to train and be registered as a psychiatric nurse (RPN) or as a mental retardation nurse (RMRN) (Note: This is a deprecated historical term despite the context of the legally correct usage for that period.) or midwife (RM) without general nursing training. Graduate Nurses of such courses were restricted to that branch of nursing for which they were trained. Despite this, it was previously possible for an RPN or RMRN to apply for registration as an enrolled nurse without additional training based on their existing experience. This practice has been discontinued by APHRA as single qualification courses are no longer offered in Australia and those with a single qualification must now complete a comprehensive course in general nursing if they wish to practice in this area.

Student Nurses were paid employees of the parent hospital and their conditions of employment were consistent with the Registered Nurses Award. If a student nurse missed time off through sick leave over the three years of training this time was added on to be worked at the end of the three years to comply with meeting the prescribed hours of practicum. Hospitals awarded distinctive badges and veils for women upon graduation. In addition, state registering authorities awarded a badge of registration in recognition of passing the state final exams. These were generally worn with pride on the uniform collars.

As early as the 1930s, attempts were made to establish university-credentialed nursing courses in Australia, most notably by the director of nursing at the Royal Melbourne Hospital and the University of Melbourne. As recently as the 1980s, Sandra Stacy, one of the first Australian nurses to attain a PhD enrolled in a school of anthropology to submit her thesis.

In the late 1970s, the Royal College of Nursing Australia pioneered a course that became the Diploma of Applied Science (Nursing), awarded by the Lincoln Institute in Melbourne (now part of La Trobe University) and Cumberland College of Health Sciences in Sydney (now part of the University of Sydney). The transfer of nursing education to the university sector continued throughout the 1980s, and gradually hospital schools ceased operating. In the early 1990s, universities finally granted nursing education the same status as allied health, and awarded bachelor degrees in nursing rather than diplomas for entry-level courses.

The first move towards baccalaureate recognition was the development of the Bachelor of Applied Science (Advanced Nursing), a postgraduate degree that required registration as a registered nurse as a prerequisite to admission, and completion of 16 units. This course is no longer offered, and has been superseded by the transition of "post basic courses" conducted by various hospitals as a form of in-service training to the tertiary sector. The Australian College of Nursing still runs postgraduate certificate courses for nurses in many specialities.

The transfer of nursing education to the university sector from the hospital setting was the result of long-time efforts by leaders in Australian nursing, notably, pioneer nurse educator Merle Parkes. This was regarded with concern by some parts of the medical profession who regarded the development of highly trained professional nurses as a threat to their authority regarding the delivery of high-level health care. Some nurses themselves opposed the transfer on the grounds that "hands-on experience in hospitals" would be lost. There has been a gradual reduction in hospital-based practicum sessions in University courses: hospitals now charge tertiary providers for student nurse placements, and governments apply funding quotas for enrolments. The transfer to tertiary education was championed as an exercise of female emancipation. In a society that still regarded feminism as a conspiracy that opposed a predominantly essentialist view of gender within society, this was opportunely exploited by conservative factions within medical industrial bodies. A number of conservative people believe appropriate and separate gender roles should be respected as either "god-given" or part of the "natural order". In this case, nursing is regarded as a "female" profession and medicine as a "male" profession. Men in nursing, or so-called "male nurses" often are subject to stereotyping. For example, the Nurses Registration Acts of both Tasmania and Victoria in the 1950s expressly forbade men from training as or practising as midwives, and was not repealed until the mid-1970s.

== See also ==
- Australian College of Nursing
- Nurses and Midwives Tribunal, superseded complaints forum

== See also ==
- Timeline of nursing history in Australia and New Zealand
