= Merle Parkes =

Australian nurse educator (1927–2024)

Merle Parkes AM
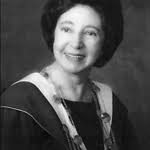
- Born: 19 May 1927; Kogarah, New South Wales, Australia
- Died: 2 September 2024 (aged 97); Leura, New South Wales, Australia
- Occupation: Nurse educator
- Years active: 1945–1993
- Known for: Instrumental in affecting change from solely hospital-only training, to formal nursing degrees within tertiary institutions.
- Notable work: A Professional Pilgrimage: a History of the Florence Nightingale Committee of Australia, 1946-1993
- Honours: Member of the Order of Australia

Merle Elecia Parkes, AM (19 May 1927 – 2 September 2024) was an Australian pioneer nurse educator who spent the bulk of her extensive career championing quality education for nurses in Australia. Parkes was eventually instrumental in affecting change from solely hospital-only training, to formal nursing degrees within tertiary institutions. In 1979, under Parkes's guidance, the Western Australian Institute of Technology (later Curtin University of Technology) became the first Australian tertiary institution to receive approval for a nursing degree program, which catalysed a National shift from hospital-based training to university-based education for the nursing profession.

Parkes received her initial nursing training in New South Wales, before moving to Western Australia in 1962, and subsequently to Tasmania in 1983 for the remainder of her career.

Parkes was awarded the AM – Member of the Order of Australia – in the Australia Day Honours list in 1982 for services to nursing.

In 2002, her book A Professional Pilgrimage: a History of the Florence Nightingale Committee of Australia, 1946-1993 was published.

Parkes died in Leura, New South Wales on 2 September 2024, at the age of 97.

== Career timeline ==
=== 1945 – 1961 ===
- 1945 – 1949 General nurse training, Ryde District Hospital, Sydney.
- 1949 – 1950 Midwifery training, Women's Hospital, Crown Street, Sydney.
- 1950 Infant Welfare Certificate, the Royal Society for the Welfare of Mothers and Babies.
- 1951 – 1953 Junior Sister in private wing, and Sister in Charge of medical ward, Women's Hospital.
- 1954 – 1956 Sister, Royal North Shore Hospital, Sydney. Sister Educator, PTS (Preliminary Training School). Ward Sister in several departments, including medical, surgical, orthopaedic and children's nursing. Second Sister-In-Charge, Central Sterilising Department.
- 1956 – 1959 See Sabbaticals.
- 1960 – 1961 Tutor in Charge, School of Nursing, St George Hospital, Kogarah, New South Wales.

=== 1962 – 1983 ===
- 1962 – 1970 Principal Nurse Educator, School of Nursing, Royal Perth Hospital, Western Australia.
- 1970 – 1973 Principal, Western Australian Branch, College of Nursing Australia.
- 1974 – 1983 Inaugural Head, Department of Nursing within the School of Health Sciences, Western Australian Institute of Technology (WAIT) which became Curtin University of Technology in 1982. During this time, undertook study tour to four institutions offering nursing degree programs in the UK and North America.

=== 1983 – 1993 ===
- 1983 – 1993 Head, School of Nursing Studies, Tasmanian State Institute of Technology, Launceston, Tasmania. This later became the University of Tasmania.

== Qualifications ==
- 1969 Bachelor of Arts, University of Sydney

== Recognition ==
- 1955 Awarded the Florence Nightingale Scholarship to study at the Royal College of Nursing, London.
- 1981 Fellowship of the Australian College of Education (FACE), awarded in recognition of Parkes's outstanding contribution to an area of specialised education.
- 1982 Awarded Member of the Order Of Australia (AM) in the Australia Day awards, for service to nursing.
- 1997 Distinguished Life Fellow Award, Royal College of Nursing (Australia).
- 2017 Curtin University 50 Years of Innovations - Recognition of Parkes as one of 14 Curtin University ‘History Makers’.
- 2018 Recognised by the National Council of Women New South Wales (NCW) at its 26th Annual Jean Arnot Memorial Luncheon, for outstanding contribution to the community.

== Consultancies, invitations and sabbaticals ==
- 1956 – 1958 Having received the Florence Nightingale Scholarship to study at the Royal College of Nursing in London, Parkes completed the Sister Tutor Diploma at the University of London in August 1958.
- 1958 Received a Florence Nightingale International Foundation travel grant for a study tour in Scandinavia of curricula content, methods of teaching, and clinical experience in independent schools of nursing.
- 1958 – 1959 Completed a one-year appointment (concluding August 1959) as Surgical Instructor at the Atkinson School of Nursing at Western Hospital, Toronto, Canada.
- 1959 Received a Rockefeller grant for a study tour of selected Schools of Nursing in the USA. Sixteen schools were visited to study content, organisation, and implementation of nursing Degree programs.
- 1980 Consultant, Tasmanian College of Advanced Education for a study to determine the availability of appropriate educational resources in the tertiary sector for the conduct of undergraduate educational programs.
- 1981 Visiting Research Fellow, Nursing Education Research Unit, Chelsea College, University of London.
- 1986 Seconded to the Department of Nursing, Massey University, New Zealand, for four weeks to study nurse education resources.
- 1990 Consultant to the Tasmanian State Institute of Technology to investigate nursing programs in North America, leading to a master's degree by research, and to develop Stage 1 of a proposal for the introduction of a master's degree in Health Science.
- 1990 – 1991 Consultant to Victoria College School of Nursing, Burwood, Victoria. Tasked with developing a proposal for a Bachelor of Nursing Degree, incorporating a competency based model.
- 1992 Consultant to the Royal College of Nursing (Australia) to review administrative structures and to improve services to members.
- 1996 Consultant to the University of Western Sydney (Nepean) Faculty of Nursing and Health Sciences, to review and evaluate course accreditation documents for the Bachelor of Nursing degree program.

== Professional positions ==
- 1954 – 1990 Member of the Australian Nursing Federation.
- 1960 – Fellow of the New South Wales College of Nursing (now the College of Nursing).
- 1961 – Fellow of the Royal College of Nursing Australia.
- 1962 – 1983 Member of the Education Committee, Nurses Registration Board of Western Australia.
- 1964 – 1967 Appointed by Nurse Registration Board of Western Australia to the working committee tasked with revising Western Australia curricula.
- 1970 – Member, Australian Federation of University Women (AFUW).
- 1971 – 1983 Member, Australian College of Education (MACE).
- 1973 – 1990 Councillor, Royal College of Nursing, Australia.
- 1974 – 1976 Member, working party established by the Nurses Board of Western Australia to investigate the future needs of nursing education in Western Australia.
- 1974 – 1976 Member, national working party to develop a statement and strategies for action regarding the introduction of change in relation to nursing education in Australia.
- 1976 – 1978 Undertook a study to consider staffing patterns within Australian hospitals for the provision of nursing care.
- 1976 – 1979 Member, Council of the Royal Australian Nursing Federation, Western Australia Branch.
- 1977 – 1980 State convenor of a task force responsible for advising the National Steering Committee on priorities for implementing the Goals in Nursing Education.
- 1977 – 1988 Appointed to the panel of overseas advisors for the inaugural editorial board for the Journal of Advanced Nursing, published by Blackwell Scientific Publications, UK.
- 1978 – 1984 Advisor, National Steering Committee established to set targets for implementing the Goals in Nursing Education policy statements.
- 1978 – 1988 Member, Censors Board at the Royal College of Nursing, Australia.
- 1980 – 1981 President, Royal College of Nursing, Australia.
- 1981 – 1993 Member of the international editorial board for the international Journal of Nursing Studies, published by Pergamon Press Ltd, UK.
- 1983 – 1991 Member of the editorial board for the Journal of Advanced Nursing published by the Royal Australian Nursing Federation (now Australian Nursing Federation) in Melbourne.
- 1985 – 1988 Member, Editorial Committee of the Australian College of Nursing.
- 1988 – 1992 Member, Nurses’ Board of Tasmania.
- 1989 Member of the Australian Education Council's working party on nurse education, set up to provide advice to ministers, and the National Board of Employment, Education and Training on the appropriate entry level, and duration, of nurse training courses.
- 1989 – 1992 National president, Florence Nightingale Committee of Australia.
- 1991 Ministerial appointment to the Launceston District Health Forum, established to assess consumer input to health service delivery and needs.

== Publications ==
A Professional Pilgrimage: a History of the Florence Nightingale Committee of Australia, 1946-1993

The future of nurse education : professional, academic and vocational perspectives : review and discussion paper

Transitions through time

Goals in nursing

A pathway to career advancement for the enrolled nurse : a continuing education course by distance for enrolled nurses

Learning strategies for enrolled nurses : a pathway to career advancement

Apprenticeship vs. studentship for nurse education : a discussion paper

Research developments in nursing

A study of staffing patterns used in Australian hospitals for the provision of nursing care

Issues in Australian nursing

Blueprint for change: an overview of developments in nursing education in Australia

Issues in Australian nursing 2
