= Alice Tibbits =

Australian nurse (1854–1932)

Alice Tibbits (1854–1932) was a South Australian nursing pioneer who was matron and owner of the Private Hospital, Wakefield Street in the 1880s. She was one of the first to train nurses in Australia and was known as the "Florence Nightingale of South Australia".

== Early life and education ==
Alice Tibbits was born in Walsall, Staffordshire, England in 1854. She and her friend Kate Hill were influenced by Anglican community nurse Sister Dora (Dorothy Wyndlow Pattison) in Staffordshire. The two friends emigrated to South Australia in 1879 and began nursing at the newly opened Adelaide Children's Hospital. Tibbits was the first person to receive a certificate of training from the hospital in 1881. The training included care of sick children, maternity nursing, and secondment to the lying-in wards of the Destitute Asylum. Upon completion of the course, Tibbits went to London at her own expense to complete a further two years as a probationer at the London Hospital and six months training in midwifery at the Endell Street Nursing Home.

Tibbits was a member of the Baptist church.

== Career ==
Tibbits returned to South Australia in 1884 and worked for William Gardner, who requested that she become matron of the Private Hospital, Wakefield Street. She purchased the hospital in 1888 and doubled its bed capacity to 30. In 1902, she acquired two cottages in Ifould Street, as well as a two-storey house on Wakefield Street, which she named "Hatherton" after her home in Staffordshire. She was the first woman in Adelaide to train nurses.

Tibbits was a suffragist. She, along with eight of her trained nurses, was one of the first signers of the South Australian Women's Suffrage Petition which led to the Constitutional Amendment (Adult Suffrage) Act 1894, giving South Australian women the right to vote and to stand for parliament.

In 1902, Hill joined her as a partner and owner of the Wakefield Street Hospital. Tibbits acquired further nearby properties in 1905. Under her leadership, it became the first training hospital for nurses in the colony, and later state, of South Australia. Tibbits herself worked ten-to-twelve hour days. She retired in 1903 and sold the goodwill of the hospital to Hill. In 1905, Tibbits advocated for, and was alongside Hill involved in founding, the South Australian branch of the Australasian Trained Nurses' Association at a meeting chaired by suffragist Rosetta Jane Birks. Tibbits served as a member of the executive for many years.

== Death and legacy ==
Tibbits lived for twenty years in a home called "Hatherton" on 2.75 acres at Mount Lofty, where she died on 2 February 1932 after a long illness.

Tibbits left £1,000 in her will to the Walsall Hospital for a bed in memory of her grandfather. Newspapers at the time said she was known as the "Florence Nightingale of South Australia". In November 1938, a brass commemorative plaque was erected in her memory in the hospital's reception area, after nurses trained by her suggested the need to "perpetuate her memory".
