= Calvary Wakefield Hospital =

Private hospital in South Australia, 1883/84–2020

Calvary Wakefield Hospital (and other names) 1883/84–2020

Geography
- Location: 57 Hutt Street, Adelaide, on the corner of Hutt Street and Wakefield Street, Adelaide, South Australia, Australia
- Coordinates: 34.9276°S 138.6113°E

Organisation
- Care system: Private, not-for-profit
- Type: General

Services
- Emergency department: Yes
- Beds: 50 at opening of building in 1935; 172 at closure in 2020

History
- Founded: 1883 or 1884 (under other names)
- Closed: 2020

Links
- Website: www.calvarycare.org.au/wakefield-private-hospital-adelaide/about/
- Lists: Hospitals in Australia

The Calvary Wakefield Hospital, formerly Private Hospital, Wakefield Street (PHWS) and variants, Wakefield Street Private Hospital, Wakefield Memorial Hospital and Wakefield Hospital, referred to informally as "the Wakefield", was a private hospital founded in 1883 or 1884 on Wakefield Street in Adelaide, South Australia. In 1935, the hospital occupied new, purpose-built premises on the corner of Wakefield and Hutt Streets. In 2006, it was acquired by Little Company of Mary Health Care (trading as Calvary Health Care), a Catholic not-for-profit organisation founded by the Sisters of the Little Company of Mary. In 2020, the hospital was replaced by the newly constructed 344-bed Calvary Adelaide Hospital on Angas Street, the largest private hospital built in South Australia. The hospital provided acute care with inpatient and outpatient facilities, orthopaedic, and neurosurgical services to patients. It specialised in cardiac care, and was the only private 24/7 accident and emergency unit in the city. It employed 600 staff.

== Beginnings ==
The Wakefield was one of the first private hospitals in Adelaide, operating from about 1883 or 1884 after being opened by Mrs Gardner, a widow with three young children. Two doctors, Drs Edward Willis Way and William Gardner (unknown relationship to her husband), employed her at their rooms on North Terrace and at patients' homes, after being impressed by her aptitude for nursing when caring for her ill husband before his death. Dr Gardner asked her to set up a hospital to nurse some of their patients, at a double storey house, formerly owned by the Sunter family, on Wakefield Street. Way, Gardner and Anstey Giles sent patients to the hospital, and the first operation to remove a larynx in South Australia was performed there. The hospital could accommodate 14 patients. Mrs Gardner was matron, and she employed two nurses (including Seely, Greenwood, Mundy and Saltmarsh over the years) and domestic staff. Mrs Gardner became Mrs Duncan when she married Horace Duncan, some time before 1885. There are mentions in contemporary newspapers of "Mrs H. E. Duncan's Private Hospital, Wakefield Street" and Mrs Duncan at "Private Hospital, Wakefield Street" from early 1885, in 1886, and an advertisement about a lost dog refers to H. Duncan at Private Hospital, Wakefield Street in February 1888.

Alice Tibbits (1854–1932), regarded as a pioneer of nursing, took over the hospital in 1888 when Mrs Duncan was forced to retire owing to poor health. Tibbits was born in Walsall, Staffordshire, England, in 1854, and started her nursing career in 1879 at the Adelaide Children's Hospital, where she was the first to receive a certificate of training from the hospital in 1881. After completing her training in London and a further six months' of midwifery at a nursing home in London in 1884, she returned to Adelaide to work at for Dr William Gardner, who requested that she become matron of the PHWS. Tibbits was responsible for doubling the number of beds to 30, after acquiring two cottages in Ifould Street at the rear of the hospital and had another double-storey house built on the eastern side of the hospital in Wakefield Street, which she named "Hatherton", after her home in Staffordshire, a name it retained so long as it was a hospital. The hospital underwent enormous progress under Tibbits, and in November 1938 a brass commemorative plaque was erected by the Wakefield Street Private Hospital Trained Nurses' Association in the hospital reception area in her memory. Under Tibbits, the hospital became the first training hospital for nurses in the colony and (from 1901) state of South Australia. Her tenure as the first matron of the hospital came to an end in 1903. She sold the hospital to her life-long friend Kate Hill who co-founded the South Australia branch of the Australasian Trained Nurses' Association in 1905.

Apart from Drs Gardner, Way and Giles, other doctors associated with the hospital under Tibbits included Joseph Verco and Charles Edward Todd, who was the eldest son of pioneer Charles Todd, and who was President of the South Australian branch of the British Medical Association 1901–1902.

== 20th century ==
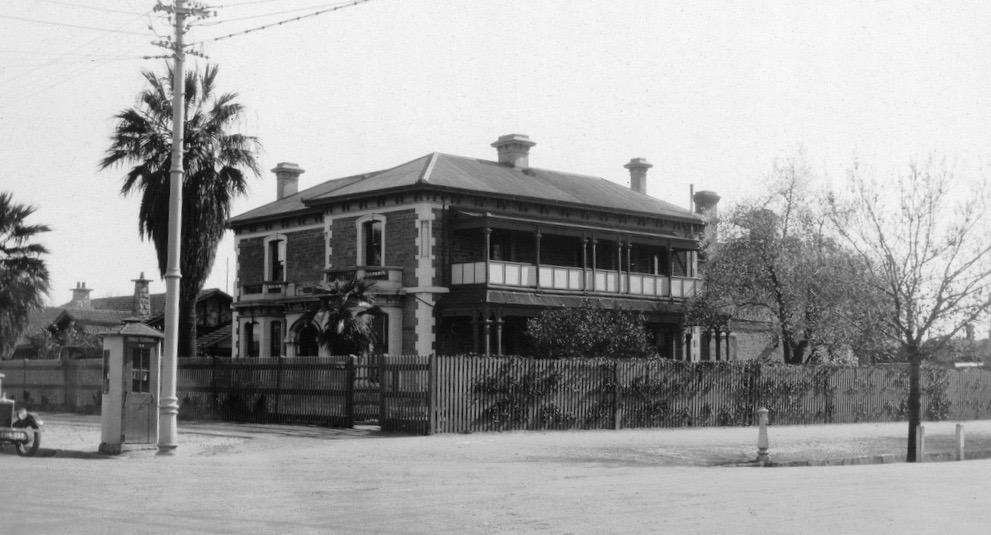
Dr Neische's former home in 1933, shortly before it was demolished to make way for the purpose-built facility

Kate Hill was head nurse at PHWS for around two years from 1889, before returning to her previous employer, the Adelaide Children's Hospital. In 1902 she was taken on as a partner at Wakefield, and after Tibbits' retirement in 1903 acquired the hospital. In 1913, Hill sold the hospital to Sophy Laurence, who had trained under her. At this time, there were five hospital buildings and four cottages for staff. Drs Verco, Todd and others continued at the hospital under Hill.

Laurence bought the goodwill of PHWS from Hill in 1913 and remained matron until 1926. During this time she made many further improvements, including changing from gas lighting to electric lighting. She enlarged the hospital, buying three more cottages as well as the Adelaide College of Music Hall, which (being the quietest place) became the night nurses' sleeping quarters. A former trainee and theatre sister under Laurence, Miss M.R. Rowe, purchased the hospital from her.

In the late 19th and early 20th centuries, the hospital employed private duty nurses and allowed them to stay at the hospital while building their networks.

=== New building (1934) ===
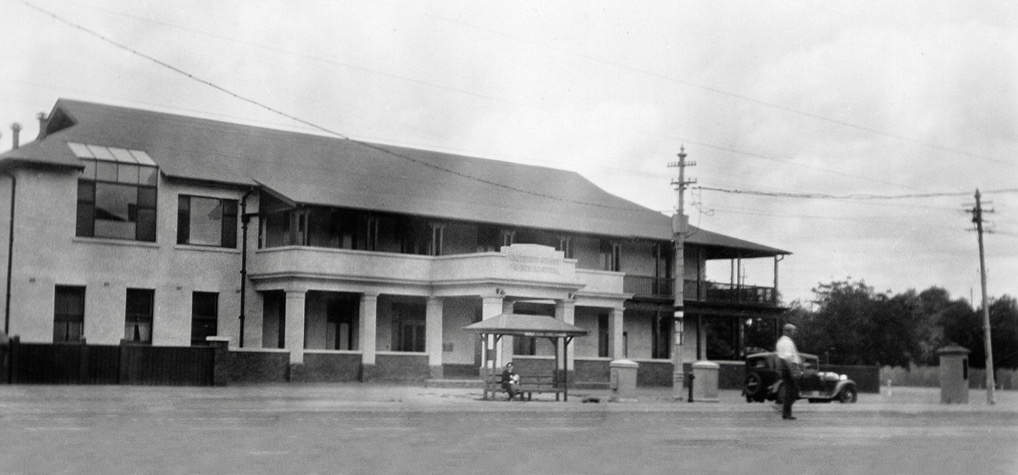
The newly constructed hospital at the corner of Hutt Street and Wakefield Street in 1935

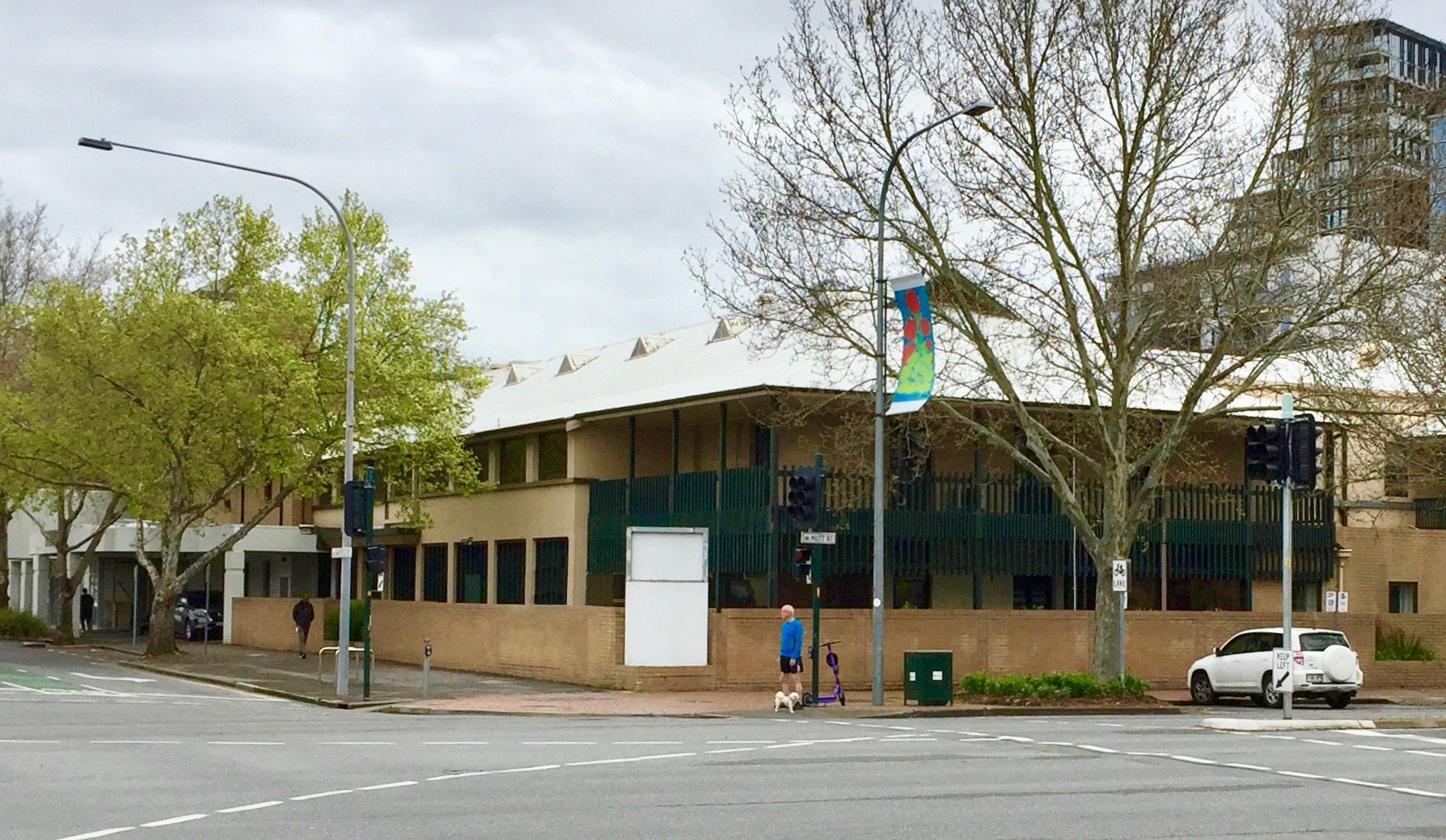
The hospital was greatly expanded and modernised in the 1980s. It closed in 2020 after the Calvary Adelaide Hospital was opened in Angas Street. The original building, shown here in 2022, was demolished in 2023.

Rowe established the company Wakefield Street Private Hospital Ltd, which bought the site at the corner of Wakefield and Hutt Streets, formerly the home of Dr Neische. It was reported in July 1933 that the building, then a guest house and boarding house called Carnarvon Mansions, had been purchased and was going to be demolished to make way for a 50-bed hospital. Designed by Messrs McMichael & Harris (Eric McMichael), it would include an operating theatre, accommodation for staff, central heating, and "all the latest scientific appliances", for which Sister Rowe would be reviewing equipment in hospitals in Sydney and Melbourne. The new hospital, which was completed in June 1934, was opened on 5 July 1934 by Sir David Gordon, president of the Legislative Council of South Australia and chairman of the hospital board. Its cost was £31,000, of which £12,000 was in the form of a loan. The staff comprised 8 sisters, 27 nurses and probationers, and 16 domestic staff, all under Rowe.

Within the first 10 months of its operation, the company had already made a net profit of £1,164. The Private Hospital Wakefield Street Nurses' Association was founded in September 1935, with Miss E. Wark, the first ever probationer at the hospital, appointed as president. The hospital continued to be highly successful, and lucrative for its shareholders.

=== Sale (1949) ===
However, after World War Two at the end of the 1940s, costs rose and despite increased revenue, profits dropped, leading to its being put up for sale. By then described as a 57-bed hospital, the Women's Auxiliary of the Royal Adelaide Hospital, owned by the state government, expressed an interest in purchasing it, but the directors of the hospital recommended to their shareholders instead to accept an offer made by a group of doctors associated with the hospital, as they wanted it to remain in private hands. On 18 August 1949 over 80% of shareholders sold their shares to the 105 doctors involved.

=== 1950s–2000 ===
The hospital was damaged in the 1954 Adelaide earthquake.

The hospital was known as the Wakefield Memorial Hospital from sometime during the 1960s onwards, and was referred to by this name as late as 1993. In 1984 and during election years until 1993, the Wakefield Memorial Hospital was assigned by the Commonwealth Government as a site for registering votes in federal elections.

== 21st century ==
From 2001 until its acquisition in 2006 the hospital, by then with a 172-bed capacity, was owned by Ramsay Health Care and called Wakefield Hospital. The new owners were Little Company of Mary (LCM) Health Care (also known as Calvary Health Care), overseen by the international religious institute Sisters of the Little Company of Mary. After the acquisition, the hospital was renamed Calvary Wakefield Hospital.

The hospital was superseded in 2020 by the 344-bed Calvary Adelaide Hospital, newly built at 120 Angas Street, 700 metres (770 yards) away, which includes a privately operated 24-hour emergency department.

== After closure ==
The complex was acquired by the Pelligra Group for A$30 million in September 2020, "with plans to fit it out as a state of the art health and medical precinct", which would be leased out and might be suitable as an aged care facility. The hospital still included structures dating back to the 1880s.

The closed hospital was contracted for overflow COVID-19 treatment in 2021, but not called for. It was later proposed as a quarantine medi-hotel but did not meet the requirements.

The original building was demolished in 2023.
