= Wakefield Street =

Road in Adelaide, South Australia

Wakefield Street South Australia
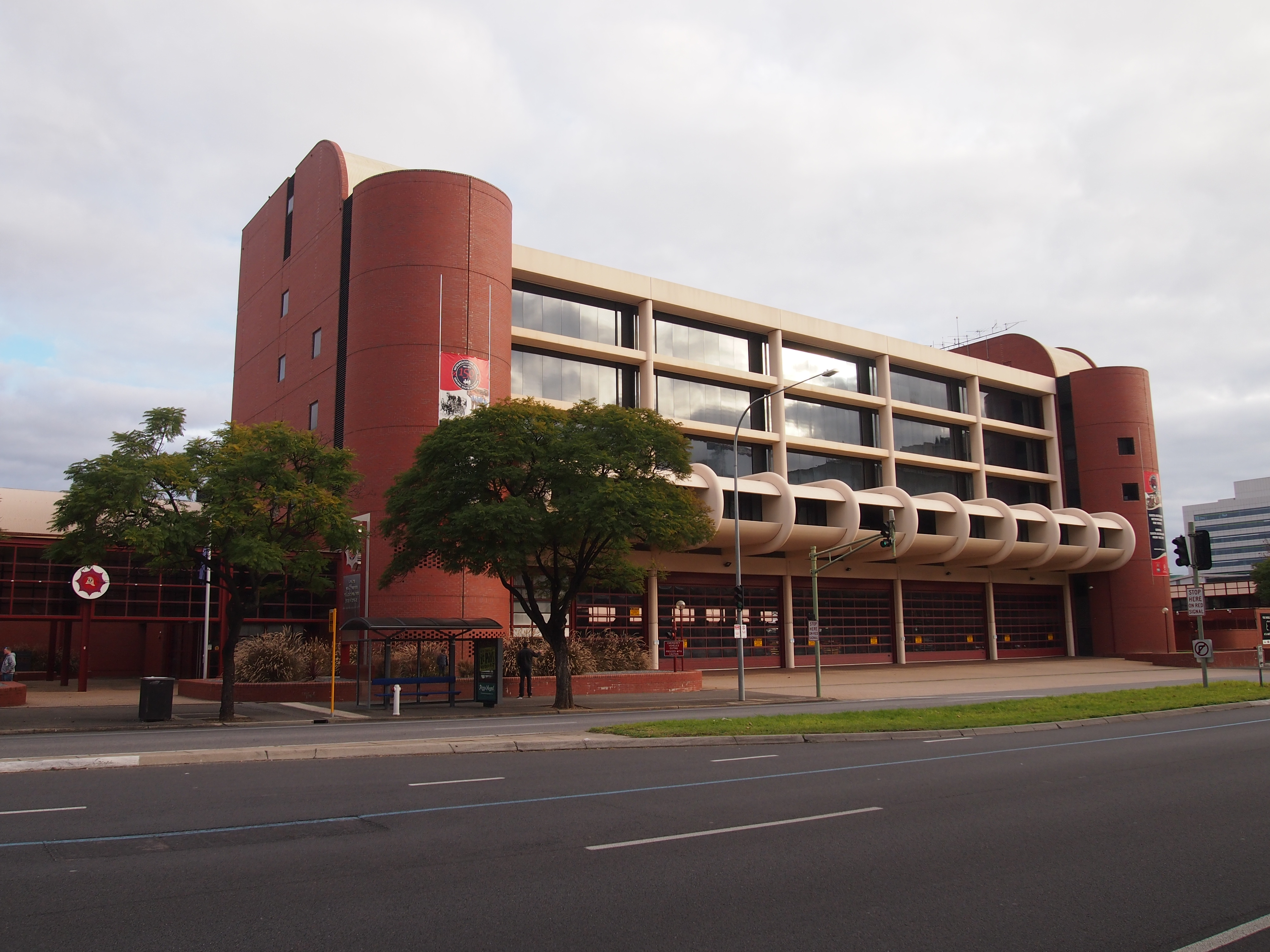
- The Metropolitan Fire Station was built in 1983
- Coordinates: 34.928596°S 138.600720°E (West end); 34.927929°S 138.613777°E (East end)

General information
- Type: Street
- Location: Adelaide city centre
- Length: 1.2 km (0.7 mi)
- Opened: 1837

Major junctions
- West end: Victoria Square; Adelaide
- Pulteney Street; Frome Street; Hutt Street
- East end: East Terrace; Adelaide

Location(s)
- LGA(s): City of Adelaide

Wakefield Street is a main thoroughfare intersecting the centre of the South Australian capital, Adelaide, from east to west at its midpoint. It crosses Victoria Square in the centre of the city, which has a grid street plan. It continues as Wakefield Road on its eastern side, through the eastern Adelaide Park Lands.

== History ==
The street was named after Daniel Bell Wakefield, the solicitor who drafted the Act which proclaimed Adelaide. Like his brother Edward Gibbon Wakefield, he was also involved in the South Australia Association in London, but never visited Adelaide.

In 1911 the Willard Hall and Willard Guest House were opened by the South Australian branch of the WCTU, named after Frances Willard, United States national president of Woman's Christian Temperance Union (WCTU). The building, previously St Andrew's Presbyterian Church, was situated on the south side of the road, 2.75 yards (2.51 m) west of the east side of Gawler Place. In 1928 an old bell was found in the tower, which was probably the first bell cast in Adelaide and made for the church. A 1939 photograph shows the new art deco additions to the building, and the premises of Frank J. Siebert, Funeral Director, on the left.

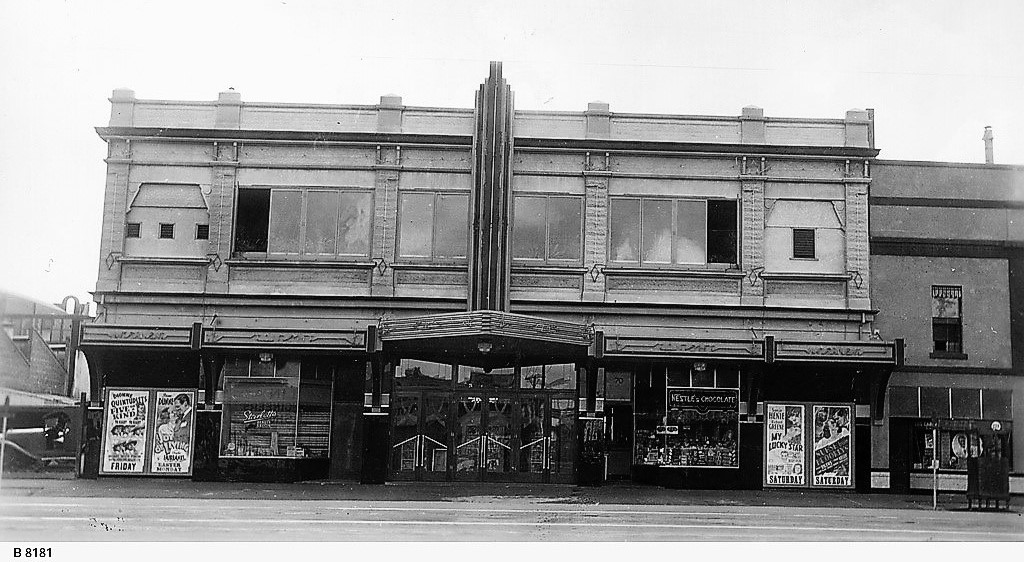
The Star Theatre in Wakefield Street, Adelaide, c.1939

The Central Picture Theatre, designed by R. R. G. (Rowland) Assheton (who also designed the Grand Picture Theatre in Rundle Street, among others) opened at no. 70 in 1912, featuring silent films until its first talkie screened in 1930. On Saturday 14 May 1938, after a change of ownership and complete refurbishment, the cinema was opened as the Star, as part of the Clifford Theatres Circuit (and variously referred to as the New Star Theatre, Wakefield Street; Wakefield Street New Star; and the Wakefield Street Star Theatre.). One reviewer described it as "the most modern theatre in S.A.". Architect Chris Smith had designed the new interior, and furnishings were supplied by John Martin's The refit was in Art Deco style. The Star closed around 1959 or 1960 and reopened in 1962/63 as a Greek theatre, the Pantheon. It was demolished (date unknown) and is now the site of a carpark next to an office block tenanted by SAPOL. The building was constructed around 1980, with its address no. 60.

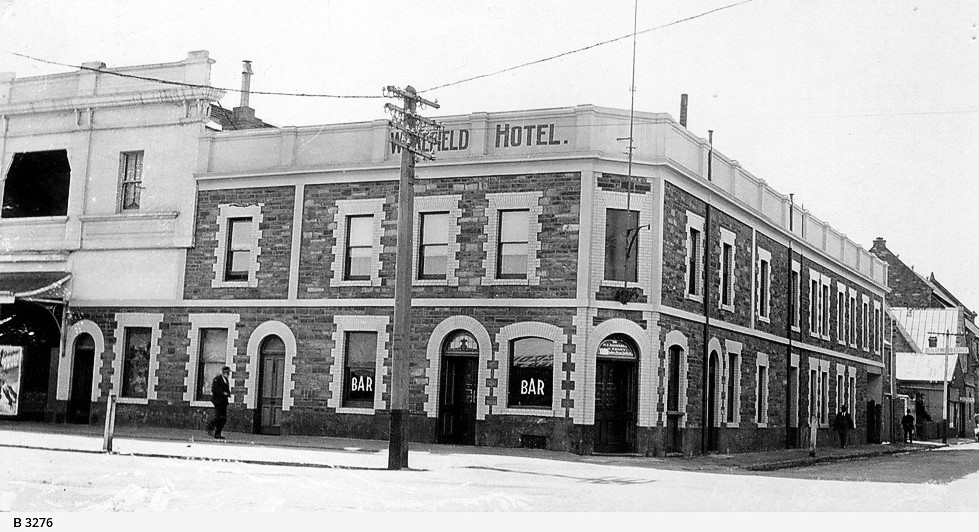
Wakefield Hotel, Adelaide, c.1926

The cinema was situated adjacent to the Wakefield Hotel on its western side. The hotel had existed on this site, on the corner of Divett Place, since 1864, and the stone building stands at no. 76. In 1927 its licensees were M.G. Henderson and V. Kenny. It is a stone building with cream brick decoration.

The first training hospital for nurses in the colony and then state, Private Hospital, Wakefield Street, occupied various sites between Daly and Hutt Street from 1883 to 1884 until January 2020, when the new Calvary Adelaide Hospital opened on Angas Street.

The Unitarian Christian Church which once stood opposite Francis Xavier's Cathedral was sold to the Public Service Association in 1971. It was replaced with a government building known as the "Wakefield House", a 20-storey building in brutalist style completed in 1980.

St Stephen's (or Stephani) Evangelical Lutheran church was also on the north side, between Roper and Ackland streets. The church was founded by Rev. Dr Ernst Johann Eitel in 1900 to replace a smaller building in Pirie Street. He was succeeded in 1906 by F. W. Basedow.

== Location and description ==
It runs in from east to west between East Terrace and Victoria Square, and is one of the three streets (along with Grote Street and King William Street) to run through Victoria Square in the middle of the Adelaide city centre. The same three streets are also the widest streets in the city centre, at 2 chains (130 ft; 40 m) wide (refer to Adelaide city centre#Layout). The western end of Wakefield Street is continued across Victoria Square as Grote Street, which extends to West Terrace. The eastern end of Wakefield Street continues as Wakefield Road across the Adelaide Park Lands to Britannia Roundabout on the City Ring Route, Adelaide. Wakefield Road continues on the eastern side of the roundabout as Kensington Road.

== Notable buildings ==
Buildings on Wakefield Street include (more or less west to east):

- St Francis Xavier's Cathedral, Adelaide
- Adelaide Holocaust Museum and Andrew Steiner Education Centre in the heritage-listed Fennescey House
- St Aloysius College, Adelaide
- SA Police city branch
- Wakefield Hotel (no. 76)
- The South Australian Metropolitan Fire Service
- Our Boys' Institute building, now a boutique hotel
- Christian Brothers College, Adelaide
- Former Calvary Wakefield Hospital

== Junction list ==
Location	km	mi	Destinations	Notes
Adelaide city centre	0	0.0	Victoria Square, King William Street	Continues as Grote Street
Adelaide city centre	0.2	0.12	Gawler Place	
Adelaide city centre	0.55	0.34	Pulteney Street	
Adelaide city centre	0.75	0.47	Frome Street	
Adelaide city centre	1.1	0.68	Hutt Street	
Adelaide city centre	1.2	0.75	East Terrace	
1.000 mi = 1.609 km; 1.000 km = 0.621 mi
