= Hutt Street =

Street in Adelaide, South Australia

Hutt Street South Australia
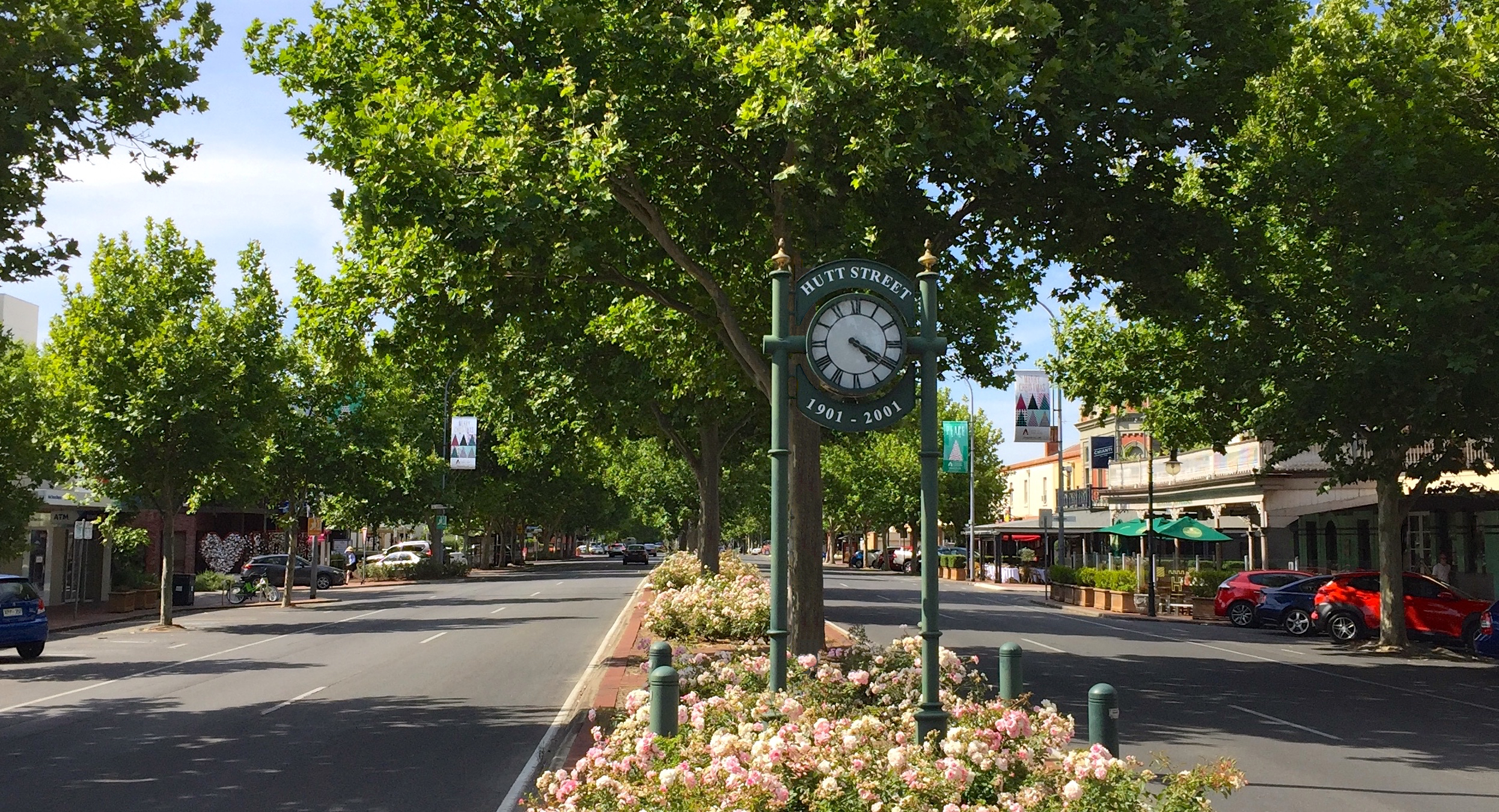
- Hutt Street, Adelaide, looking north. The London plane trees and median strip rose beds are prominent features of the street throughout its length
- Coordinates: 34.925133°S 138.611813°E (North end); 34.935055°S 138.612532°E (South end)

General information
- Type: Street
- Location: Adelaide city centre
- Length: 1.1 km (0.7 mi)
- Opened: 1837

Major junctions
- North end: East Terrace; Adelaide
- Pirie Street; Wakefield Street; Halifax Street; South Terrace
- South end: Hutt Road; Adelaide

Location(s)
- LGA(s): City of Adelaide

Hutt Street is the easternmost of the five major north–south roads running through the City of Adelaide, Australia. It runs from Pirie Street to South Terrace, from where it continues south as Hutt Road. Flanked by leafy side streets with many late 19th-century dwellings, it is home to a wide range of restaurants, two pubs, shops, offices and professional and medical suites.

== History ==
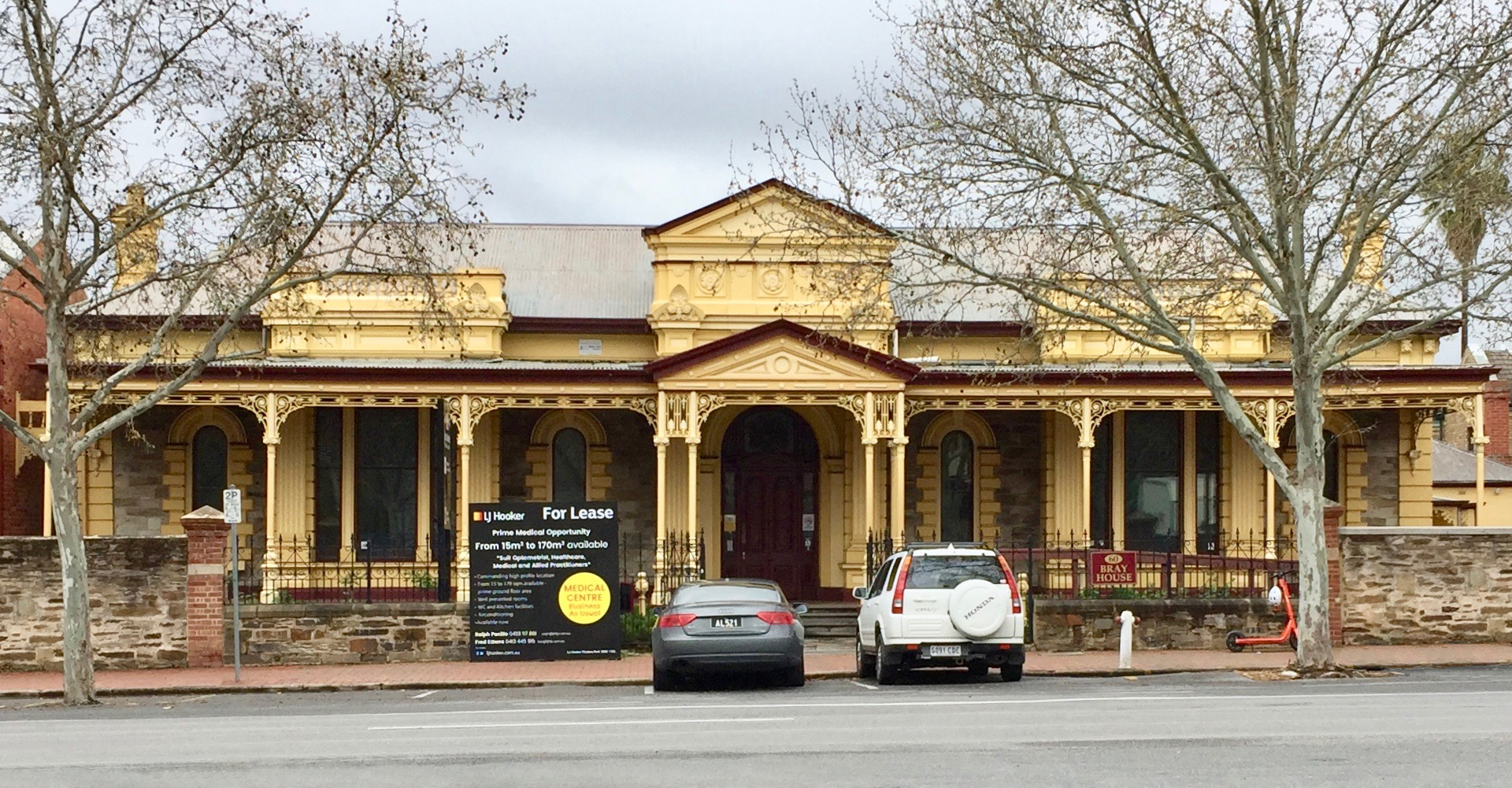
Bray House

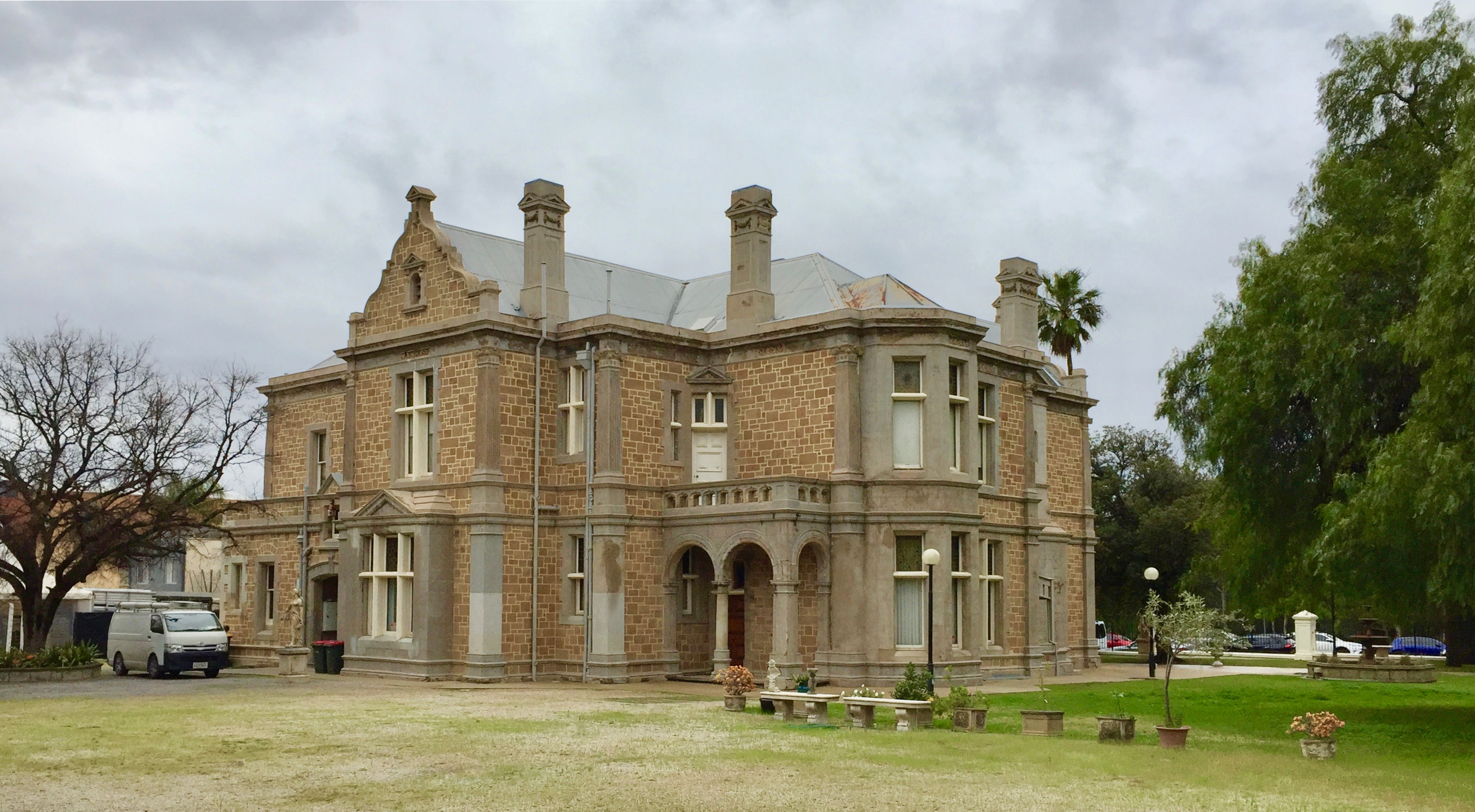
Rymill House

Hutt Street is one of the original streets laid out in William Light's 1835 Adelaide city plan of 1835. It was named after Sir William Hutt, a British MP who was heavily involved in colonial South Australia, being one of the original Colonisation Commissioners.

== Features ==
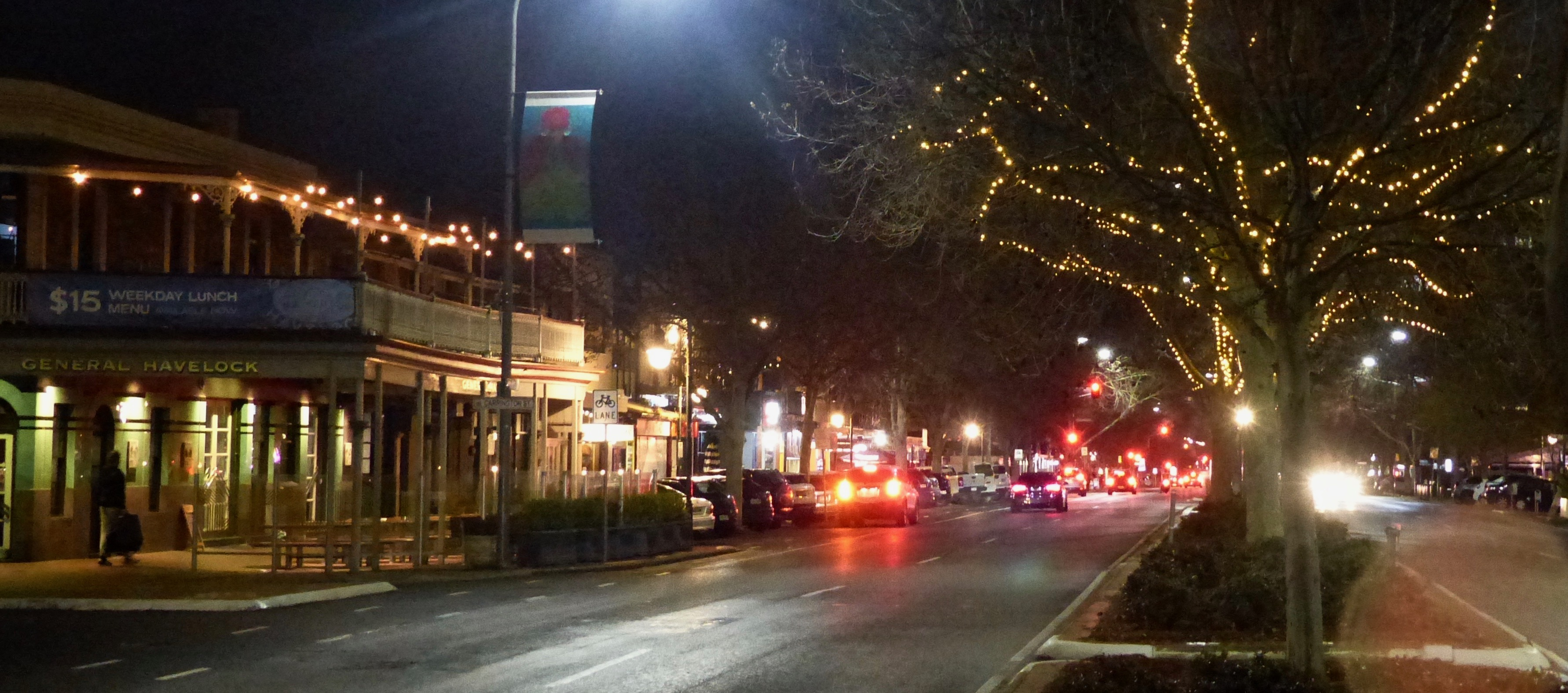
Hutt street restaurants at night

Located within the Adelaide city centre, Hutt street is occupied by numerous heritage buildings of architectural significance with many dating to the nineteenth century. Hutt Street has many restaurants and small businesses, including professional premises. It is known within Adelaide as a boutique dining locality. Pubs include the Arab Steed and Havelock Hotel, and there are many popular restaurants.

Hutt Street's surrounding streets and lanes include large wealthy homes intermixed with small workers' cottages, reflecting the substantial social mixture of early South Australia.

The Hutt Street Centre is a charity that provides services to homeless people, such as showers, meals and phone access on the premises, and outreach services such as medical, financial, housing, and employment services.

Each December, the Motorcycle Riders Association of SA holds a community event called the Toy Run, which raises funds for charity and which starts in Wakefield Street and then proceeds southwards along Hutt Street before heading up the South Eastern Freeway and finishing at Callington.

The Adelaide Street Circuit centred on nearby Victoria Park, traverses 140 metres (460 ft) of Hutt Street between Flinders Street and Bartels Road. A partial road closure occurs during the Adelaide 500.

A private hospital was a significant landmark at the north-west corner of the Hutt and Wakefield Streets intersection. It was constructed there in 1934 as a special-purpose building with a capacity of 50 beds, to which the original "Private Hospital, Wakefield Street", founded about 1883–84, moved its activities. It was variously known also as Wakefield Memorial Hospital and Wakefield Hospital, or informally as "the Wakefield". The building was substantially expanded to a capacity of 180 beds and modernised before being acquired in 2006 by the Calvary group and renaming as Calvary Wakefield Hospital. It was superseded in 2020 by a new 344-bed hospital, Calvary Adelaide Hospital, 700 metres (770 yards) away in Angas Street.

== Historic buildings ==
=== Bray House ===
Bray House, at no. 60 Hutt Street, is one of the elegant buildings along Hutt Street that were erected in the late 19th century. It was significantly extended from a reportedly five-room brick cottage in the 1850s by Neville Blyth, one of two brothers who became notable politicians. In 1880, John Cox Bray, a legal practitioner who became Premier of South Australia, bought it and had the two-room-deep frontage of the building, as it appears today, constructed. The National Trust of South Australia has described the addition as "typical of the period, as Adelaide's economy was booming at the time. The flamboyant use of stucco and extensive cast-iron work is also symbolic of the status of the owner". The house remained in the Bray family until it was acquired by the Adelaide City Council in 1973. After restoration it housed offices.

=== Rymill House ===
Rymill House and Coach House, at no. 40 Hutt Street on the corner with Flinders Street, is on a large block that extends to East Terrace. It had its beginnings in the plot of land purchased by brothers Henry and Frank Rymill, who were financiers, in 1859. They first had a small cottage built on the land, designed by George Strickland Kingston, which was completed in 1860. After some years, Henry bought out Frank's share and had the cottage demolished. The present building was constructed in 1881 or 1884 to the design of John Haslam. It was called "The Firs", although the surrounding trees were actually Aleppo pines. It was described as being in the Queen Anne architectural style, built using brown stone and Sydney stone. The house's heritage statement includes: "it is one of the largest and most prominent 19th century park lands mansions for which Adelaide has been renowned".

Henry Rymill, then his descendants, lived in the house until World War II. It was sold in 1950 to the Postmaster-General's Department and used for training until closed in 1982 by successor Australia Post. It fell into neglect before being restored. In 1998, the Constantine family bought the property and had the house restored, and since 2012 custodianship has been shared with the Rymill House Foundation Trust. Since 2000, fundraising events have been held in the grounds to support education, heritage, sporting and welfare organisations in South Australia. In early 2022, plans to construct a new function centre, which would be placed in front of the house, were submitted for approval.
