= Victoria Square, Adelaide =

Public square in the centre of Adelaide, South Australia

Victoria Square
- Tarntanyangga
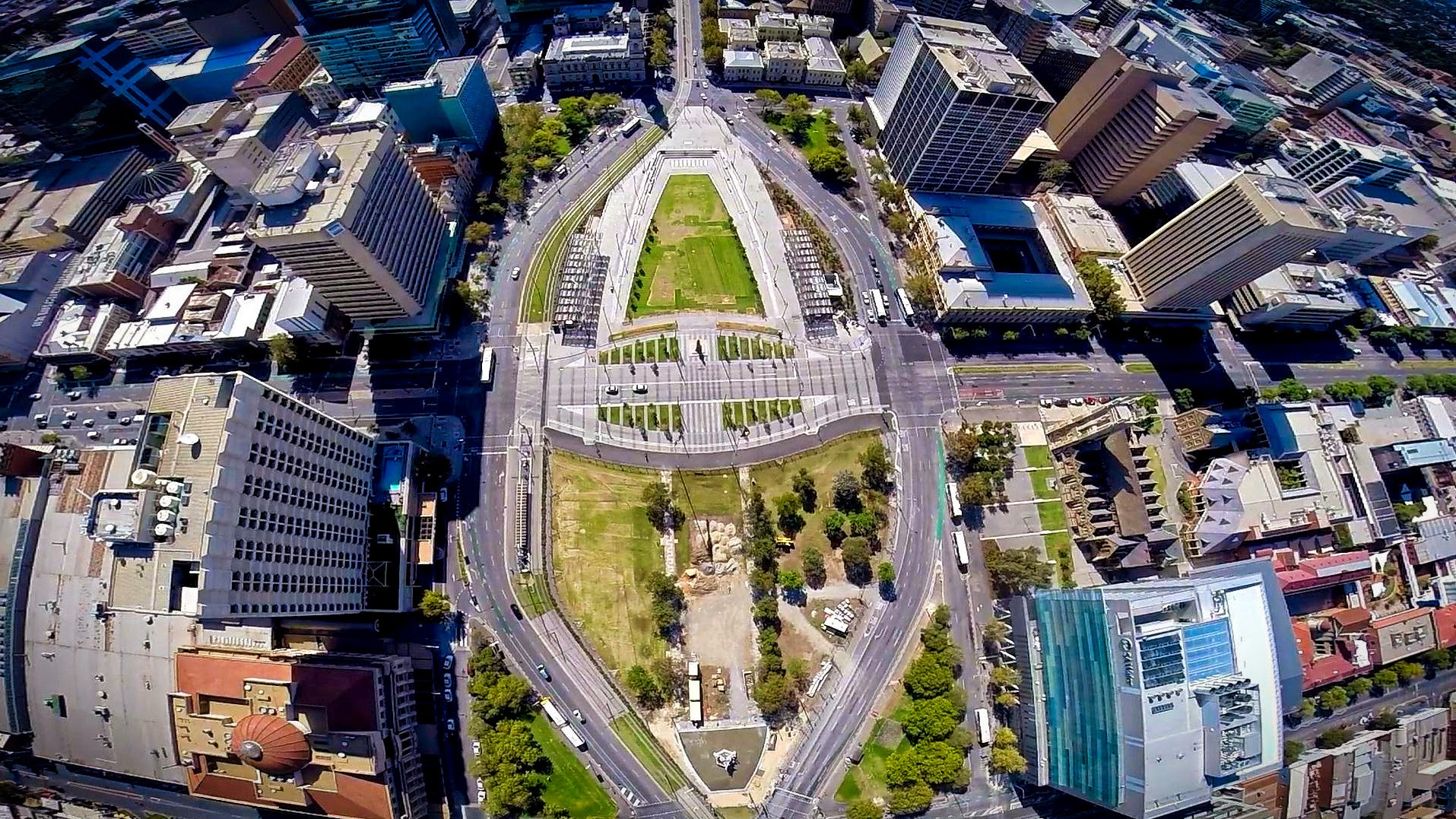
- Aerial view of Victoria Square

- Location within City of Adelaide
- Type: Square
- Location: Adelaide, South Australia, Australia
- Coordinates: 34°55′41″S 138°36′00″E
- Area: 2.4 hectares (5.9 acres)
- Created: 1837

Victoria Square / Tarntanyangga (Kaurna pronunciation: [ˈd̪̥aɳɖaɲaŋɡa]), is the central square of five public squares in the Adelaide city centre, South Australia.

It is one of six squares designed by the founder of Adelaide, Colonel William Light, who was Surveyor-General at the time, in his 1837 plan of the City of Adelaide which spanned the River Torrens Valley, comprising the city centre (South Adelaide) and North Adelaide. The square was named on 23 May 1837 by the Street Naming Committee after Princess Victoria, then heir presumptive of the British throne. In 2002, it was assigned a second name, Tarndanyangga (later amended to Tarntanyangga), in the Kaurna language of the original inhabitants, as part of the Adelaide City Council's dual naming initiative.

The square has been upgraded and modified several times through its lifetime. It has become a tradition that during the Christmas period a 24.5-metre (80 ft) tall Christmas tree is erected in the northern part of the square.

== Dual naming and significance ==
The square was first named "Victoria Square" on 23 May 1837 by the Street Naming Committee, in honour of the then Princess Victoria.

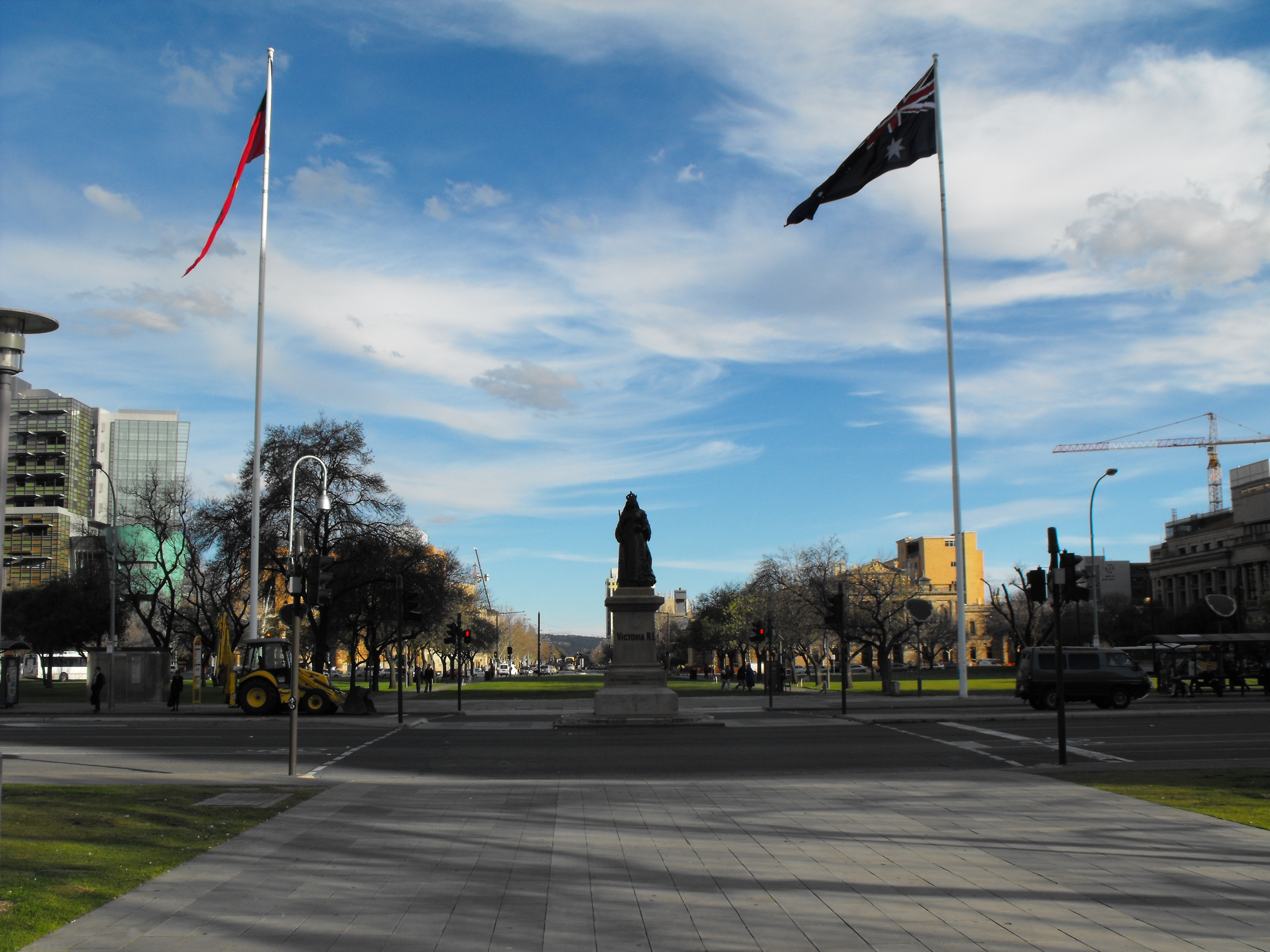
The Australian National Flag and the Australian Aboriginal flag in Victoria Square, with the statue of Queen Victoria in the background (2008)

In line with the Adelaide City Council's recognition of Kaurna country, the square was officially referred to as "Victoria Square / Tarndanyangga" from 2002, modified to "Victoria Square /Tarntanyangga" by 2013, when Stage 1 of a major upgrade was done. This remains the official name.

The name "Tarndanya", sometimes recorded as "Dharnda anya" (or variant spelling) by colonial sources, means "red kangaroo rock" and was reportedly the name used by the Kaurna people for "the site of South Adelaide" or the central-South Adelaide area; the local people whose central camp had been "in or near Victoria Square" were called the "Dundagunya tribe" by colonial sources. Tarndanyangga/Tarntanyangga is derived from the Kaurna word for "red kangaroo" – tarnta (tarnda) – and that for "rock" – kanya. The ending "-ngga" means it is a location, implying "in, at or on", which is often used in Kaurna place names. Many quarries were built on the southern bank of the Torrens, and Tarnta Kanya probably referred to one or more rock formations which were quarried, providing much of the stone for the large early buildings on North Terrace.

Victoria Square / Tarndanyangga is still considered an important meeting place for Aboriginal Australians. It is the focus for many political and community-based Indigenous events, such as the National Sorry Day commemoration held by Journey of Healing (SA) on 26 May each year. Each year during NAIDOC Week in July, there is a "family fun day" held at the square and a march to Parliament House.

The Australian Aboriginal flag was flown at Victoria Square for the first time in the country at a land rights rally in Victoria Square in Adelaide on 9 July 1971. On 8 July 2002 the Adelaide City Council endorsed the permanent flying of the flag, which now flies adjacent to the Australian flag.

== Description ==
Victoria Square is in the centre of the city's grid plan, designed by William Light. It is bordered by numerous public institutions at its north and south ends, including the Supreme Court of South Australia, the Adelaide Magistrates' Court, the Federal Court of Australia, the historic old Treasury building (now a hotel run by the Adina hotel chain) and the former Adelaide General Post Office.

On the eastern side is the Roman Catholic Cathedral Church of St Francis Xavier, the SA Water headquarters, State Government offices, including the office of the Premier, and the Torrens Building.

The west side of the square contains more commercially oriented buildings, including an entrance to the Adelaide Central Market, the Hilton hotel, and the offices of various consultants, law firms and insurance companies.

King William Street passes through the centre of the square from north to south, creating a diamond shape, with the southbound carriageway passing through the east side, and the northbound carriageway passing through the west side of the square. The square is bisected on its east–west axis by the section of road (technically part of the square) that connects Wakefield Street (entering from the east) with Grote Street (to the west).

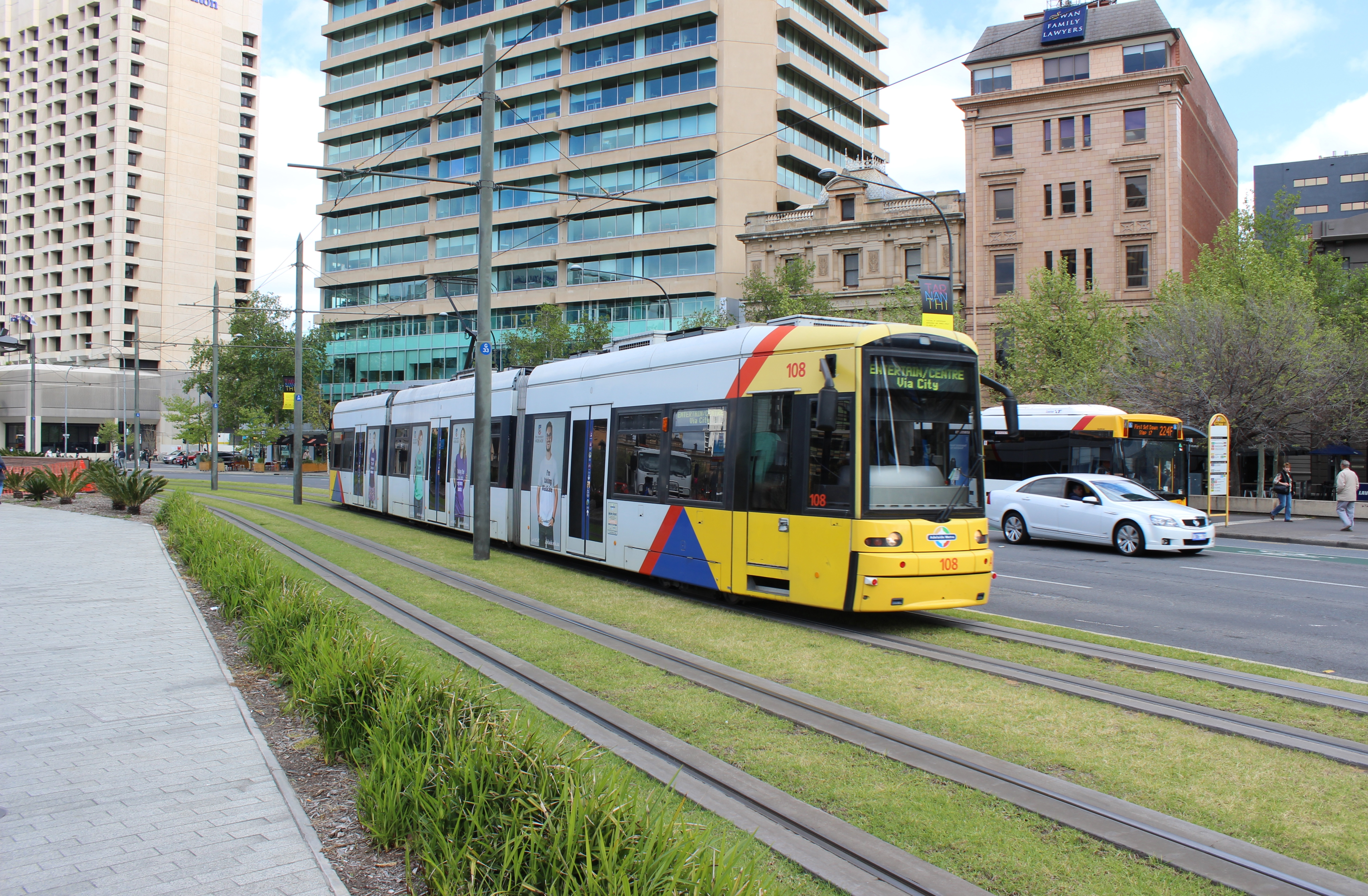
A tram running on green track at Victoria Square

A tram stop (formerly the terminus) for the Glenelg tram line is just south of the Queen Victoria statue; it was shifted from the centre to the western edge of the square in 2007, as part of the extension that was made to the tram line around that time.

== History ==
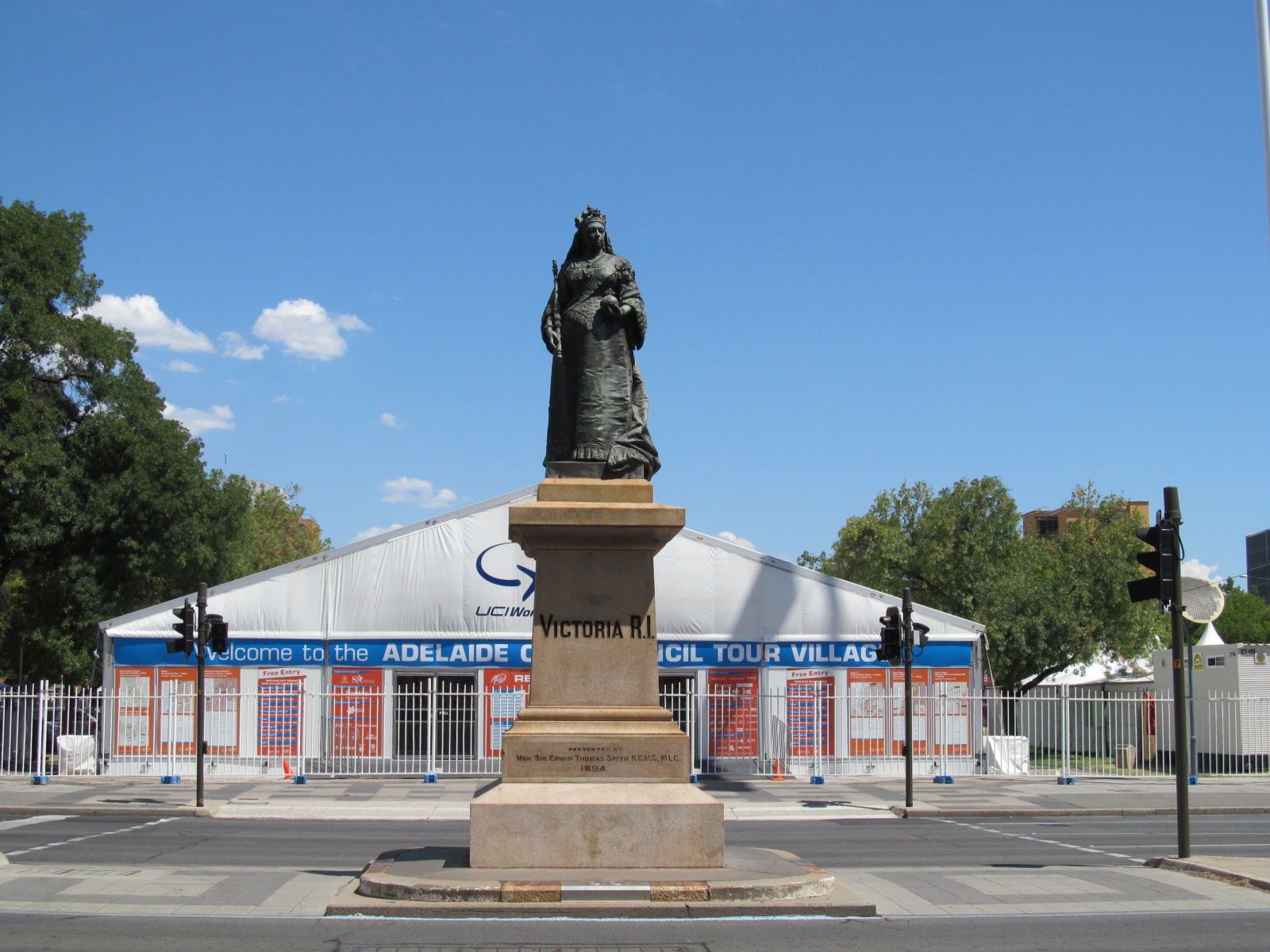
Statue of Queen Victoria, initially erected in 1894

The link between the Aboriginal people and the square, as a centre for the surrounding area, stretches back many centuries, to a time when Tarndanya (Red Kangaroo Dreaming) people gathered there for special ceremonies and dances. Tarndanyangga was the "headquarters" or central camp of the "Dundagunya tribe", a community numbering in the thousands. During the 1960s the Aboriginal community renewed its activities in Victoria Square, with the area in front of what was then the central Police Station (and is now the Commonwealth Law Courts building), becoming a social and gathering point.

=== 19th century ===
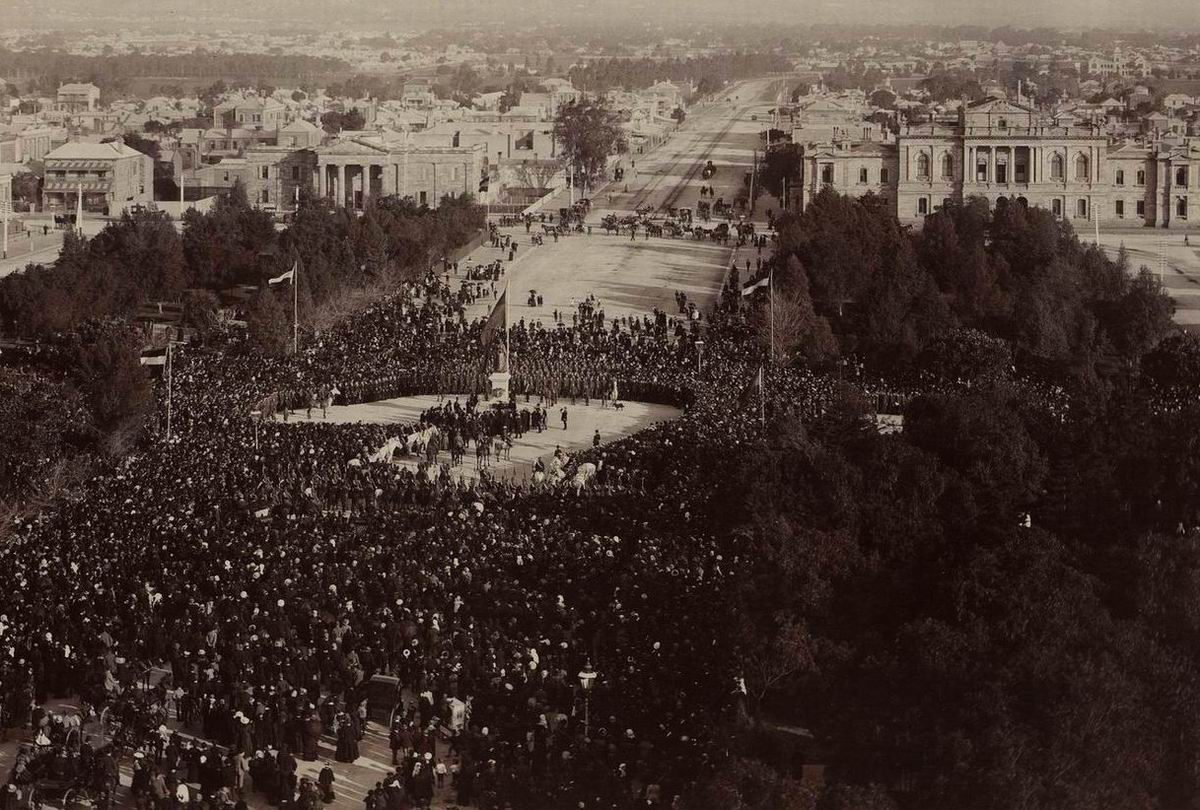
Ceremony to mark the unveiling of the statue of Queen Victoria in Victoria Square on 11 August 1894

In 1837, the first Surveyor General of South Australia, Colonel William Light, mapped a plan for the City of Adelaide. The design incorporated a central square to function as Adelaide's focal point and provide open space for recreational activities. On his first map, Light called the precinct "The Great Square". It was eventually named in honour of Princess Victoria, then heir to the British throne.

The square was a dusty, treeless paddock until 1854, when the Adelaide City Council embarked on a planting program, constructed four broad diagonal pedestrian paths and erected a wooden fence. The landscaping work was designed by George William Francis, later the first director of the Adelaide Botanic Garden.

Other work on the square included construction of an east–west roadway that created two garden areas. A fountain was also considered, but it took a further 100 years for this idea to come to fruition. By 1883, plans were under way to extend King William Street directly through Victoria Square, dividing it into four garden areas. The original wooden fence was replaced by ornate iron railings. A statue of Queen Victoria – who had ascended to the throne in June 1837 – was erected in the centre of the square in 1894.

=== 20th century ===
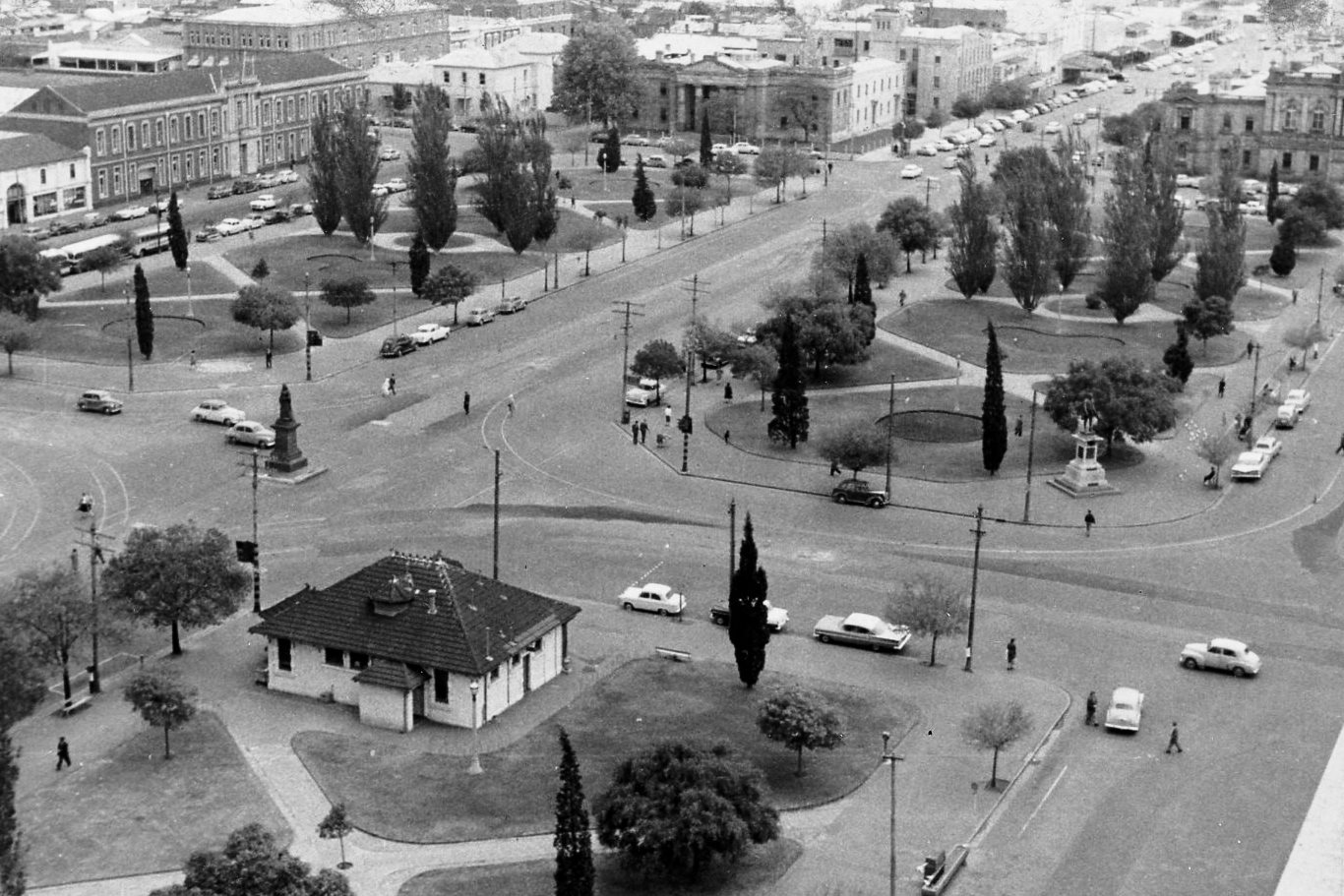
Victoria Square, 1960

The statue of Colonel Light, now known as Light's Vision and since 1938 situated on Montefiore Hill, was unveiled on 27 November 1906 in its original location at the northern end of Victoria Square.

The original tram terminus was located outside the Charles Moore & Company department store with services operating via a loop in an anti-clockwise direction in the south-western corner. As part of the rebuilding of the square, in December 1966 the tram terminus was relocated near the centre of the square with Grote and Wakefield Streets to the north and Gouger and Angas Streets to the south.

The layout remained unchanged until 1967 when the square assumed its present diamond form. The Three Rivers Fountain by John Dowie was built to commemorate the visit of Queen Elizabeth II and Prince Philip, in 1968. The three South Australian rivers, the Murray, Onkaparinga and Torrens, are represented by an Aboriginal male with an Ibis, a female with a heron, and a female with a black swan. On 12 July 1971, the red, black and yellow Aboriginal flag designed by Harold Thomas was flown for the first time – in Victoria Square. It now flies permanently alongside the Australian flag on one of the two tall flagpoles in the centre of the square.

=== 21st century ===
In 2002, the Adelaide City Council formally recognised the areas heritage by bestowing the dual name Victoria Square/Tarndanyangga. The old tram depot at the square was also demolished, so was the old SAPOL Headquarters. An SA Water office building was built in its place. In 2012 the Adelaide City Council endorsed $24 million in funding to begin rejuvenating Victoria Square. Construction commenced in March 2013 and the first of two planned stages (the northern half) was completed in February 2014. The planned redevelopment of the southern half has been held up due to lack of funding. The full development included:

- A relocation of the statue of Queen Victoria slightly to the north
- Future 'Fire' themed artwork
- Relocated tram line
- Perimeter streets
- Information Experience Centre
- Water feature
- Mullabakka Centre (Kaurna Centre of Culture)
- Cafe
- Productive gardens
- Perimeter gardens
- Event Lawn to accommodate medium to large events of
  up to 9,000 people, with terraces and service area
- Extended tram stop
- Bicycle Hub
- Public toilets
- Bio-filtration & Wetland gardens
- Garden terraces
- Arcadian Grove relocated
- Arbours
- Perimeter footpaths
- Three Rivers Fountain relocated to the south

== Features ==
=== Statue of Queen Victoria ===
Located in the centre of the square is a statue honouring Queen Victoria from a model by C. B. Birch, unveiled in 1894. The statue was presented to the city by Sir Edwin Smith, based on a design viewed in England in 1893. It was cast by Moore & Co. of Thames Ditton using bronze specifically made from Wallaroo and Moonta copper. Inscribed simply with "Victoria R.I.", the statue was originally unveiled by Lady Smith on 11 August 1894. The statue was symbolically draped in black as a sign of mourning following the death of Queen Victoria in 1901. For many years a wreath laying ceremony was held at the foot of the statue each 24 May (or 23rd when the 24th was a Saturday), the anniversary of her birth in 1819. It was removed, cleaned and polished in May 2013 as part of the upgrade of Victoria Square and returned in December 2013 in a modified location.

=== Three Rivers Fountain ===
The Three Rivers Fountain was erected to commemorate the visit of Queen Elizabeth II to Adelaide in February 1963. Located at the northern end of the square, it was unveiled and first set in operation by the Duke of Edinburgh on 28 May 1968. It was later relocated to the southern end, and was officially reopened by then Lord Mayor, Stephen Yarwood, in July 2014.

Sculptured by John Dowie, the centrepiece in the shape of a crown represents the royal visit, and the fountain represents the three rivers that Adelaide draws water from:

- The Murray, depicted by an Aboriginal man and an ibis (probably representing Kaurna ancestor creator Tjilbruke)
- The Torrens, depicted by a woman and a black swan
- The Onkaparinga, depicted by a woman and a heron

The fountain was heritage-listed as a state heritage place in 2012.

=== The State Survey Mark ===
Located at the northern end of the square, the State Survey Mark commemorates the placing of the first peg for the survey of the City of Adelaide by Colonel Light on 11 January 1837. This survey mark is the reference point for all other survey marks in South Australia. The mark was unveiled on 21 April 1989, along with a commemorative plaque, by Susan Lenehan, then Minister of Lands.

=== Reconciliation Plaza ===
The east–west road connecting Grote and Wakefield Streets was named Reconciliation Plaza in 2013. The plaza hosts two flagpoles flying the Australian National Flag and the Aboriginal flag, which has flown permanently in the square since 2002. In 1971, the square was the first place the Aboriginal flag was flown, at a land rights rally (see Dual naming, above).

Reconciliation Plaza was officially opened on 26 May 2014 by Mayor Yarwood, Reconciliation Committee Chairperson Yvonne Agius and Journey of Healing SA Chairperson John Browne.

=== Statue of John McDouall Stuart ===
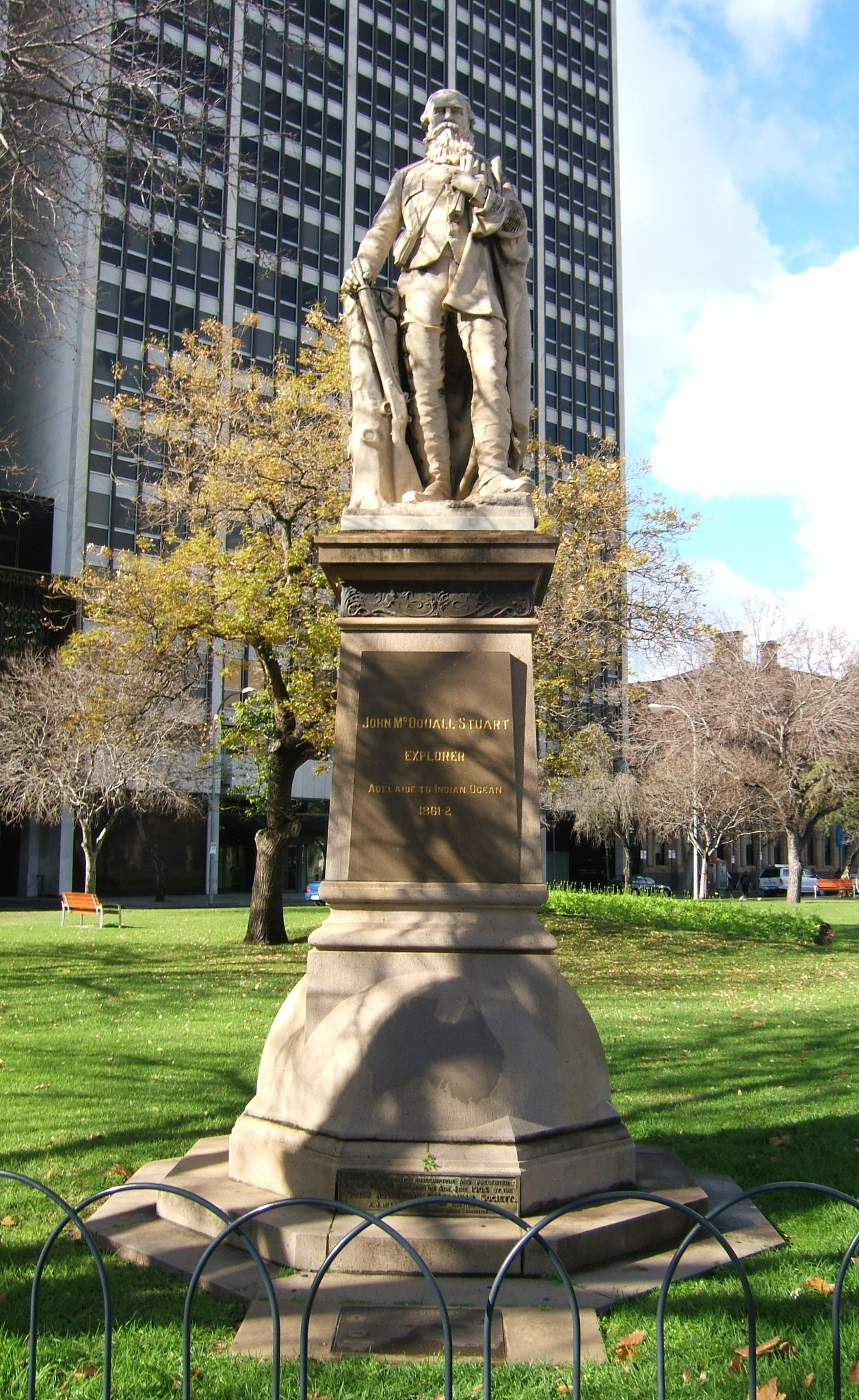
John McDouall Stuart monument

A monument to John McDouall Stuart, one of Australia's premier explorers, is situated in Victoria Square and was heritage listed on 8 March 2013. Sculpted by John White, it was unveiled on 4 June 1904 by Alexander McLachlan, who as chief of the South Australian Caledonian Society led fundraising efforts for its erection. Stuart led the first expedition to successfully cross the continent from north to south and back. This opened Central Australia for pastoral use and led to the South Australian government's successful case for control over the Northern Territory. The route of his expedition also paved the way for the Overland Telegraph, which permitted virtually immediate communication between Australia and Europe.

=== Statue of Charles Sturt ===
A statue of explorer Charles Sturt stands in Victoria Square. Sturt is depicted in the working clothes of an outback explorer, leaning forward, shielding his eyes from the sun with his right hand and peering into the distance. He carries a compass, telescope, map and water bottle.

=== Statue of Charles Kingston ===
A statue of Charles Kingston, son of George Strickland Kingston and SA premier from 1893 to 1899, stands in the square with a plaque reading "patriot and statesman". British sculptor Alfred Drury was commissioned to create the statue, and it was placed in a central location on the northwestern side, facing down Grote Street towards his West Adelaide electorate. It was unveiled on 26 May 1916, during World War I. It was later criticised as capturing "little of his fire". While Kingston was instrumental in bringing about several progressive social policies, such as electoral reform (including the first law to give votes to women in Australia), a legitimation Act, the first conciliation and arbitration act in Australia, and a progressive system of taxation, he was also one of the main architects of the White Australia policy. After the Black Lives Matter gained pace in June 2020, with various statues representing slave traders and various perpetrators of racism being removed or defaced both in the US and in the UK during the George Floyd protests, archaeologist and historian Jacinta Koolmatrie argued it is ironic that the statue is placed so close to the Aboriginal flag in the square, which was also the site of the Adelaide Black Lives Matter protest.

== Tram stop ==
Victoria Square is also the location of a stop on the Glenelg tram line.

Preceding station	Adelaide Metro	Following station
Pirie Street towards Royal Adelaide Hospital, Adelaide Entertainment Centre or Festival Plaza	Glenelg tram line	City South towards Moseley Square

== Gallery ==
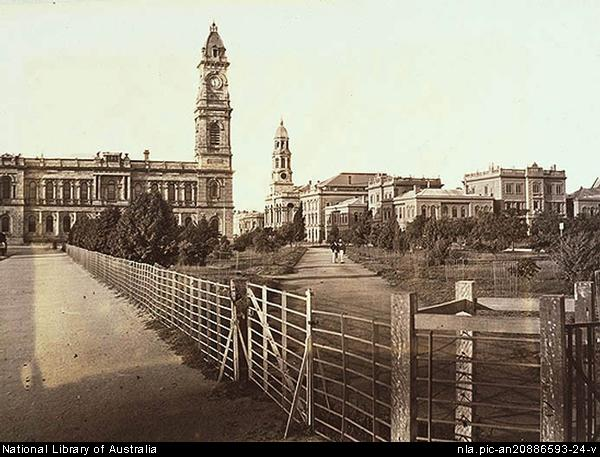
Victoria Square, looking north, 1869

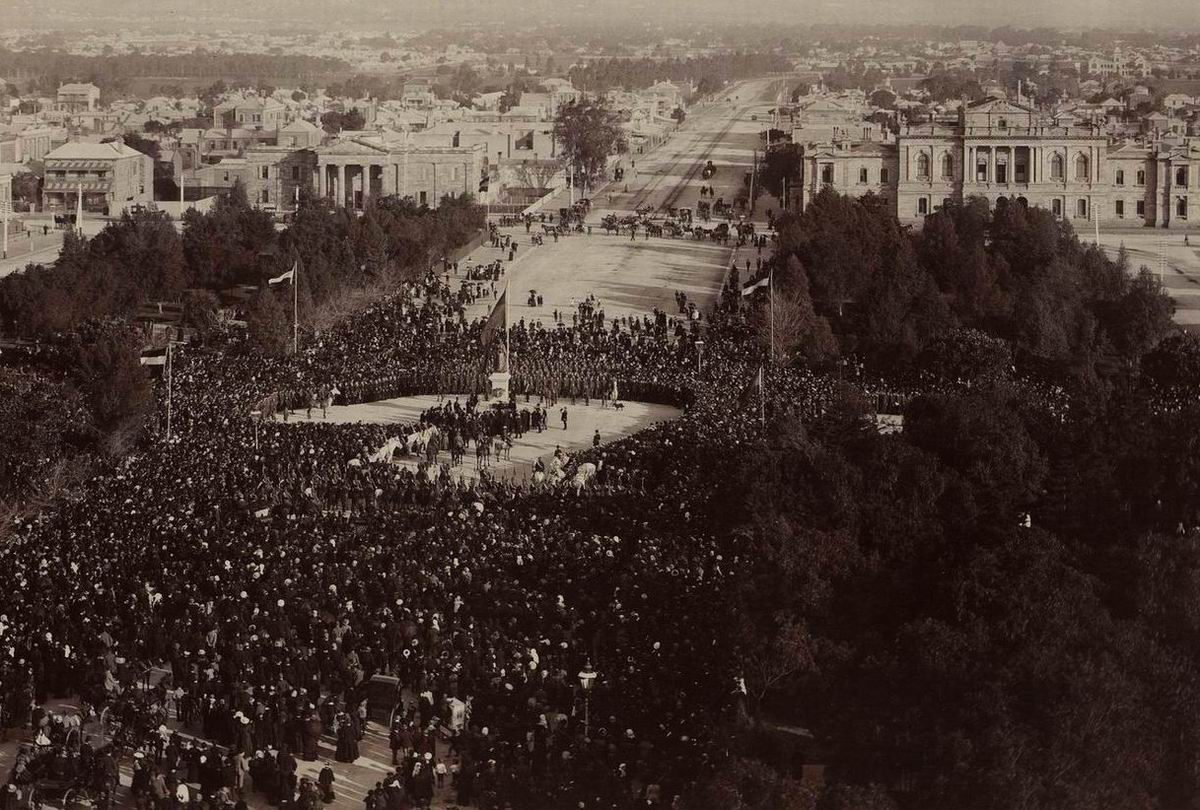
Unveiling the Victoria statue, 1894

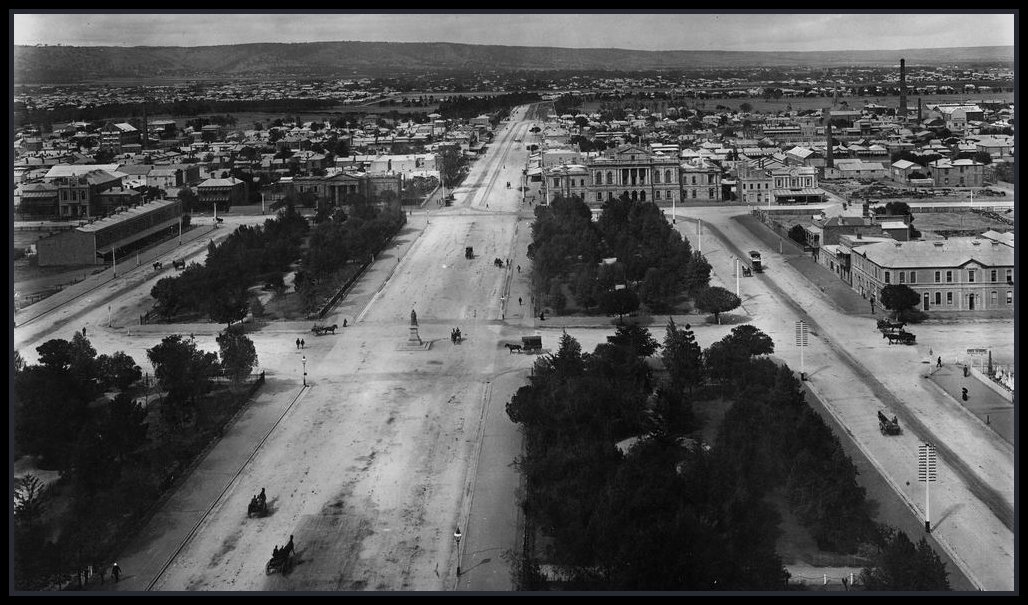
Victoria Square, looking south, 1895

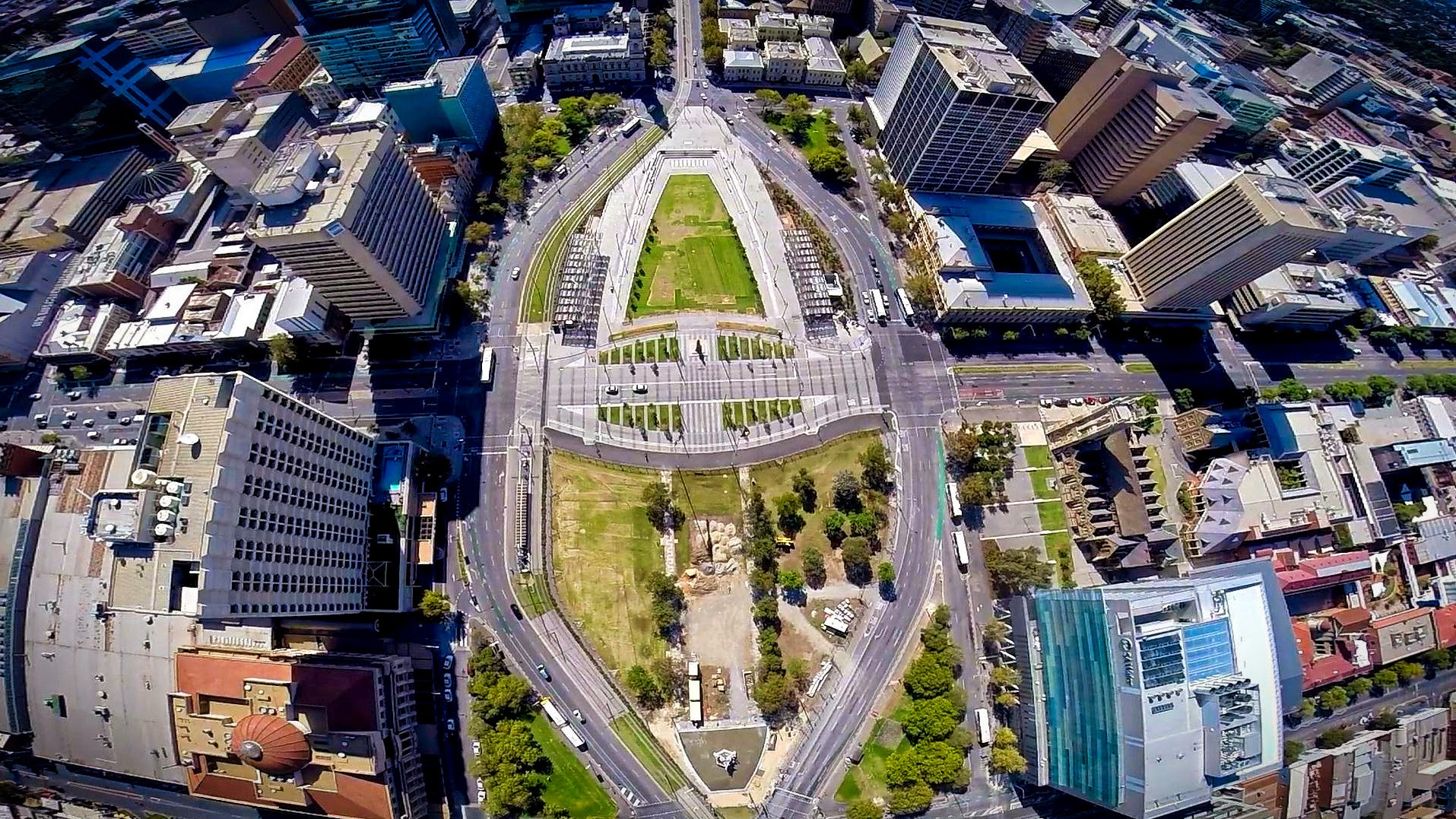
Panoramic view, 2014

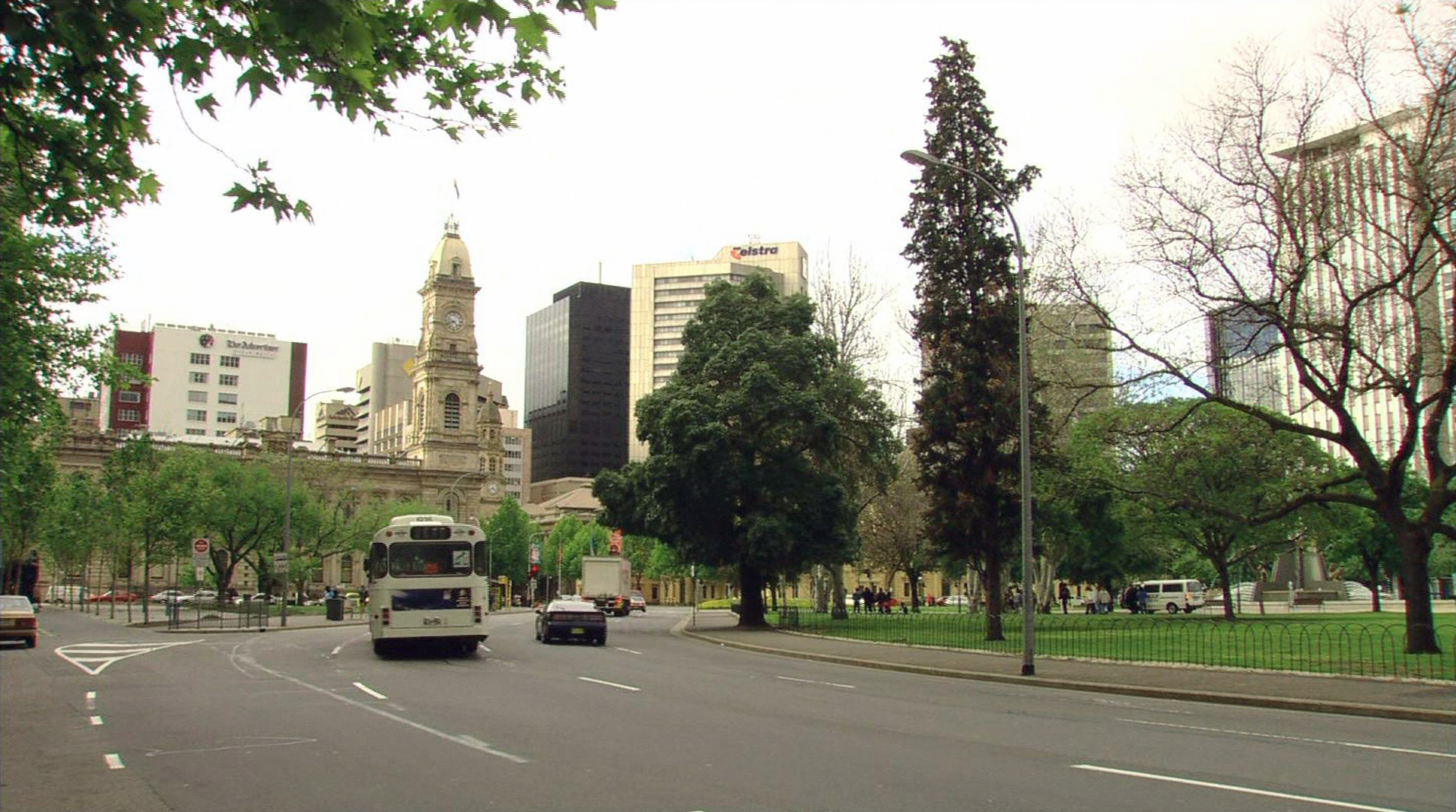
North-western corner of the square, 2006

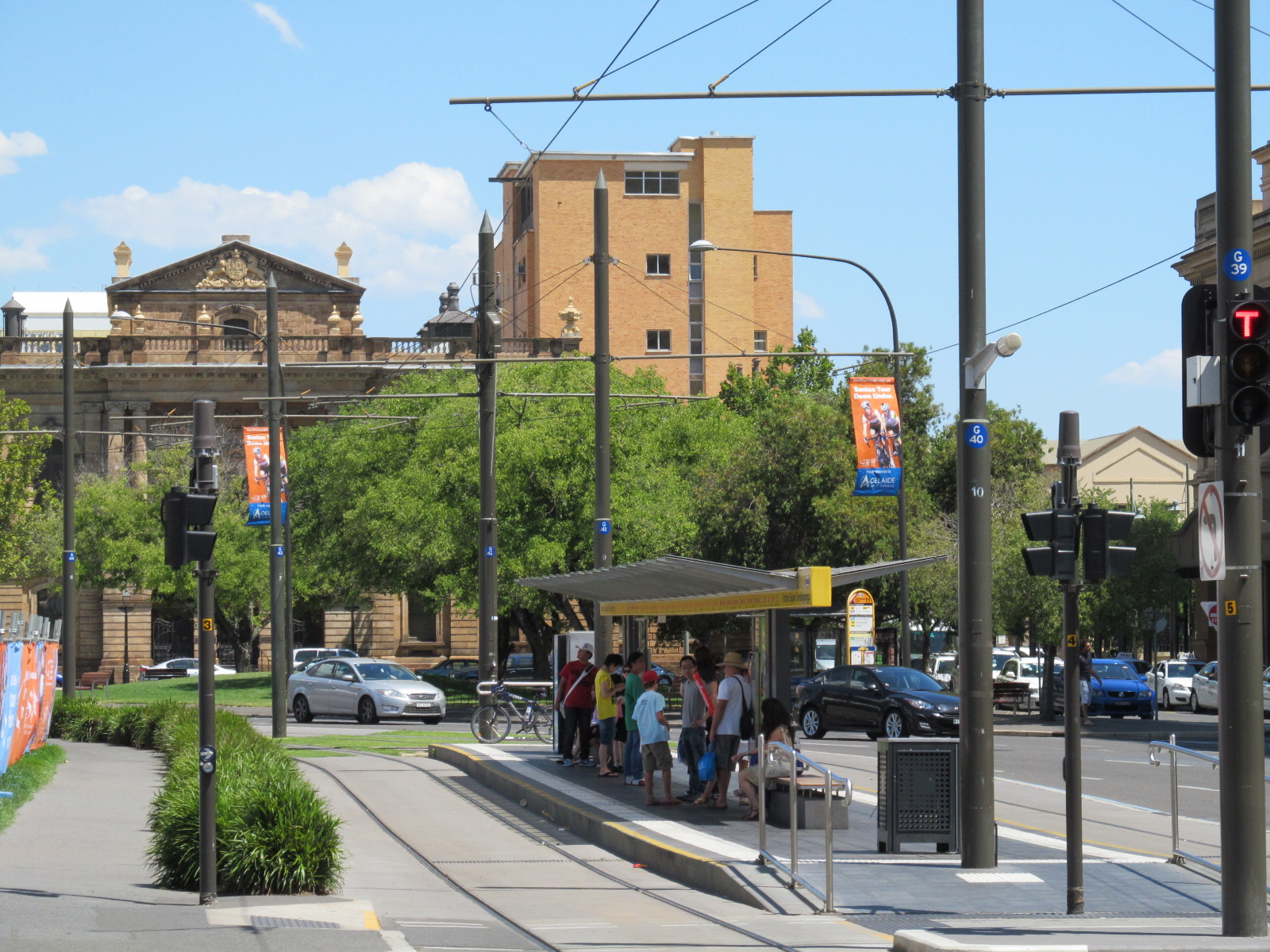
Tram stop, 2012

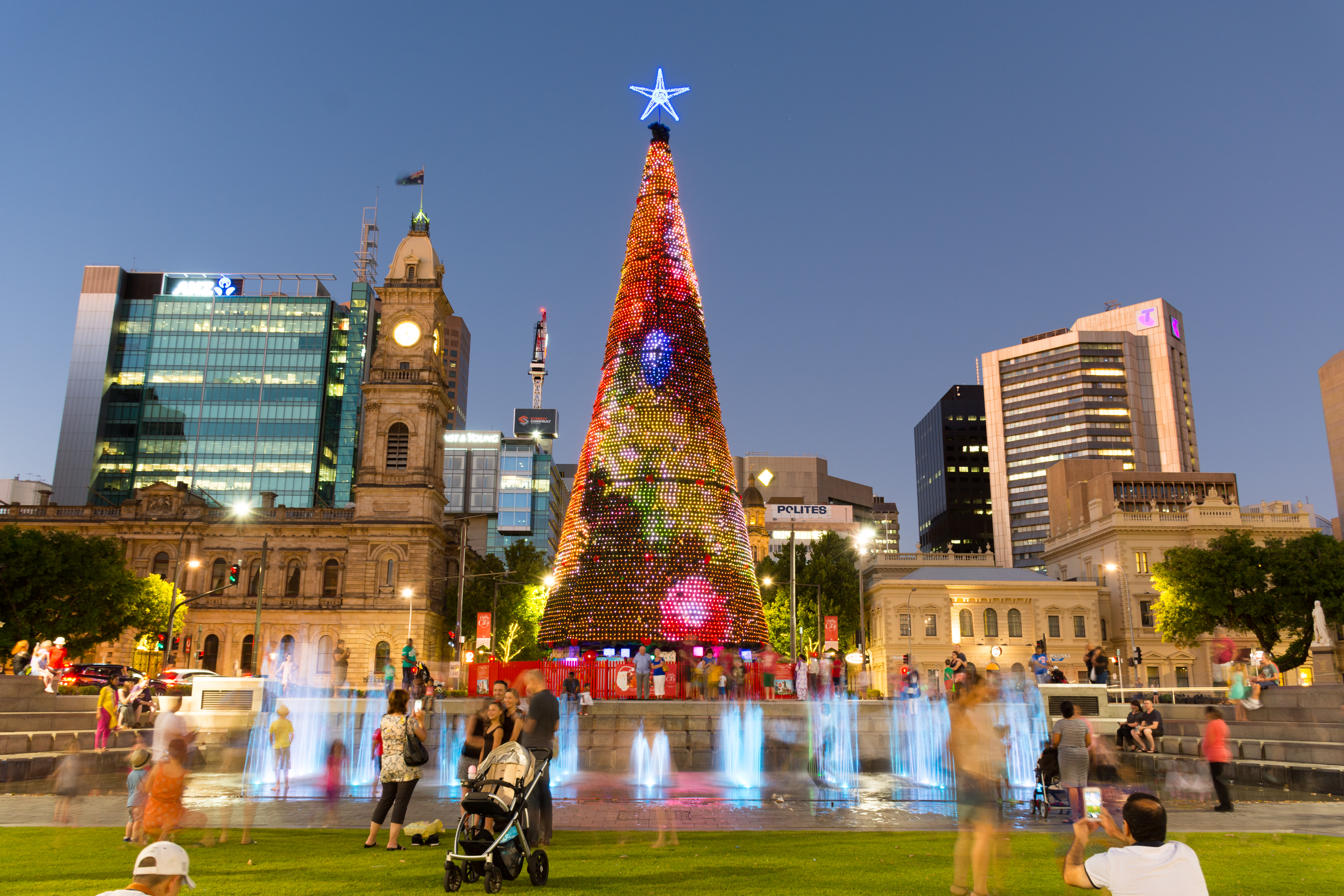
Fountain and Christmas tree, 2015

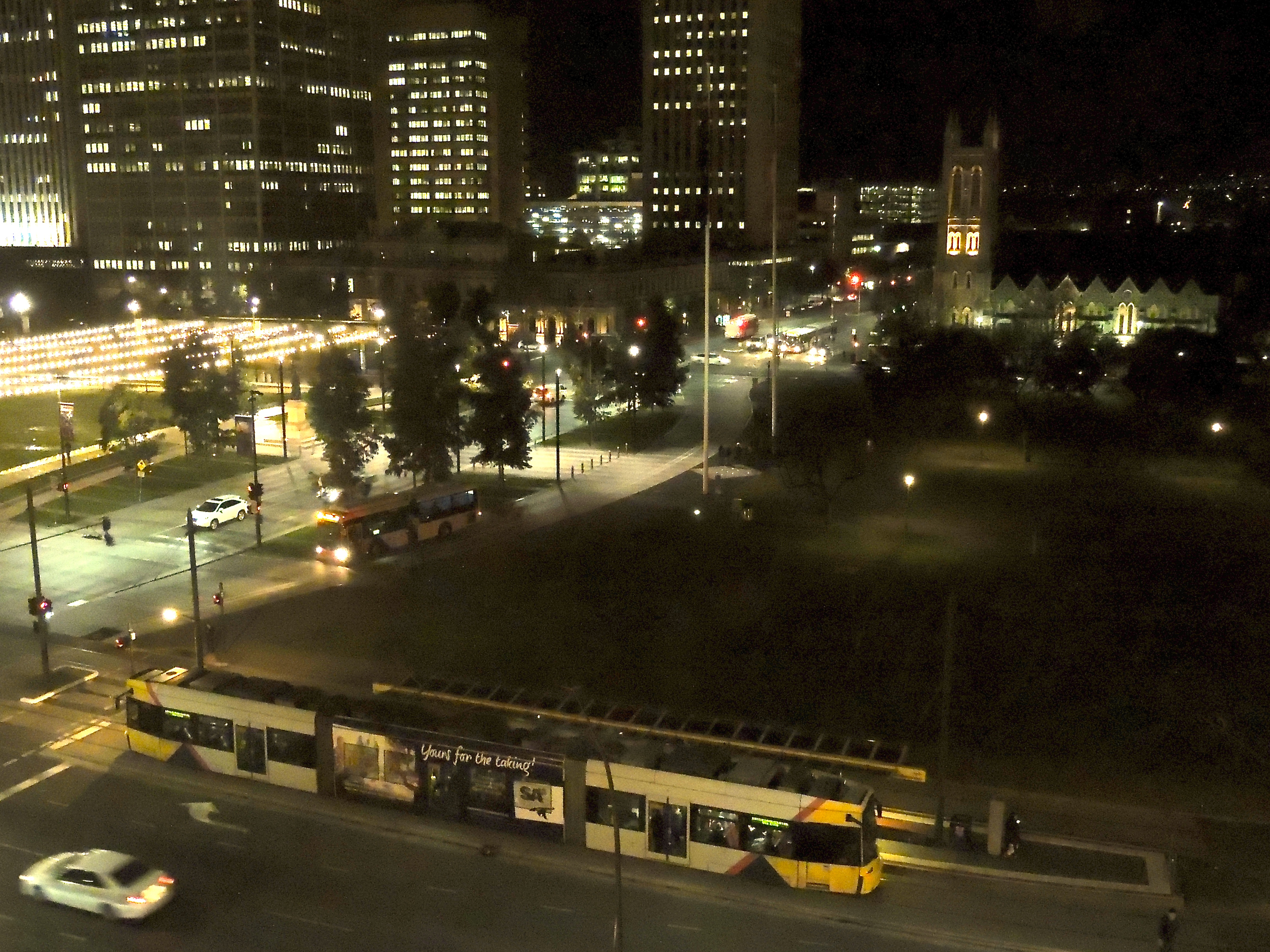
Night view of the square, 2017

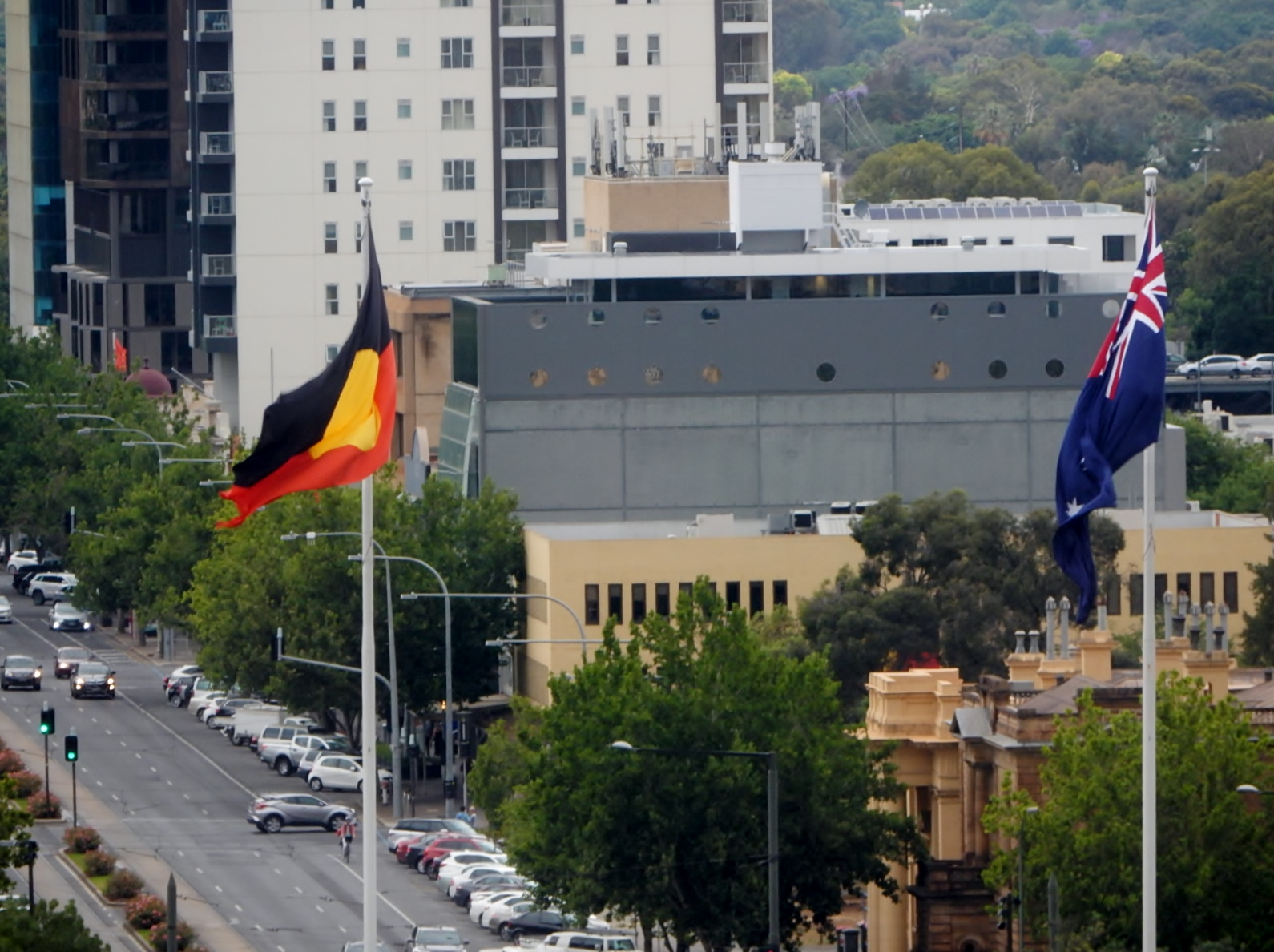
The Aboriginal and National flags in the square, 2017

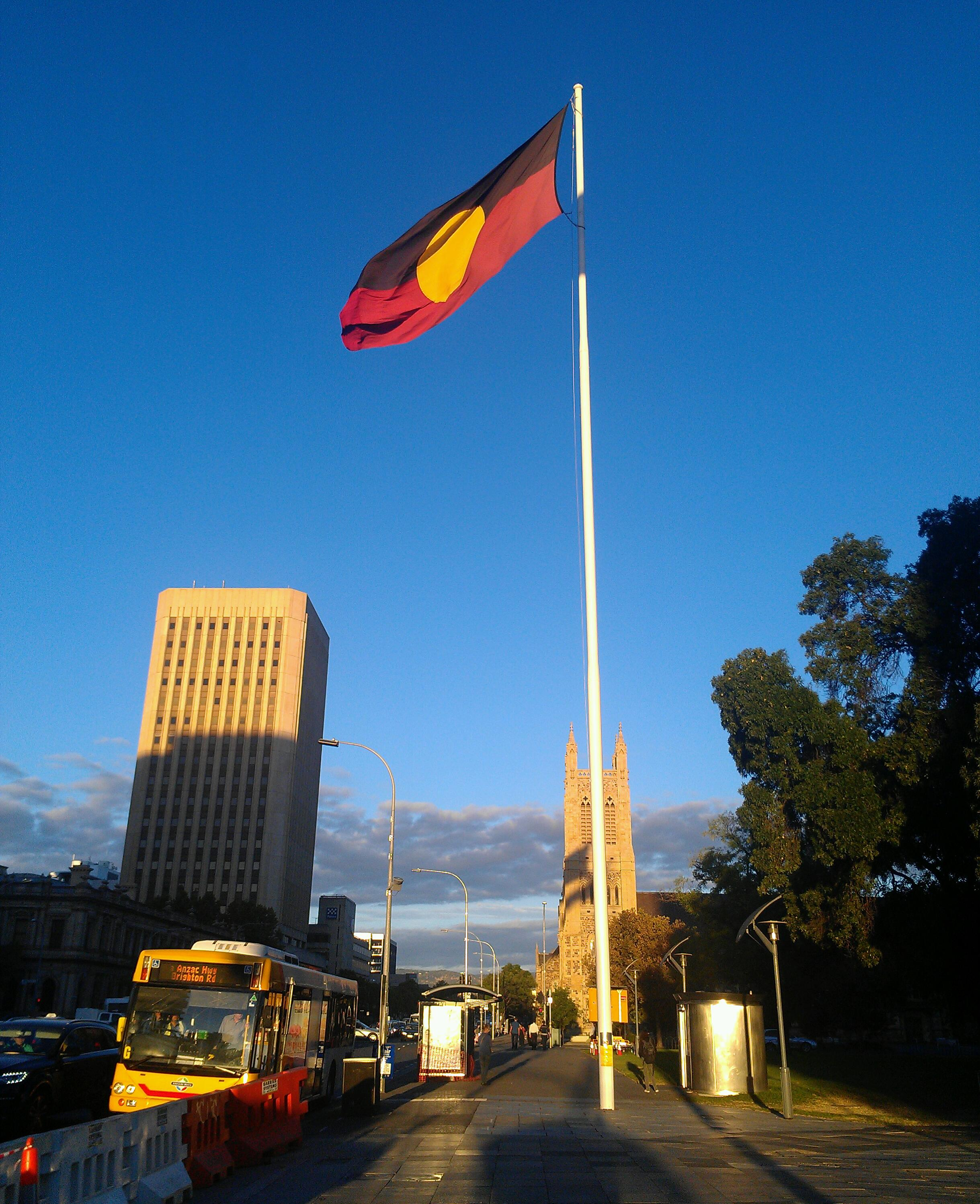
The Aboriginal flag flying in the square, near where the flag was first flown, 2013
