= Kate Hill (nurse) =

Australian nurse (1859–1933)

- Born: 7 May 1859; Walsall, Staffordshire, England
- Died: 2 February 1933 (aged 73); Woodside, South Australia
- Predecessor: Alice Tibbits
- Successor: Sophy Lawrence

Kate Hill (7 May 1859 – 2 February 1933) was an English-born orphan who became a leading Australian nurse. She owned the first private hospital in Adelaide to train nurses (later known as Calvary Wakefield Hospital).

== Life ==
Hill was born in 1859 in Walsall in the English midlands. Her parents were Mary (born Evans) and her journeyman husband Joseph Hill. She lived with her married sister after her parents died. Kate and her friend Alice Tibbits were influenced by Anglican community nurse Sister Dora (Dorothy Wyndlow Pattison) who cared for injured miners. Kate, her sister, and her husband and Alice Tibbits emigrated to South Australia in 1879. Alice and Kate began nursing and training at the newly opened Adelaide Children's Hospital. Alice was the first ever to complete the one year of training, although the training was not well regarded by the trainees.

By 1887, Hill was the hospital's head nurse. She left to rejoin Tibbits who was the owner of a hospital in Wakefield Street. She returned after fifteen months to become the hospital's superintendent of nursing. During the 1890s the hospital enjoyed fundraising and it opened a new wing funded by the philanthropist John Howard Angas.

In 1902, Hill rejoined Tibbitts as a partner and co-owner of the Wakefield Street Hospital. Tibbits acquired further nearby properties in 1905. Under their leadership, it became the first private training hospital for nurses in the colony, and later state, of South Australia. Tibbits was an advocate for nurses to not rely on charity or to follow UK organisation. It was Hill who together with Doctors Thomas George Wilson and A. A. Lendon founded the South Australia branch of the Australasian Trained Nurses' Association.

She retired in 1913 and sold the hospital to Sophy Lawrence. She was on the council of the District Trained Nursing Society from 1915. Hill died in Woodside in 1933 and left her estate to her nieces some of which she had trained as nurses.
