= Private duty nursing =

Nurse responsible for a single patient

Private duty nursing is the care of clients by nurses, who may be licensed as RNs (Registered Nurses) or LPNs/LVNs (Licensed Practical Nurses).

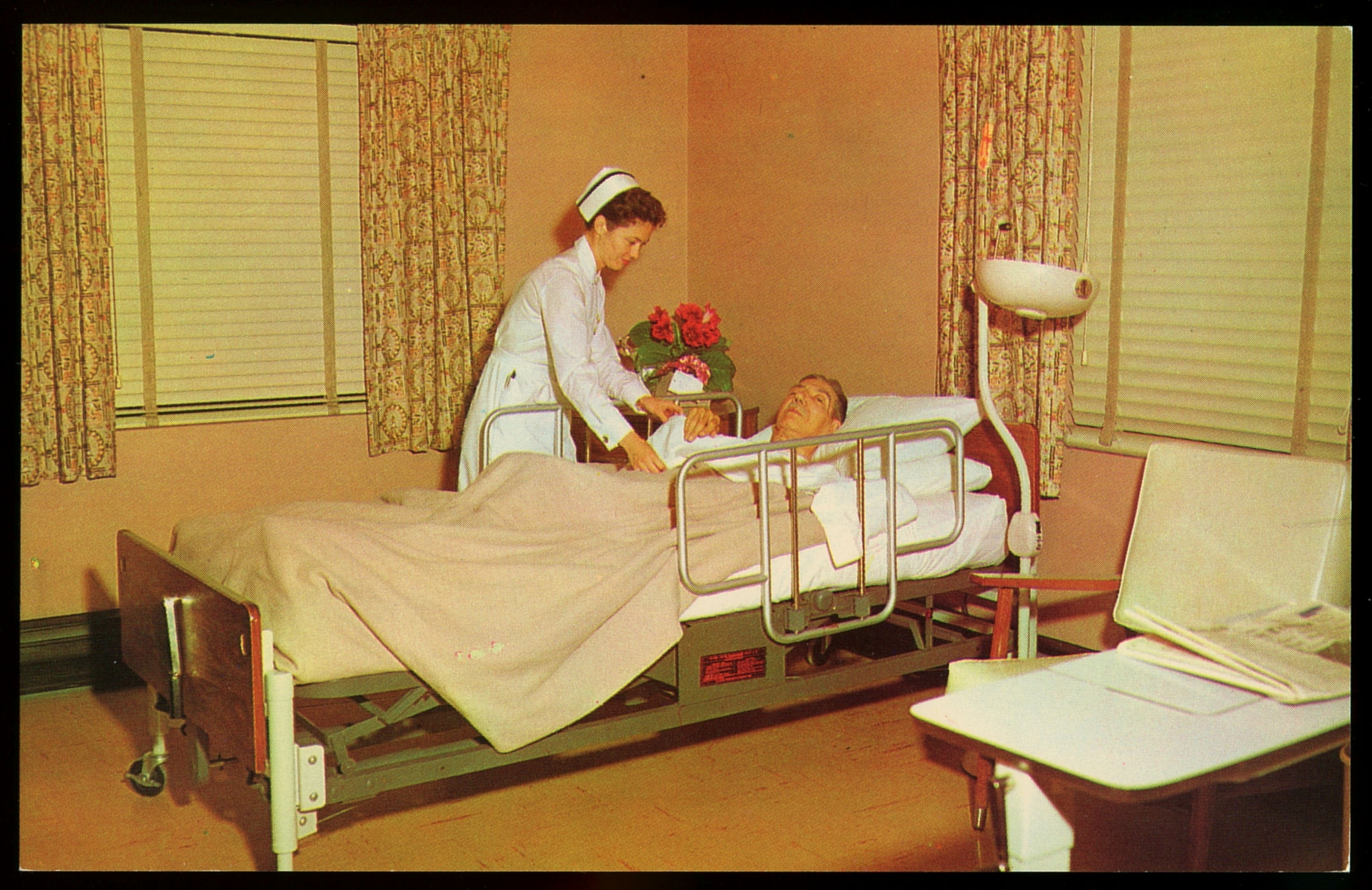
A private duty nurse at Foothill Acres Nursing Homes, Neshanic, New Jersey, circa 1965

In the late 19th and around the beginning of the 20th century, private duty nursing was seen as "the ultimate goal of a trained nurse, both internationally and in Australia". Compared with hospital nursing, its professional status was superior, and the pay was better. Private duty nurses were allowed to work and reside at some hospitals, such as the Private Hospital, Wakefield Street in Adelaide, South Australia.

Most nurses who provide private duty care work one-on-one with individual clients. Such care may be provided in the client's home or in an institution, such as a hospital, nursing home or other such facilities.

Private duty may be paid by private pay, private insurance, managed care organizations, or Medicaid. Many private duty nursing cases involve pediatric patients on Supplemental Security Income (SSI) who have long-term illnesses such as Cerebral Palsy (CP) and Traumatic Brain Injuries (TBI). Many patients need care for a Gastrostomy Tube (G-Tube), Tracheostomy (Trach) or Ventilator (Vent). Private duty nurses are usually either Registered Nurses (RNs) or Licensed Practical/Vocational Nurses (LPN/LVNs).

Many private duty nurses are self-employed or work as contractors. Others work in the ever-growing field of home care. The practice of private duty nursing was in many senses a precursor to a rise (in the 1980s) of wider-scale nurses entrepreneurs. Non-medical care can be provided by the nurse but is most often provided by unlicensed assistive personnel such as nursing assistants, home health aides, personal care attendants, sitters, professional homemakers, or individuals with other titles. These caregivers often help with hygiene and housekeeping tasks for their clients, but they cannot provide skilled nursing care.
