= Listed buildings in Hatherton, Staffordshire =

Hatherton is a civil parish in the district of South Staffordshire, Staffordshire, England. It contains three listed buildings that are recorded in the National Heritage List for England. All the listed buildings are designated at Grade II, the lowest of the three grades, which is applied to "buildings of national importance and special interest". The listed buildings consist of a public house, a lodge and a small country house.

== Buildings ==
Name and location	Photograph	Date	Notes
The Four Crosses Inn; 52.68315°N 2.06905°W		1636	The public house is in two parts, both with tile roofs. The older part is timber framed and has two storeys and an attic, an L-shaped plan with a front range, a cross-wing, a porch in the angle, and two parallel rear wings. On the front are three bays, a full-height gabled porch with jettied upper floors, balusters under the attic window, and an inscribed bressumer and a rail. The later part to the left was built in about 1700, it is in red brick with quoins, and a coped parapet ramped down at the ends. There are three storeys and two bays, and the windows are casements with raised keystones and aprons.
Longford Lodge; 52.68040°N 2.05169°W	—	c. 1800	The lodge is roughcast and has a pyramidal tile roof. There is one storey, a square plan, two bays, and a later flat-roofed extension to the left. The doorway in the lean-to porch has an ogee-headed fanlight, and the windows are casements with Gothic tracery.
Hatherton Hall; 52.69500°N 2.06079°W	—	1817	A small country house in Tudor Gothic style, it is rendered with a first floor cornice band, an embattled parapet, and a hipped slate roof. There are two storeys and a west front of seven bays, the middle three bays having a two-storey bowed projection, and octagonal corner turrets with embattled and domed pinnacles. The south front has four bays and contains a doorway with a Tudor arch and panelled spandrels, flanked by octagonal piers with domed pinnacles, and above it is an embattled cornice. The windows are transomed and have two lights with Tudor-arched heads, and above them is a Tudor hood mould. There is a service wing recessed to the right with three bays and sash windows.
