= Hatherton, Staffordshire =

Hatherton
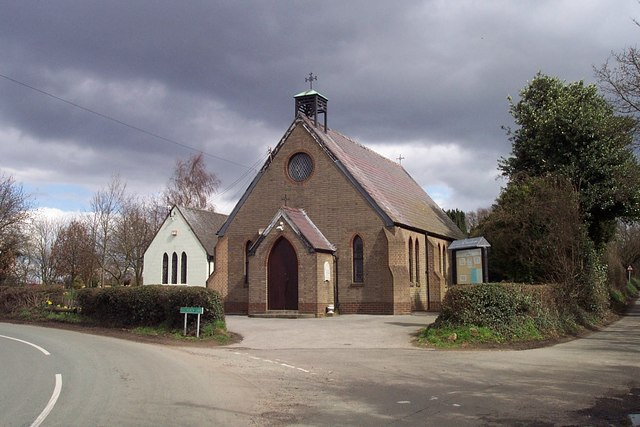
- St. Saviour, Hatherton
- Interactive map of Hatherton
- Coordinates: 52.6908°N 2.0615°W
- Country: England
- County: Staffordshire

Hatherton is a settlement and civil parish located 3 1/4 miles (5.2 km) south-east of Penkridge, and on the western edge of modern-day Cannock, Staffordshire, England, and lying adjacent to and north of Watling Street, now the A5.

The civil parish include the village of Calf Heath.

Hatherton was given to Wolverhampton monastery by Lady Wulfruna in 994. Its name, Hagerthorndun in the Domesday Book, means "the hill where Hawthorns grow". It was once an exclave of Wolverhampton.

Hatherton gave its name to the title of Baron Hatherton, and thus to the now-derelict, nearby, Hatherton Canal.

The Four Crosses inn at Hatherton features an inscription dated '1636N'. Hatherton Hall is an 1817, late-Georgian house, stucco finished, replacing a former Norman hall. The village church, St Saviour, dates from 1876.

== Notable people ==
- Alice Tibbits (1854–1932) was a pioneer of nursing in the colony of South Australia in the late 19th and early 20th centuries, responsible for establishing the first training hospital in South Australia at the Private Hospital, Wakefield Street in Adelaide. She named one of the new hospital buildings "Hatherton".

== See also ==
- Listed buildings in Hatherton, Staffordshire
