= Angas Street =

Street in Adelaide, South Australia

Angas Street South Australia
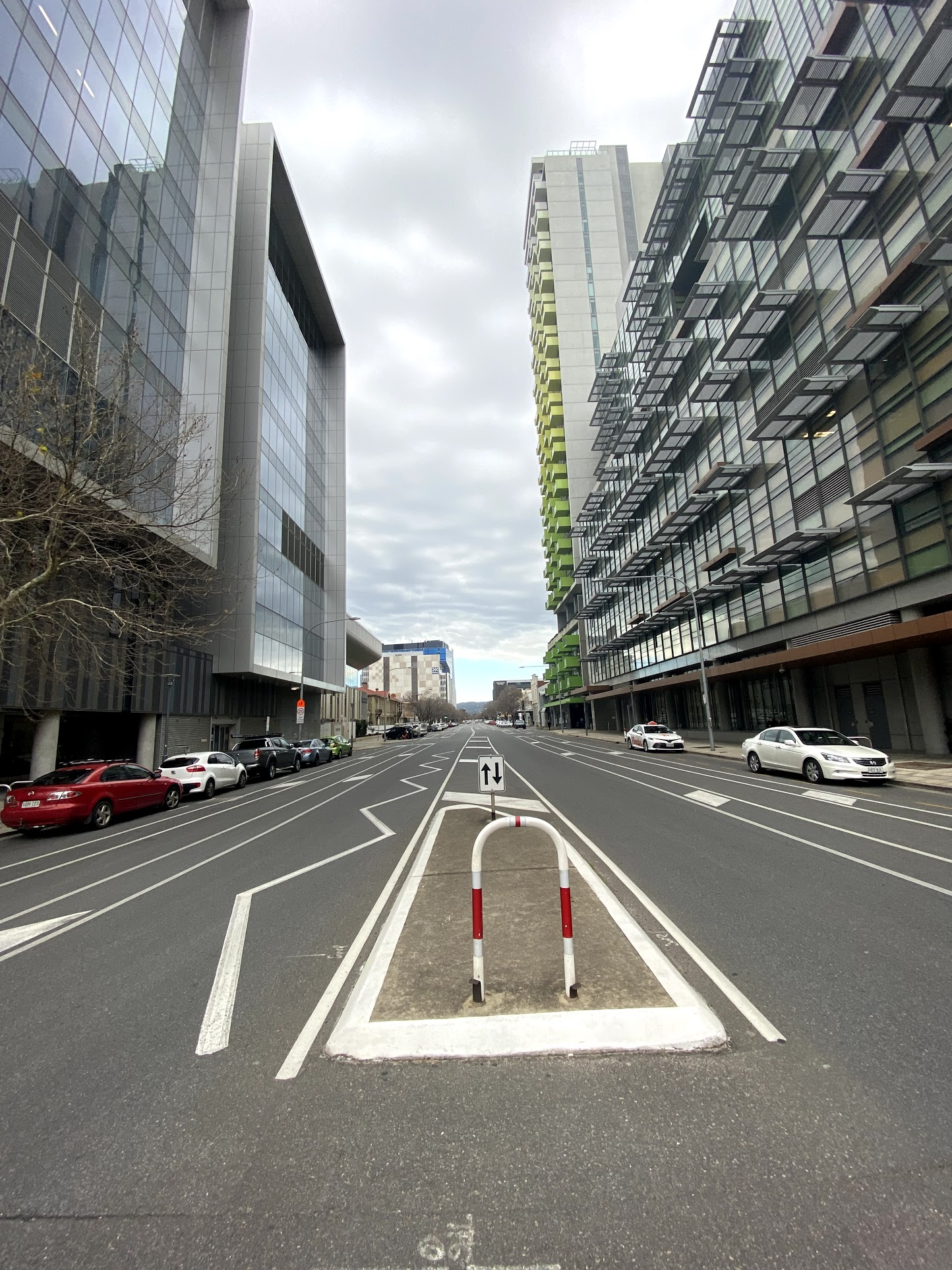
- Angas Street, looking east from King William Street in July 2021
- Coordinates: 34.930127°S 138.600139°E (West end); 34.929362°S 138.615325°E (East end)

General information
- Type: Street
- Location: Adelaide city centre
- Length: 1.4 km (0.9 mi)
- Opened: 1837

Major junctions
- West end: King William Street; Adelaide
- Victoria Square; Pulteney Street; Frome Street; Hutt Street
- East end: East Terrace; Adelaide

Location(s)
- LGA(s): City of Adelaide

Angas Street is a main street in the Adelaide city centre, South Australia. The rear of St Aloysius College faces the street, and various law courts are on the street, including the Dame Roma Mitchell Building.

Angas Street runs from the southern end of Victoria Square to East Terrace. It is one of the intermediate-width streets of the Adelaide grid, and is 1 1/2 chains (99 ft; 30 m) wide.

== History ==
The street is named after George Fife Angas in recognition of his chairmanship of the South Australian Company.

Angas Street was the site of the Municipal Tramways Trust depot from 1923 until 1986, on the north side not far from Victoria Square. At its largest, the depot had 19 tram tracks entering, all from facing east. There was never a tram route along Angas Street; entry and exit from the depot required shunting on a dead end stub of track in Angas Street.

== Notable buildings ==
- Dame Roma Mitchell Building, Commonwealth Law Courts, no. 1–15
- Kodo Apartments, no. 29, designed by Woods Bagot and at the time slated to be the tallest residential block in the city, at 30 storeys
- Royalty Theatre, no. 65, as of May 2022 owned and managed by the Calisthenic Association of SA
- Adelaide City Seventh-day Adventist Church, no. 82
- South Australia Police (SAPOL) headquarters, no. 100
- Calvary Adelaide Hospital
- SA Water building
- WEA-SA building, no. 223 previously a warehouse and chocolate factory owned by H H Tandy
- Dom Polski Centre, or Polish Club, no. 230
- The Life Christian Centre, or Life Church, at no. 245 was founded in 1967 to minister to Italian-speaking Adelaideans following a Pentecostal movement in the United States called Christian Church of North America. In 1979, the Christian Church in Australia (CCA) was established, with links to CCNA. CCA has since grown, with churches being founded around Australia. The church bought the building housing the Bakehouse Theatre at no. 255 in 2020.

=== The Arts Theatre ===
The Arts Theatre is at no. 53. It is home to the Adelaide Repertory Theatre, which had the theatre built in 1963. The 500-seat theatre was built for £45,000, on land bought 15 years prior by the long-running amateur theatre company. It has since become a major venue for other amateur companies as well as Adelaide Fringe and other performances. It hosts around 14 shows per year.

=== Bakehouse Theatre ===
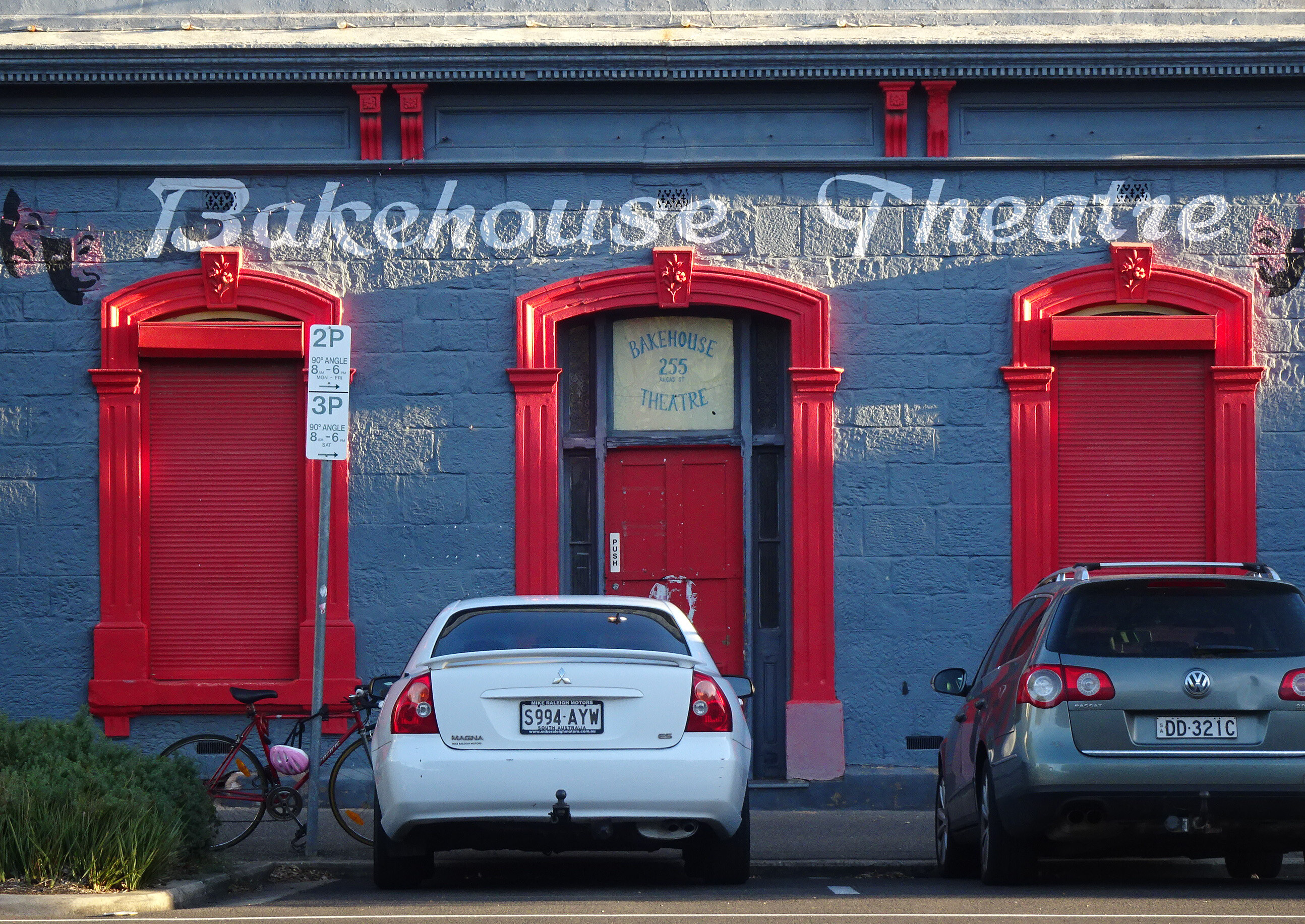
Bakehouse Theatre at 255 Angas Street

The building at no. 255 started life as Lovell's Bakery in the 1890s. It was subsequently used as the bookshop of the Adelaide branch of the Communist Party of Australia, and for a while was home to Farmer's Radio and Suburban Taxis. In the 1970s, Keith Gallasch OAM (who went on to found RealTime magazine with his partner Virginia Baxter OAM) and David Allen, then both lecturers at the Salisbury College of Advanced Education, formed a theatre group comprising some of their students, called Troupe. They rented the warehouse-like building, calling it The Red Shed, which spawned a new theatre company, the Red Shed company, which later moved to Unley. The Troupe collective grew, and performed new Australian works, including some penned by Gallasch.

In the 1990s Peter Green took over, renting the property at a low rent from the Communist Party, and renovated the old theatre, reopening it as The Bakehouse Theatre in 1997. Arts SA provided some funding until 2006, when Pamela Munt and her daughter Melanie took over the theatre for their Unseen Theatre Company, which specialises in works by Terry Pratchett. The theatre was expanded to include a second performance space, and played host to a number of resident theatre companies as well as Adelaide Fringe shows. The theatre hosted more than 250 shows, including British comedian Ben Elton.

In early 2022, the theatre was given notice to vacate the building by its new owners, the Life Christian Centre. The theatre closed after its final run of A Streetcar Named Desire on 7 May 2022.

== Junction list ==
Location	km	mi	Destinations	Notes
Adelaide city centre	0	0.0	Victoria Square, King William Street	Continues as Gouger Street
Adelaide city centre	0.55	0.34	Pulteney Street	
Adelaide city centre	0.75	0.47	Frome Street / Regent Street North	
Adelaide city centre	1.1	0.68	Hutt Street	
Adelaide city centre	1.4	0.87	East Terrace	
1.000 mi = 1.609 km; 1.000 km = 0.621 mi
