= Calvary Adelaide Hospital =

- Little Company of Mary Health Care
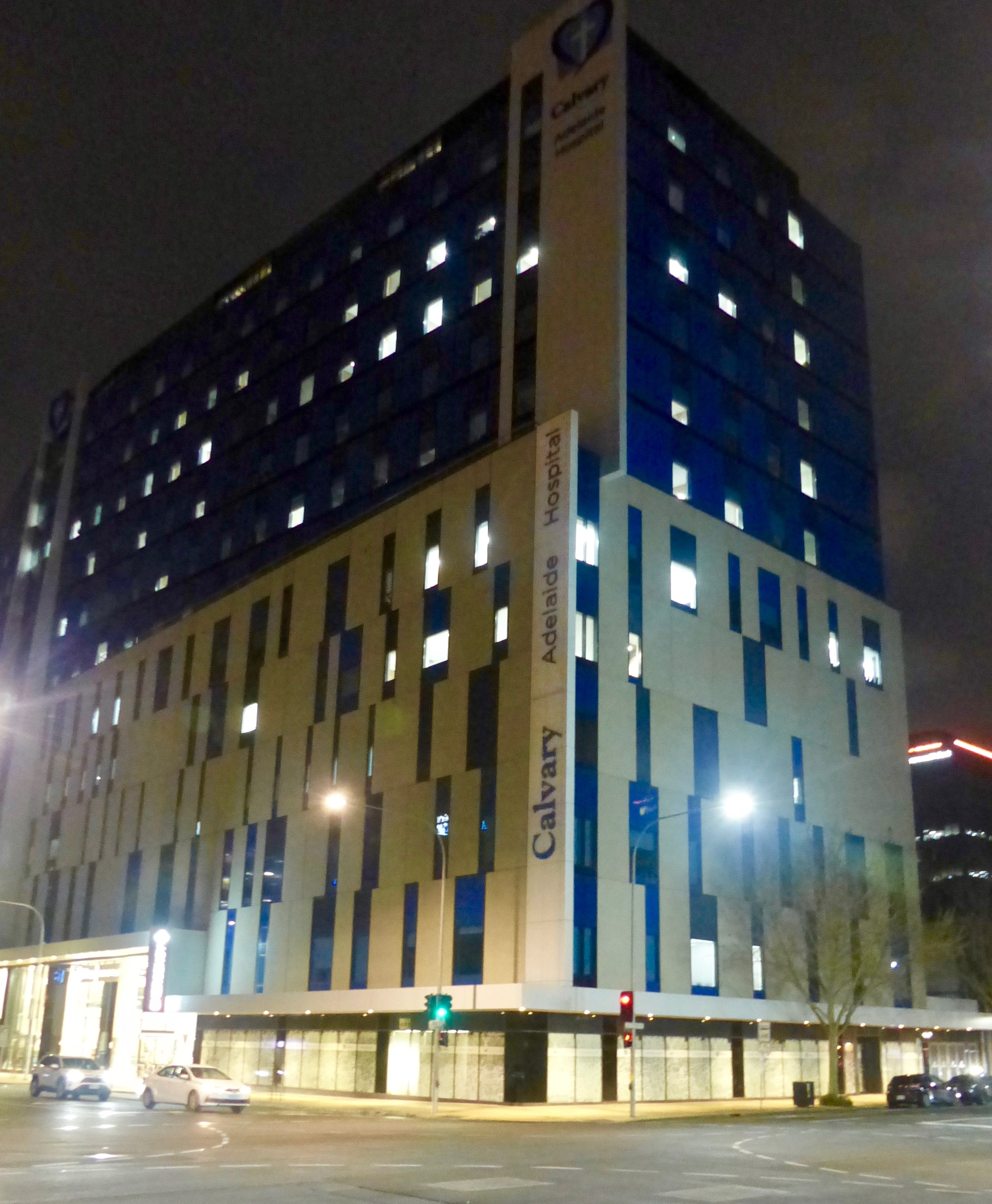

Geography
- Location: 120 Angas Street, Adelaide, South Australia, Australia
- Coordinates: 34.9294°S 138.6054°E

Organisation
- Care system: Private, not-for-profit
- Type: General

Services
- Emergency department: Yes
- Beds: 344

History
- Founded: 6 January 2020

Links
- Website: www.calvarycare.org.au/hospitals/calvary-adelaide-hospital
- Lists: Hospitals in Australia

Calvary Adelaide Hospital is a Catholic private hospital located on Angas Street in the Adelaide central business district, South Australia. It opened in January 2020, replacing and expanding the former Calvary Wakefield Hospital and Calvary Rehabilitation Hospital and is operated by Little Company of Mary Health Care, also known as Calvary Health Care.

It is the largest private hospital in South Australia, providing acute medical and surgical care with inpatient and outpatient facilities, and specialising in orthopaedic, cardiac and neurosurgical services.

The 344-bed facility includes 16 operating theatres and a 20-bed Level 3 intensive care unit staffed by specialist intensivists 24 hours a day. The hospital is South Australia's only private provider of a 24-hour emergency department.

== History ==
Planning for a new hospital to replace the ageing Calvary Wakefield Hospital began in the mid-2010s. Construction commenced in 2016 following approval of plans to consolidate Calvary's Wakefield Street and rehabilitation services into a single city-based facility.

The hospital opened to patients on 6–7 January 2020, coinciding with the closure of Calvary Wakefield Hospital.

== Ownership and operation ==
Calvary Adelaide Hospital is operated by Little Company of Mary Health Care (trading as Calvary Health Care) as part of its national network of private hospitals and aged care services across Australia.

== Facilities and services ==
Calvary Adelaide Hospital provides acute medical and surgical care across a range of specialties, including:

- Orthopaedics
- Cardiology and cardiac catheterisation services
- Neurosurgery and spinal surgery
- Rehabilitation (inpatient and outpatient)
- General medicine and surgery

The hospital's Emergency department operates 24 hours a day, seven days a week, and is the only private emergency department in Adelaide providing continuous service.

Support and allied health services include Physiotherapy, Occupational therapy, speech pathology, dietetics and pastoral care, along with diagnostic services such as radiology, endoscopy and pathology.

== Building ==
The hospital is a 12-storey development with an estimated construction cost of A$345–400 million, located on the corner of Angas and Pulteney Streets adjacent to South Australia Police headquarters.

The building includes 344 beds, 16 operating theatres, interventional and procedural suites, and a 20-bed Level 3 intensive care unit.

The hospital was developed by Commercial & General and constructed by the John Holland Group. Calvary operates the facility under a 30-year lease arrangement.
