= Robert Haining (minister) =

Robert Haining (14 August 1802 – 26 April 1874) was the first Church of Scotland minister in South Australia.

== History ==
Haining was born in Maxton, Roxburghshire, Scotland, to the Rev. John Haining and his wife Wilhelmina Haining, née Wilson. He was educated either at John Watson's Institution or George Watson's Hospital and Edinburgh University, but was not ordained until 1841 after being selected by the General Assembly of the Church of Scotland for missionary service in South Australia. That same year he married and left on the Orissa arriving in November 1841.

European settlement was in its very early days and the Scottish settlers widely scattered, but he was able to conduct his first service at the (Anglican) Trinity Church on North Terrace on 28 November 1841, just seven days after arrival in the new colony with a sizable congregation. A reception was held on St. Andrew's Day (30 November) at which some 50 gentlemen attended. and a "Friends of the Church of Scotland" was formed to support their new minister: William Smillie (chairman), George Tinline (treasurer) and committee John Calder, A. L. Elder, D. MacFarlane, Angus Maclaine, George Stevenson, Andrew Murray, and George Young.

The spirit of cooperation from the other Christian denominations continued over the following months, with Haining conducting services at the Friends Meeting House, Adelaide and the Congregational Church in Freeman Street (now Gawler Place) and the Wesleyan Meeting House in Hindley Street. A start was made on St. Andrew's Presbyterian Church on Grenfell Street and on 6 February 1844 the foundation stone was laid and the first service taken by Haining on the morning of 14 July 1844, with Congregationalist pastor T. Q. Stow taking the evening service.

Haining's congregation eventually outgrew the building and a new Church of St. Andrew was constructed on Wakefield Street, the foundation stone being laid on 13 May 1858 and the first service held on 13 March 1859.

Haining continued to officiate as pastor until 1871, when owing to failing health he retired to Glenelg, and was succeeded by Rev. James Henderson.

[Haining] was a man of broad sympathies allied with strict orthodoxy, cultured and well-stored mind, genial temperament and warm heart, but had a somewhat retiring and unassuming disposition. His sterling qualities won for him and retained many friends among all denominations, who will mourn his sudden departure.

== Other interests ==
- Haining was appointed to the Destitute Board in 1849
- He was also a member of the Aborigines’ Friends Society, the Adelaide City Mission and the Board of Public Competitive Examinations.

== Family ==
Robert Haining married Jessy Grant ( –1890) in 1841. Their children included:

- Robert Grant Haining (1842–1919) married Alice Marshall ( – 1888) in 1887; he married again, to Julia Fyffe ( – ) in 1899
- Wilhelmina Wilson "Mina" Haining (1844 – 26 November 1925) married Police Inspector John Henry Hayden Roe (c. 1835 – 27 January 1877) in 1862. He left Clare for WA in 1874, died on the Omeo off Cape York. She started a school in Glenelg, married again to George Edward Young (15 February 1852 – 27 September 1937) on 23 December 1882. George, later (Anglican) Dean of Adelaide, was son of the Rev. Peter Young, Rector of North Witham and Prebendary of Lincoln, England.
- Jessy Grant Haining (1849–1895) married Charles Walter Smith ( – ) in 1883
- George James Haining (1854–1928) married Julia Marion MacDonald ( –1938) in 1890

== Presbyterian denominations of early Adelaide ==
- United Secession Church officially became United Presbyterian Church in 1847

Ministers: Ralph Drummond 1839 to 1857; Peter Mercer (probationary) 1855 to 1856; James Lyall 1857 to 1897; George Davidson 1898 to
Buildings: Angas Street schoolroom, near Victoria Square (1839–1842); Gouger Street, near Victoria Square (1842–1864); Flinders Street (1864–1956) demolished 1957

- Established Church of Scotland

Ministers: Robert Haining 1841 to 1871; James Henderson 1871 to 1881 (deposed)
Buildings: St. Andrew's Presbyterian Church on Grenfell Street (1844– ); St. Andrew's Presbyterian Church on Wakefield Street (1859– )

- Free Church of Scotland

Ministers: John Gardner 1850 to 1868; James Davidson 1870 to 1876
Building: Chalmers Church (now Scots Church) on North Terrace (1851 – present)

A deed of union of the three branches of the Presbyterian Churches was signed in Adelaide on 10 May 1865 by John Gardner (Chalmers Church), Robert Haining (St. Andrew's, Wakefield Street), John Anderson (Strathalbyn), James Gordon (Gawler), James Lyall (Flinders Street), W. Davidson (Clare), Alexander Law (Mount Barker), and James Moddich (Mount Pleasant)
