= Gavin F. Gardner =

Gavin Forrest Gardner (10 or 11 April 1848 – 20 March 1919) was a founder and longtime director of the Adelaide Stock Exchange.

== History ==
Gardner was born in Birkenhead, England, to the (Independent Presbyterian) Rev. John Gardner and his wife Catherine Gardner née Forrest.

The Rev. Dr. Gardner, wife, servant and three children arrived in South Australia aboard Condor in March 1850 after accepting a call to take over the newly erected Chalmers Church (now Scots Church) on North Terrace, Adelaide, and served that congregation with distinction until 1868, when he accepted a call to Launceston Tasmania (which appointment got off to a bad start, then deteriorated and ended in bitter hostility).

Gardner was educated at J. L. Young's Adelaide Educational Institution and found employment in 1867 at the English, Scottish and Australian Bank (later ANZ), first at Adelaide, then at Port Darwin, and later at Mount Gambier.

He left the bank to go into business on his own account, and served as secretary to various companies. At the formation of the Adelaide Stock Exchange in 1887 he was one of the original 50 members, of which number only S. E. Beach, D. Fotheringham, A. F. Weaver, and S. Wills outlasted him. He had an office in the Royal Exchange building, 96 King William Street, from 1888 to 1917.

At that meeting he was appointed hon. secretary and treasurer pro tem under president Henry Bellingham, and in March 1889 he was elected to the committee under George Sydney Aldridge, which seat he retained for four years. In 1896 he severed his connection with the exchange, but purchased a seat again in 1911, and continued to be a member up to the time of his death. His close involvement with the minutiae of stock trading made him something of an authority, and his advice was frequently sought and freely given.

As a young man Gardner was a keen horseman, and in later years gardening was his chief recreation. He was a noted collector of fine china and works of art, on which he was considered an authority. He died after a long illness at his home "Airlie" at 9 Trinity Street, College Park, South Australia. The Exchange suspended trading for a quarter of an hour as a mark of respect, and a letter of consolation sent to his widow by the president, Mr. W. B. Carr.

== Family ==
Gavin Forrest Gardner married Mary Josephine Brown (1858–1923) in 1882. Their children were:

- George Gavin Forrest Gardner, Mus. Bac. (c. 1882 – 6 August 1953), organist and school master at St Peter's College
- Dr. John Forrest Gardner, M.B., B.S. (30 July 1890 – 5 August 1928) married Josephine Florey, M.B., B.S. on 17 February 1917. She was a daughter of Joseph Florey, lived in Melbourne
- Catherine Forrest Gardner (1883–1958) married Gordon Edward Sunter in 1909
- Edith Josephine Gardner (28 February 1885 – 1973) married Cuthbert Viner Smith in 1910
- Mary Beatrice Gardner (30 May 1887 – ) married John Eric McGlashan in 1915, lived in Adelaide
- Rita Elizabeth Gardner (6 April 1889 – 1972) married Keith McEwin in 1914, lived in Balaklava
- Ethel F. Gardner (1897–1976) married Keith Rogers Scarfe on 25 September 1919, lived in Adelaide

William Forrest Gardner, a noted surgeon, was a brother.
