= George Stonehouse =

Baptist minister in South Australia (1808–1871)

George Stonehouse (1 July 1808 – 24 July 1871) was a Baptist minister in South Australia, founder of the LeFevre Terrace Baptist Church, North Adelaide, and first president of Adelaide Theological College.

== History ==
Stonehouse was born in Kent, the son and grandson of Baptist ministers. He was five years at Newport Pagnell College ("The Newport Academy for Dissenting Ministers") under Thomas Palmer Bull (1773–1859), then was put in charge of the Baptist church at Middleton Cheney, in South Northamptonshire, where he served for seven years. His next charge was a church in Chipping Norton, where he served from 1838 to 1945, but the cold wet climate of Oxfordshire was affecting his health, and when he heard George Fife Angas and other representatives of the South Australian Company offered him a position as president of a projected Baptist college in the warmer climate of the new colony he accepted, and arrived in the colony with his wife and four children aboard Templar in November 1845.

The Baptist Church was among the earliest established in South Australia, meeting at Mr. Shepherdson's schoolroom, North Terrace, and at the home of William Finlayson, the first service being held on 2 September 1838. David McLaren served as lay pastor when his other duties permitted, relieved for a short time by Rev. J. Peacock, by which time they were meeting at a chapel in Hindley Street, the colony's first, which they had plans to purchase. Maclaren returned to England in January 1841, and Marcus Collison officiated for a short time, during which attendance withered. Finlayson, Burford, Captain Scott, John Neill, and others took the services until Rev. Isaac Prior came out from England aboard Caleb Angas in February 1842. A schism occurred, with one group meeting at Zion Chapel on Pulteney Street while Prior and his adherents met at the schoolroom in Angas Street lately vacated by Ralph Drummond's United Presbyterians. This church failed to thrive, but a later resurgence of Baptists established the Ebenezer Chapel in Brougham Place, North Adelaide in 1843, where James Allen served as minister until 1845, when he left foe England, and was succeeded by Titherington and Gill, then in 1847 Rev. Stonehouse was invited to transfer from Angaston.

Plans for the Baptist college had been dropped for want of funds, so in 1846 he opened a private school "Angaston Manual Labour College" in Angaston, which he ran for around two years. In 1847 he was called to take over the Ebenezer Chapel in Brougham Place. Then in 1848 Rev. James Allen returned from England, and a large section of the congregation elected to have him resume his place as their pastor, and Stonehouse and 30 or 40 adherents seceded, and began meeting at Salem Chapel, the old Wesleyan building in Kermode Street, North Adelaide. They then set about establishing a Baptist chapel on LeFevre Terrace, where the first service, with a crowd of worshippers of various denominations, was held on 21 April 1850. Several Christian ministers officiated, notably (Presbyterian) Rev. John Gardner.

In 1863 a Baptist Association was formed, bringing together the various sects of the church.

Stonehouse began suffering a weakness of the throat which so affected his voice that his preaching was almost inaudible, and in 1869 was forced to retire from the pulpit, to be replaced by the Rev. J. Langdon Parsons, and was made President of the new Baptist theological college and the tutor of several theological students. The congregation had outgrown the Lefevre Terrace building and services were held in the Temperance Hall, and plans made for a new church building, also on Tynte Street. In December 1869 the foundation stone was laid, and the first service was held in the new North Adelaide Baptist Church on 6 November 1870.

The Adelaide Theological College, largely funded by G. F. Angas, though sponsored by the Baptists, was open to all Christian denominations for a fee. Rev. G. Stonehouse was elected President and Theological Tutor; Rev. S. Mead, M.A. LL.B., undertook the Greek and Hebrew courses; and the Rev. J. Price took Church History. The first two students were John N. Birks (grandson of George Vause Birks) and Gordon Bottrill

Stonehouse had been in failing health for some years, and during the last few months had suffered greatly from sciatica. He died after an acute attack of bronchitis, followed by a stroke, after which he died.

Few men were more generally esteemed for consistent conduct, for quiet unobtrusiveness of manner, and for liberalness of thought, than Mr. Stonehouse; and his removal will be regretted by his brethren in the ministry, and by all who, as Christian worshippers or as personal friends, were permitted to share his wise counsels. Mr. Stonehouse was not a brilliant or eloquent minister, but he had a high appreciation of the importance of his office, and a scrupulous conscientiousness in discharging the duties belonging to it.

== Family ==
George Stonehouse (1 July 1808 – 24 July 1871) married the widow Harriet or Harriette Chittenden née Ballard (1804? 1808? – 13 May 1867) in 1833. Their children were:

- Rebecca Chittenden (c. 1828 – 1 August 1921)
- Emily Stonehouse ( – 4 November 1917) She was an accomplished painter
- Ellen Stonehouse ( – 13 May 1925) married William Parkin (1802 – 31 May 1889) on 28 February 1872.
- his third daughter Anna Maria Stonehouse ( – 13 August 1911) married Wilton Hack (21 May 1843 – 27 February 1923) on 10 May 1870. She was an accomplished painter

- Florence Maria Hack (11 November 1871 –) married William Norman Grant Mackenzie ( – ) on 6 April 1904
- William Wilton Meora Stephen Hack (2 December 1872 – 12 February 1941) married Charlotte Scott Murray (1877 – ) on 25 September 1902
- Charles Corey Hack (27 February 1874 – ) married Ethel G. H. A. Maconochie ( – ) on 29 October 1926
- Wilton Hack (1 September 1878 – 10 April 1933) married Amelia Ellen Cock (1877 – ) on 30 April 1903. Amelia was a daughter of Robert Andrew Cock and Oceana Cock née Schacht ( –1926) who married in 1873

what connection ?

Ellen Stonehouse Parkin (16 March 1880 – 9 November 1966) married Samuel Bolton Lightburn (1881 – 7 August 1939) in 1907
