= South Australian Council of Churches =

The South Australian Council of Churches was a body of leaders from the evangelical Christian churches of the Australian colony or state of South Australia. It was formed to present a unified front to influence public discourse and government policy, and also served to increase communication and cooperation between rival churches with similar aims and philosophies. This article traces the history of the council through a list of its presidents and, to a lesser extent, its secretaries, who through being eligible for reelection, provided stability and continuity of service.

== History ==
- 1896 James Viner Smith (died 1916)

Henry James Holden secretary

- 1898 Robert Smith Casely

James Gray was elected secretary.

- 1900 Dr James Jefferis

Charles Eaton Taplin (Note: C. Eaton Taplin was a son of Rev. George Taplin) (1857–1927), secretary 1900–1906

- 1901, 1903 Rev. John Garrard Raws (died 1929)
- 1903 A. C. Sutherland
- 1905 William Jeffries
- 1906 Rev. S. Lenton
- 1907 A. N. Marshall

W. Penry Jones elected secretary

- 1908 George Davidson

James Delehanty (died 1920) was secretary 1908–1917

- 1909 W. A. Langsford (died 1930)
- 1910 E. Ashby

In 1910 the State Conference of the Churches of Christ, which was not associated with the Council, decided it was in their interest to send delegates to meetings.

- 1910 Joseph Coles Kirby
- 1911 M. L. Murphy
- 1912 James E. Thomas, pastor of the Grote Street church; also Victoria, Western Australia.

Council was reorganised, details yet to find

- 1913 Dr George Davidson

Port Pirie Council of Churches was founded 1914

- 1914 T. B. Robson
- 1915 George Hall

1916 the Baptist Union withdrew from the Council of Churches

- 1917 J. Ernest James

F. W. Norwood appointed secretary Council was reorganised to have four members each from each of Methodist, Presbyterian. Congregation, Baptist, Churches of Christ, Salvation Army, and Society of Friends; two from each to continue in following year.

- 1918 Donald McNicol

Leslie W. Baker elected secretary

- 1919 John Alfred Seymour

J. E. Cresswell sec. 1919–1922 or later

- 1920 T. Gettes White
- 1921 Thomas Hagger (Church of Christ) left for WA
- 1922 G. Rayner
- 1923 J. A. Seymour; left for Canada
- 1923 Corley Butler
- 1924 T. Vigis
- 1925 E. M. Hall
- 1926 J. R. Wilton

F. G. Harvey secretary

- 1929 A. C. Weber

E. J. Stacy secretary

- 1932 W. Hawke (Note: Rev. William Hawke (1871–1946) was born at Kapunda, son of William Hawke of Cornish ancestry and educated at Kapunda, Willowie and Prince Alfred College. He was Congregational minister at Bordertown, Medindie, Henley Beach, Salisbury and Glenelg.)
- 1933 S. Carroll Myers
- 1934 H. R. Taylor He pleaded with airman C. J. Melrose not to make his triumphant return on a Sunday.

B. E. C. Tuck secretary

- 1936 A. C. Stevens
- 1937 Gordon Rowe
- 1938 James Anderson
- 1941 A. Bungey

Theo Edwards, secretary

- 1945 C. J. Brimlecombe refrained from criticising use of atomic bomb.
- 1946 J. E. Shipway

E. H. Woollacott secretary

- 1948 Edward S. Kiek

J. E. Shepherd secretary 1948–1950

- 1949 E. H. Woollacott
- 1941 A Bungey
- 1945 L. J. Schmidt
- 1950 Brig. F. L. Inglis
- 1951
- 1952
- 1953 A. Muriel

W. G. Clarke was elected secretary

== See also ==
Notable delegates not mentioned above

- Edward Lucas (Australian politician)
- Jeffrey Driver
- George Taplin

John Raymond Wilton
