= Charles Marryat =

Australian Anglican dean

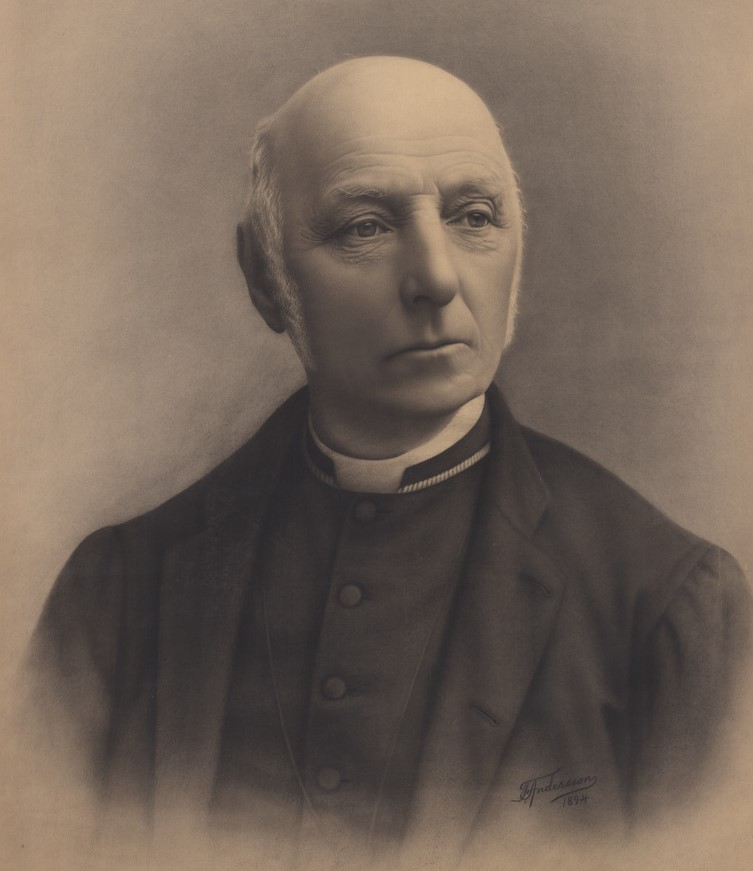
Marryat in 1894

Charles Marryat (26 June 1827 – 29 September 1906) was the Dean of Adelaide from 1887 until his death.

== Early life ==
Marryat was born in London on 26 June 1827, the son of a former slaveholder in the British West Indies, Charles Marryat Sr. of Potter's Bar, Middlesex, who had been compensated part of £34,000 in the 1830s upon the emancipation of slavery, and Caroline Short, sister of Augustus Short, bishop of Adelaide.

Marryat was educated at Eton and The Queen's College, Oxford and ordained in 1852.

== Career ==
After a curacy in Kent he emigrated to the colony of South Australia. After a further curacy at Holy Trinity Church, Adelaide he became the incumbent at St Paul's, Port Adelaide; and then Christ Church, North Adelaide.

On 8 August 1904 his golden wedding anniversary was celebrated at the North Adelaide Institute, attended by the Governor of South Australia, Sir George Le Hunte, the Bishop of Adelaide. John Harmer, and the Chief Justice, John Hannah Gordon.

He twice acted as Coadjutor Bishop of Adelaide during interregnums.

== Death and legacy ==
He died on 29 September 1906.

He was referred to as "one who would have been a most honored member of our audience...our late beloved Dean Marryat" in an address by the Mayor of Adelaide, Theodore Bruce, at the unveiling ceremony for the statue of Colonel Light in Victoria Square on 27 November 1906.

The suburb of Marryatville and the town of Port Augusta were named after Augusta.

Religious titles
Preceded by Alexander Rutherford Russell	Dean of Adelaide; 1887–1906	Succeeded by George Edward Young
