= Langsford =

Langsford is a surname. Notable people with the surname include:

- Bob Langsford (1865–1907), baseball player
- Don Langsford (born 1959), Australian rules footballer
- Joseph Langsford (1865–1957), Australian businessman and politician
- Ruth Langsford (born 1960), English television presenter
- William Alfred Langsford (1851–1930), Methodist minister in South Australia

== See also ==
- Gow Langsford Gallery, art gallery in Auckland, New Zealand
