= John Gooden =

Australian physicist (1920–1950)

John Stanley Gooden
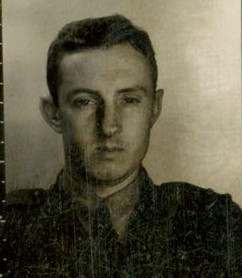
- 1941 Australian Army ID photo
- Born: 11 April 1920; Adelaide, South Australia
- Died: 9 June 1950 (aged 30); Adelaide, South Australia
- Education: University of Adelaide; University of Birmingham
- Scientific career
- Thesis: The Proton Synchrotron (1948)
- Doctoral advisor: Mark Oliphant
- Military career
- Branch: Australian Army Ordnance Corps
- Service years: 1942–1943
- Rank: Lieutenant
- Service number: S42308

John Stanley Gooden (11 April 1920 – 9 June 1950) was an Australian physicist. A 1941 graduate of the University of Adelaide, he served during the Second World War in the Australian Army and with the Council for Scientific and Industrial Research's Radiophysics Laboratory at the University of Sydney, where he was involved in the development of radar and the design of a linear particle accelerator. After the war he joined Mark Oliphant at the University of Birmingham, where he worked on the proton synchrotron.

== Early life and education ==
John Stanley Gooden was born in Adelaide, South Australia, on 11 April 1920, the oldest son of Frank Taylor Gooden and his wife Ettie née Atkin. He had an older brother, Raymond Frank, and a sister, Margaret Patricia. He was educated at Pulteney Grammar School and later St Peter's College in Adelaide, after winning a scholarship to there. He entered the University of Adelaide in 1938 and won the David Maurray scholarship in 1940, majoring in physics. He played on the university lacrosse and cricket teams, and was a lightweight boxer. He was among a group of students who threw Max Harris into the River Torrens. He wrote his honours thesis on the detection of ultra-short radio waves, an important means of communication at the time. He also worked with John Raymond Wilton on a paper on functions of a complex variable and on three papers with Hans Schwerdtfeger on mechanics and matrix calculus. He graduated with his Bachelor of Science degree with first class honours in November 1941.

== Second World War ==
While at the University of Adelaide, Gooden was called up for national service due to the Second World War on 8 November 1940, but his enlistment was deferred until after graduation. He was called to active duty on 6 February 1942, with the service number S42308. He was immediately promoted to corporal and then staff sergeant in the Australian Army Ordnance Corps before being commissioned as a lieutenant on 14 May, and was assigned to the Eastern Command Ordnance Workshops in Sydney. On 29 August, he married Claire Ward, the daughter of J.F. Ward, the headmaster of Prince Alfred College in Adelaide, in a ceremony at the Wesley College chapel at the University of Sydney officiated by Reverend Leslie Bennett, the master of the college. They had one child, a son. Gooden was admitted to the 113th General Hospital for renal investigation on 6 November 1942 and discharged on 25 November. He was diagnosed with chronic nephritis and discharged from the Army on medical grounds. He was placed on the retired list on 7 December.

Gooden then joined the Council for Scientific and Industrial Research's Radiophysics Laboratory at the University of Sydney, where he worked under Joseph L. Pawsey in examining the factors involved in producing ultra-short-wave radio transmission using a high-powered cavity magnetron. Although this had already been studied overseas, little information was available in Australia. Gooden was given a Type 271 radar to study. A 10 cm radar unit was constructed by the Radiophysics Laboratory based on its CV56 cavity magnetron and was used to equip Royal Australian Navy ships. The work formed the basis of his Master of Science thesis. He was awarded the degree by the University of Adelaide in December 1945. In early 1945, Edward George "Taffy" Bowen asked Gooden to design a low-voltage linear particle accelerator. By April, the design had progressed to the point where Bowen decided to build it. When the accelerator ran in September 1945, it produced an output of 1 million electronvolts (1 Mev).

== Post-war ==
On 14 March 1945, Gooden wrote to Mark Oliphant at the University of Birmingham in England asking if he could be admitted to study there. Oliphant offered him a three-year Nuffield Research Fellowship to work on his doctorate. Bowen wrote letters of introduction for Gooden to Robert Watson-Watt and Edward Appleton in which he described Gooden as "one of the best young physicists to have come out of Australia during the war". Accompanied by his wife Claire, Gooden left for the UK on the troopship RMMV Stirling Castle on 14 November. The project that Oliphant set Gooden to work on was the design of a 1 Gev proton synchrotron. Edwin McMillan (in the United States) and Vladimir Veksler (in the Soviet Union) had independently come up with the concept, but Oliphant went one better than them by proceeding to actually build one. The proton synchrotron design formed the basis of Gooden' Doctor of Philosophy (PhD) thesis.

That year, the Birmingham team published two papers on the on it, and Oliphant sent Gooden and John H. Fremlin to the United States to see the progress of work on accelerators there. They arrived at the Radiation Laboratory at the University of California, Berkeley, on 3 November, and were shown the 184-inch (470 cm) cyclotron. In turn, they briefed Ernest Lawrence, Edwin McMillan and Robert Serber on their work in Birmingham. Returning eastward, they met with Robert R. Wilson at Cornell University and toured the General Electric Research Laboratory at Schenectady, where they had a 70 Mev synchrotron in operation. Finally, they met with M. Stanley Livingston and Richard Q. Twiss at the Brookhaven National Laboratory, where they received input on their design. The development of the synchrotron had prompted Livingston to drop his plans to build a cyclotron and to build a synchrotron instead.

Gooden's PhD was conferred on him by Anthony Eden, the Chancellor of the University of Birmingham, on 3 July 1948. On 3 August, he accepted an offer of a research stipend of a £750 (equivalent to AUD$104,000 in 2022) at the new Australian National University (ANU) in Canberra, where Oliphant had also accepted a position. Although the Birmingham proton synchrotron had priority, Oliphant wanted Gooden to make a start on the design of a proton accelerator for the ANU. That building one in Australia would be even more difficult than the construction of the Birmingham accelerator in the scarcities of post-war Britain was not overlooked; to work around this, Oliphant proposed to use a cyclotron to accelerate protons to around 250 Mev and then feed them into a synchrotron. Gooden counter-proposed building a 500 Mev synchrotron that could be built in 12 to 18 months for £20,000 (equivalent to AUD$3,000,000 in 2022) but Oliphant rejected the idea. But with the Bevatron under construction at Berkeley planned to produce 3 Gev and the Cosmotron at Brookhaven projected to produce 6 Gev, it seemed likely that Oliphant's cyclosynchrotron would be obsolete before it was built.

== Death ==
By Match 1950, Gooden was showing signs of being increasingly unwell. The mercury used in the Birmingham proton synchrotron may have aggravated his nephritis. In May Gooden, his wife Claire and his young son were flown back to Australia at the ANU's expense. Gooden died at Wakefield Street Private Hospital in Adelaide on 9 June 1950. He was buried in Mitcham Anglican Cemetery.
