= Anne Syrett Green =

Australian welfare worker and evangelist (1858–1936)

Anne Syrett Green (2 December 1858–14 April 1936) was an Australian welfare worker and evangelist. She was the first woman superintendent of the Adelaide City Mission.

== Early life and education ==
Green was born on 2 December 1858 in Brunswick, Melbourne, the sixth child of butcher Henry Green and his wife Emma Syrett. She attended the Presbyterian Common School and her family were part of Brunswick Baptist Church. They moved to South Australia in 1877.

== Career ==
Green began volunteering with the Adelaide City Mission, before being appointed staff in 1881. She began a nightly rescue work for prostitutes, a "flower mission" at the Adelaide Hospital, and a Dorcas society with clothes for the poor. She was given oversight of the whole mission in 1887, with twelve women volunteers. She also worked for the Young Women's Christian Association for a brief period. She was also a travelling evangelist.

In 1897, Green started a branch of the Adelaide City Mission in then working-class North Adelaide, with sporting clubs for boys and girls and mothers' meetings. She also held evangelistic services and taught Bible classes. In 1905, she presented a paper to the first interstate conference of city missions, which was well received, although she later claimed it had been written by a male colleague and she just read it.

Green resigned from the Mission a number of times between 1887 and 1917, calling the formal supervision of the male superintendent "dictatorship", but was persuaded to return each time. She was paid a minimal salary for many years, and only after women joined the organisation's committee was her wage raised to that equivalent to a female factory worker. In February 1916, Green was appointed a Justice of the Peace, seven months after the South Australian government allowed women to be appointed to the role.

In 1921, the mission was unable to find a male superintendent and so instead responsibility for its operations was given to the Salvation Army. Green's supporters protested, and she was appointed superintendent of the entire mission in 1923, offering various welfare services in Light Square and turning the North Adelaide site into a hostel for Aboriginal women and children. Although the role of superintendent did not change with a woman at the helm, it was "reconceptualised" as one of caring rather than managing.

During the Great Depression, South Australian Premier Richard Layton Butler approached Green to assist with accommodation for homeless men and she oversaw extensive relief work, running some of the Welfare Department's services for a time. However, from 1930 she refused government work as she felt it compromised the mission's independence. In 1928, she created controversy for remarks that while there were 4,000 unemployed "honest men" in Adelaide, another 1,000 were "making capital out of the sympathy of men, and more particularly of women." About 500 men marched to the Mission demanding an apology. Green asked them to join the 3 p.m. service, where she said she was not prepared to withdraw one word and stood by all she had said.

== Death ==
Green died on 14 April 1936 at her home in Kingswood and is buried in the Mitcham Cemetery.
