= Ralph Drummond =

Ralph Drummond (1792 – 26 April 1872) was the first minister of a Presbyterian Church in South Australia.

== Life ==
Drummond was born in Stirling, Scotland and studied literature at Glasgow University and theology under George Lawson at the Divinity Hall in Selkirk. He was ordained as a minister in August 1821 at the Baptist Secession Church in Crail, Fifeshire, where he was held in high esteem.

In 1838 he was called to serve the United Presbyterian Church in South Australia, and with his wife Elizabeth and their eight children arrived in the colony aboard Sir Charles Forbes in June 1839. He founded the "Classical and English School" on Angas Street near Victoria Square, and preached to a small congregation in the schoolroom.

On 30 November 1840 he laid the foundation stone of the new United Presbyterian church building on Gouger Street, near Victoria Square, and on 27 February 1842 he preached his first sermon there, the first Presbyterian Church in the colony.

He travelled extensively to the Finniss, Strathalbyn, and Mount Barker districts, visiting church members.

In 1851 some differences arose which badly affected attendance in the church.

Around 1854 he met with a very serious accident by which his leg was broken, his arm injured, and was forced to suspend his ministerial duties for six or seven months. Drummond never fully recovered and tendered his resignation in 1855, whereon Rev. Peter Mercer of Drymen, Stirlingshire, was inducted as his colleague on 15 July 1855 with a view to taking over the church, but only remained some six months, having grounds for dissatisfaction that were never clearly stated. On 23 July 1857 Drummond was presented by his congregation with a purse of 300 sovereigns recognising his 17 years of service, and significantly "as a mark of their sympathy with him in the trials and privations he has been called on to endure". His replacement Rev. James Lyall took his first service on 27 September 1857.

Drummomd remained active in the church, and was instrumental in the union of the three Presbyterian churches in Adelaide. He was accorded the honor of laying the foundation-stone for the Flinders Street Presbyterian Church in 1864. He occasionally took services, particularly at Golden Grove until around 1870 he was forced by feebleness and rheumatism to remain at home in Mitcham. In August 1871 he was accorded a reception to celebrate the 50th jubilee of his arrival in the colony. He died at home, clear-minded and coherent to the last, in 1872. His remains were buried in the West Terrace Cemetery.

== Family ==
Ralph Drummond (c. 1792 – 26 April 1872) married Elizabeth Murray (c. 1797 – 12 August 1875). Their children were:

- Katherine Drummond ( – 31 December 1905)
- Thomas Drummond ( – 12 February 1887) married Jessie Tyrie ( – ) in 1855

- Ralph Drummond (c. 1856 – 18 August 1934)
- Annie Drummond ( – 6 April 1900)

- Elizabeth Drummond ( – 15 April 1911)
- Robert Drummond ( – 21 June 1903) married Eliza Spender ( – ) in 1858
- John Drummond (c. 1833 – 7 September 1894) married Jane Vince ( – ) in 1861, lived at Echuca

- Katharine Adelaide Drummond ( – 16 March 1937)
- Elizabeth Emma Drummond ( – 12 December 1937) married ?? Williamson ( – )
- Ralph Murray Drummond ( – 16 March 1937)
- Florence Alberta Drummond ( – 1 June 1944)

- Charles Drummond ( – 12 February 1913) married Achsah Mary Dalwood ( – ) on 20 September 1864. He was with Education Department.

- Rev. Frank Charles Drummond (c. 1875 – September 1903)
- Amy Drummond ( – 8 August 1905) married James May Simpson ( – ) on 13 June 1888

- Ralph Drummond ( – ) (d aft arr)
- Helen Drummond ( – 30 October 1920) married John Augustus Bagshaw ( – ) on 24 May 1869
- Mary Drummond (c. 1840 – 12 July 1921) was City Missionary
- Margaret Drummond (c. 1843 – 28 July 1922)

== Presbyterian denominations of early Adelaide ==
- United Secession Church officially became United Presbyterian Church in 1847

Ministers: Ralph Drummond 1839 to 1857; Peter Mercer (probationary) 1855 to 1856; James Lyall 1857 to 1897; George Davidson 1898 to 1928
Buildings: Angas Street schoolroom, near Victoria Square (1839–1842); Gouger Street, near Victoria Square (1842–1864); Flinders Street (1864–1956) demolished 1957.

- Established Church of Scotland

Ministers: Robert Haining 1841 to 1871; James Henderson 1871 to 1881 (deposed)
Buildings: St. Andrew's Presbyterian Church on Grenfell Street (1844– ); St. Andrew's Presbyterian Church on Wakefield Street (1859– )

- Free Church of Scotland

Ministers: John Gardner 1850 to 1868; James Davidson 1870 to 1876
Building: Chalmers Church (now Scots Church) on North Terrace (1851 – present)

A deed of union of the three branches of the Presbyterian Churches was signed in Adelaide on 10 May 1865 by John Gardner (Chalmers Church), Robert Haining (St. Andrew's, Wakefield Street), John Anderson (Strathalbyn), James Gordon (Gawler), James Lyall (Flinders Street), W. Davidson (Clare), Alexander Law (Mount Barker), and James Moddich (Mount Pleasant)
