= Marjorie Hann =

Australian artist and teacher

Marjorie Helen Hann OAM, FRSASA (23 February 1916 – 29 June 2011) was an Australian artist and art teacher.

== History ==
Marjorie was born in 1916 the only daughter of William James Fisher and Mary Marguerita Fisher, née Bath, of Brougham Place, Alberton. She was educated at Presbyterian Girls' College, where she studied art with Maude Priest. She joined the Royal South Australian Society of Arts as an Associate at age 15, and in the early 1930s studied oil painting under Leslie Wilkie, Gladys K. Good (Note: Gladys Katheen Good (4 August 1890 – 1979), was born at New Glenelg, a daughter of Samuel Good. She was educated at Tormore House School, whose art teacher was Mary Overbury.) and Ivor Hele at the South Australian School of Arts and Crafts in the Exhibition Building on North Terrace. Leaving school, she worked as a commercial artist for several companies before landing a full-time position with Waterman Brothers, home furnishers of Port Road, Kilkenny, which largely entailed designing and executing showcards and other advertising work. She was active in amateur theatricals: acting, writing and set and costume design for the Playbox Theatre. She co-wrote a musical comedy "His Royal Highness" in 1938.

During World War II, she left Watermans to work at the Holden factory in Woodville, working on technical drawings and instruction documents as part of the "war effort". This put a great strain on her mentally, and she did not look on this period with any feelings of nostalgia.

=== Cartooning ===
After the war Marjorie illustrated a series of books for children by Kathleen M. Mellor MBE, the first Director of the Lady Gowrie Child Centre. These were a book on safety entitled "Stop, Look, Listen", and another pair entitled Now I'm Ready and Let's Go to the Beach. In 1947 radio personality Bob Fricker created a comic character "Charlie Cheesecake", (Note: The name had been used in the early 1940s by an Australian "blue" vaudeville team for an entirely different character, "Charlie Cheesecake, the Minister for Misinformation".) a boy who was always getting into trouble, for his breakfast programme on 5AD and, with help from Arthur Askey, on recordings for the National Safety Council. He was approached by the Child Safety Council of SA to write and illustrate a similar booklet of "cautionary tale" poems, in collaboration with advertising executive Lloyd A. Wilson (1898–1961). The Adventures of Charlie Cheesecake was published around 1950. Two illustrations, drawn in comic strip style, were given for each episode, the somewhat gruesome "after" being revealed by lifting a flap. A follow-up, The Return of Charlie Cheesecake, was published many years later, sponsored by Geo. Hall & Sons and Radio 5AD.

She wrote and illustrated a serious comic strip adaptation of Thackeray's The Rose and the Ring which was serialized in 82 episodes and syndicated throughout Australia.

=== Writing and art criticism ===
Marjorie had demonstrated her ability to write for newspapers in a variety of assignments. After contributing the winning essay for a contest "What I hate about housework", she was given a column "Every Woman's Family", which she wrote (as "Helen") for the Adelaide News and the Melbourne Argus, or/then the Sunday Advertiser for many years.

She was asked by the Messenger Press to write a regular column on regional art exhibitions for their free suburban newspapers. She filled the role for four years, during which time she attended classes on the History of Art. She acted as judge for the art division of the Royal Adelaide Show for eleven years.

She wrote and illustrated several historical articles for The Advertiser.

=== Teaching ===
She taught landscape and portrait painting and art appreciation classes at the Workers' Educational Association for 16 years, and life classes at the Kensington and Norwood Colleges of TAFE for four years. She conducted many art classes in country regions throughout South Australia, in Mildura, New South Wales, and in Nambour, Queensland.

In 1973 she instigated tutorials for artists, with ten established South Australian practitioners leading the classes. She coordinated the programme, in conjunction with the Royal South Australian Society of Arts, for nine years.

=== Painting ===
She has always painted in a realistic style directly from nature, from live models and subjects sitting for commissioned portraits, or en plein aire. She has worked in pastels and oils, but her favorite medium has always been watercolors. She acknowledged Gladys Goode, Ivor Hele and John C. Goodchild as her chief influences.

She had two six-month painting trips to the United Kingdom, in 1976 and 1979, each followed by a highly successful solo exhibition at the gallery of the Royal South Australian Society of Arts, and a solo exhibition at the Adelaide Art Society in 2009.

She had a long association with the Lombard Art Gallery of North Adelaide and Stepney, including six Adelaide Fringe Festival Exhibitions. She also exhibited regularly at the Pepper Street Gallery in Magill, and at various Adelaide Art Society functions.

== Family ==
She married Sergeant George Adrian Hann (4 April 1916 – 1991) of the RAAF sometime around 1945. He was a son of George Hann (1869–1933) and his second wife Mabel Hann née Hoffman of Kooringa, South Australia.

George and Marjorie had a home at 10 Taylor Terrace, Rosslyn Park. Their children include sons born in July 1947 and on 23 September 1951, and a daughter on 14 June 1949.

Hann died on 29 June 2011 at age 95.

== Recognition ==
- Marjorie Hann was awarded the Order of Australia Medal for Service to the Arts in 1988.

She was made an Honorary Life Member of the

- Royal South Australian Society of Arts
- Adelaide Art Society
- Burnside Painting Group
- PGC / Seymour College Old Collegian’s Association

The Lombard Gallery mounted a retrospective exhibition at the Festival Fringe in 2010.

== Bibliography ==
- Corripane and Other Wogs (c. 1938) unpublished book for children.
- Mellor, Kathleen; Hann, Marjorie (1947), Let's go to the beach, Georgian House
- Mellor, Kathleen; Hann, Marjorie (1947), Now I'm ready, Georgian House
- Hann, Marjorie; Wilson, Lloyd A. (1950), The Adventures of Charlie Cheesecake, Child Safety Production
- Hann, Marjorie (c. 1962), The Return of Charlie Cheesecake, Griffin Press, Adelaide
- Art instruction videos by Marjorie Hann and Marguerite Hann Syme (VHS and DVD formats):

- Visual Perspective
- Landscape in Watercolour
- Figures and Flowers
- Portraiture in Pastels and Watercolour
