= John Alfred Seymour =

John Alfred Seymour (16 June 1881 – 14 February 1934), variously referred to as Rev. Dr Seymour or J. Alfred Seymour, was a Presbyterian minister in Adelaide, South Australia, born and educated in Ontario, Canada, where he also died.

== History ==
Seymour was born at Mountain, Ontario, son of John Wesley Seymour and Hope Seymour, née Milward. He was educated at a Methodist College in Ontario, where in 1906 he was ordained as a Methodist minister, and a few years later took up studies at Yale University, graduating B.D. in 1909 and M.A. in 1911.

In 1912 Seymour, his Australian-born wife and son emigrated to Melbourne, Australia, where he took charge of a newly-built Presbyterian church in Murrumbeena, then in 1916 left for Adelaide, where he took charge of Scots Church (later Chalmers Church). He served in World War I as camp chaplain in Adelaide, and was elected moderator of the Church's General Assembly in 1918. Perhaps through also having close ties with the Methodist church, Seymour was a force for inter-church collegiality. He opened the way for ministerial candidates of other denominations to be trained at (the Congregational) Parkin Theological College, and was closely identified with the Council of Churches in South Australia serving as its president in 1919 and part of 1923.

He also worked for education in South Australia, being largely credited with the establishment of Scotch College in 1919 and in 1922 the Presbyterian Girls' College, of whose council he served as chairman.

In 1928 he resigned from Chalmers Church to take a position as pastor of St Andrews Presbyterian Church at Belleville, Ontario. He died after being struck by a street car (tram) in Toronto.

== Recognition ==
Seymour College, previously Presbyterian Girls' College, was renamed in his honour.

== Family ==
Seymour married Elsie Liddelow at New Haven, Connecticut, on 16 June 1909. Elsie was the youngest daughter of Arthur Liddelow, of "Colney ", Dandenong Road, East Malvern, Victoria. They had one son:

- Stanley Liddelow Seymour (14 November 1910 – 25 October 1942) was a surgeon in Adelaide, enlisted with the 2nd AIF, served as Major Seymour with the 2/8 Field Ambulance, was killed in action in Egypt.
