= Seymour College =

School for girls in Adelaide, Australia

Coordinates: 34°57′23″S 138°38′53″E

- Glen Osmond, South Australia; Australia

Information
- Type: Independent, single-sex, day & boarding
- Motto: Latin: Crescam Ministrando (I will grow by serving)
- Denomination: Uniting Church previously Presbyterian Church of Australia
- Established: 1922
- Principal: Vanessa Browning
- Staff: ~100
- Enrolment: ~850 (P–13)
- Colours: Green, navy & purple
- Affiliation: Independent Girls Schools Sports Association
- Previously known as: Presbyterian Girls' College
- Website: https://www.seymour.sa.edu.au/

Seymour College is an independent, Uniting Church, day and boarding school for girls, located at Glen Osmond, Adelaide, South Australia.

Established in 1922 as Presbyterian Girls' College, and renamed for the Rev. J. A. Seymour, Seymour has a non-selective enrolment policy and currently caters for students from preschool (4 years of age) to Year 12, including 105 boarders. In addition, The Early Years at Seymour offers a co-educational program for children from 6 weeks of age. The College is girls only from Prep (4 years of age) to Year 12.

The College is affiliated with the Alliance of Girls' Schools Australasia (AGSA), the Independent Primary School Heads of Australia (IPSHA), the Association of Heads of Independent Schools of Australia, (AHISA), the Australian Boarding Schools' Association, (ABSA) and the Uniting Church in Australia.

== Service ==
Crescam Ministrando, I grow by serving, has been the College's motto and guiding philosophy since the College's foundation in 1922. Service Learning is embedded in the curriculum from Reception to Year 12 and the whole-school approach is centred around ‘Justice’ for people and the world in which they live.

== Campus ==
Seymour College is situated on a single 10 hectare campus, located 5 km southeast of the Adelaide city centre, in the Adelaide foothills. The campus is a blend of both old and new buildings. Some of the college's notable older buildings include the historic "Barr Smith House" (formerly the "Wooton Lea" mansion), the bluestone and brick former laundry, stables and cottages, pump house, and the former coach-house turned music room. Other facilities include: two theatres, a Sports Centre including facilities for indoor basketball, netball, tennis, badminton, weights training and exercise, a science centre, two libraries, swimming pool, an oval for athletics, softball, soccer, and hockey, and a Boarding House including dining hall and health centre.

== House system ==
As with most Australian schools, Seymour College uses a house system; however, it is unique in that it is referred to as a "Clan" system.

== Sport ==
Seymour College is a member of the Independent Girls Schools Sports Association (IGSSA).

=== IGSSA premierships ===
Seymour College has won the following IGSSA premierships.

- Athletics (2) – 2000, 2002
- Badminton (4) – 1994, 1998, 1999, 2007
- Basketball (2) – 2012, 2014
- Hockey (15) – 1987, 1997, 1999, 2000, 2001, 2002, 2004, 2007, 2008, 2009, 2010, 2011, 2012, 2013, 2018
- Netball – 2003
- Soccer (3) – 1999, 2002, 2004
- Swimming (2) – 2013, 2018
- Tennis (7) – 1995, 1998, 2004, 2022, 2023, 2024, 2025
- Volleyball (7) – 1999, 2002, 2008, 2009, 2010, 2011, 2012

== Notable alumni ==
Alumnae of Seymour College/Presbyterian Girls' College are known as Old Collegians and may elect to join the schools alumni association, the Old Collegians' Association.

=== Rhodes Scholars ===
Since Rhodes Scholarships were first awarded to South Australian women in 1980, three have been awarded to Seymour Old Collegians:

- 1988 Kathryn Brown
- 1997 Elizabeth Wall
- 2004 Rachel Swift
- 2026 Jessica March

Some notable Old Collegians include:

=== Academia ===
- Peggy Brock - historian and writer
- Jenny Graves – professor of the Research School of Biological Sciences at the Australian National University; Director of the Australian Research Council Centre for Kangaroo Genomics; Recipient of the Centenary Medal 2003
- Linley Martin – Commissioner of Tertiary Education Quality and Standards Agency, vice-president (Academic and Information Services) and Council Secretary of Deakin University
- Janice Reid AC – Vice-Chancellor and University President at the University of Western Sydney; Recipient of the Centenary Medal 2003
- Judith Roberts AO – Deputy Chancellor of Flinders University; Trained Nurse/Voluntary Community Worker; Former President of The Cancer Council Australia, and the Family Services Council Aust; Foundation Chair of the Helpmann Academy Board; Former President of Relationships Australia; Former Director of the Office for the Ageing SA Government
- Christina Slade – Conjoint Dean of Arts and Social Sciences at City University London; Professor of Media Theory at the Universiteit Utrecht Netherlands
- Claire Woods – Professor of Communication and Writing at the University of South Australia; Recipient of the Max Harris Literary Award 2002; (also attended Rumson-Fair Haven Regional High School)

=== Entertainment, media and the arts ===
- Elizabeth Cameron Dalman - choreographer, teacher, and performer
- Jo Dyer - film producer
- Marjorie Hann - artist and art teacher
- Deborah Humble – opera singer
- Helen Leake – CEO of the South Australian Film Corporation (2004–07), Company Director/Producer of Duo Art Productions (1996–2004)
- Ruby Litchfield - theatre director
- Mandy Martin - painter and printmaker
- Georgina McGuinness – weekend news presenter for National Nine News Adelaide
- Poh Ling Yeow – runner-up in Masterchef Australia
- Olivia Rogers – Miss Universe Australia 2017

=== Medicine and science ===
- Di Davidson - agricultural scientist and author
- Freda Evelyn Gibson OBE – Pioneering Flying Doctor
- Rhodanthe Lipsett OAM – Midwife and author

=== Politics, public service and the law ===
- Justice Catherine Branson – Judge of the Federal Court of Australia
- Mary Downer - wife of federal MP and high commissioner Sir Alexander "Alick" Downer, and mother of former Liberal Party leader Alexander Downer
- Carolyn Hewson (née Somerville) – Company Director; Director of AGL Energy Ltd, and Westpac Banking Corp.
- Diana Laidlaw AM – Vigneron; MLC for South Australia (1982–2003), SA Minister for Transport and Urban Planning (1997–2002), The Arts (1993–2002), the Status of Women (1993–2002), (Transport) 1993–97; SA Shadow Minister for Transport, Marine, Arts and Cultural Heritage, Status of Women, Local Govt Relations (1992–93), Tourism (1986–93)
- Louise Miller-Frost - politician
- Susan Tanner – Australian Ambassador to Spain and Andorra (2003–06), Assistant Secretary Europe Br. DFAT (2000–02), Australian Ambassador to Chile, Bolivia and Peru (1997–99)

=== Sport ===
- Isobel Batt-Doyle - long distance runner
- Kimberley Wells – Professional Cyclist and Australian National Criterium Champion 2013 & 2015 (Australian National Criterium Championships)

== Notable staff ==
- Phyllis Duguid OAM (1904–1993), née Lade – English teacher and Aboriginal rights and women's activist
- Elizabeth Mitchell - fencer

== See also ==
- List of schools in South Australia
- List of boarding schools
