= Martin Luther Murphy =

Australian Baptist minister (1875–1969)

Martin Luther Palmer Murphy (1875–1969), generally referred to as Rev. M. L. Murphy, was a Baptist minister in Victoria and South Australia.

== History ==
Murphy was born in Plumstead, Kent, a son of William John Murphy (died 20 October 1905) and Maria Brooks Murphy (c. 1852 – 16 September 1903). W. J. Murphy was founder and pastor of the East Plumstead Baptist Tabernacle. (Note: He revisited Plumstead in 1904, and J. E. Smith published a booklet (1904), H. Pryce & Son, A brief history of the East Plumstead Baptist Church, issued in conjunction with the visit to England of W. J. Murphy, founder of the church.) His wife was, in her younger days, an evangelist associate of William Booth.

In 1887[?] (Note: Darling Downs did not sail to Australia in 1887, but on 15 July 1886 she left London docks with cargo in her holds and 69 passengers in her poop, and after a particularly rough voyage of 85 days arrived at Hobson's Bay on 7 October. She left Melbourne railway docks on 29 January 1887, arrived at the English Channel on 11 May but before entering the Thames, struck the ship Britannia and sank at the Nore, with her cargo of 7725 bales of wool.) the family sailed to Australia aboard the iron clipper ship Darling Downs and at some later date his father became headmaster of the State school, Ross, Tasmania. Murphy, who had a religious awakening at age 10, was by 18 preaching regularly.

=== Victoria ===
Sometime around 1895 he moved to Melbourne spending two and a half years (c. 1895–1897) in the Victorian Home Mission, followed by four years (1898–1901) at the Victorian Baptist Theological College. On 20 November 1898, as part of his college experience, he conducted a service at the Clark Street Baptist Church. and the following year at Canterbury Baptist Church on the occasion of its anniversary.

In July 1900 he was tasked, as a student of Baptist Theological College, with establishing a church at Box Hill, Victoria. He was ordained in January 1902 and preached the first sermon in the newly opened church.

=== South Australia ===
He left Box Hill in July 1909 to take charge of the Baptist church at Alberton, South Australia. He was a supporter of ecumenism, and in 1911 was elected president of the Council of Churches in South Australia after the incumbent, W. S. Rollings, resigned from the council, and in 1913 accepted a call from a church in Ponsonby, New Zealand.

Murphy resigned the Alberton pastorate in October 1915, to be succeeded by Rev. D. Davis. He spent some time in England, preaching in some of London's great Baptist churches, including Westbourne Park chapel, of which Dr Clifford was a noted pastor, and the Rye Lane chapel, Peckham, where Rev. John W. Ewing MA DD had been minister for 20 years before becoming secretary of the London Baptist Association.

He never returned to South Australia; he was appointed to the Emmanuel Baptist church in Falmouth, Cornwall, later settling in Taunton, Somerset.

== Character ==
Murphy was an exponent of "muscular Christianity", defending his beliefs vigorously. He encouraged manly sports and physical fitness — the hall attached to the Alberton church was equipped with apparatus for practising gymnastics. And he was himself no slouch — he once chased and caught an intruder attempting to break into his house and, after a struggle, took him to the police station. He fought the Commonwealth Defence Act which, he said, removed from citizens the right of conscience. He displayed, however, jingoistic loyalty to Britain, following Australia's entry into WWI.

== Family ==
Murphy married Margaret Wright Cameron (1877–1951) at Box Hill on 12 May 1903 She was president of the Women's Baptist Missionary Union, Adelaide. Their children included:

- Evan Cameron Murphy (13 September 1904 – )
- Alexander Martin Cameron Murphy (1908– )

Murphy's sister Clara W. Murphy, married William S. Deane of Parkside, South Australia, on 31 March 1908.

His brother Gilbert Blackie Murphy married Elizabeth Charlotte "Bessie" Macqueen, of Parramatta, on 23 October 1914.
