= George Davidson (minister) =

George Davidson (1855 – 15 July 1936) was a Presbyterian minister in Adelaide, South Australia from 1898 to 1928.

== History ==
The Rev. Dr Davidson was born at Dundee, Scotland in 1855, the son of George Davidson, a mechanical engineer, and was educated at Dundee's West End Academy. After four years' employment at the office of a local jute factory, he enrolled at St Andrew's University in Fife, graduating MA in 1879, and prepared for the ministry at the Theological Hall of the United Presbyterian Church, Edinburgh. He would receive his Doctorate of Divinity in 1910. His first posting was to the Allars United Presbyterian Church, Hawick, where he remained for 13 years.

Davidson answered a call from the Flinders Street, Adelaide church (founded 1865) in 1897 to succeed Rev. James Lyall, and with his wife and two sons arrived in Adelaide by the liner Ormuz on 28 February 1898. and served there from 1898 to 1928. These were the two pastorates of his 44 years' ministerial career. He served as Moderator General of the Presbyterian Church of Australia from 1914 to 1916 and was three times Moderator of the South Australian Assembly.

The Flinders Street Presbyterian Church was Adelaide's first, and Chalmer's Church and St Andrew's were later offshoots. Rev. Ralph Drummond was, in 1839, Adelaide's first Presbyterian minister, at first conducting services at his home in Angas Street (also to a group at Mount Barker). A church and school were built on Gouger Street in 1841 and the stately edifice on Flinders Street in 1865. Drummond was succeeded by Rev. James Lyall in 1857, and Davidson was the third incumbent. So the church had only three ministers in a span of 90 years.

He was elected president of the Council of Churches in South Australia in 1913 and again in 1919.

The Flinders Street church was aligned with the United Presbyterian Church, one of three Presbyterian denominations in Adelaide. The others (Free Presbyterian Church and Church of Scotland) merged in 1865 to form Chalmers Church, with which the Flinders Street church joined in 1929 as Scots Church. The Flinders Street property was sold in 1956, with the funds and much of the material used to upgrade the Scots Church at the North Terrace - Pulteney Street corner.

He resigned from the South Australian Presbytery in December 1928, on account of failing health. He died at home and after a brief ceremony his remains were buried in the Mitcham Cemetery.

== Other interests ==
Davidson was an occasional bowls player and golfer. He was a teetotaler and temperance advocate.

== Family ==
Davidson's wife, Jessie Wannen Davidson (c. 1855 – 19 July 1937), was born in Arbroath; they were married in Scotland on 9 April 1884. They had two sons:

- D. M. Davidson (Sydney)
- J. L. Davidson (Melbourne).

They had a home at 22 Gurney road Dulwich, where he died.
