= Rhodanthe Lipsett =

Australian writer and midwife (1922–2019)

- Born: Rhodanthe Grace Lipsett; 21 January 1922
- Died: 17 January 2019 (aged 96)
- Occupations: Midwife and author

Dr Rhodanthe Grace Lipsett OAM (21 January 1922 – 17 January 2019) was an Australian midwife and author. Throughout her professional life she specialised in infant and maternal health.

== Early life and education ==
Lipsett's childhood was spent at Cadell, South Australia and she was educated at Presbyterian Girls College. She trained as a nurse at the Adelaide Children's Hospital, with postgraduate study at the Royal Adelaide Hospital.

== Career ==
In 1947, she began as a midwife at Broken Hill District Hospital, and later moved to Tresillian, Sydney to obtain the Infant Welfare Certificate. After spending two years in England, from 1951 Lipsett worked in Canberra at Canberra Hospital and in Maternal and Baby Health Centres. In 1971, she joined the Queen Elizabeth II Family Centre.

== Recognition ==
Lipsett was appointed of the Order of Australia in 1992 for her services to Australian women and their families.

In 1996, she was made a Fellow of the Australian College of Midwives in recognition of her work for the profession.

In 2006, the Australian College of Midwives created the Rhodanthe Lipsett Award' worth $1000 in recognition of her work, and in 2009 named their scholarship fund for Aboriginal and Torres Strait Islander women who wished to study to become midwives, the Rhodanthe Lipsett Indigenous Midwifery Trust. From this the Rhodanthe Lipsett Indigenous Midwives Charitable Fund was established as an independent charity in 2011.

The Rhodanthe Lipsett Postgraduate Midwifery Scholarship was a core element of the New South Wales NSW Aboriginal Nursing and Midwifery Strategy 2020.

== Other works ==
She published her first book, No 'One Right Way' - a handbook for parents. Nurturing your baby in the first three months of life, in 2004. An updated and revised edition of that book was released in 2012 with the new name of Baby Care: Nurturing your baby your way.

== Bibliography ==
- No 'One Right Way' - a handbook for parents. Nurturing your baby in the first three months of life, Sea Change Publishing, Sydney 2004 ISBN 0-9752494-1-X
- Baby Care: Nurturing your baby your way, Finch Publishing, Lane Cove, 2012. ISBN 978-1921462306
