= Mitcham Cemetery =

Cemetery in Mitcham, Australia

Mitcham General Cemetery, Mitcham Anglican Cemetery, St Joseph's Cemetery
- Interactive map of Mitcham General Cemetery, Mitcham Anglican Cemetery, St Joseph's Cemetery

Details
- Established: 1854
- Location: Old Belair Road, Mitcham / Blythewood Road, Mitcham & Torrens Park; South Australia
- Country: Australia
- Coordinates: 34°59′03″S 138°37′14″E
- Type: Public, Anglican, and private
- Owned by: Mitcham General Cemetery – City of Mitcham; Mitcham Anglican Cemetery – Anglican Diocese of Adelaide; St Joseph's Cemetery – Sisters of St. Joseph
- Find a Grave: Mitcham General Cemetery, Mitcham Anglican Cemetery, St Joseph's Cemetery
- Footnotes: Mitcham Anglican Cemetery at Find a Grave; Sisters of St. Joseph Cemetery – Find a Grave

Mitcham Cemetery on Old Belair Road, Mitcham, South Australia comprises three separate cemeteries: Mitcham General Cemetery, Mitcham Anglican Cemetery, and (Order of) St Joseph's Cemetery. The cemeteries are administered by the City of Mitcham, the Anglican Diocese of Adelaide and the Sisters of St. Joseph.

The cemeteries had their origins in the 22 April 1854 grant of two acres (0.81 hectares) to the Bishop of Adelaide for the burial of 'Members of the Established United Church of England and Ireland' and another two acres to three trustees for the burial of those who '...had not been members of the Church of England'.

Mitcham General Cemetery was 'established in 1854 for non conformist or "dissenting" Protestant denominations to compliment [sic] the neighbouring Church of England Cemetery.' Despite being extended on a number of occasions, new leases for burial plots are not being let, however existing leases can still be used for new burials. The first burial occurred on 3 November 1853.

Mitcham Anglican Cemetery was established in 1854; until 1953 it was controlled and maintained by members of the local parish of St Michael, and subsequently by the Diocese of Adelaide.

== Interments ==
=== Mitcham General Cemetery ===
- Sir Harry Alderman, (1895–1962) lawyer
- Ella Cleggett, (1884–1960) schoolteacher and welfare worker
- Laura Mary Louisa Corbin, (1841–1906) crèche founder
- George Davidson (1855–1936), Presbyterian minister
- Edwin Theyer Dean, (1884–1970) army officer
- George Henry Dean, (1859–1953) soldier, stock and station agent and grazier
- John Gooden, (1920–1950) physicist
- Sir David John Gordon, (1865–1946) journalist and politician
- Anne Syrett Green, (1858–1936) welfare worker and evangelist
- William Hague, (1864–1924) storekeeper and politician
- Hilda Mary Hanton, (1884–1954) hospital matron
- Kate Hill, (1859–1933) nurse
- Charles Henry Standish Hope, (1861–1942) medical practitioner
- Laura Margaret Hope, (1868–1952) medical practitioner
- Walter Howchin, (1845–1937) geologist and clergyman
- Sidney Kidman, (1857–1935) pastoralist who owned or co-owned large areas of land in Australia
- Ernest Eugene Kramer, (1889–1958) missionary
- Lydia Longmore, (1874–1967) infant-teacher
- John Pearce, (1840–1910) teamster, farmer, carrier and administrator
- Arthur William Piper, (1865–1936) judge
- Thomas Piper, (1835–1928) clergyman
- Frederick William Preece, (1857–1928) bookseller and publisher
- John Lloyd Preece, (1895–1969) bookseller and publisher
- John Lloyd Price, (1882–1941) union official, agent-general and politician
- Thomas (Tom) Price, (1852–1909) premier of SA 1905-1909 who died in office
- Robert Henry Pulleine, (1869–1935) physician and naturalist
- Herbert Clarence Richards, (1876–1949) businessman and motor-body manufacturer
- Tobias John Martin Richards, (1850–1939) manufacturer
- John Henry Sexton, (1863–1954) Baptist clergyman
- David Shearer, (1850–1936) agricultural machinery manufacturer and inventor
- John Shearer, (1845–1932) agricultural machinery manufacturer and inventor
- Alfred Depledge Sykes, (1871–1940) clergyman
- James Gilbert Woolcock, (1874–1957) mining engineer and metallurgist

=== Mitcham Anglican Cemetery ===
- Robert Barr Smith, (1824–1915) businessman and philanthropist
- Tom Elder Barr Smith, (1863–1941) pastoralist and financier
- Frederick William Coneybeer, (1859–1950) trade unionist and politician
- Daniel Michael Paul Cudmore, (1811–1891) pastoralist in the early days of South Australia
- James Davidson, (1885–1945) ecologist
- Sir Thomas Elder, (1818–1897) Scottish-Australian public figure
- Felix Gordon Giles, (1885—1950) engineer
- Walter Gooch, (1842–1918) merchant and conservationist
- Laurence Hotham Howie, (1876–1963) artist and teacher
- George Richards Laffer, (1866–1933) fruit-grower and politician
- Luther Robert Scammell
- Sir William Mitchell, (1861–1962) University of Adelaide Professor, Vice Chancellor and Chancellor, 1942–1948
- Catherine Maria Thornber (c. 1813 – 1894) founder of school for girls in Unley Park
- Alexander Tolmer, (1815–1890) police officer
- Peter Waite
- Stanley Holm Watson, (1887–1985) railway engineer and soldier
- Lawrence Allen Wells, (1860–1938) explorer
