= Anstey Giles =

Australian surgeon (1860–1944)

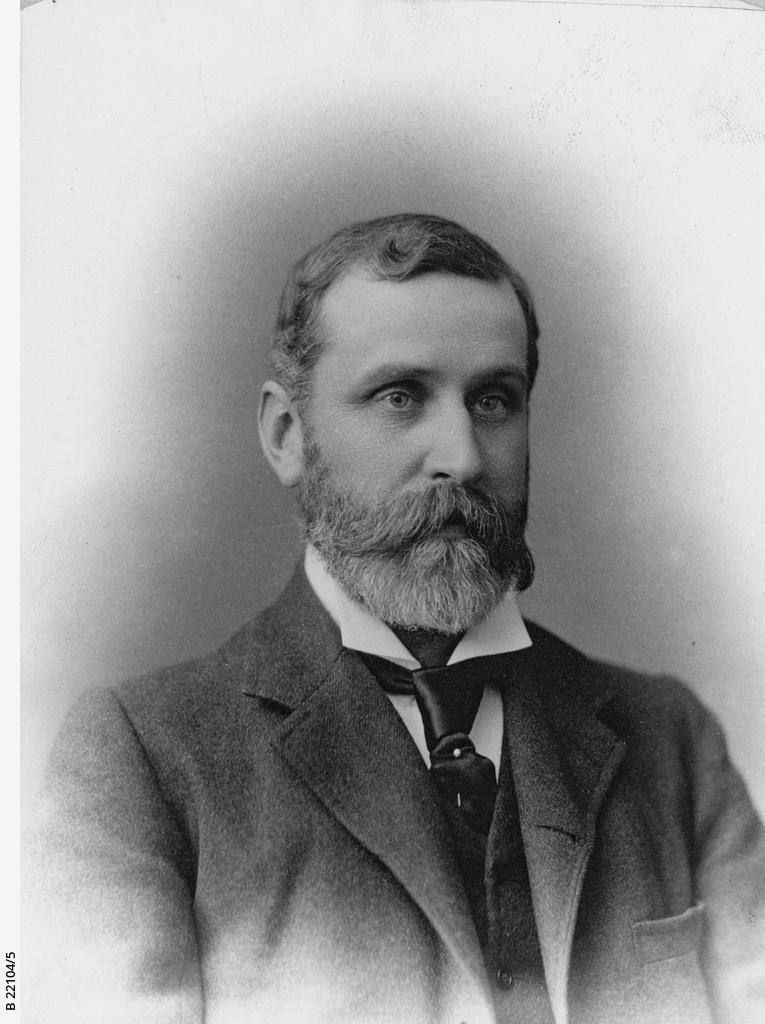
- Born: 29 June 1860
- Died: 7 May 1944 (aged 83)
- Education: Clifton College; University of Edinburgh
- Medical career
- Profession: surgeon and medical administrator
- Sub-specialties: otology

William Anstey Giles (29 June 1860 – 7 May 1944), generally known as Anstey Giles, was a surgeon and medical administrator in Adelaide, South Australia.

== Early life and education ==
Giles was born in Adelaide on 29 June 1860, the eldest son of Thomas Giles and Mary Giles (née O'Halloran). He was a grandson of William Giles, second manager of the South Australian Company. Mary was a daughter of Captain William Littlejohn O'Halloran, Auditor-General of South Australia.

Giles was educated at Clifton College in Bristol and studied medicine at the University of Edinburgh, graduating in 1882.

He then spent two years in Vienna, studying diseases of the ear, nose and throat under Dr. Ádám Politzer amongst others, returning to Adelaide in 1885. His MB degree was accepted ad eundem gradum by the University of Adelaide in 1886.

== Career ==
Giles entered into private practice with Dr. William Gardner, a partnership that was to last many years. Both doctors sent patients to and were associated with the Private Hospital, Wakefield Street, the first training hospital for nurses in the state.

He was appointed lecturer in otology by the University of Adelaide in 1886, resigning in 1905.

During his public career he served as:

- Secretary of the Medical Board 1890 to 1896
- Honorary surgeon at the Adelaide Hospital from 1891 to 1908
- Honorary surgeon of the ear department from 1891 to 1896
- Lecturer in clinical surgery from 1882 to 1896 and from 1902 to 1907
- Foundation member of the Australian College of Surgeons and the first president of the South Australian branch.
- Dean of the Faculty of Medicine at the Adelaide University in 1895 and again from 1902 to 1904
- Lecturer in clinical surgery at the Adelaide Hospital from 1892 to 1896 and from 1902 to 1907.
- He was a member of the Adelaide Hospital Board of Management, which was sacked by the Kingston Government in 1896. The hospital was riven by professional jealousies and a dysfunctional workplace, and came to a head when E. Willis Way, no friend of Kingston, was accused of nepotism for promoting his daughter Bessie to Charge Nurse.

Giles retired from most professional obligations shortly after The Great War.

== Other interests ==
- He was a foundation member of the Royal Adelaide Golf Club

== Recognition ==
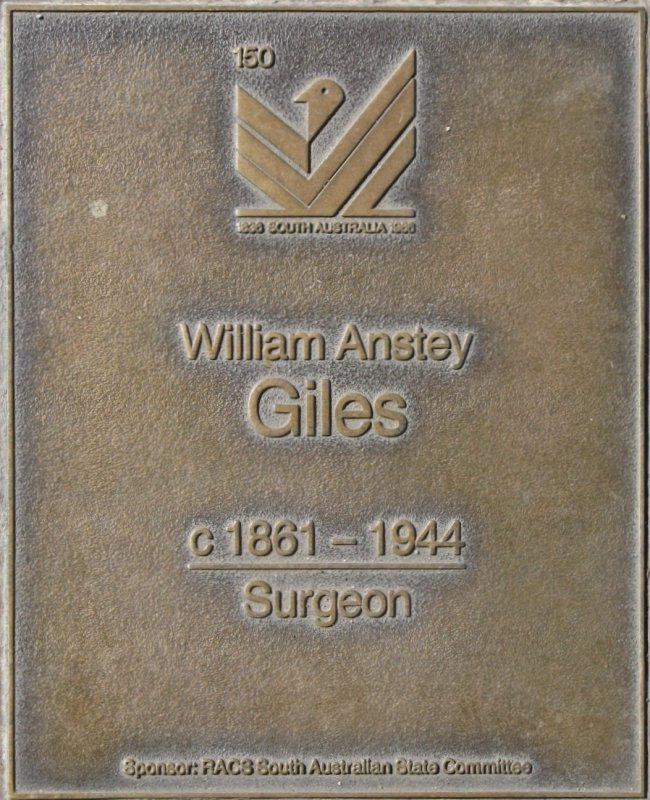
- Jubilee 150 Walkway Plaque commemorating William Giles
  Giles is commemorated with a bronze plaque on North Terrace, Adelaide.
- The annual Anstey Giles lecture was established in 1953 by the SA committee of the Royal Australasian College of Surgeons.

== Family ==
Giles married Rita Jones ( – 9 September 1907) of "Brocklesby", Melbourne, on 1 July 1891. Their only child died a few days after birth in 1892. They had a home on Barnard Street, North Adelaide.
