= Freda Gibson =

Australian flying doctor

Freda Evelyn Gibson
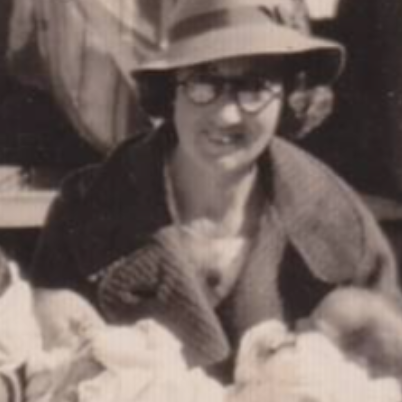
- in 1935
- Born: Freda Evelyn Ehmcke; February 7, 1908; Fullarton
- Died: June 12, 1977 (aged 69); Adelaide
- Education: Presbyterian Girls' College; University of Adelaide
- Employer: Anglicans' Bush Church Aid Society
- Known for: "Australia's only woman flying doctor"
- Spouse(s): Dr "Roy" Gibson; Mervyn George Kennedy
- Children: three

Freda Evelyn Gibson born Freda Ehmcke OBE (1908-1977) was an Australian flying doctor from 1938 to 1954 in South Australia. She was called "Australia's only woman flying doctor".

== Life ==
Gibson was born in 1908 in the Adelaide suburb of Fullarton. Her parents were Flora Evelyn (born Stoye) and her husband Albert Paul Oscar Ehmcke. She was educated locally including at the Presbyterian Girls' College where she was an enthusiastic sportswoman, but never learned to swim. She went on to study medicine at the University of Adelaide graduating in 1931.

In 1933 she began to practice at Ceduna, based at a cottage hospital funded by the Anglicans' Bush Church Aid Society. She joined fellow doctor Robert Welch Gibson (known as Roy), whom she had married on 3 February 1933. They would travel to assist people via long car journeys. In 1937 the hospital was upgraded and in 1938 the first plane arrived. It was a de Havilland Fox Moth, with which a pilot could transport both a doctor and a patient simultaneously. Previously it had taken eight to ten hours to get to Cook, one of the most remote settlements in Australia and since abandoned. Now, it could be done in three, delivering a doctor who was less exhausted to treat a patient. Before the plane was available, very sick patients had to face a 26-hour train ride, and many died during the journey.

Gibson carried out lots of surgery, and with the aid of the plane could do routine visits to distant locations where minor treatments could be given. She noted in an interview in 1938 that she visited stone huts where Aboriginal Australian people lived. She had to do the operations there, as she could not bring them to her hospital, because the other patients would complain.

The Gibsons' medical practice covered an area of more than 80,000 square miles (210,000 km^{2}) from their base in Ceduna, an area bigger than England. She later used a de Havilland Dragon plane and her pilot was Alan Chadwick. They had three — and later four — hospitals in their area of operation, including one at Cook.

In 1940, during World War II, her husband joined the Army and she was the only flying doctor in the region until he returned in 1944.

She was awarded an OBE in 1946 for her war time service and in giving her this award it was estimated that she had made 214 flights, travelled 37,663 miles (60,613 km) and treated 2,769 patients. Her husband died in 1948 of heart failure (after he was bitten by a snake) and, shortly after this, she accepted the role of health officer for the region - taking over from him.

In 1954 Gibson retired from being the only woman flying doctor. Her role was taken up by her assistant, Dr Merna Miller, who took over the title of Australia's only woman flying doctor. Her reason for retiring was that she wanted to have better access to her family as both her daughters were in Adelaide.

She continued as a doctor in Adelaide, where she opened a private practice. She married again in 1968 to Mervyn George Kennedy.

Gibson died in hospital in Adelaide in 1977.
