= T. B. Robson =

South Australian fruit grower)

Thomas Binns Robson
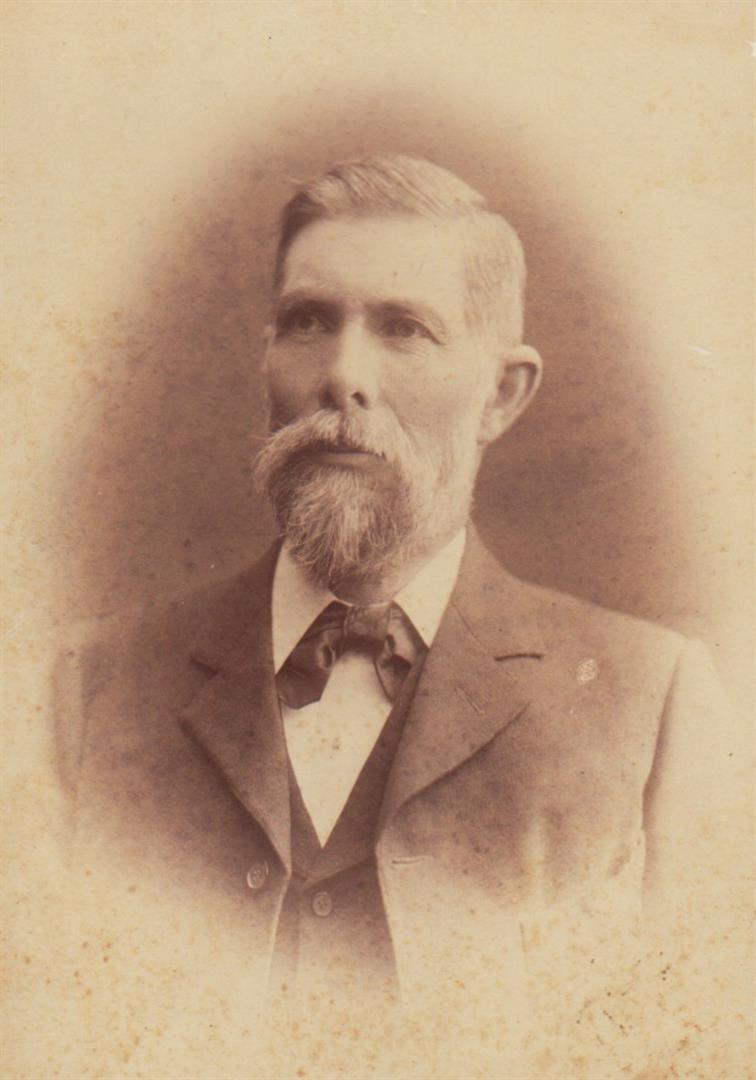
- Born: 1843
- Died: 1925 (aged 81–82)
- Occupation: South Australian horticulturist

Thomas Binns Robson (21 September 1843 – 22 April 1925) was a fruitgrower in South Australia, known for his introduction into the colony of the fig wasp, responsible for fertilizing the Smyrna fig, and for his association with the Society of Friends (Quakers).

== History ==
Robson was born in Liscard Vale, Cheshire, a son of Henry Ellithorp (or Ellythorp) Robson, later of Ambleside, in Cumbria.

After leaving school he was employed in a Liverpool cotton broking business and in 1867 visited Adelaide, where he met Henrietta Watson, daughter of Henry Watson, a chemist of Kermode Street, North Adelaide. They married at the Friends' meeting house, Liscard, on 1 March 1871, and left for Adelaide the same year, arriving by the barque Corrientes in August 1871. They purchased 20 acres (8.1 ha) of land at Hectorville, naming it "Ellythorp". There they established an orchard and vineyard, which in five years was turning a profit from fresh and dried fruit.

Around 1890 Robson began operating as "Robson and Son" with his son Harry.

In 1908 he purchased the adjacent Cosford Estate, and moved into Cosford House, his son Henry remaining at Ellythorp. At some later date Mary Bedford and Walter Robson also moved into Cosford House.

With the retirement and death of T. B. Robson, "Robson and Son" was Henry Binns Robson and Charles Henry Robson (1909–1985), married Clarice Jean in 1932.

The fruit processing business at Hectorville became "Robson Jarvis & Co." in 1934; the orchard was liquidated in the mid-1950s. It is likely the company then became established in the drive-in movies business.

== Religion ==
Robson came from an old Quaker family, and was for more than 40 years secretary of the Society of Friends in South Australia.

== Fruitgrower ==
Robson was a successful fruitgrower, both as exhibitor and as a market orchardist. He overcame the usual problem of low prices during times of surplus when he, like George McEwin of Glen Ewin fame, began producing dried fruit, jams and conserves, which found a ready market throughout the year, and won trophies at the Adelaide Show.

He grew grapes for the table, and for drying, but for his conscience' sake would not supply any for winemaking.

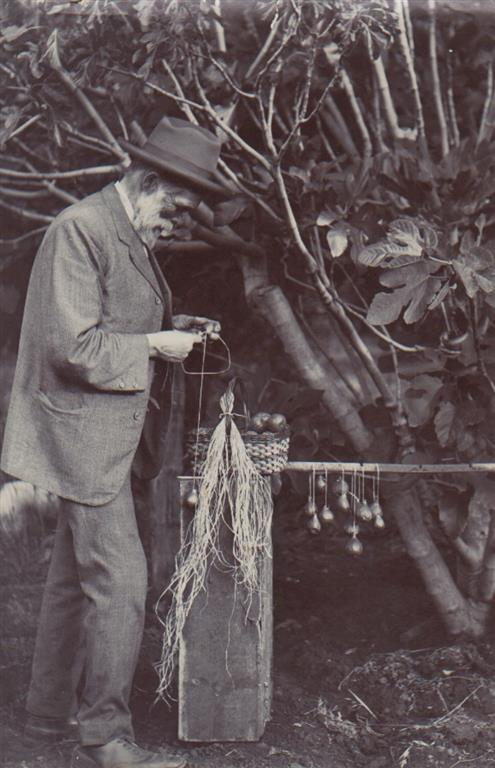
Thomas Binns Robson fertilizing Smyrna figs in 1909.

It had long been known that the Smyrna fig, popular as a dried fruit for its nutty flavor, required the service of the female fig wasp (Note: The female Blastophaga psenes (prev. grossorum) wasp, mates with the male, who is wingless and partially blind, in the inedible male fruit ("caprifig") of the Capri fig. The gravid female leaves the caprifig coated with pollen, and enters the immature Smyrna fruit to lay her eggs, incidentally fertilizing the Smyrna seeds, a process known as caprification.) to fertilize its thousands of tiny seeds with pollen from the inedible caprifig fruit.

Robson successfully grafted caprifig twigs to his Smyrna trees, and proved the theory by artificially transferring pollen between the two species with a pipette, but had many failed attempts at importing the wasps. The principle is straightforward — simply ship chilled caprifigs infested with Blastophaga larvae, which remain dormant through the Australian winter, then transfer them to his caprifigs. His supplier, George C. Roeding, of the California Nursery Company, took eight years of patient experimentation before in 1899 establishing a wasp colony in the USA, where there was not the additional challenge of alternate seasons from the source country.

Robson succeeded in 1909, not from his US supplier but by importing caprifigs from South Africa.

== Other interests ==
Robson was a member of the Central Agricultural Bureau and served as an executive of the Fruitgrowers' Association. He was also part of the South Australian Chamber of Manufactures 1876–1924 and the Council of Churches in South Australia (elected president in 1914). For many years, he acted as a steward in the flowers and pot plants section of the exhibitions held by the Royal Agricultural and Horticultural Society.

== Family ==
Robson married Henrietta Watson on 1 March 1871. Their family included:

- Henry Binns "Harry" Robson (9 November 1871 – 15 June 1955) married Annie Catherine Fryer on 9 September 1902.

- Charles Henry Robson (28 July 1909 – 1985)

- Mary Emily (5 March 1873 – 1926) married Alfred Bedford on 28 January 1909
- Helen Gertrude Robson (2 July 1876 – 1 September 1953) married Frederick Coleman in 1900
- William Ellythorp Robson (9 October 1877 – 17 February 1890)
- Walter Robson (1879–c. 1955)
