= Danish Lutheran Publishing House =

- Parent company: United Evangelical Lutheran Church
- Status: merged into Augsburg Fortress
- Country of origin: United States
- Publication types: Books, Magazines, Sheet Music

Danish Lutheran Publishing House was the publishing house of the United Evangelical Lutheran Church (ULCA).

The business ran from 1893 to 1960 and was based in Blair, Nebraska. An earlier publication, Kirkelig Samler (Church Gatherer) had been created in 1872 and led to the establishment of the DLPH.

The DLPH published hymn books, devotionals, novels and a Danish newspaper; however, as more customers started using English-language books, the business decided in 1943 to shorten its name to the Lutheran Publishing House.

In 1960, several Lutheran Church bodies merged to form the American Lutheran Church (ALC); at this time, the Danish Lutheran Publishing House merged with the other Lutheran publishing houses to form Augsburg Fortress.
