= William Gardner (surgeon) =

William Gardner (c.1846 – 7 April 1897) was a surgeon in the British colonies of South Australia and Victoria.

== Early life and education ==
William Forrest Gardner was born in Birkenhead, England, in c.1846, the eldest son of (Independent Presbyterian) Rev. John Gardner and his wife Catherine Gardner, née Forrest.

The Rev. Dr. Gardner, wife, servant and three children arrived in South Australia aboard Condor in March 1850 after accepting a call to take over the newly erected Chalmers Church (now Scots Church) on North Terrace, Adelaide, and served that congregation with distinction until 1868, when he accepted a call to Launceston Tasmania (which appointment got off to a bad start, then deteriorated and ended in bitter hostility). Gardner was educated at J. L. Young's Adelaide Educational Institution, and entered the English and Scottish Bank, where he worked for several years, before leaving to study medicine at the University of Melbourne, where he had a brilliant scholastic career, then proceeded to Glasgow University, where he studied hydatids for his thesis, which won for him a gold medal as well as his MD.

== Career ==
Gardner returned to Adelaide, where in 1875 he was appointed Junior House Surgeon under Dr. J. Davies Thomas at the Adelaide Hospital, then succeeded him as Senior House Surgeon. When he resigned to enter private practice, he was appointed Honorary Surgeon to the Adelaide Hospital, and gained a reputation for his skill as a surgeon, perhaps second only to Mr. Fitzgerald of Melbourne. His assistant for many years was Dr. Anstey Giles.

Both Giles and Gardner were associated with the Private Hospital, Wakefield Street, the first training hospital for nurses in the state.

He received a call from Melbourne to perform a very difficult operation — removal of a cancerous larynx — which had ended in the death of Emperor Frederick of Germany, but in this case, a Mr. Heymanson, successfully.

In 1892 Gardner accepted an appointment in Melbourne.

=== Professional appointments ===
Gardner was President of the South Australian Branch of the British Medical Association from 1883 to 1884, Honorary Surgeon at Adelaide Hospital, and Member of the Board of Management of the Adelaide Hospital for many years.

He was elected President of the Intercolonial Medical Congress in Sydney, 1893.

== Later life and death ==
In 1896 he left for England and the Continent, partly for his health and partly for continuation of his studies, and was returning to Melbourne, when he succumbed to a paralytic stroke in Naples, Italy, and died shortly afterwards, on 7 April 1897.

== Family ==
Gardner married Louisa Moore (26 Feb 1859 – 10 May 1940) on 30 March 1880. She was the elder daughter of Robert Waters Moore, M.R.C.S. (1819 – 6 December 1884), former Colonial Surgeon. They had no children.
