= Wartburg Press =

Former publisher of the American Lutheran Church

- Status: Merged
- Successor: Augsburg Publishing House
- Country of origin: United States
- Headquarters location: Columbus, Ohio
- Publication types: Books, magazines, sheet music
- Owner: American Lutheran Church

Wartburg Press was the publishing house of the first American Lutheran Church (ALC), formed in 1930.

It was founded in 1881 by the Iowa Synod and when that synod merged into the ALC in 1930, Wartburg became based in Columbus, Ohio. At the time of the merger of first ALC with other church bodies to form the second American Lutheran Church in 1960, Wartburg Press merged with the publishing houses of those other bodies to form Augsburg Publishing House.
