= Augsburg Fortress Publishers =

Official publishing house of the Evangelical Lutheran Church in America

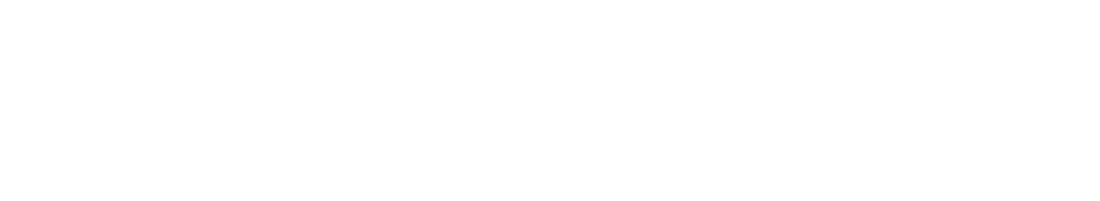
- Parent company: Evangelical Lutheran Church in America
- Predecessor: Augsburg Publishing House; Fortress Press
- Founded: 1988
- Country of origin: United States
- Headquarters location: Minneapolis, Minnesota
- Distribution: Books International, Inc. (US fulfillment); NBN International (UK); Multiple distributors (Asia and the Pacific)
- Publication types: Books, magazines, sheet music
- Imprints: Augsburg Fortress, Fortress Press, Broadleaf Books, Beaming Books, Sparkhouse
- Official website: www.augsburgfortresspublishers.org

Augsburg Fortress Publishers is the official publishing house of the Evangelical Lutheran Church in America (ELCA), headquartered in Minneapolis, Minnesota. Through various imprints, Augsburg Fortress Publishers publishes worship, music, curricular, and devotional resources and distinctive books for congregations, higher-education learning, scholars, children, and adult general readers. Andrew DeYoung is its CEO as of September 2026. Tim Blevins served as CEO from August 2018 to August 2026, preceded by Beth Lewis from September 2002 to July 2018.^{[1]}

== History ==
Augsburg Fortress was formed in 1988 when Fortress Press of Philadelphia, Pennsylvania, and Augsburg Publishing House of Minneapolis merged, after their parent denominations, the Lutheran Church in America (LCA) and the American Lutheran Church (ALC) merged to form the ELCA.

Augsburg Publishing House was affiliated with the ALC. It had been founded in 1891 at Augsburg Seminary in Minneapolis Both the publishing house and seminary were part of the United Norwegian Lutheran Church of America (UNLC). The publishing house left the seminary campus in 1894, relocating to the downtown area in 1908. By 1960 it had become the publishing house of the Evangelical Lutheran Church. With the 1960 merger of Lutheran denominations that formed the "new" American Lutheran Church, Augsburg was designated that church's publishing arm. It absorbed the publishing houses of the other denominations participating in the merger, including Wartburg Press (established 1881) of the "old" American Lutheran Church in Columbus, Ohio, and the Danish Lutheran Publishing House (established 1893) of the United Evangelical Lutheran Church in Blair, Nebraska. When the Lutheran Free Church joined the ALC in 1963, its publishing house, Messenger Press (established 1922), was also added.

Augsburg, and Wartburg before it, had published the old ALC denominational magazine The Lutheran Standard, which had ancestry back to the 1840s in the Evangelical Lutheran Joint Synod of Ohio.

Fortress Press was the publishing arm of the LCA, headquartered in northwest Philadelphia, Pennsylvania, in the Muhlenberg Building, a unique U-shaped brick building of Georgian architecture style. The building was named for Henry Melchoir Muhlenberg and other members of the Muhlenberg family who were important in American Lutheranism. Henry is considered the "Patriarch of American Lutheranism" and the prime organizer of the first Lutheran synod in America, the Pennsylvania Ministerium, in 1746.

Previous logo

The LCA came into existence in 1962 with the merger of several smaller Lutheran denominations. The largest forerunner of the Fortress Press was the Muhlenberg Press of the United Lutheran Church in America, the largest partner in the LCA merger. The oldest ancestor was the Henkel Press, started by the son of Paul Henkel, a famous late 18th and early 19th century Lutheran pastor, missionary, and evangelist in the Appalachian Mountains region.

Fortress published The Lutheran, the monthly magazine of the LCA and also of the earlier United Lutheran Church in America. The magazine had its beginnings in 1831 in publications of the General Synod.

Augsburg Fortress re-branded as 1517 Media from July 2016 to September 2024. In October 2024, the company reverted to its "doing business as" name, Augsburg Fortress Publishers—returning to a name that held resonance within the ELCA and connects them back to their roots. Augsburg Fortress continues to use its name as an imprint for church resources and Fortress Press as an imprint for academic and reference titles. Other imprints include Beaming Books, Broadleaf Books, and Sparkhouse.

== See also ==
- Concordia Publishing House, official publishing house of the Lutheran Church–Missouri Synod
- Northwestern Publishing House, official publishing house of the Wisconsin Evangelical Lutheran Synod
