= Ian B. Tanner =

The Reverend Ian Bowe Tanner
- Born: 24 February 1926; Launceston, Tasmania, Australia
- Died: 27 December 2013 (aged 87); Canberra, Australian Capital Territory, Australia
- Occupations: Uniting Church in Australia and Presbyterian Church of Australia minister
- Spouse: Joan
- Children: Andrew Tanner
- Parent: Thomas Alexander Tanner

Ian Bowe Tanner CMG (24 February 1926 – 27 December 2013) was an Australian Presbyterian and Uniting Church minister. He was President of the Uniting Church's Assembly between 1985 and 1988.

== Education ==
Tanner was educated at Trevallyn State School, Launceston Technical College and the University of Tasmania, where he resided at Christ College and graduated with a Bachelor of Science degree in 1950. He later obtained a Diploma of Education from the University of Adelaide and studied theology at Ormond College Theological Hall.

== Career ==
He served in the Royal Australian Air Force from 21 April 1944 to 22 August 1945 as a Leading Aircraftman, and prior to training for the Presbyterian ministry worked as an Industrial Chemist at Patons and Baldwins in Launceston from 1950 to 1955.

He was ordained in 1959, and subsequently ministered at:

- Prahran Presbyterian Church, 1956–1958
- North Box Hill Presbyterian Church, 1959–1963
- Scots Church, Adelaide: as associate minister (from 1963) and collegiate minister (1965–1980)
- Director of Lay Education (South Australia) (from 1980)
- President of the Assembly (1985–1988)
- Mission Director (South Australia)
- Wesley Church, Canberra (1992-1996)

He was the first Moderator of the UCA Synod of South Australia from 1977 to 1979.

He retired in 1996.

== Family ==
He was the son of Thomas Alexander Tanner (-1947).

His son Andrew Tanner was a member of the band Seven Stories.

== Publications ==
Among his publications is a 2002 biography of Beryl Grant AO, OBE, FRCNA.

Religious titles
Preceded by Rolland Busch	President of the Assembly, Uniting Church in Australia; 1985–1988	Succeeded by Ronald Wilson
