= James R. Anderson =

Lawyer in the Colony and State of South Australia

James Robert Anderson KC (12 June 1864 – 7 April 1913) was a lawyer in the Colony and State of South Australia. He was unique in South Australia and possibly Australia in serving as Attorney General without being a Member of Parliament.

== History ==
Anderson was born in Adelaide the youngest son of building contractor James Anderson and his wife Margaret Anderson, née Moffat. James arrived in South Australia in 1848 but cannot be found in shipping records for that year. He married Margaret Moffat at Stornoway, Scotland on 12 June 1854.

Anderson was educated by one Mr. Mutton then at Richmond Baker's private school, followed by the Grote Street Public School. There he won an exhibition, which took him to Prince Alfred College, then studied law at the University of Adelaide. In January 1881 he was articled to Sir John Bray, received his LL.B. in 1884 and was admitted to the Bar in July 1885.

He started in practice as a solicitor, and formed a partnership with R(obert Andrew) Carr Castle (1863–1931) in 1886, with offices in Mutual Chambers, King William Street. In 1896 he was admitted to the partnership Gordon & Bright. Anderson married a daughter of the principal, John Hannah Gordon, shortly after. The partnership was dissolved in 1903 when Sir John was appointed to the Supreme Court Bench. In May 1906 Anderson entered into partnership Sir John's nephew James Leslie Gordon (1884 – 25 July 1915), with offices at Unity Chambers, Currie Street.

Anderson and Arthur William Piper "took silk" (were appointed King's Counsel) on 10 April 1911. At the time there were only six K.C.s: C. J. Dashwood, Sir John Downer, E. B. Grundy, G. J. R. Murray, Paris Nesbit and Sir Josiah Symon. In 1908 there were nine, but since then Sir Richard Baker, C. C. Kingston, and J. M. Stuart had died.

He received considerable praise for his conduct of the prosecution in the 1902 Miles Flynn case, in which £1500 in notes and specie was stolen by highway robbers near the Block 14 company's smelting works at Port Adelaide.

== Politics ==
In 1902 he sat for the House of Assembly seat of Port Adelaide, and missed out by three votes in a strongly Labor district, a tribute to his powers of advocacy.

He was on 1 March 1905 appointed by Premier Butler to the Cabinet position of Attorney-General of South Australia without having a seat in Parliament. His appointment, which created considerable controversy, was terminated on 26 July 1905 by incoming Premier Thomas Price.

== Other interests ==
Anderson was

- closely involved with literary societies, and won first place at the first Literary Societies' Union competition for his essay "Australian Federation". He was treasurer of the Union in 1885 and a prominent member of that organization's Union Parliament.
- on the committee of the South Australian Football League
- on the committee of the Adelaide Racing Club from 1904, and in 1907 was elected chairman, a position he held until August 1909, when W. B. Carr was elected.
- a member of the League of Wheelmen

and served for a term as Chairman of each.

- He was an enthusiastic member of the South Australian Militia, and reached the rank of captain in either the 10th Infantry or B Company, 1st Battalion, Adelaide Rifles.

== Family ==
Anderson married (Annie) Louise Gordon, eldest daughter of John Hannah Gordon, on 29 October 1896. There were no children.

He died at Ru Rua Hospital, North Adelaide, after several weeks' painful illness.

Architect William Anderson (1856 – December 1928) and John Anderson (1860– ) of Perth were brothers.
