= George Young (priest) =

George Edward Young (15 February 1852 – 27 September 1937) was the Dean of Adelaide from 1906 until 1933.

== History ==
Young was born near Winchester, a son of the Rev. Peter Young, Rector of North Witham and Prebendary of Lincoln, England, and educated at The Royal Grammar School Guildford. He emigrated to South Australia in 1875 and after working on outback properties and at the Wallaroo mine, he was ordained in 1887. After missionary work in South Australia’s outback he was incumbent at Port Pirie from 1888 to 1891; and at Kapunda from 1891 to 1894. He was Rector of Mount Gambier from 1894 to 1906 and its archdeacon from 1896 to 1906.

== Personal ==
On 23 December 1882 Young married Wilhelmina Wilson "Mina" Roe née Haining (1844 – 26 November 1925); their only child was Dorothea Caroline Young (29 August 1884 – 1961). Mina was the eldest daughter of Robert Haining (1802–1874), South Australia's first Presbyterian minister, and the widow of Police Inspector John Henry Roe (c. 1835–1877).

Religious titles
| Preceded by Charles Marryat | Dean of Adelaide; 1906–1933 | Succeeded by George Herbert Jose |
