= Brunswick Baptist Church =

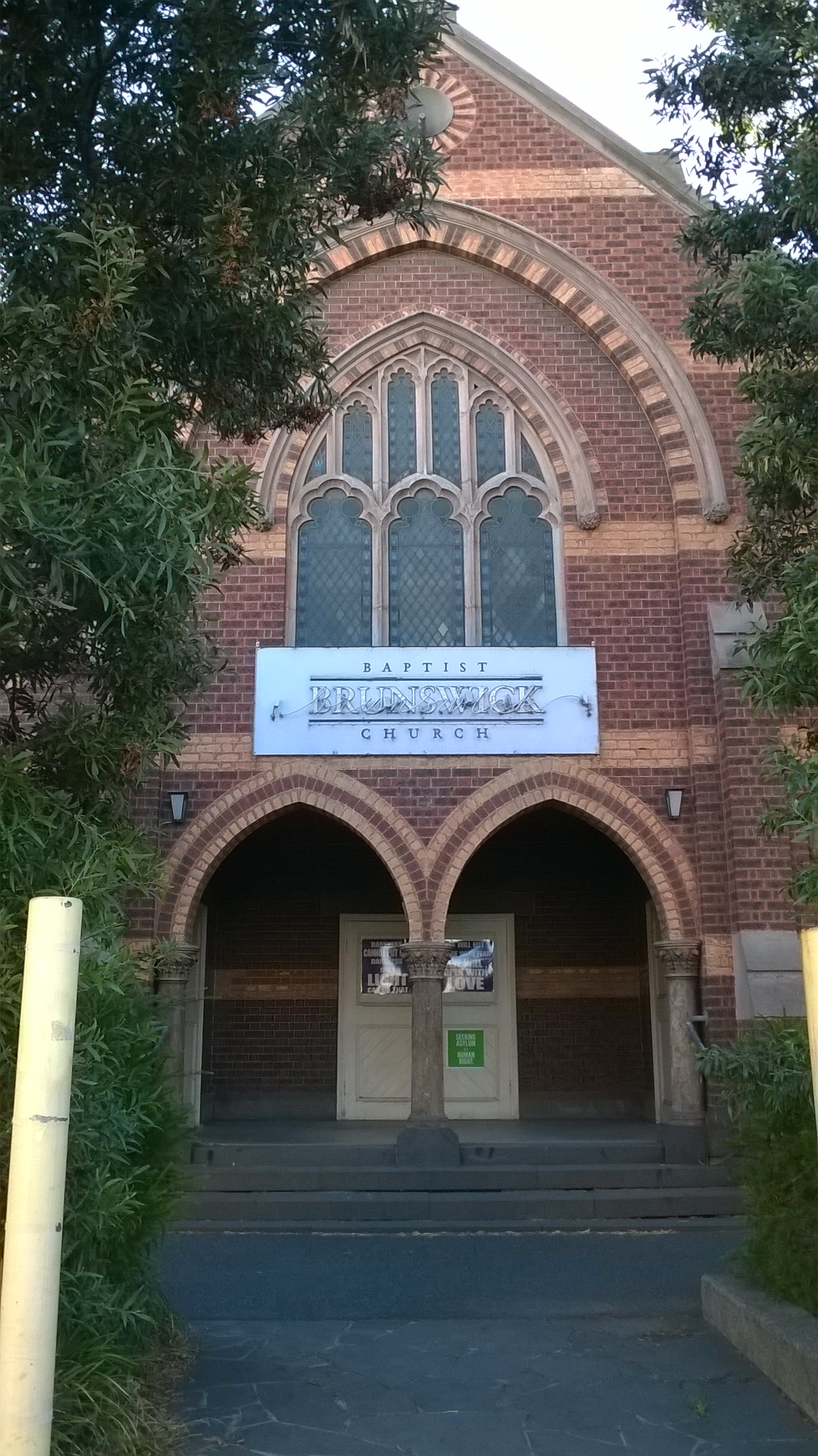
- Brunswick Baptist Church
- Brunswick Baptist Church
- 37°45′56″S 144°57′44″E
- Location: 491 Sydney Road, Brunswick, Melbourne, Victoria
- Country: Australia
- Denomination: Baptist
- Website: brunswickbaptistchurch.org.au

History
- Status: Church
- Founded: 30 May 1889
- Dedicated: 1889

Architecture
- Functional status: Active
- Architectural type: Church
- Style: Gothic Revival

Clergy
- Pastor: Mark Payne

The Brunswick Baptist Church is a Baptist church in 491 Sydney Road, Brunswick, Melbourne, Victoria, Australia. The church is affiliated with the Australian Baptist Ministries.

== History ==
The congregation was started in 1859 by Geo Burton and John Wallis, who were parishioners of the former Sydney Road Methodist Church (whose building now houses the Sydney Road Community School). As a result, the Baptist Church has been present on this site since 1862. The foundation stone was laid on 30 May 1889. However, the church building was only built in 1889.

The organ was built by Gray and Davison, and it was originally meant for St Pancras Old Church in central London. It was installed in this church in 1929 by Frederick Taylor, when it was donated to the church by Frederick William Biggs.

The current pastor is Mark Payne.

== Heritage significance ==
The church building was designed in the Gothic Revival architectural style, polychrome masonry.

It was listed by Heritage Victoria with a "Heritage Overlay," which aims to protect places of local significance to Victoria.
