= James Henderson (minister) =

James Henderson (28 January 1820 – 19 April 1905) was a Scottish-born Presbyterian minister in Victoria and South Australia who was twice removed from his church after allegations of misconduct.

== Career ==
Henderson was born in Scotland and was educated at Glasgow University. In 1850, he took charge of the United Presbyterian Church at Duntocher, and after eight years there accepted a call to the Ryrie Street Presbyterian Church at Geelong, Victoria. He arrived aboard Lightning in Australia in March 1859, and was inducted on 17 May. The Hendersons were well accepted by the community and Rev. Henderson held various responsible positions including Moderator of the Victorian Assembly, examiner at the Central Grammar School and member of the Orphan Asylum board, Geelong Hospital and Mechanics' Institute. He gave many public lectures on historical subjects. In January 1866 a deputation from the congregation presented him with a purse of gold sovereigns, and Mrs. Henderson with a silver tea service, traditional expressions of appreciation. Four months later the atmosphere changed entirely: a series of accusations of a serious nature were levelled against Henderson, and the Melbourne presbytery of the United Presbyterian Church of Victoria set up a board of enquiry which sat from 23 May 1866 to investigate the matter. The serious accusation against Henderson was not tested, however on the basis of his admitted levity when answering the charge he was removed from the Geelong ministry, but not from the ministry or the Church. The grounds for his removal were later given as his loss of usefulness to the Geelong church by the rumours which had spread as to the nature of the complaints. Henderson asked in vain for a report on the charges which had been laid against him.

As Henderson left Geelong for Ballarat, where he was to preach at Sebastopol, he was presented with a purse of sovereigns by a party of townsmen in appreciation of his long service. By March 1867 he had received calls from the thriving South Australian towns of Moonta, Wallaroo and Port Adelaide He accepted the offer from the Port Adelaide Presbyterian Church, which boasted among its members John Hannah Gordon and David Bews.

In 1871, he was called to St. Andrew's Church, Wakefield Street, Adelaide where he was a popular preacher and minister. Early in 1871, he returned to Scotland, where his brother William Henderson (1827–1881), a noted industrial chemist, was dying. On his return to Adelaide he was confronted by the Assembly, who had received libels regarding him. Unable or unwilling to defend himself, he was summarily dismissed from the Church.

== Other interests ==
- He founded the St. Andrew's Literary Society in 1872.
- His family home from 1896 was previously a Wesleyan manse on East Terrace, which he dubbed "Duntocher".

== Family ==
James Henderson (28 January 1820 – ) married Elizabeth Ramsay (c. 1823 – 7 January 1888) on 11 January 1846

- Agnes Henderson (1850 – 15 May 1936) married Rev. John McEwin (1845 – 9 May 1894) in 1872, lived in North Adelaide. John was a son of orchardist George McEwin.

- George McEwin (1873– ) married Evelyn Jones ( – ) in 1906
- Eliza Ramsay McEwin (1875– ) married Robert Bruce ( – ) in 1899
- (James) Guthrie McEwin (1878– )
- Jessie McEwin (1880– )
- (John) Oswald McEwin (1883– )

- Elizabeth Henderson (c. 1852 – 3 May 1896) married Sir John William Downer (6 July 1843 – 2 August 1915) in 1871. Their children included:

- John Henry Downer (1872– )
- James Frederick Downer (1874– )
Sir John married again, to Una Stella Haslingden Russell. They had a son Alexander Russell Downer in 1910, and a grandson Alexander Downer, Foreign Minister in the Howard government.

- James Henderson (19 August 1854 – 2 November 1905) married Ann Jessie "Annie" Wood (14 September 1863 – 23 October 1947) on 22 June 1887. She was a daughter of Gilbert Wood ( – ) James was a solicitor.

- Annie Ramsay Henderson (8 April 1888 – 21 August 1969)
- Marjorie McMillan Henderson (3 April 1891 – )
- Marie Katrine Henderson (31 July 1896 – )
- Gilbert Roy Bruce Hendersoon (1 November 1899 – 1971)

- second son Dr. John Henderson Henderson (c. 1859 – 12 February 1909) married Janet Love Johnston in 1883, lived at "Fern Hill", Crafers

- William Henderson ( – ) solicitor of Victor Harbor
- Barton Henderson ( – )

- William Henderson ( – ) married Mary Williamson Binnie ( – ) on 17 March 1898
- Bruce Johnstone Henderson (c. 1867 – 10 July 1942) lived New South Wales
- Robert Henderson ( – ) lived at Kalgoorlie
- Margaret Henderson ( – 7 March 1902) married George Edward Fulton ( – 1 July 1895) in 1881. She died at Lausanne, Switzerland. He was founder of G. E. Fulton & Co., Ltd., of Kilkenny
- Jane Taylor Henderson (c. 1863 – 7 February 1877)

A brother, William Henderson (1827–1881) invented the wet process for extracting copper from pyrites after extraction of the sulphur content for sulphuric acid, and established a major industry for Irvine, Scotland.
