= W. B. Carr =

Australian journalist and sportsman

Whitmore Blake Carr (12 October 1861 – 26 August 1943), was a journalist, sportsman in South Australia and longtime chairman of the Adelaide Stock Exchange. He has been referred to as "Doc" Carr.

== History ==
Carr was born in Dungog, New South Wales the son of Anglican Rev. Whitmore Carr (c. 1820 – 18 May 1903), who left New South Wales for South Australia around 1864 to take charge of St. Bartholmew's Church in Norwood.

He was educated at Adelaide Educational Institution, then at age 14 joined the staff of the South Australian Register. For some years he was the Register's political reporter, and was noted for his integrity and discretion. He was also "caller" at Adelaide racetracks for many years.

He resigned from The Register in 1890 to take the position of Chairman of the Adelaide Stock Exchange, a position he held until 1930. He was elected vice-president in 1902, and served as president in 1904, serving in that position for 25 years, a British Empire record.

On the resignation of W. Moxon Cook, ("Trumpator" in The Register) in 1892, to become "Terlinga" in The Australasian, Carr was invited back as part-time racing journalist and wrote as "Tarquin" from then to 1904. He retired from The Register in May 1904, just prior to his marriage to Clara Jane Bonnin, and was succeeded by Hadrian Moody (pen-name "Mostyn"), for some years Carr's assistant.

He was elected to the Adelaide Racing Club committee, and succeeded James R. Anderson as chairman, serving from 1909 to 1919, when he resigned to join the committee of the South Australian Jockey Club. He was elected S.A.J.C. chairman in 1924, a position he held until 1940, when he declined to stand, but was reappointed to the committee every year thereafter, the last being just a few weeks before his death.

== Other interests ==
He was a director of Advertiser Newspapers Ltd. for over 12 years He was a director of the Adelaide board of Guardian Assurance Company. He was a committee member of Woodlands School. He was a President of the Amateur Athletic Association. He was a Chairman of the South Australian National Football League. He was a member of the Royal Society for the Prevention of Cruelty to Animals, the Mount Lofty Convalescent Home and the Glenelg Institute.

He was a committee member of the Chamber of Commerce for over 30 years, and a delegate to the sixth congress of the Chambers of Commerce of the British Empire in London in 1906.

== Recognition ==
- He was appointed honorary steward to the A.R.C., Tattersalls, Onkaparinga and Adelaide Hunt Clubs.
- He was elected life member of the Adelaide Stock Exchange, the only person to be so honoured.
- He was made life member of the S.A.J.C. in January 1939.
- He was made life member of the Adelaide Racing Club.

== Family ==
He married four times:

- Jessie Annie Cooke on 9 December 1886
- Clara Jane Bonnin, née Simms, widow of solicitor Fred Bonnin (died 14 September 1901) on 2 June 1904. Clara was the youngest daughter of William Knox Simms. Clara Jane Carr died 6 January 1908.
- Eleanor Josephine Kither, née Turnbull (15 April 1879 – 8 April 1928) on 3 October 1914
- Millicent Myrtle Leitch on 15 February 1936

He was survived by his widow, a stepson and two stepdaughters, His home was at Partridge Street, Glenelg.
