= Messenger Press =

- Parent company: Lutheran Free Church
- Status: Merged into Augsburg Fortress
- Country of origin: United States
- Publication types: Books, magazines, sheet music

Messenger Press was the publishing house of the Lutheran Free Church (LFC).

The business was established in 1949.

In 1960, the Lutheran Free Church merged with other church bodies to form the "new" American Lutheran Church; the Messenger Press then merged with the other publishing houses to form Augsburg Fortress.
