= John Hannah Gordon =

Scottish-Australian politician and judge

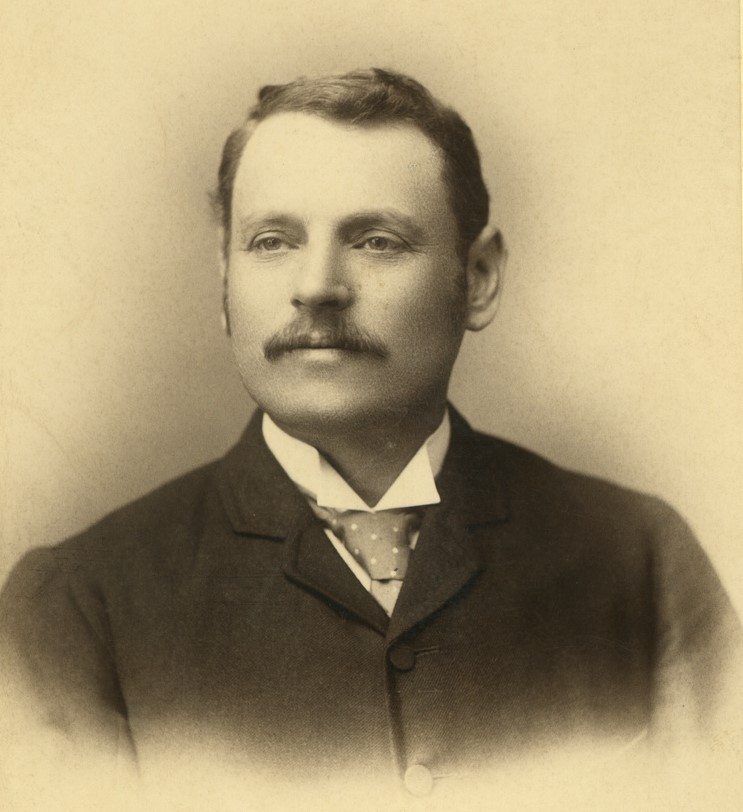
John Hannah Gordon

Sir John Hannah Gordon KC (26 July 1850 – 23 December 1923) was a Scottish-Australian politician and judge. He was a member of the South Australian Legislative Council from 1888 to 1892 and from 1893 to 1903. He was a minister under four Premiers: John Cockburn, Frederick Holder, Charles Kingston and John Jenkins, variously as Minister for Education, Chief Secretary, Attorney-General, and Minister Controlling the Northern Territory. He was a judge of the Supreme Court of South Australia from 1903.

== Early life ==
Gordon was born at Kilmacolm, Renfrewshire, Scotland, the eldest son of the Rev. James Gordon, preacher of the Free Church, and his wife Margaret, née Leonard. The family emigrated to South Australia in 1859 where Rev. Gordon became a minister in Mount Barker before later moving to Gawler. Gordon's younger brother, William Beattie Gordon, who was born in Gawler, became a member of parliament in Western Australia.

On 4 January 1877 at the Presbyterian church, Strathalbyn, Gordon married Ann Wright Rogers (20 February 1855 – 20 April 1951), youngest daughter of William Rogers MHA. They had two sons and two daughters.

== Women's Suffrage ==
Gordon introduced the successful Bill for women's suffrage into the Legislative Council in July 1894. Of the five members of the South Australian Parliament who introduced bills providing votes for women, four were Scottish born and the fifth, Edward Charles Stirling, although born in South Australia had Scots parents. Their shared philosophy was that the demand to enfranchise women was based on the principle of equity and would not result in social upheaval.

== Later life ==
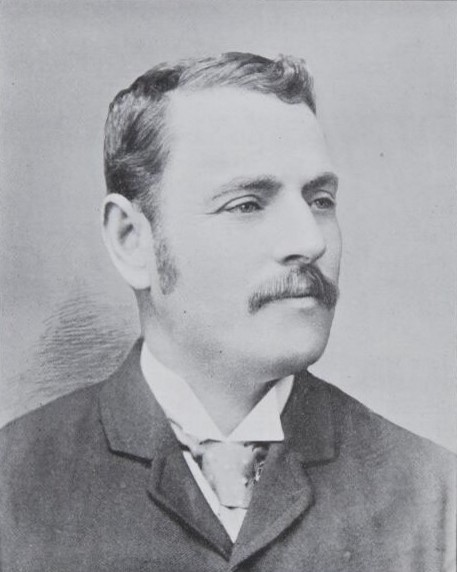

Following his political career Gordon became a Supreme Court Justice for South Australia and he was knighted in 1908.

In February 1913 Gordon declined an invitation from Billy Hughes to move to the High Court.

Gordon was also a lecturer on literary subjects, such as the Elizabethan period, publishing occasional articles in the Adelaide press.

Gordon died in Adelaide, South Australia of cardiac disease on 23 December 1923. On 4 January 1877, he married Ann "Annie" Rogers (20 Feb 1855 – 20 Apr 1951) who survived him.

- Annie Louise Gordon (3 November 1877 – 18 June 1955) married James Robert Anderson KC (12 June 1864 – 7 April 1913) on 29 October 1896. Anderson was Attorney General for four months in 1905. She married a second time, to Dr. Edgar Jabez Brown on 2 March 1915. She was, as Louise Brown, author of the novel Paul Strange and other works.
- (Margaret) Kathleen Gordon (13 July 1882 – 1958), married Neil Campbell (11 September 1882 – April 1918) on 23 May 1914. Neil served in the Boer War and was a member of the Tunnelling Corps in World War I, killed in action.
