= John Raymond Wilton =

Australian mathematician (1884–1944)

- Born: May 2, 1884
- Died: April 12, 1944 (aged 59); Adelaide
- Burial place: West Terrace cemetery, Adelaide

John Raymond Wilton (2 May 1884 – 12 April 1944), invariably referred to as J. R. Wilton, was an Australian-born mathematician. In the period of 1926–1934 Wilton published 26 research papers on analysis and number theory. For which he gained the Doctorate in science from the University of Cambridge in 1930 and in 1935 he was the first person to receive the Thomas Ranken Lyle Medal from the Australian National Research Council.

== Early life ==
Wilton was born at Belfast, Victoria, the eldest son of Annie Isabel Wilton, née Gladstones (14 March 1862 – 3 June 1927), and Charles Richard Wilton (c. 1855 – 8 March 1927), of the Bank of Victoria, Dublin, but later head of the literary staff of The Advertiser. His Wilton forbears had impeccable Wesleyan Methodists credentials: his grandfather John Wilton, a schoolchum of W. Morley Punshon, was a Methodist preacher who came out to Victoria in 1882. He was educated at Prince Alfred College from age 7½ years, winning two Elder scholarships and the Old Collegians' scholarship and in his final year dux of the school.

== Education and scholarships ==
At the University of Adelaide, Wilton graduated with first-class honours in mathematics and in physics (B.Sc). Professor Sir William Bragg praised Wilton for his natural genius in mathematics among any of his students. In 1904, Wilton proceeded to Trinity College, Cambridge for B.A., 1907 and M.A., 1911. He was awarded a sizarship and won the Jeston scholarship in 1905. In 1914, he received his Doctor of Science from University of Adelaide.

== Career ==
In 1908, he joined as an assistant lecturer in the Cavendish Laboratory. Later, he worked as Lecturer in mathematics at the University of Sheffield from 1909 to 1919. In 1920 he returned to Australia, and served as Professor of Mathematics at Adelaide University until his death in 1944. He was also a member of Edinburgh Mathematical Society since 1928.

On 12 April 1944, he died of a cerebral hemorrhage and was buried in West Terrace Cemetery, Adelaide.

== Other interests ==
Wilton was a dedicated Methodist, representing his church on the Council of Churches, being elected president in 1926.

== Notable publications ==
Wilton published 26 research papers during the period of 1926–1934. Some notable publications are

- On plane waves of sound (1913)
- On the highest wave in deep water (1913)
- On deep water waves (1914)
- Figures of equilibrium of rotating fluid under the restriction that the figure is to be a surface of revolution (1914)
- On the potential and force function of an electrified spherical bowl (1914–15)
- On ripples (1915)
- On the solution of certain problems of two-dimensional physics (1915)
- A pseudo-sphere whose equation is expressible in terms of elliptic functions (1915)
- A formula in zonal harmonics (1916–17)
