= W. A. Langsford =

Australian Methodist minister

Rev. William Alfred Langsford (1851 – 21 November 1930) was a Methodist minister in South Australia.

== History ==
Langsford was born in Norwood, South Australia, the second son of lay preacher John Langsford (died 3 July 1895) who arrived by the Sea Queen in March 1850. He was a grandson of John Langsford (c. 1788 – 26 August 1870) of Alphington, Devon, near Exeter.

He was educated at the Pulteney Street School and Prince Alfred College. In 1874 he was accepted for training as a Wesleyan Methodist minister, and began his ministry in 1876, serving his probationary period at Laura and Port Augusta. He spent 13 years in the northern circuits and five years on Yorke Peninsula, then 13 years in city and suburbs, serving at Norwood, Unley, Hindmarsh, Payneham, and Prospect. He then went to the South-East, and from 1902 to 1904 was chairman of the South-Eastern district. He was

- secretary of the Wesleyan Methodist Conference 1895–1898
- president of the Methodist Conference in 1898 and in 1924
- the first chairman of the Mount Gambier School of Mines
- president of Prince Alfred College, the first ex-student to be so honored
- Langsford was general secretary of the Twentieth Century Fund for two years
- treasurer of the Theological College for 25 years
- chaplain at the Adelaide Hospital for 10 years.

== Family ==
On 24 March 1880 Langsford married Catherine Helen Catt (1858 – 1931), a daughter of Alfred Catt MHA. Their children include:

- Alfred Stanley Langsford (1883–1965) married Bessie Blackler Colton on 26 January 1912, lived at Mount Lofty
- Cpt. John Kingsley Langsford ( – 21 August 1956), of Parakylia station
- Roy Hartley Langsford (1891–1962), of Brighton
- Wilfred Wolseley "Fred" Langsford (1894 – ) married Eva Gertrude Richards BA on 30 September 1919. She made headlines after attempting suicide and murder of their four children. She was found guilty but released without penalty.
- Helen Clifford "Nellie" Langsford married M(ethuselah) Prisk Tregoning (died 22 December 1916) on 8 September 1906

She married again, to Richard Mitchell, on 29 May 1919.

- Hilda Hope Isabel Langsford (1889–1963) and
- Dorothy Mary Langsford (1896– ), both of Prospect

They had a home at 3 Flora Terrace, Prospect

His brother Arthur Langsford (c. 1855 – 13 September 1927) was an insurance executive, founder and president of the Methodist Local Preachers and Laymen's Association.
