= Scots Church, Adelaide =

Scots Church
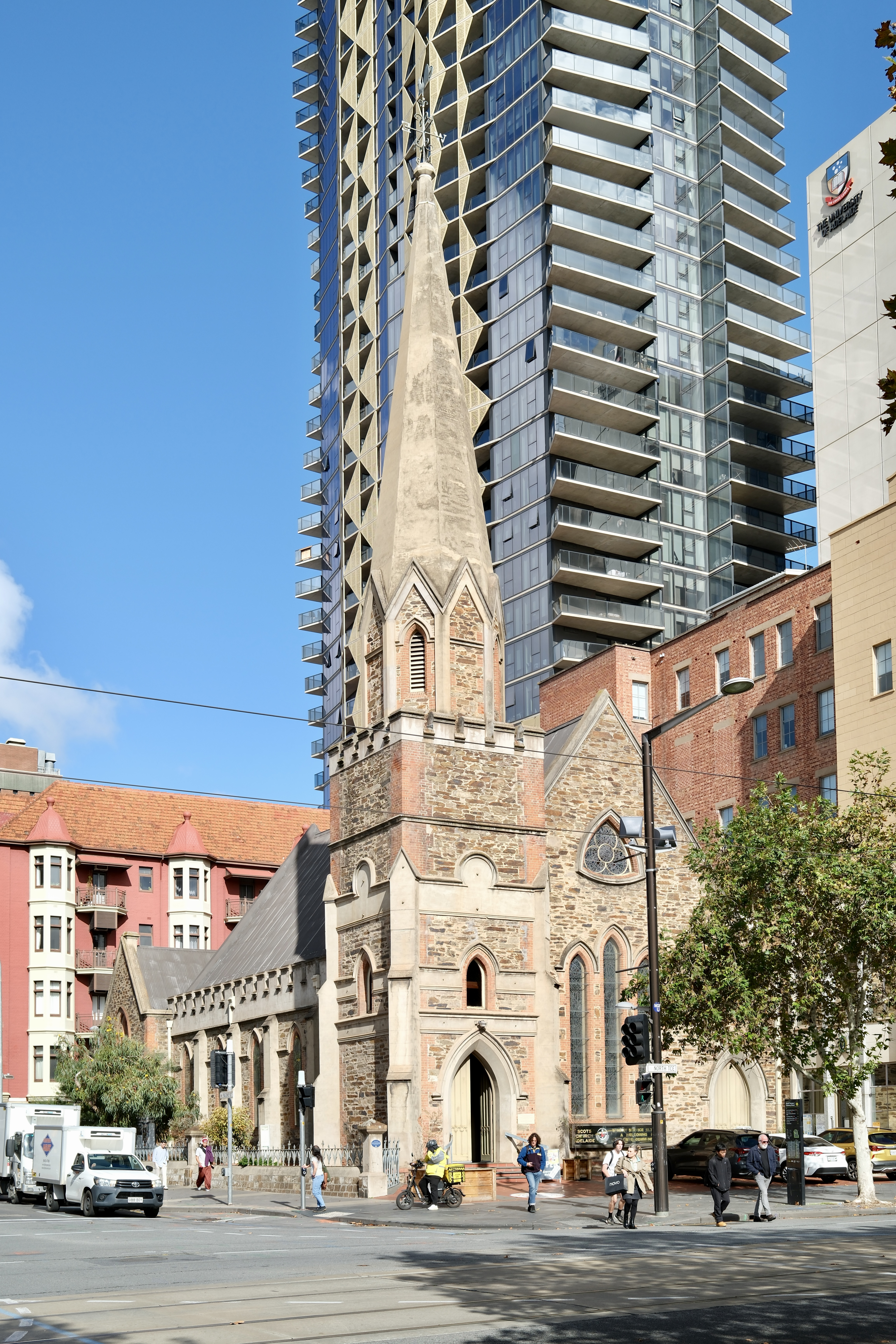
- The church in 2026
- Scots Church
- 34°55′18″S 138°36′19″E
- Address: 237 North Terrace, Adelaide, South Australia
- Country: Australia
- Denomination: Uniting (since 1977)
- Previous denomination: Free Church of Scotland (1850 – 1865); Presbyterian (SA) (1865 – 1901); Presbyterian (1901 – 1977)
- Website: scotschurch.org.au

History
- Former name: Chalmers Church
- Status: Church
- Founded: 3 September 1850
- Founder: Reverend John Gardner
- Dedication: Rev. Thomas Chalmers
- Dedicated: 6 July 1851

Architecture
- Functional status: Active
- Architect: English & Brown
- Architectural type: Church
- Style: Gothic Revival
- Completed: 1858 (spire)
- Construction cost: A£2,572

Specifications
- Materials: Stone; shingles

South Australian Heritage Register
- Official name: Church - Scots
- Type: State Heritage Place
- Designated: 11 September 1986
- Reference no.: 13370

Scots Church is a Uniting church on the southwest corner of North Terrace and Pulteney Street in Adelaide, the capital city of South Australia. Founded by the Free Church of Scotland, the stone church was one of the early churches built in the new city in 1850, built as the Chalmers Church.

== History ==
A prominent group of immigrants to South Australia, settled by Europeans from 1836, supported the Free Church of Scotland movement. This group called Reverend John Gardner from Scotland, and established Chalmers Free Church, named after Rev. Thomas Chalmers, the first moderator of the Free Church of Scotland in 1843. Gardner arrived in the colony in March 1850. He immediately initiated buying the land on the corner of North Terrace and Pulteney Street from (later Sir) John Morphett, and appointed English & Brown as architects and builders, comprising Thomas English and his brother-in-law Henry Brown. Chalmers laid the foundation stone on 3 September 1850. He held the first service in the new building on 6 July 1851.

The cost of land and building was £2,572 against the estimate of £1,800 despite cost-saving measures which included substituting a shingle roof for slate tiles. The loan to the church, of £1,000 at 12½ per cent interest, was guaranteed by trustees Capt. William Elder, George Young, George Elder, jun., Charles Matthew and Henry Chapman. The 120 feet (37 m) spire was added in 1858 at an additional cost of £200 and a bell, brought out from England, was donated by (later Sir) Thomas Elder.

The Presbytery of the Free Presbyterian Church of South Australia was formed 9 May 1854.

The Free Presbyterian Church, United Presbyterian Church and the Church of Scotland merged in 1865 to form one Presbyterian Church of South Australia, although a section of the Free Presbyterians led by Rev James Benny of Morphett Vale did not join the union. When the states federated in 1901, the main Presbyterian denomination in each state federated, so Chalmers Church became part of the Presbyterian Church of Australia.

Chalmers Church amalgamated with the Flinders Street Presbyterian Church congregation in 1929, with the new name "Scots Church". The Flinders Street property was eventually sold in 1956, yielding funds to build on the western side of the North Terrace property, using bluestone facings from Flinders Street. The current organ and western stained glass also came from Flinders Street.

In 1977, the majority of the Presbyterian Church of Australia joined with the Methodist and most Congregational congregations to create the Uniting Church in Australia (UCA), the denomination of Scots Church today. Scots Church minister Rev Ian Tanner was elected as the first Moderator of the UCA Synod of South Australia, and then in 1985 became the fourth President of the Assembly of the Uniting Church in Australia

The Scots Church building was listed on the South Australian Heritage Register on 11 September 1986, and is the second-oldest church building in the City of Adelaide.

== People ==
Ministers

- John Gardner
- John Davidson 1870–1877;
- David Paton 1877–1906;
- Arthur John Wade 1907-1913;
- Thomas Tait 1914–1915; left for Sydney
- James Arthur Seymour 1916–1928; left for Canada
- Norman L. D. Webster 1929–1939;
- Ian B. Tanner 1963–1980

Organists

- Roy Mellish 1910–1919

Others

- Harriet Miller Davidson
