= List of listed buildings in Cromarty, Highland =

This is a list of listed buildings in the parish of Cromarty in Highland, Scotland.

== List ==
Name	Location	Date Listed	Grid Ref. (Note: Sometimes known as OSGB36, the grid reference (where provided) is based on the British national grid reference system used by the Ordnance Survey. • "Guide to National Grid". Ordnance Survey. • "Get-a-map". Ordnance Survey.)	Geo-coordinates	Notes	LB Number (Note: Historic Environment Scotland assign a unique alphanumeric identifier to each designated site in Scotland, for listed buildings this always begins with "LB", for example "LB12345".)	Image
George Street, Mary Ness				57°40′57″N 4°02′12″W	Category B	23678	Upload Photo
George Street, Lighthouse And Lighthouse Keeper's House				57°40′59″N 4°02′11″W	Category A	23680	Upload another image See more images
11 And 13 High Street				57°40′52″N 4°02′03″W	Category C(S)	23684	Upload Photo
Marine Terrace, Hemp Works				57°40′52″N 4°02′16″W	Category B	23702	Upload another image See more images
The Paye, Gaelic Chapel Graveyard And Graveyard Wall				57°40′45″N 4°02′00″W	Category B	23706	Upload another image See more images
Braehead Primary School And School House				57°40′55″N 4°02′03″W	Category B	23559	Upload another image See more images
Church Street, St Regulus' Episcopal Church				57°40′49″N 4°01′54″W	Category C(S)	23581	Upload another image
Church Street East Parish Churchyard And Churchyard Walls				57°40′44″N 4°01′44″W	Category B	23596	Upload Photo
Denny Road, Hadley				57°40′47″N 4°02′11″W	Category C(S)	23611	Upload Photo
Fishertown, 67 Big Vennel				57°40′48″N 4°01′48″W	Category C(S)	23631	Upload Photo
Fishertown, 58 Gordon's Lane				57°40′50″N 4°01′51″W	Category C(S)	23646	Upload Photo
Fishertown, 86 Little Vennel				57°40′48″N 4°01′47″W	Category C(S)	23653	Upload Photo
Fishertown, 89 Little Vennel				57°40′48″N 4°01′46″W	Category C(S)	23656	Upload Photo
1 Allan Square And Bank Street, Lusaka				57°40′54″N 4°02′10″W	Category C(S)	23525	Upload Photo
8, 10 And 12 Bank Street				57°40′52″N 4°02′07″W	Category C(S)	23545	Upload Photo
Cromarty House				57°40′36″N 4°01′32″W	Category A	1818	Upload another image
2 Forsyth Place				57°40′52″N 4°01′57″W	Category C(S)	23673	Upload Photo
3 Forsyth Place				57°40′52″N 4°01′57″W	Category C(S)	23674	Upload Photo
Cromarty Harbour				57°40′58″N 4°02′19″W	Category A	23700	Upload another image See more images
2 Barkly Street				57°40′54″N 4°02′08″W	Category B	23549	Upload Photo
4 Barkly Street				57°40′54″N 4°02′08″W	Category B	23550	Upload Photo
7 Braehead				57°40′54″N 4°02′00″W	Category C(S)	23556	Upload Photo
Burnside Place, Old Brewery				57°40′45″N 4°01′40″W	Category B	23568	Upload another image See more images
5 Church Street				57°40′51″N 4°01′57″W	Category B	23574	Upload Photo
19 Church Street				57°40′50″N 4°01′55″W	Category C(S)	23579	Upload Photo
Church Street, Drinking Fountain In Garden In Front Of Hugh Miller Institute				57°40′49″N 4°01′53″W	Category C(S)	23583	Upload another image
Church Street, Braefoot				57°40′48″N 4°01′53″W	Category C(S)	23584	Upload Photo
Church Street, Hugh Miller's Cottage				57°40′48″N 4°01′51″W	Category A	23588	Upload another image See more images
Church Street, East Parish Church				57°40′44″N 4°01′45″W	Category A	23595	Upload another image See more images
24 Church Street				57°40′51″N 4°01′54″W	Category B	23604	Upload Photo
1 And 5 Duke Street				57°40′55″N 4°02′10″W	Category B	23618	Upload Photo
Fishertown, 70 Big Vennel				57°40′48″N 4°01′47″W	Category C(S)	23634	Upload Photo
Fishertown, 35 Gordon's Lane				57°40′51″N 4°01′51″W	Category B	23644	Upload Photo
Fishertown, 59 Gordon's Lane				57°40′50″N 4°01′50″W	Category C(S)	23647	Upload Photo
Fishertown, 93 Little Vennel				57°40′49″N 4°01′45″W	Category C(S)	23657	Upload Photo
Fishertown, 46 Seabank (Off Shore Street)				57°40′52″N 4°01′53″W	Category C(S)	23660	Upload Photo
Allan Square And Bank Street, Sandstones				57°40′54″N 4°02′10″W	Category C(S)	23527	Upload Photo
6 And 8 Allan Square				57°40′53″N 4°02′10″W	Category C(S)	23533	Upload Photo
2 And 4 Allan Street				57°40′53″N 4°02′10″W	Category C(S)	23534	Upload Photo
29 Bank Street				57°40′55″N 4°02′10″W	Category B	23539	Upload Photo
Bank Street, The Old Bank House				57°40′54″N 4°02′11″W	Category B	23541	Upload Photo
Cromarty Mains Farmhouse				57°40′16″N 4°01′25″W	Category B	1821	Upload Photo
George Street, Frith View				57°40′57″N 4°02′12″W	Category B	23676	Upload Photo
High Street, Forsyth House (Former Manse) Gates And Gatepiers				57°40′53″N 4°02′00″W	Category B	23681	Upload another image See more images
3 And 5 High Street				57°40′52″N 4°02′02″W	Category C(S)	23682	Upload Photo
7 And 9 High Street				57°40′52″N 4°02′02″W	Category C(S)	23683	Upload Photo
Cromarty, High Street Townlands Barn				57°40′50″N 4°02′07″W	Category A	23695	Upload another image See more images
The Paye, Hugh Miller Monument				57°40′46″N 4°01′58″W	Category B	23707	Upload another image
Fishermen's Bothy Forsyth Place				57°40′54″N 4°01′55″W	Category C(S)	23709	Upload Photo
4 And 6 Bank Street				57°40′52″N 4°02′06″W	Category C(S)	23546	Upload Photo
Burnside Place, Church Hall				57°40′44″N 4°01′41″W	Category C(S)	23569	Upload another image
9 Church Street				57°40′51″N 4°01′56″W	Category B	23576	Upload Photo
Church Street, Mercat Cross (Within Grounds Of Courthouse)				57°40′48″N 4°01′52″W	Category B	23586	Upload Photo
Church Street, The Retreat				57°40′47″N 4°01′48″W	Category B	23590	Upload Photo
47 Church Street, Albion House				57°40′46″N 4°01′47″W	Category B	23592	Upload Photo
Church Street, Arms Cottage				57°40′48″N 4°01′50″W	Category C(S)	23602	Upload Photo
16 Church Street, Struy House				57°40′51″N 4°01′56″W	Category C(S)	23607	Upload Photo
2 Denny Road				57°40′47″N 4°02′11″W	Category C(S)	23612	Upload Photo
3 Denny Road (D Mcclean)				57°40′46″N 4°02′10″W	Category C(S)	23613	Upload Photo
Fishertown, 81 Big Vennel				57°40′49″N 4°01′47″W	Category C(S)	23632	Upload Photo
Fishertown, 66 Big Vennel				57°40′48″N 4°01′48″W	Category B	23635	Upload Photo
Fishertown, 87 Little Vennel				57°40′48″N 4°01′47″W	Category C(S)	23654	Upload Photo
Fishertown, 92 Little Vennel				57°40′48″N 4°01′44″W	Category C(S)	23658	Upload Photo
Allan Square, Bank Cottage				57°40′54″N 4°02′12″W	Category C(S)	23529	Upload Photo
5 Allan Square				57°40′54″N 4°02′12″W	Category C(S)	23530	Upload Photo
12 Allan Square				57°40′52″N 4°02′12″W	Category B	23531	Upload Photo
Bank Street, Ardyne				57°40′53″N 4°02′08″W	Category B	23536	Upload Photo
27 Bank Street, Beach Brae				57°40′55″N 4°02′10″W	Category B	23538	Upload Photo
20 Bank Street				57°40′53″N 4°02′08″W	Category C(S)	23542	Upload Photo
Fishertown, 4 Shore Street				57°40′53″N 4°01′56″W	Category C(S)	23663	Upload Photo
Fishertown, Shore Street Seabank House, Garden Walls And Gatepiers				57°40′52″N 4°01′52″W	Category B	23667	Upload Photo
Fishertown, 56 Shore Street				57°40′51″N 4°01′49″W	Category C(S)	23669	Upload Photo
37 High Street (Off High Street)				57°40′51″N 4°02′08″W	Category B	23689	Upload Photo
High Street, Laurel House				57°40′51″N 4°02′09″W	Category B	23690	Upload Photo
High Street, "Rurki"				57°40′49″N 4°02′15″W	Category C(S)	23692	Upload Photo
High Street "Mizpah"				57°40′48″N 4°02′14″W	Category C(S)	23694	Upload Photo
8 And 10 High Street				57°40′51″N 4°02′01″W	Category C(S)	23698	Upload Photo
2 and 4 High Street				57°40′51″N 4°01′59″W	Category B	23699	Upload another image See more images
5 And 6 Miller Lane				57°40′50″N 4°01′48″W	Category C(S)	23704	Upload Photo
The Paye, Paye House (Corner The Paye And Church Street				57°40′48″N 4°01′50″W	Category B	23705	Upload another image
6 And 8 Barkly Street, The Moorings				57°40′55″N 4°02′07″W	Category C(S)	23551	Upload Photo
2 Braehead				57°40′53″N 4°02′00″W	Category B	23553	Upload Photo
3 Braehead				57°40′53″N 4°02′00″W	Category B	23554	Upload Photo
Braehead, Alvara And Speybank Villa				57°40′58″N 4°02′08″W	Category B	23562	Upload Photo
11 Church Street				57°40′51″N 4°01′56″W	Category C(S)	23577	Upload Photo
21 Church Street				57°40′50″N 4°01′55″W	Category C(S)	23580	Upload Photo
49 Church Street				57°40′46″N 4°01′46″W	Category B	23593	Upload Photo
Church Street, St Anne's				57°40′47″N 4°01′45″W	Category B	23600	Upload Photo
18 Church Street, Victoria House				57°40′51″N 4°01′55″W	Category C(S)	23606	Upload Photo
Fishertown, 78 Big Vennel				57°40′49″N 4°01′46″W	Category C(S)	23633	Upload Photo
Fishertown 34 Gordon's Lane				57°40′51″N 4°01′52″W	Category B	23640	Upload Photo
Fishertown 38 Gordon's Lane ("Shoreline")				57°40′52″N 4°01′51″W	Category C(S)	23642	Upload Photo
Fishertown, 88 Little Vennel				57°40′48″N 4°01′46″W	Category C(S)	23655	Upload Photo
33 Bank Street				57°40′56″N 4°02′13″W	Category C(S)	23540	Upload Photo
16 And 18 Bank Street				57°40′52″N 4°02′08″W	Category B	23543	Upload Photo
Fishertown, 6 Shore Street				57°40′53″N 4°01′55″W	Category C(S)	23664	Upload Photo
Fishertown, Shore Street Moonfleet				57°40′52″N 4°01′53″W	Category C(S)	23666	Upload Photo
Fishertown, Adjoining Russell House: In Shore Street				57°40′51″N 4°01′50″W	Category C(S)	23668	Upload Photo
George Street, The Cliff				57°40′57″N 4°02′13″W	Category B	23677	Upload Photo
George Street, Reay House				57°40′58″N 4°02′10″W	Category B	23679	Upload Photo
25 And 27 High Street				57°40′51″N 4°02′06″W	Category B	23687	Upload Photo
Roseville, 29 High Street				57°40′51″N 4°02′07″W	Category B	23688	Upload Photo
Marine Terrace, The Royal Hotel				57°40′56″N 4°02′16″W	Category C(S)	23701	Upload another image See more images
High Street/Forsyth Place, K6 Telephone Kiosk				57°40′52″N 4°01′59″W	Category B	23708	Upload another image See more images
8 Braehead				57°40′54″N 4°02′01″W	Category C(S)	23557	Upload Photo
9 Braehead				57°40′54″N 4°02′01″W	Category C(S)	23558	Upload Photo
Burnside Place, Burnside Cottage				57°40′46″N 4°01′39″W	Category B	23567	Upload another image
Causeway, The Gardener's House And Garden Walls				57°40′43″N 4°01′33″W	Category A	23570	Upload another image See more images
13 And 15 Church Street				57°40′50″N 4°01′55″W	Category C(S)	23578	Upload Photo
Church Street Bellevue				57°40′47″N 4°01′50″W	Category B	23589	Upload another image
14 Church Street				57°40′51″N 4°01′56″W	Category C(S)	23608	Upload Photo
10 Church Street				57°40′51″N 4°01′56″W	Category C(S)	23609	Upload Photo
2 Church Street				57°40′52″N 4°01′57″W	Category C(S)	23610	Upload Photo
15 Denny Road				57°40′45″N 4°02′10″W	Category C(S)	23615	Upload Photo
7 Duke Street				57°40′55″N 4°02′10″W	Category B	23619	Upload Photo
11 Duke Street				57°40′56″N 4°02′09″W	Category B	23621	Upload Photo
6 Duke Street				57°40′56″N 4°02′11″W	Category B	23628	Upload Photo
2 Duke Street (And Bank Street) Kintail Cottage				57°40′56″N 4°02′12″W	Category B	23629	Upload Photo
Fishertown, 28/29 Gordon's Lane				57°40′50″N 4°01′53″W	Category C(S)	23637	Upload Photo
Fishertown, 62 Gordon's Lane				57°40′50″N 4°01′49″W	Category C(S)	23649	Upload Photo
3 Allan Square				57°40′54″N 4°02′10″W	Category B	23526	Upload Photo
14 Forsyth Place				57°40′52″N 4°01′55″W	Category B	23675	Upload Photo
19 And 21 High Street				57°40′51″N 4°02′05″W	Category C(S)	23685	Upload Photo
23 High Street				57°40′51″N 4°02′06″W	Category B	23686	Upload Photo
High Street "Fuinary"				57°40′48″N 4°02′15″W	Category B	23693	Upload Photo
High Street, Bank Of Scotland				57°40′51″N 4°02′05″W	Category B	23696	Upload Photo
3 And 3A Barkly Street				57°40′55″N 4°02′08″W	Category C(S)	23548	Upload Photo
Braehead, Servants' House To Barkly House				57°40′57″N 4°02′06″W	Category B	23560	Upload Photo
The Causeway, The Kennels				57°40′43″N 4°01′31″W	Category B	23571	Upload another image See more images
Church Street Hugh Miller Institute				57°40′49″N 4°01′54″W	Category C(S)	23582	Upload another image See more images
Church Street, Court House, Prison And Gatepiers				57°40′48″N 4°01′52″W	Category A	23585	Upload another image
Church Street, Wellington House				57°40′46″N 4°01′48″W	Category B	23591	Upload Photo
51 Church Street, Buzancy				57°40′45″N 4°01′45″W	Category B	23594	Upload Photo
Church Street, Lydia Cottage				57°40′48″N 4°01′49″W	Category C(S)	23601	Upload Photo
Church Street, Cromarty Arms				57°40′49″N 4°01′51″W	Category C(S)	23603	Upload Photo
15 Duke Street (The Haven)				57°40′57″N 4°02′09″W	Category B	23624	Upload Photo
12 Duke Street				57°40′56″N 4°02′10″W	Category B	23626	Upload Photo
Fishertown, Big Vennel The Creel				57°40′48″N 4°01′49″W	Category C(S)	23630	Upload Photo
Fishertown, 31 Gordon's Lane				57°40′50″N 4°01′52″W	Category C(S)	23638	Upload Photo
Fishertown, 60 Gordon's Lane				57°40′50″N 4°01′50″W	Category C(S)	23648	Upload Photo
Fishertown 63 Gordon's Lane				57°40′50″N 4°01′49″W	Category C(S)	23650	Upload Photo
Fishertown, 49 Seabank (Now In Grounds Of Seabank House)				57°40′51″N 4°01′52″W	Category C(S)	23662	Upload Photo
10 Allan Square Ivydene				57°40′53″N 4°02′11″W	Category B	23532	Upload Photo
Bank Street, Mount Eagle				57°40′52″N 4°02′05″W	Category B	23535	Upload Photo
Bank Street, Allanbank House, And 1 Barkly Street				57°40′54″N 4°02′08″W	Category B	23537	Upload Photo
Cromarty House Servants' Tunnel				57°40′37″N 4°01′29″W	Category B	1819	Upload Photo
Fishertown, Shore Street Stornoway House				57°40′52″N 4°01′54″W	Category C(S)	23665	Upload Photo
Fishertown, 99 Shore Street				57°40′47″N 4°01′42″W	Category B	23671	Upload Photo
1 Forsyth Place (Gable And Shop Entrance To Church Street)				57°40′52″N 4°01′58″W	Category B	23672	Upload Photo
1 Miller Lane				57°40′49″N 4°01′50″W	Category C(S)	23703	Upload Photo
Barkly Street, Fire Station				57°40′55″N 4°02′08″W	Category C(S)	23547	Upload Photo
1 Braehead				57°40′53″N 4°01′58″W	Category B	23552	Upload Photo
Braehead, Barkly House				57°40′57″N 4°02′07″W	Category B	23561	Upload Photo
The Causeway, Clunes Cottage				57°40′44″N 4°01′30″W	Category B	23572	Upload Photo
The Causeway, Clunes House				57°40′45″N 4°01′31″W	Category B	23573	Upload Photo
7 Church Street				57°40′51″N 4°01′57″W	Category B	23575	Upload Photo
Church Street, Miller House				57°40′48″N 4°01′51″W	Category A	23587	Upload Photo
50 Church Street, The Cobbles				57°40′46″N 4°01′45″W	Category C(S)	23597	Upload Photo
60 Church Street				57°40′46″N 4°01′45″W	Category C(S)	23599	Upload Photo
22 Church Street				57°40′51″N 4°01′55″W	Category B	23605	Upload Photo
13 Denny Road (Miss Cameron)				57°40′46″N 4°02′10″W	Category C(S)	23614	Upload Photo
14 Duke Street				57°40′57″N 4°02′09″W	Category B	23625	Upload Photo
Fishertown, 27 Gordon's Lane				57°40′50″N 4°01′53″W	Category C(S)	23636	Upload Photo
Fishertown, 32 Gordon's Lane				57°40′50″N 4°01′52″W	Category C(S)	23639	Upload Photo
Fishertown, Russell House 55 Gordon's Lane				57°40′51″N 4°01′50″W	Category B	23645	Upload Photo
14 Bank Street				57°40′52″N 4°02′08″W	Category C(S)	23544	Upload Photo
Fishertown, Shore Street Weatherglass House				57°40′50″N 4°01′47″W	Category C(S)	23670	Upload Photo
High Street, Denoon Villa (Corner High Street/Denoon Place)				57°40′50″N 4°02′11″W	Category C(S)	23691	Upload Photo
12 High Street, Sidney House				57°40′51″N 4°02′02″W	Category C(S)	23697	Upload Photo
5 Braehead				57°40′54″N 4°02′00″W	Category C(S)	23555	Upload Photo
Braehead, Braehead Cottage				57°40′54″N 4°01′59″W	Category C(S)	23563	Upload Photo
Braehead, Icehouse				57°40′36″N 4°01′32″W	Category C(S)	23564	Upload another image See more images
Burnside Place, Burnside				57°40′45″N 4°01′43″W	Category B	23565	Upload Photo
Burnside Place, Farndale				57°40′45″N 4°01′41″W	Category B	23566	Upload Photo
62 Church Street				57°40′46″N 4°01′45″W	Category B	23598	Upload Photo
Denny Road, Lodge To Cromarty House And Gatepiers				57°40′32″N 4°02′10″W	Category C(S)	23616	Upload Photo
1914-1918 and 1939-45 War Memorial, Off Denny Road				57°40′44″N 4°02′05″W	Category C(S)	23617	Upload another image
9 Duke Street, York House				57°40′56″N 4°02′09″W	Category B	23620	Upload Photo
13 Duke Street				57°40′56″N 4°02′08″W	Category B	23622	Upload Photo
18 Duke Street				57°40′57″N 4°02′08″W	Category B	23623	Upload Photo
8 Duke Street				57°40′56″N 4°02′11″W	Category B	23627	Upload Photo
Fishertown, 36 Gordon's Lane				57°40′51″N 4°01′51″W	Category C(S)	23641	Upload Photo
Fishertown, 39 Gordon's Lane				57°40′51″N 4°01′51″W	Category C(S)	23643	Upload Photo
Fishertown, 65 Gordon's Lane				57°40′48″N 4°01′49″W	Category C(S)	23651	Upload Photo
Fishertown, 64 Gordon's Lane				57°40′50″N 4°01′48″W	Category C(S)	23652	Upload Photo
Fishertown, 45 Seabank (Off Shore Street)				57°40′52″N 4°01′53″W	Category C(S)	23659	Upload Photo
Fishertown, 47 Seabank				57°40′51″N 4°01′52″W	Category C(S)	23661	Upload Photo
Allan Square Bank Cottage, Gatepiers				57°40′54″N 4°02′12″W	Category B	23528	Upload Photo
Cromarty House Stables				57°40′31″N 4°01′27″W	Category A	1820	Upload another image

== Key ==
The scheme for classifying buildings in Scotland is:

- Category A: "buildings of national or international importance, either architectural or historic; or fine, little-altered examples of some particular period, style or building type."
- Category B: "buildings of regional or more than local importance; or major examples of some particular period, style or building type, which may have been altered."
- Category C: "buildings of local importance; lesser examples of any period, style, or building type, as originally constructed or moderately altered; and simple traditional buildings which group well with other listed buildings."

In March 2016 there were 47,288 listed buildings in Scotland. Of these, 8% were Category A, and 50% were Category B, with the remaining 42% being Category C.

== See also ==
- List of listed buildings in Highland
