= Lydia Mackenzie Falconer Miller =

Scottish children's writer, editor (1812-1876)

- Miller in 1835
- Born: Lydia Mackenzie Falconer; 1812; Scotland
- Died: 11 March 1876 (aged 63–64); Lochinver, Sutherland
- Education: Inverness Academy
- Occupation: Children's author
- Spouse: Hugh Miller
- Children: 4 including Harriet Miller Davidson
- Writing career
- Pen name: Harriett Myrtle
- Language: English

Lydia Mackenzie Falconer Miller or Harriet Myrtle (1812 – 11 March 1876) was a Scottish children's writer.

== Biography ==
She was born Lydia Mackenzie Falconer to Elizabeth Lydia McLeod (d. 1865), a schoolteacher, and her husband, an Inverness-based merchant, William Fraser (1789–1828). She was baptised in 1812. After her father's business failed her mother's family helped pay for her education. She was schooled at Inverness Academy and later in Edinburgh, where she lodged with the musician George Thomson, a friend of the poet Robert Burns.

After some time in England she returned to Scotland, setting up a small school in Cromarty, where her family then lived. In Cromarty she met Hugh Miller. Both were well read and intelligent; she had lived in Edinburgh's literary society. Her family objected but they were engaged in 1832 and they married on 7 January 1837. Together they had four surviving children. Her husband was appointed to manage the periodical The Witness in Edinburgh and Lydia assisted and wrote contributions for the publication.

Under the pseudonym Mrs Harriet Myrtle, she wrote about 20 educational and moral stories for children which were often adventurous and light-hearted.

In 1847 she anonymously published her only adult novel, Passages in the Life of an English Heiress, or, Recollections of Disruption Times in Scotland, the background drawn from her own and her husband's upbringing and their discussions. It was unsuccessful but considered a brave attempt to write fiction from an evangelical perspective at a time when most Scottish evangelical Presbyterians considered the fiction to be corrupting and intrinsically immoral.

Her husband, unwell and depressed, possibly fearful of insanity, shot himself at their home in Edinburgh on 24 December 1856. Their daughter, the poet and novelist was said to have been affected by this the rest of her life. She completed the publication of her husband's unfinished works, and assisted Peter Bayne write her husband's biography. In widowhood, she was financially assisted by a civil list pension that was given to her in 1857. She moved to Inverness in 1863 where she continued to write for children.

Lydia Miller died on 11 March 1876, at her son-in-law's manse at Lochinver, Sutherland, and was buried on 20 March beside her husband in the Grange cemetery in Edinburgh.

== Selected works ==
- Adventure of a Kite
- The water lily
- Passages in the life of an English heiress : or, Recollections of disruption times in Scotland. (1847)
- Two dear friends
- The duck house
- Home and its pleasures : simple stories for young people
- Bertha and the bird
- Little Amy's birthday
- Going to the cottage
- A story-book of country scenes
- The little foundling : and other tales
- The man of snow and other tales
- Amusing tales for young people
- A story book of the seasons: Spring
