= William Anderson (Scottish writer) =

Scottish miscellaneous writer

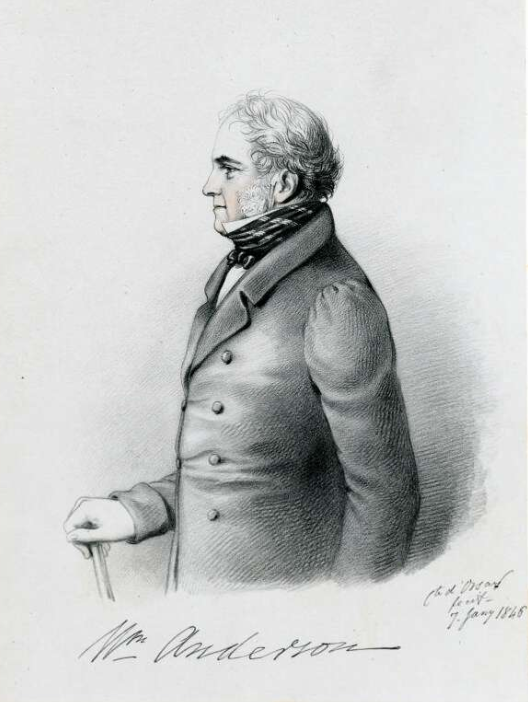
- William Anderson by Alfred d'Orsay

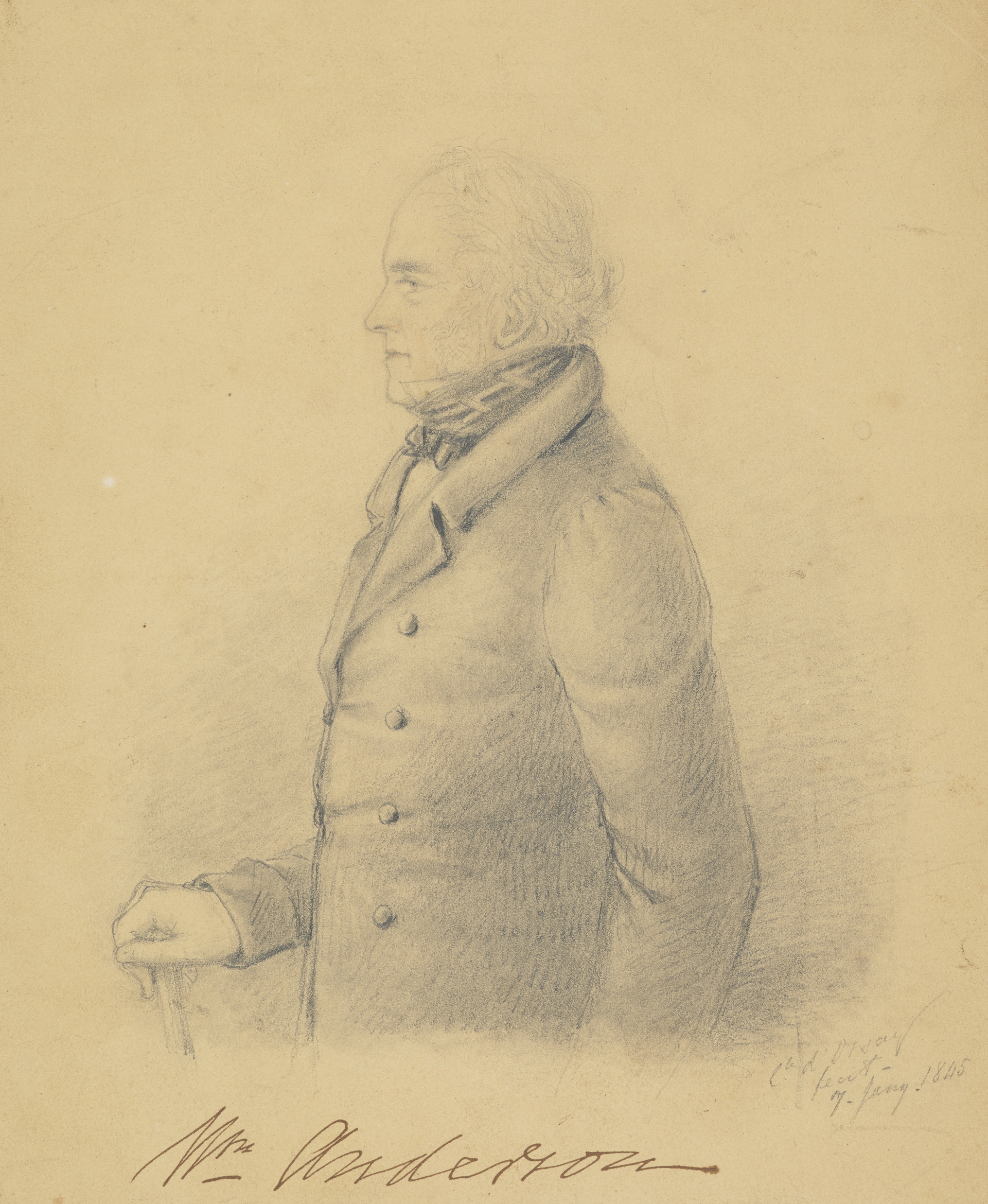
William-anderson-1805-1866

William Anderson (1805–1866) was a Scottish miscellaneous writer in the departments of history, biography, and science. He was born at Edinburgh and educated there, and placed in a lawyer's office. As an author he published Poetical Aspirations; Landscape Lyrics; Popular Scottish Biography; Treasury of Nature, Science, and Art and an extensive work widely known as The Scottish Nation. He also assisted for some time in managing Aberdeen Journal, Witness, and Daily Mail newspapers. He died, aged 61.

== Biography ==
Anderson was born in Edinburgh 10 December 1805. His father was supervisor of excise at Oban, and his mother the daughter of John Williams, author of the 'Natural History of the Mineral Kingdom.' He was thus a younger brother of John Anderson (genealogist, 1789–1832), the historian of the house of Hamilton. After receiving a good education in Edinburgh he became clerk to a Leith merchant, but subsequently entered a lawyer's office in Edinburgh. At an early period he began to contribute to the newspapers, and in 1830 published a volume of verse, entitled 'Poetical Aspirations,’ which reached a second edition in 1833. This was followed by a volume of prose and verse, entitled 'Odd Sketches.' After a short residence in London in 1831 he obtained a situation on the 'Aberdeen Journal.'

In 1836 he returned to London, where he formed a rather extensive literary connection, and in 1839 brought out the 'Gift of all Nations,’ an annual which numbered among its contributors Thomas Campbell, Sheridan Knowles, the Countess of Blessington, and Miss Pardoe. In the same year he also published 'Landscape Lyrics,’ which reached a second edition in 1854. In 1842 he became editor of the 'Western Watchman,’ a weekly newspaper published at Ayr; in 1844 he was chosen subeditor of the ‘Edinburgh Witness,’ which, although the articles of Hugh Miller had secured it a wide circulation, had hitherto been subedited in a very perfunctory manner; and in 1845 he became the chief subeditor of the ‘Glasgow Daily Mail,’ the first daily newspaper published in Scotland.

On account of the serious effects on his health of severe night labour, he was two years afterwards compelled for a time to abandon literary work, and he never formed any subsequent connection with a newspaper. With the exception of a volume of 'Poems' published in 1845, and the 'Young Voyager,’ 1855, a poem descriptive of the search after Sir John Franklin, and intended for juvenile readers, the remaining works of Anderson are of the nature chiefly of popular compilations. They include an edition of the 'Works of Lord Byron,’ with a life and notes, 1850; the 'Poems and Songs of R. Gilfillan,’ with a memoir, 1851; and a 'Treasury' series, embracing the 'Treasury of Discovery,’ 1853; of the 'Animal World,’ 1854; of 'Manners,’ 1855; of 'History,’ 1856; and of 'Nature,’ 1857. Of a somewhat higher character than these compilations are the 'Scottish Nation,’ 1859–63, an expansion of his 'Popular Scottish Biography' published in 1842; and 'Genealogy and Surnames,’ 1865. The 'Scottish Nation,’ though diffuse and ill arranged, displays great industry and a minute acquaintance with Scottish family history; while 'Genealogy and Surnames,’ amid much that is commonplace, contains some curious information not easily accessible elsewhere.

He died suddenly at London 2 August 1866.

== Works ==
- Poetical Aspirations 1830
- Landscape Lyrics 1839
- Popular Scottish Biography
- Treasury of Nature, Science, and Art
- The Scottish Nation 1863
