= John Davidson (minister) =

John Davidson (1834 – 22 July 1881) was a Presbyterian minister and academic.

== Life ==
Davidson was born in Kinghorn, Fife, Scotland, and was educated for the ministry. Having gained a considerable reputation as a preacher, he was invited to assume the pastorate of Chalmers Church in Adelaide. Accepting the call, he arrived in South Australia in June 1870, and was connected with Chalmers Church until 1877, when he associated himself with the Adelaide Union College. When Sir Walter Watson Hughes agreed to endow the University of Adelaide with £20,000 for two professorships, he stipulated that Davidson should fill the first chair of English Language and Literature and Mental and Moral Philosophy. Accordingly, when the university was constituted, in 1874, Davidson assumed the duties of the position. He died on 22 July 1881.

== Family ==
Davidson left a widow Harriet (1839–1883), the daughter of Hugh Miller the geologist, known as a poet and writer; she died at Adelaide in December 1883. She was the author of Isabel Jardine's History (1867), Christian Osborn's Friends (1869), and contributed to the Adelaide newspapers and Chambers's Journal.
