= Harriet Miller Davidson =

Scottish poet and novelist

- Born: 25 November 1839; Cromarty, Scotland
- Died: 21 December 1883 (aged 44); Adelaide, South Australia
- Education: Edinburgh and London
- Known for: Poet, Novelist
- Parent(s): Hugh Miller and Lydia Mackenzie Falconer Miller

Harriet Miller Davidson (25 November 1839 – 21 December 1883) was a Scottish poet and novelist.

== Life ==
Davidson was born in Cromarty in 1839. She was the daughter of Lydia Mackenzie Falconer Miller, a writer of children's books and Hugh Miller, a self-taught geologist. Davidson was said to have been affected for the rest of her life by her father's suicide on 24 December 1856.

She met her husband, John Davidson, while in Europe and she married the Presbyterian minister in 1860. They emigrated to Adelaide in 1870 after her husband was made minister at Chalmers Church in the city. When the University of Adelaide was created her husband was chosen as the first Hughes professor of English literature although it was argued that his wife was just as well qualified.

She wrote Isabel Jardine's History which was published by the Scottish Temperance League in 1867. She published poems and stories in both countries about temperance and of daughters left by inspirational fathers. She wrote Christian Osborn's Friends in 1869 as well as contributing poems and stories to the local newspapers and Chambers's Journal.

Davidson ran a small school at her home in Adelaide. She visited Scotland in 1877 but died in Adelaide in 1883 having become an invalid. After she died her four daughters moved back to Britain. One of the daughters married in 1890 to become Lydia Falconer Fraser Miller Middleton.

== Bibliography ==
=== Novels ===
- A Man of Genius (1872)
- The Hamiltons : A Story of Australian Life (1878)

=== Young adult novels ===
- Isobel Jardine's History (1867)
- Christian Osborne's Friends (1870)
- The Child of the Sun : A Tale for Children (1881)
- Sir Gilbert's Children (1884)
