= Cromarty Courthouse =

Municipal building in Cromarty, Scotland

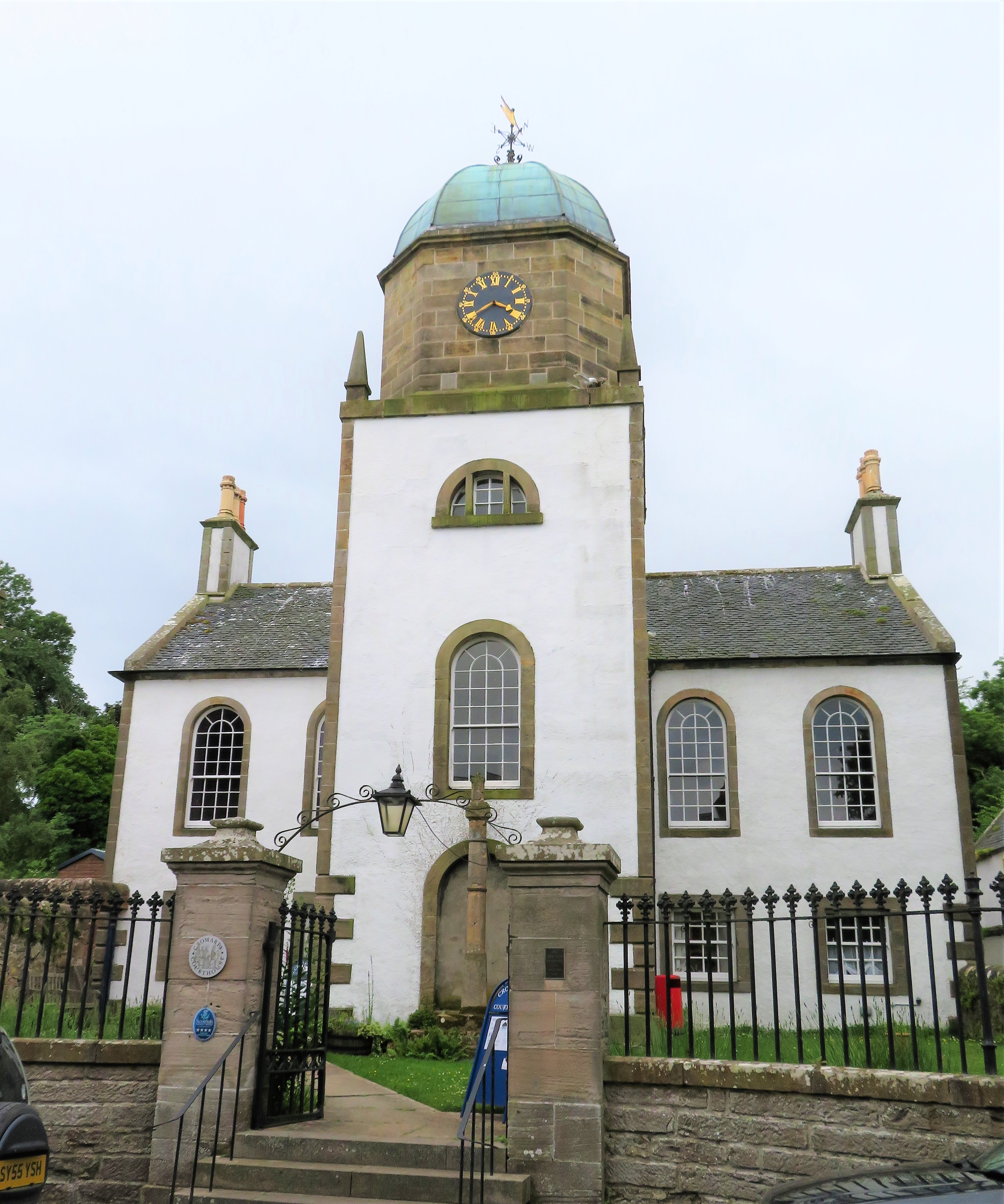
- Cromarty Courthouse

- Shown in Highland
- 57.6800°N 4.0312°W
- Location: Church Street, Cromarty

History
- Built: 1773

Site notes
- Architectural style: Scottish medieval style

Listed Building – Category A
- Official name: Cromarty Court House Museum including prison, gatepiers, boundary wall and railings, Church Street, Cromarty
- Designated: 25 March 1971
- Reference no.: LB23585

Cromarty Courthouse, formerly Cromarty Town House, is a municipal building in Church Street, Cromarty, in the Highland area of Scotland. The structure, which is used as a museum, is a Category A listed building.

== History ==
The first municipal building in Cromarty was an ancient tolbooth located on the east side of The Causeway. By the 1770s, the building had become dilapidated, and the future member of parliament for Tain Burghs, George Ross of Pitkerrie, launched an initiative to erect several new structures in the town including a new town house.

The new building was designed in the Scottish medieval style, built in coursed rubble masonry with a cement render finish and was completed in spring 1773. It was known at that time as the Cromarty Town House. The design involved a symmetrical main frontage of five bays facing onto Church Street. The central bay, which was projected forward, was formed by a three-stage tower with a round headed doorway with an architrave in the first stage, a round headed sash window in the second stage and a Diocletian window in the third stage; the tower was surmounted by an octagonal cupola, a dome and a weather vane. The outer bays were fenestrated by square windows on the ground floor and by round headed windows on the first floor. A clock, designed and manufactured by John Ross of Tain, was installed in the cupola in 1782. Internally, the principal room was the courtroom on the first floor.

Following the disruption of 1843, when a large group of evangelical ministers broke away from the Church of Scotland to form the Free Church of Scotland, an unpopular new priest was appointed to the Parish of Resolis. A milkmaid, Margaret Cameron, who had taken part in demonstrations against this new appointment, was imprisoned in the town house and, in September 1843, a group of people from Resolis caused a local sensation by breaking into the town house and freeing her. Improvements, including a new prisoner cell block to the rear of the town house, were completed to a design by Thomas Brown in 1847.

As well as serving as a judicial venue, the building also served as the meeting place of the burgh council. The building continued to serve in that capacity for much of the 20th century, but ceased to be the local seat of government when the enlarged Ross and Cromarty District Council was formed at Dingwall in 1975. The building was restored with the support of Ross and Cromarty District Council in the early 1990s and re-opened as the Cromarty Courthouse Museum in 1991. Artefacts placed on display in the museum included items relating to the life of the writer and translator, Sir Thomas Urquhart.

== See also ==
- List of listed buildings in Cromarty, Highland
- List of Category A listed buildings in Highland
