= William Forsyth (merchant) =

William Forsyth (1722–1800) was a Scottish merchant.

== Early life ==
Forsyth was born in 1722 at Cromarty, where his father, a native of Morayshire, had settled as a shopkeeper. Forsyth spent some time in a London counting-house, but returned home when his father died suddenly at the early age of seventeen.

== Career ==
The herring had deserted the coast, and there was no trade but Forsyth came up with a bold idea. He formed a depôt of supplies for all the country round. He brought flax and other commodities from Holland. He traded with Leith and London, and was the first to introduce coal (about 1770), called by the country people 'black stones.' On the suggestion of his old schoolfellow, Dr. Hossack of Greenwich, he started the manufacture of kelp. He also employed many of the people in their own homes in spinning and weaving in connection with the British Linen Company, of which he was the first agent in the north, and encouraged fishing and farming industries.

For more than thirty years he was the only magistrate in the place. The general respect of the neighbourhood was shown by his popular title as 'the maister.' Forsyth helped many including Charles Grant, chairman of the East India Company, and M.P. for Inverness.

== Death ==
Forsyth died at Cromarty 30 January 1800.

== Personal life ==
He was twice married, first to Margaret Russell, who died within a year in childbirth, and next, after eleven years, to Elizabeth Grant, daughter of the Rev. Patrick Grant of Nigg, Ross-shire. He had nine children, only three of whom survived him. He and his family were large benefactors to Cromarty. Hugh Miller, himself a native of Cromarty, says: 'He was one of nature's noblemen; and the sincere homage of the better feelings is an honour reserved exclusively to the order to which he belonged.' He also says of the inscription on his gravestone in Cromarty churchyard, that its 'rare merit is to be at once highly eulogistic and strictly true.'
