= Witness (religious newspaper) =

Evangelical newspaper established in 1840

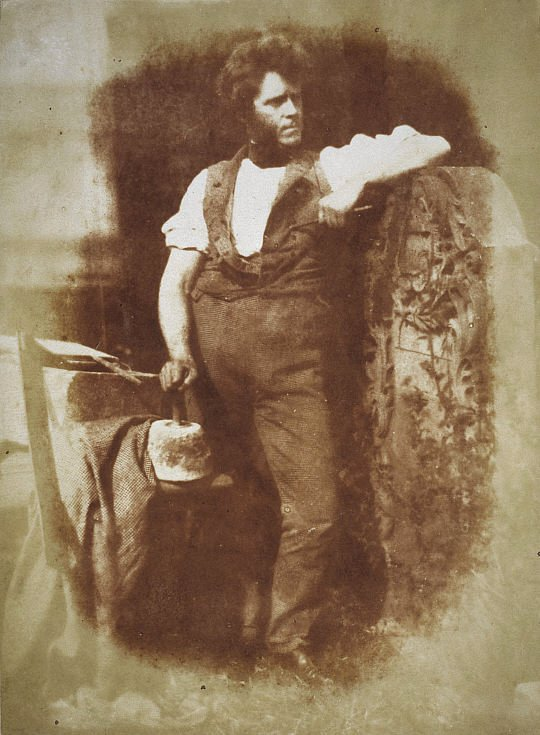
Hugh Miller -editor

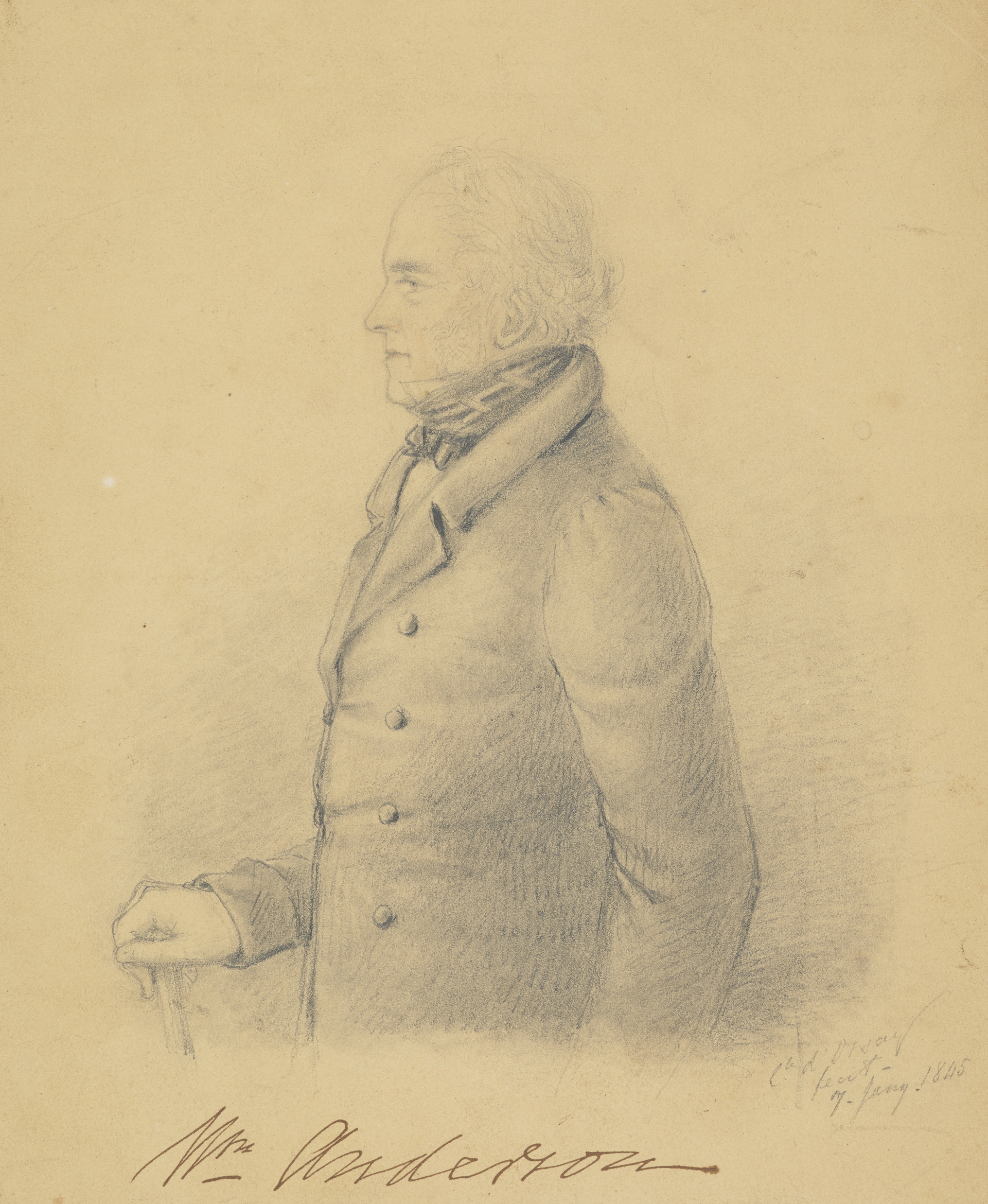
William Anderson - sub editor

Witness was an evangelical newspaper established in 1840 by Scottish geologist and writer Hugh Miller. Robert Candlish was instrumental in establishing Miller as the editor. He continued to edit the paper at an office on the Royal Mile in Edinburgh until his suicide in December 1856. He was the principal contributor to the publication, averaging over 10,000 words a week. William Anderson was sub-editor as was James Aitken Wylie.
