= James Thomson (surgeon) =

Crimean War-era British Army surgeon

DR James Thomson
- Born: 8 March 1823; Cromarty, Scotland
- Died: 5 October 1854 (aged 31); Balaklava

James Thomson (8 March 1823-5 October 1854) was a surgeon with the 44th (East Essex) Regiment Of Foot. He is best known for treating Russian soldiers in the Battle of the Alma during the Crimean War.

== Early life ==
James Thomson was born on 8 March 1823 in Cromarty, Scotland. He qualified as a Doctor Of Medicine at St Andrews University in 1844.

== Military career ==
In 1848 Thomson joined the 7th Dragoon Guards before being transferred to the reserve battalion of the 44th (East Essex) Regiment Of Foot.

=== Malta ===
In 1850 Thomson's battalion was deployed to Malta. The Battalion arrived in the midst of a Cholera epidemic. All Army Surgeons except Thomson succumbed to the disease. Thomson's action in preventing the spread of the disease gained him the praise of his commander in chief. Whilst in Malta the reserve and main battalions were amalgamated.

After a short stint in Gibraltar the 44th Foot were deployed to Crimea in 1854.

=== The Battle of the Alma ===
Thomson was put in charge of treating injured Russian soldiers in British captivity by Lord Raglan, commander of all British Forces in Crimea. As British forces left the site of the Battle, James and his batman stayed behind for several days tending to the approximately 700 wounded Russians; He would nurse 340 of them back to health.

He was then taken to Balaklava to be treated for cholera where he died on 5 October 1854 aged 31.

== Memorials ==
A memorial to James Thomson can be found at Castlehill Gardens in Forres, Moray. The 50-foot-tall Obelisk was erected in 1857. A Blue plaque was erected on the High Street in Cromarty by the Cromarty Community Council at James' childhood home.
