= Hughmillerites =

Hughmillerites Temporal range: Kimmeridgian–Valanginian

Scientific classification
- Kingdom: Plantae
- Division: Pinophyta
- Class: Pinopsida
- Order: Pinales
- Family: Cupressaceae
- Genus: Hughmillerites Rothwell et al., (2011).

Species
- H. juddii (Rothwell et al., 2011).; H. vancouverensis (Atkinson et al., 2014).; Synonymn: Conites juddii

Extinct genus of conifers

Hughmillerites is a fossil cypress, found in the Late Jurassic of Scotland and Early Cretaceous of Canada.

== Etymology ==
The genus name Hughmillerites refers to the well-known Scottish geologist, writer and stonemason, Hugh Miller (1802-1856), who found the original specimen and many others at Eathie, on the Black Isle in Scotland. The genus was erected in 2014 for a specimen originally named Conites juddii, and the species name juddii was retained. It honours John Wesley Judd (1879 – 1914). The second species, M. vancouverensis is named for Vancouver Island, where the fossils were collected.

== Description ==
Hughmillerites is known from fossil cones approximately 2–5 cm in length. They were preserved in the Kimmeridge Clay Formation (Upper Jurassic) in Scotland, and the Longarm Formation (Valanginian, Early Cretaceous) in Apple Bay on Vancouver Island, Canada.

== Significance ==
Understanding the origin and evolution of conifers is important for palaeontologists, because they comprise an important part of ecosystems in the past and present. Fossils of Hughmillerites and the closely related Hubbardiastrobus are important for understanding the evolution of the structure of conifer cones. They have intermediate shape of cone scales between early forms and later ones, charting changes in the group through time.

Most of the fossils from Eathie (where Hughmillerites was originally found) were collected by the famous Scottish geologist and writer, Hugh Miller. His collection is mainly held at the National Museum of Scotland, including the holotype of Hughmillerites.
