= Hugh Miller =

Scottish geologist, writer and folklorist (1802-1856)

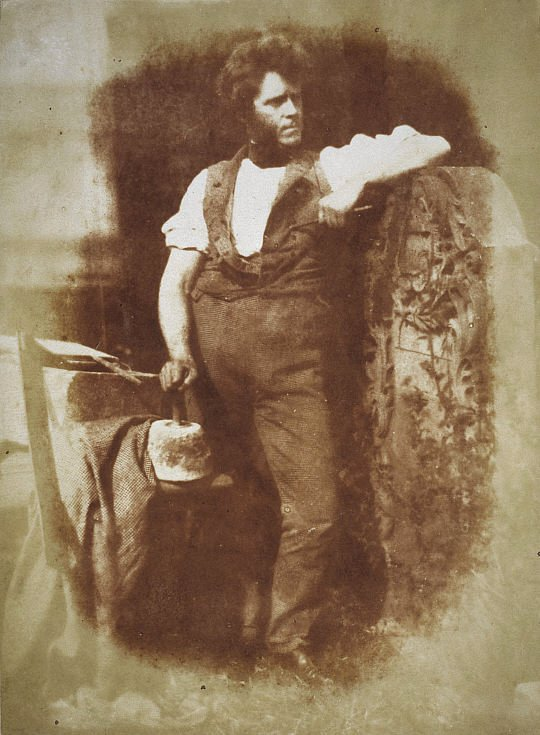
- Miller photographed by Hill & Adamson (c. 1843–1847)
- Born: 10 October 1802; Cromarty, Scotland
- Died: 24 December 1856 (aged 54); Portobello, Edinburgh
- Spouse: Lydia Mackenzie Falconer Miller
- Scientific career
- Fields: geology

Hugh Miller (10 October 1802 – 24 December 1856) was a Scottish geologist, writer and folklorist.

== Life and work ==
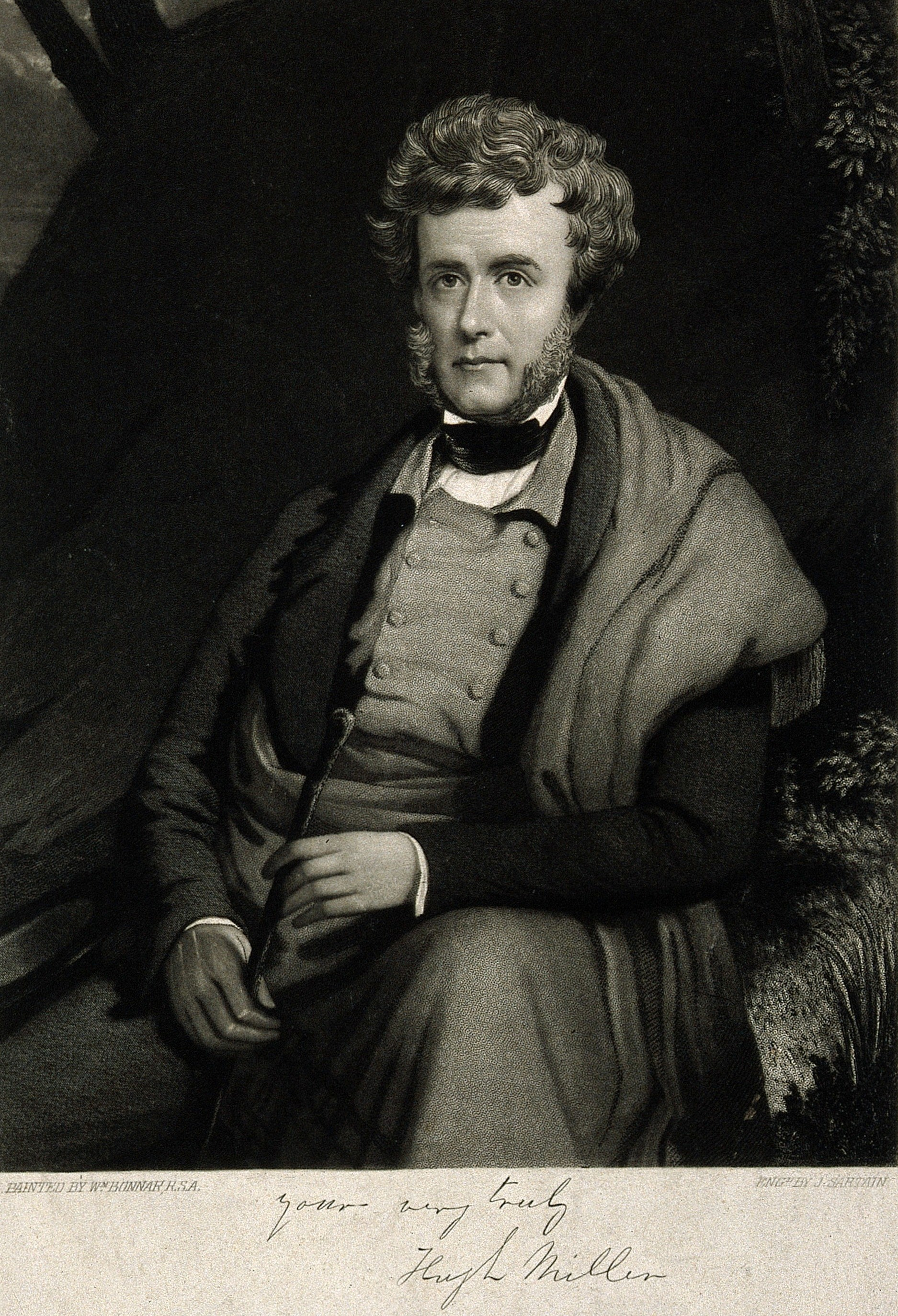
Hugh Miller

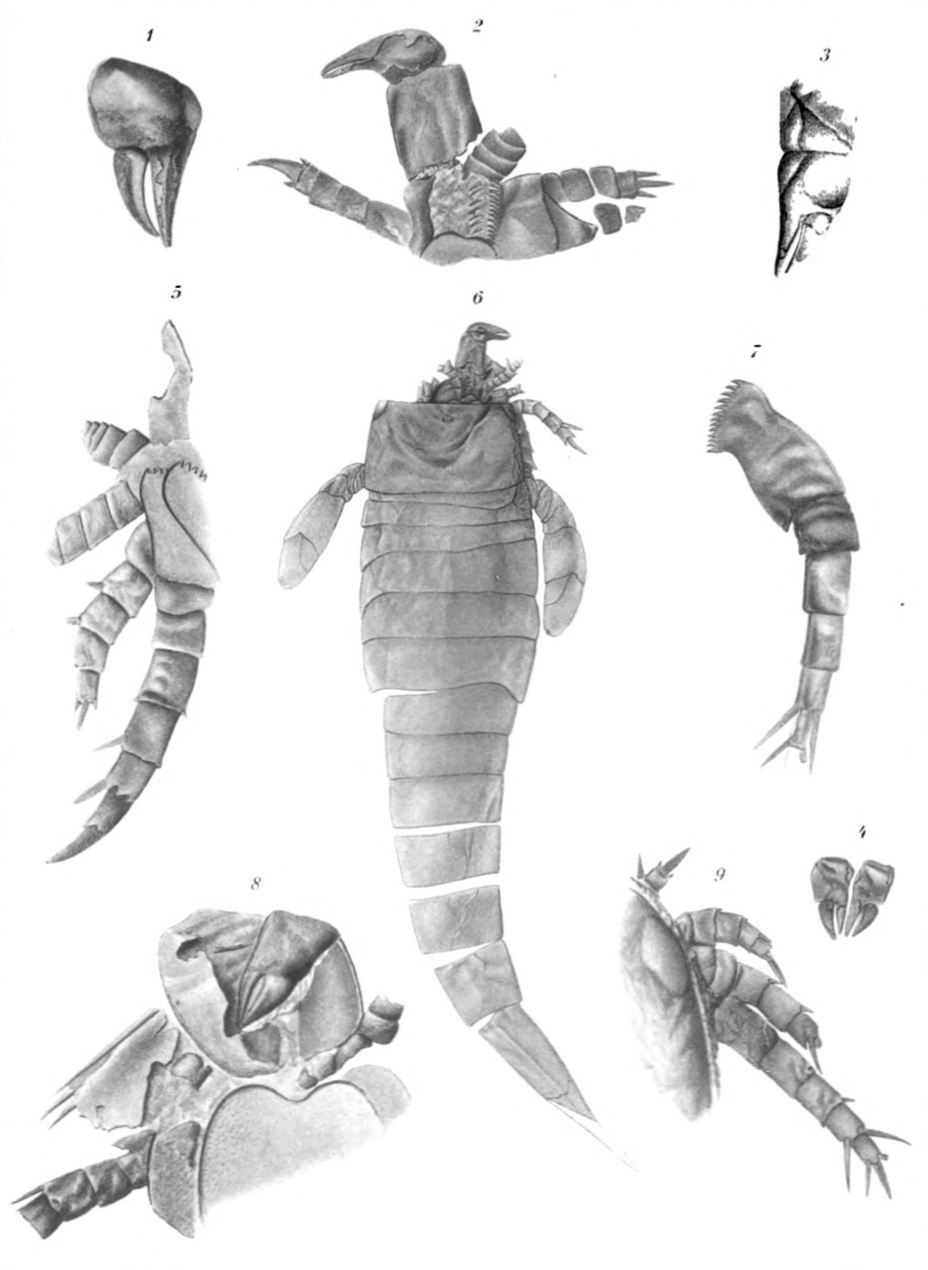
Fossils of Hughmilleria socialis

Miller was born in Cromarty, the first of three children of Harriet Wright (bap. 1780, d. 1863) and Hugh Miller (bap. 1754, d. 1807), a shipmaster in the coasting trade. Both parents were from trading and artisan families in Cromarty. His father died in a shipwreck in 1807, and he was brought up by his mother and uncles. He was educated in a parish school where he reportedly showed a love of reading. It was at this school that Miller was involved in an altercation with an Afro-Caribbean classmate in which he stabbed his thigh. Miller was subsequently expelled from the school following an unrelated incident. At 17 he was apprenticed to a stonemason, and his work in quarries, together with walks along the local shoreline, led him to the study of geology. In 1829 he published a volume of poems, and soon afterwards became involved in political and religious controversies, first connected to the Reform Bill, and then with the division in the Church of Scotland which led to the Disruption of 1843.

In 1834 he became accountant in one of the local banks, and in the next year brought out his Scenes and Legends in the North of Scotland. In 1837 he married the children's author Lydia Mackenzie Falconer Fraser. In 1840 the popular party in the Church, with which he had been associated, started a newspaper, the Witness, and Miller was called to be editor in Edinburgh, a position which he retained until the end of his life. He was an influential writer and speaker in the early Free Church. From 1846 he was joined at "The Witness" by Rev James Aitken Wylie.

Among his geological works are The Old Red Sandstone (1841), Footprints of the Creator (1850), The Testimony of the Rocks (1857), Sketch-book of Popular Geology. Of these books, perhaps The Old Red Sandstone was the best known. The Old Red Sandstone is still a term used to collectively describe sedimentary rocks deposited as a result of the Caledonian orogeny in the late Silurian, Devonian and earliest part of the Carboniferous period.

Miller held that the Earth was of great age, and that it had been inhabited by many species which had come into being and gone extinct, and that these species were homologous; although he believed the succession of species showed progress over time, he did not believe that later species were descended from earlier ones. He denied the Epicurean theory that new species occasionally budded from the soil, and the Lamarckian theory of development of species, as lacking evidence. He argued that all this showed the direct action of a benevolent Creator, as attested in the Bible – the similarities of species are manifestations of types in the Divine Mind; he accepted the view of Thomas Chalmers that Genesis begins with an account of geological periods, and does not mean that each of them is a day; Noah's Flood was a limited subsidence of the Middle East. Geology, to Miller, offered a better version of the argument from design than William Paley could provide, and answered the objections of sceptics, by showing that living species did not arise by chance or by impersonal law.

In a biographical review about him, he was recognized as an exceptional person by Sir David Brewster, who said of him:

"Mr. Miller is one of the few individuals in the history of Scottish science who have raised themselves above the labors of an humble profession, by the force of their genius and the excellence of their character, to a comparatively high place in the social scale."

— Brewster (1851)

In 2022, a historic ring was discovered on the beach of Gordon's Bay, South Africa, by Cornell Swart using a metal detector. The ring features an outer engraving that reads "In memory of," while the inner inscription commemorates "Hugh Miller, Born Oct 10, 1802, Died Dec 24, 1856."

Swart returned the artifact to Miller's descendants, and it is now preserved and exhibited in the museum at Miller's family home in Scotland.

== Illness and death ==
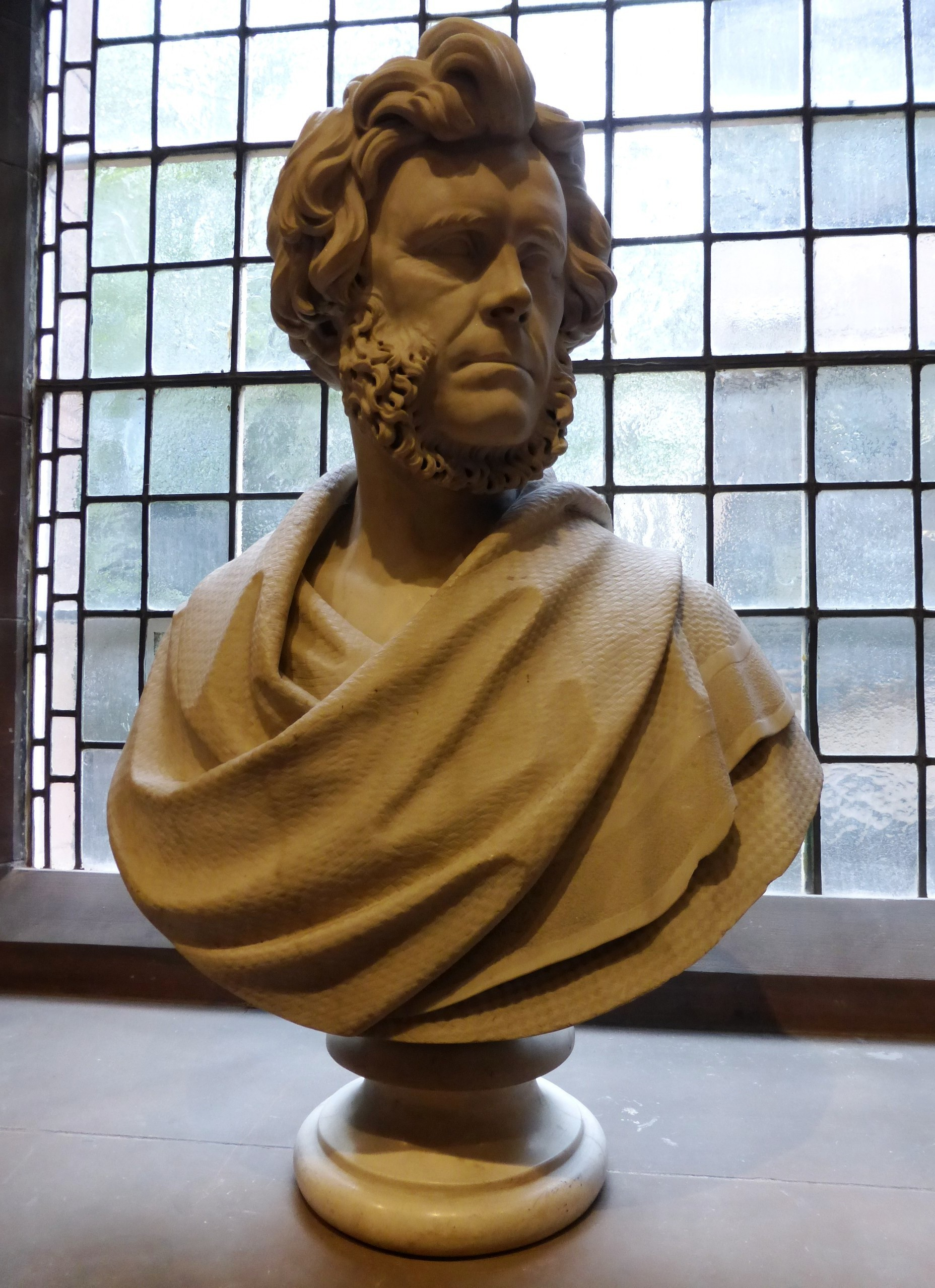
Bust of Miller by William Brodie in the Scottish National Portrait Gallery

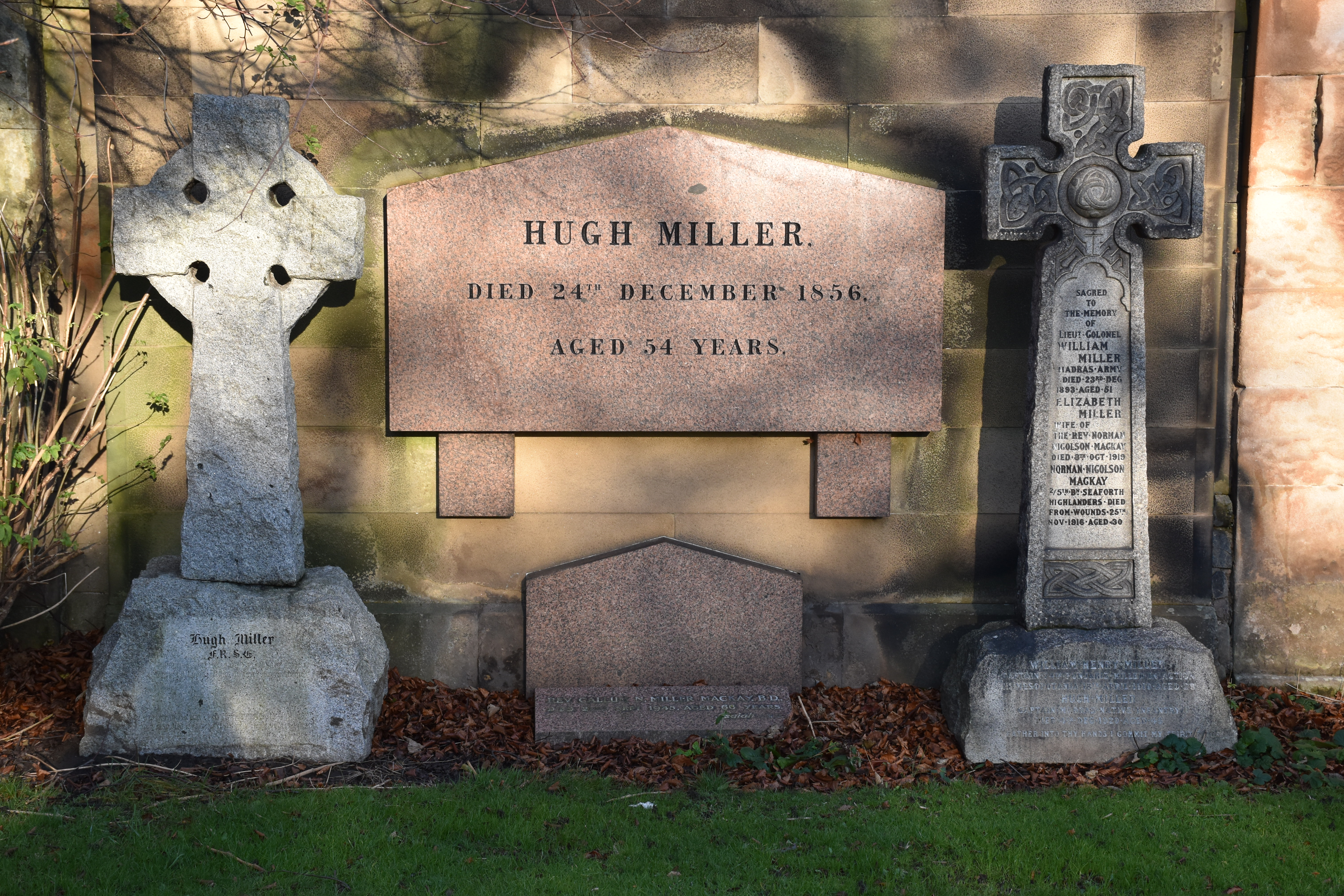
The grave of Hugh Miller, Grange Cemetery

For most of 1856, Miller had severe headaches and mental distress, and the most probable diagnosis is of psychotic depression. Victorian medicine did not help. He feared that he might harm his wife or children because of persecutory delusions.

Miller died by suicide, shooting himself in the chest with a revolver in his house, Shrub Mount, Portobello, on the night of 23/24 December 1856. That night he had finished checking printers' proofs for his book on geology and Christianity, The Testimony of the Rocks. Before his death, he wrote a poem called Strange but True. He died on 24 December 1856.

== Legacy ==
Though he had no academic credentials, he is today considered one of Scotland's most influential Victorian palaeontologists, particularly in communicating science to a wider audience. Miller made many new discoveries, including several Silurian sea scorpions (the eurypterid genus Hughmilleria was named in his honour), and many Devonian fishes, including several placoderms (the arthrodire Millerosteus also honoured him), described in his popular books. The fossil cypress Hughmillerites, the parareptile Milleretta and, the Early Jurassic brittle star fossil, Palaeocoma milleri, were also named after him. The BP-operated Miller oilfield in the North Sea was named after Hugh Miller. Hugh Miller Place, a street in the Stockbridge Colonies area of Edinburgh, is named in his honour.

Miller's wife Lydia Miller played a major role in editing and securing posthumous publication of compilations as books of many of his Witness articles and public addresses, thus gaining for him a continued wider readership for another 50 years after his death. Hugh Miller and Lydia Miller's second daughter, Harriet Miller Davidson was a published poet who married a clergyman after her father's suicide. Harriet Miller Davision moved to Adelaide where her husband was a minister and she published poems and stories in both countries about temperance and of daughters left by inspirational fathers.

There is a bust of Hugh Miller in the Hall of Heroes at the Wallace Monument in Stirling. His home in Cromarty is open as a geological museum, with specimens collected in the immediate area; a weekend event at the site in 2008 was part of celebrations marking the bicentenary of the Geological Society of London.

The Hugh Miller Trail starts at a small car park on a minor road just past Eathie Mains, about 3 miles (4.8 km) south of Cromarty, and leads about 1 mile (1.6 km) down a steep slope through woodland to the foreshore at Eathie Haven on the Moray Firth, where Miller began collecting fossils. It was here that he found his first fossil ammonite, in Jurassic rocks. The haven was originally a salmon fishing station, and a former fishermen's bothy, open to the public, has a display board about the geology of the area and Miller's fossil discoveries.

== Main works ==
- Scenes and legends of the north of Scotland : or, The traditional history of Cromarty (1834)
- The old red sandstone : or, New walks in an old field (1841)
- First impressions of England and its people (1847)
- The foot-prints of the Creator: or, The Asterolepis of Stromness (1849)
- My schools and schoolmasters; or, The story of my education (1854)
- The cruise of the Betsey : or, a summer ramble among the fossiliferous deposits of the Hebrides; with Rambles of a geologist; or, Ten thousand miles over the fossiliferous deposits of Scotland (1857)
- The testimony of the rocks; or, Geology in its bearings on the two theologies, natural and revealed (1857)
- The old red sandstone; or, New walks in an old field. To which is appended a series of geological papers, read before the Royal Physical Society of Edinburgh (1858)
- Sketch-book of popular geology being a series of lectures delivered before the Philosophical Institution of Edinburgh (1859)
- Popular geology: a series of lectures read before the Philosophical Institution of Edinburgh, with Descriptive sketches from a geologist's portfolio (1859)
- The headship of Christ and The rights of the Christian people (1860)
- Tales and sketches (1862)
- Edinburgh and its neighbourhood, geological and historical; with the geology of the Bass rock (1863)
- Essays, historical and biographical, political, social, literary and scientific (1865)
- Hugh Miller's memoir : from stonemason to geologist by Hugh Miller (1995)
- Hugh Miller and the controversies of Victorian science (1996)

== Biographies ==
- The Life of Hugh Miller – A Sketch for Working Men (1862) The Compiler (Northern Daily Express)
- Peter Bayne (1871), The Life and Letters of Hugh Miller, Volume 1, Volume 2
- Life of Hugh Miller (1880)
- Hugh Miller – A Critical Study (1905)
- George Rosie (1981), Hugh Miller: Outrage and Order, Mainstream Publishing, Edinburgh, ISBN 0-906391-17-2
- Anderson, Lyall I. (2005) "Hugh Miller: introducing palaeobotany to a wider audience", in Bowden, A.J., Burek, C.V. & Wilding, R. (eds). History of Palaeobotany: Selected Essays. Geological Society, London, Special Publications, 241, 63 – 90.

== In literature and the arts ==
The play Hugh Miller by Stewart Conn was staged at the Netherbow Theatre on the Edinburgh Festival Fringe in August 1988, with Alec Heggie in the title role. Miller is also featured in the Idlewild song 'Idea Track'.
