= Cromarty =

Town and civil parish in Scotland

Coordinates: 57.681°N 4.035°W

Cromarty: Scottish Gaelic: Cromba
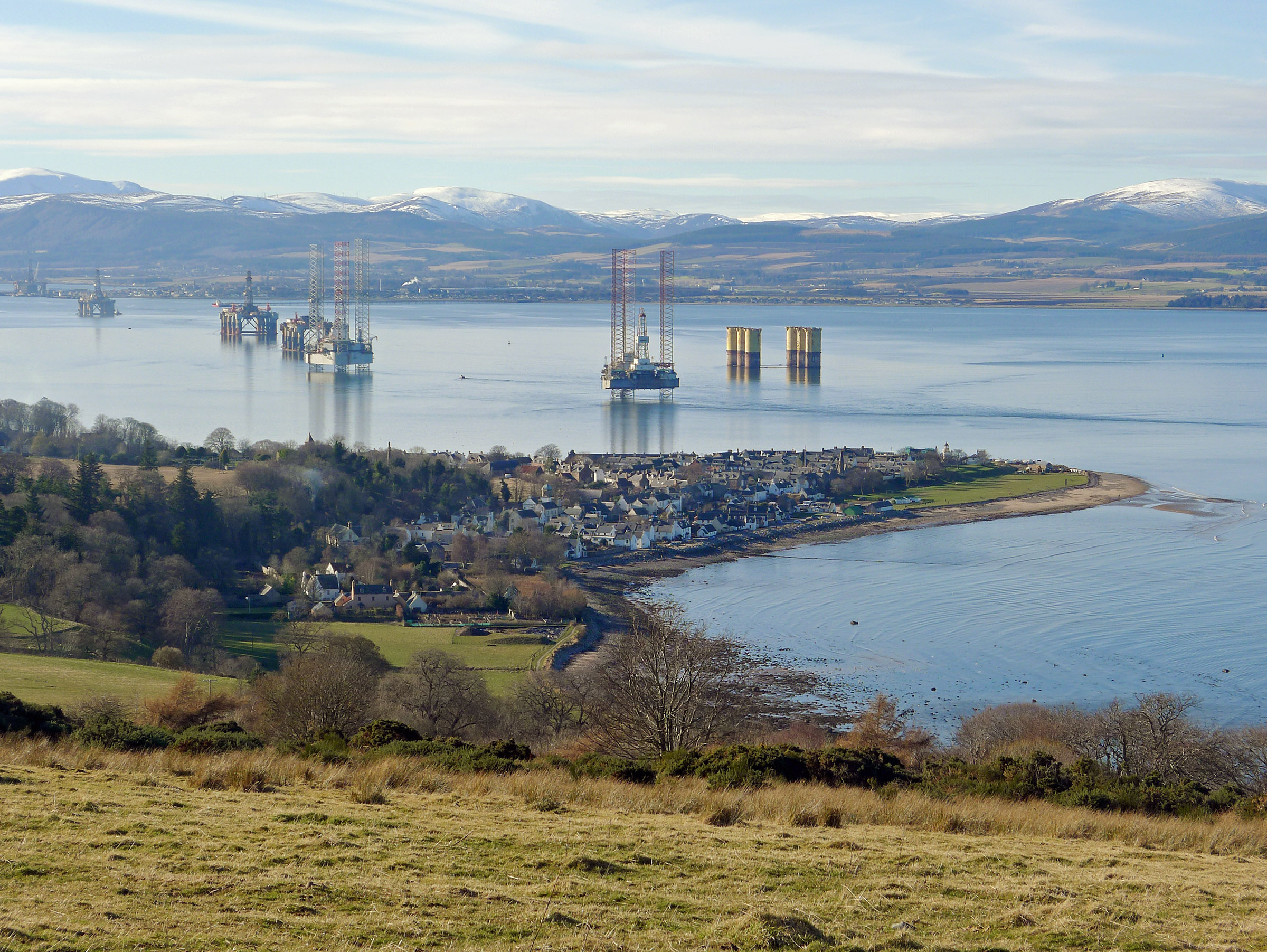

- Location within the Ross and Cromarty area
- Population: 660 (2020)
- OS grid reference: NH785675
- Council area: Highland
- Lieutenancy area: Ross and Cromarty
- Country: Scotland
- Sovereign state: United Kingdom
- Post town: CROMARTY
- Postcode district: IV11
- Dialling code: 01381
- Police: Scotland
- Fire: Scottish
- Ambulance: Scottish
- UK Parliament: Caithness, Sutherland and Easter Ross
- Scottish Parliament: Skye, Lochaber and Badenoch

Cromarty ( /ˈkrɒmərti/; Scottish Gaelic: Cromba, IPA: [ˈkʰɾɔumpə]) is a town, civil parish and former royal burgh in Ross and Cromarty, in the Highland area of Scotland. Situated at the tip of the Black Isle on the southern shore of the mouth of Cromarty Firth, it is 5 miles (8 km) seaward from Invergordon on the opposite coast. In the 2022 census, it had a population of 672.

== History ==
The name Cromarty variously derives from the Gaelic crom (crooked), and from bati (bay), or from àrd (height), meaning either the "crooked bay", or the "bend between the heights" (referring to the high rocks, or Sutors, which guard the entrance to the Firth), and gave the title to the Earldom of Cromartie. In 1264, its name was Crumbathyn.

Cromarty is a sea port, and its economy was closely linked to the sea for most of its history. Fishing was the major industry, with salmon stations around the surrounding coast, and boats going out to catch herring. Other trade was also by boat: Cromarty's connections to surrounding towns were largely by ferry, while Cromarty boats exported locally-grown hemp fibre, and brought goods such as coal. The Cromarty Firth is an outstanding natural harbour, and was an important British naval base during the First World War and the Second World War. HMS Natal blew up close by on 30 December 1915 with a substantial loss of life. (Note: From 1890 (under terms of the Local Government (Scotland) Act 1889) to 1975 Cromartyshire was merged with Ross-shire under the Ross and Cromarty county council. Ross and Cromarty has later usage as the name of a district of the Highland region (1975 to 1996), and is today an area committee of the modern Highland unitary authority.) On the 26th of January 1940, HMS (Previously RMS) Durham Castle, while being towed to Scapa Flow, hit a mine laid by U-Boat U-57 11 nautical miles to the east of the town. Cromarty gives its name to one of the sea areas of the British Shipping Forecast.

Cromarty Castle was the seat of the Urquharts, who were the hereditary sheriffs of Cromarty. The town was a royal burgh, and the ferry to Nigg was on the royal pilgrimage route north to Tain. In 1513 King James IV went on a pilgrimage and stayed in Cromarty Castle for 1 night. Until 1890, it served as the county town of Cromartyshire.

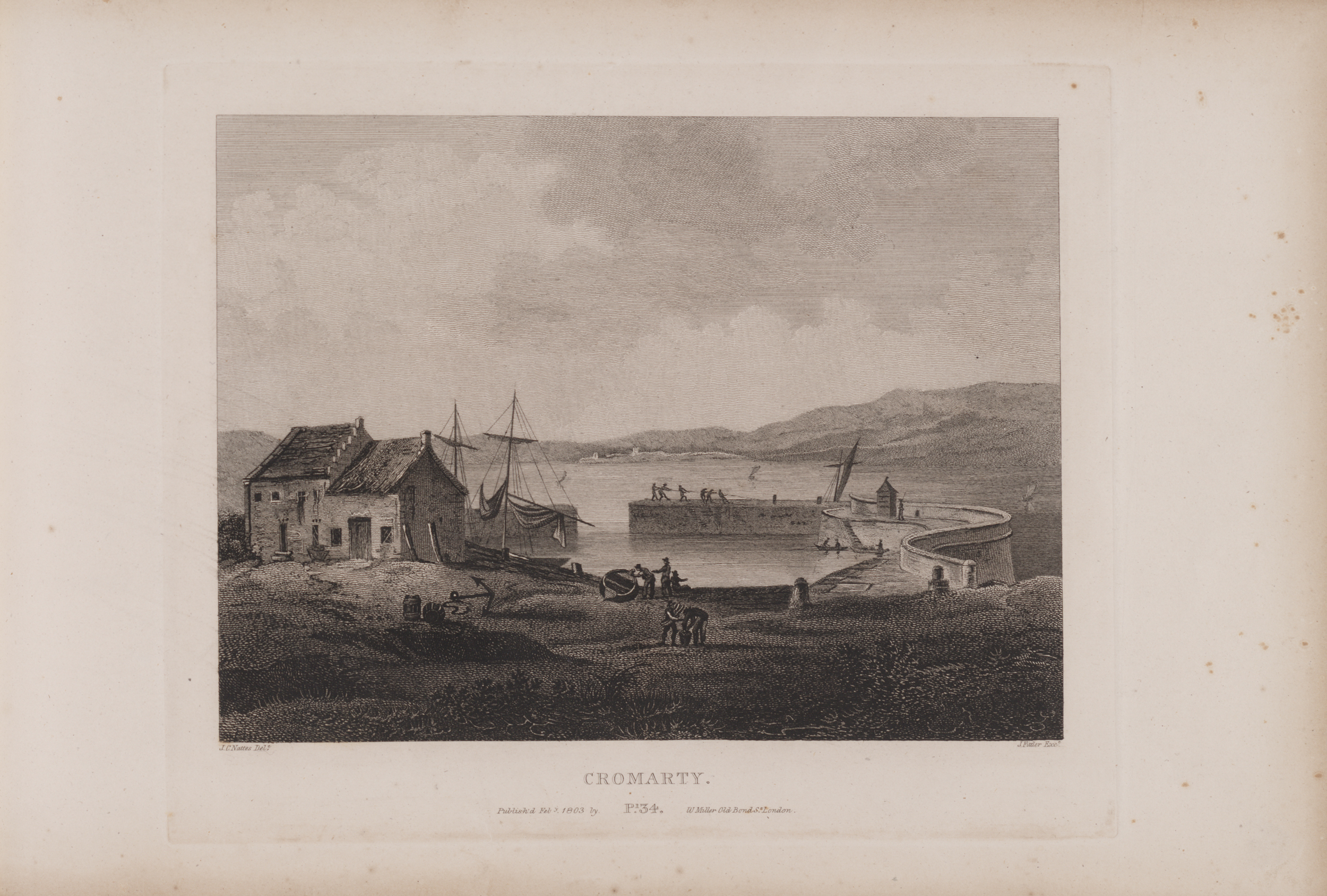
Etching of Cromarty from Scotia Depicta by James Fittler

The site of the town's mediaeval burgh dating to at least the 12th century was identified by local archaeologists after winter storms in 2012 eroded sections of the shoreline. A community archaeology project, which began in 2013, has investigated the remains of roads and buildings at the site on the eastern edge of the present town.

Cromarty was the birthplace of Sir Thomas Urquhart, the polymath Royalist most famous as the first translator of Rabelais into English.

In the nineteenth century, Cromarty was the birthplace and home of Hugh Miller, a geologist, writer, journalist and participant in the Disruptions in the Church of Scotland. Among his works was a collection of local folklore, such as the legend, dating from around 1740, that a Cromarty man named John Reid was granted three wishes from a mermaid, and that he used one of the wishes to marry a woman named Helen Stuart.

In 1818 romantic poet John Keats and his friend Charles Brown took a boat from Cromarty back to London after their tour of Scotland.

== Geography ==
The burgh is noted as a base for viewing the local offshore sea life. These include one of the most northerly groups of bottlenose dolphins. Cromarty, along with Chanonry Point just round the coast, is one of the best places in Europe to see these animals close to the shore.

The predominant local stone is the Old Red Sandstone about which Hugh Miller wrote. Many fossils can also be found in the rocks along the coast.

== Governance ==
=== UK Parliamentary constituency ===
Cromarty is in the UK Parliament constituency of Caithness, Sutherland and Easter Ross, represented since 2024 by Jamie Stone.

Following the Act of Union in 1707, the British parliamentary constituency of Cromartyshire was created, replacing the former Parliament of Scotland shire constituency. also called Cromartyshire. Paired as an alternating constituency with neighbouring Nairnshire, the freeholders of Cromartyshire elected one Member of Parliament to one Parliament, while those of Nairnshire elected a Member to the next. In 1832 the town of Cromarty was separated from the county, and became a parliamentary burgh, combined with Dingwall, Dornoch, Kirkwall, Tain and Wick in the Northern Burghs constituency of the House of Commons of the Parliament of the United Kingdom. Known also as Wick Burghs, the constituency was a district of burghs. It was represented by one Member of Parliament. In 1918, the constituency was abolished and the Cromarty component was merged into the county constituency of Ross and Cromarty. Following a boundary change in 1983, the sitting MP, Hamish Gray (Conservative and Unionist Party) was defeated by Charlie Kennedy (SDP, later Liberal then Liberal Democrats), who would go on to lead the Liberal Democrats, and who represented Cromarty until 2015, as the MP for Ross, Cromarty and Skye (1983–1997), Ross, Skye and Inverness West (1997–2005) and then Ross, Skye and Lochaber. (2005–2015) Cromarty was represented by Ian Blackford from 2015 until 2024 when Ross, Skye and Lochaber was abolished. Cromarty then became part of Caithness, Sutherland and Easter Ross, represented by Jamie Stone.

=== Scottish Parliament Constituency ===
In the Scottish Parliament, Cromarty has been represented since 2026 by Andrew Baxter, a Liberal Democrat politician as part of the Skye, Lochaber and Badenoch constituency. Prior to 2011, it was part of the Ross, Skye and Inverness West Constituency. As well as the constituency MSP, Cromarty is represented by seven additional-member MSPs, elected across the Highlands and Islands Region. Since the 2026 Scottish Parliament election these have been Ariane Burgess and Kristopher Leask (Green), Maree Todd (SNP), Max Bannerman and Victor Currie (Reform), Tim Eagle (Conservative) and Morven-May MacCallum (Lib Dems).

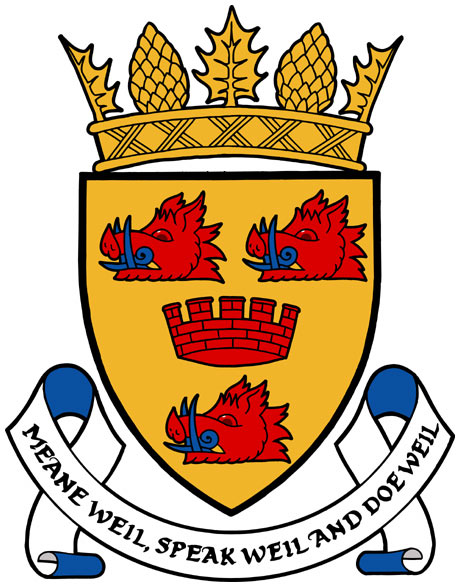
Coat of arms of Cromarty and District Community Council

Local Authority

Cromarty is within the Highland council area, the successor to the Highland region which superseded the local government county of Ross and Cromarty in 1975. Since the local elections in 2017, its councillors, for the Black Isle ward, have been Craig Fraser (SNP), Gordon Adam (Liberal Democrats) and Jennifer Barclay (Independent).

Community Council

The Cromarty and District Community Council consists of seven members, elected for four-year terms. Three of these members are elected annually to serve as chairman, Secretary and Treasurer. Its coat of arms, granted in 1988, are based on the arms of Urquhart of Cromarty, with a mural coronet placed in the middle of the boars’ heads, signifying a town, and the motto is that of the Urquharts. The official blazon is: Or, three boars' heads erased Gules, armed and langued Azure, in the centre of the shield a mural coronet of the Second. Above the Shield is placed a mural coronet suitable to a statutory Community Council, videlicet:- a circlet richly chased from which are issuant four thistle leaves (one and two halves visible) and four pine cones (two visible) Or, and in an Escrol below the Shield this Motto "Meane Well, Speak Weil, and Doe Weil".

== Architecture and landmarks ==
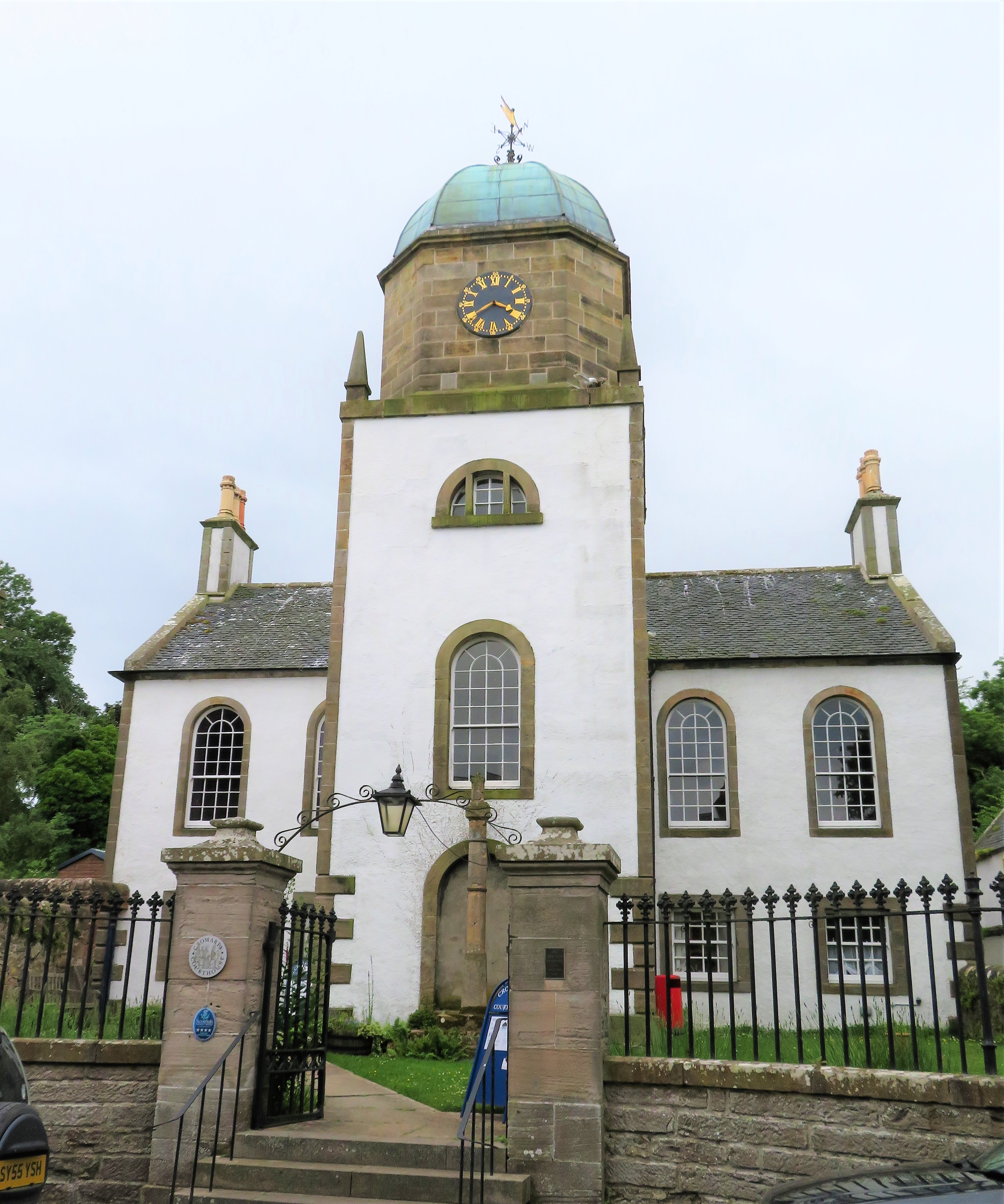
Cromarty Courthouse

Cromarty is architecturally important for its Georgian merchant houses, such as Forsyth House, built by William Forsyth, that stand within a townscape of Georgian and Victorian fisherman's cottages in the local vernacular style. It is an outstanding example of an 18th/19th century burgh, "the jewel in the crown of Scottish Vernacular Architecture". The cottage with crow-stepped gables in Church Street, in which the geologist Hugh Miller was born (in 1801), is now the only remaining thatched building in Cromarty, with most houses having switched to slate roofs.

To the east of the burgh is Cromarty House, built by George Ross in 1772 on the site of the former Cromarty Castle, which he demolished. Ross also built several other notable buildings in Cromarty: a seven-bay brewery, at the time the biggest in the Highlands, of which two bays remain (now used as a residential arts and training centre); Cromarty Courthouse, now a museum; a hemp factory, converted into housing in the 1970s; the harbour, designed by John Smeaton; and a new chapel just outside the town to hold services in Gaelic for the many Gaelic-speaking workers who moved to Cromarty in the period, later used by Polish soldiers during the Second World War.

While the Gaelic chapel is now ruined, its graveyard is still active as Cromarty's cemetery, and the town's war memorial and a monument to Hugh Miller are situated next to it. Other buildings of note in Cromarty include the Stevenson Lighthouse, built in 1846, and the East Kirk, an important example of a medieval kirk in the Scottish vernacular, restored in the 2000s by the Scottish Redundant Churches Trust.

== Transport ==
Historically most travel to Cromarty would have been by ship: ferries connected the town with Invergordon, and Cromarty's post continued to arrive by boat into the 20th century. The historic ferry route between Cromarty and Nigg was served until 2009 by Britain's smallest vehicle ferry, the Cromarty Rose. The Cromarty Rose was sold in 2009 and replaced for the 2011 season by a new four-car ferry called the Cromarty Queen, which continued the service from 2011 to 2014. After a year with no ferry in 2015, new operators, Highland Ferries, were awarded the ferry contract and re-commenced the regular service between Cromarty and Nigg with the Renfrew Rose running from June to September, from 8:00 a.m. to 6:00 p.m. daily, once again offering a direct route North from the Black Isle.

== Education ==
Cromarty has a small primary school named Cromarty Primary School with around 50 pupils. The University of Aberdeen Department of Zoology Lighthouse Field Station is based in Cromarty.

== Community and culture ==
The small community is also known for being a hub of creative activity, with several arts venues, local artists and a small cinema. The Cromarty Arts Trust, which restored several buildings in the town, including the Brewery and the Stables, organises a programme of arts and music events, including concerts and gigs, an annual Crime and Thrillers weekend, a Harp Weekend and stone letter carving and silver working courses, while the Cromarty Group of artists hold an annual exhibition of their work. Other local community groups include the Cromarty History Society, which holds regular lectures, and the Cromarty and Resolis Film Society, which organises a Film Festival every December. Guests of the 2008 festival included Kirsty Wark, Donald Shaw and Karen Matheson, Janice Forsyth, David Mackenzie and Michael Caton-Jones. Each guest selected five of their favourite films, one of which was shown during the weekend. In addition to the Favourite Films, there is an outdoor screening on a Gable End, Scottish Gaelic Short films, Animation workshop, photographic exhibition and late night Pizza and Film screenings.

In recent years, as elsewhere in Scotland, coastal rowing has become a major activity, and there are three skiffs based in Cromarty, which take part in competitions across Scotland. The Cromarty Community Rowing Club also hosts its own regatta in the summer.

== Traditional dialect ==
The town made the news in October 2012 when Bobby Hogg, the last speaker of the traditional local North Northern Scots dialect, died. This was referred to on HeraldScotland as a dialect of the Scots language, although a report on BBC Radio 4 said that the dialect had been strongly influenced by the English spoken at the local naval base and that it was one of the few areas in Scotland to exhibit H-dropping. Hogg had previously compiled a booklet of traditional words and phrases. In addition, the Highland Council had produced a digital booklet on the dialect. This states that the thou forms were still in common use in the first half of the 20th century and remained in occasional use at the time of publication.

== Notable people ==
- Sir Thomas Urquhart (b. 1611) an aristocrat, author, and translator.
- Hugh Miller a British author and actor.
- Scottish writer Ian Rankin uses a "bolt-hole" in Cromarty when writing novels
- William Forsyth (b. 1722), successful merchant
- John Fraser (b. 1827), soldier and educator, Chancellor of the University of Kansas
- James Ross (b. 1848), civil engineer and businessman in Canada
- David MacLean (b. 1953), MP for Penrith and the Border 1983–2010
- James Thomson A Surgeon during the Crimean War
