= Chris Sumner =

Australian lawyer and politician (born 1943)

The Honourable Chris Sumner AM
- Summer in 2026

44th Attorney-General of South Australia
- In office 10 November 1982 – 14 December 1993
- Premier: John Bannon; Lynn Arnold
- Preceded by: Trevor Griffin
- Succeeded by: Trevor Griffin
- In office 1 May 1979 – 18 September 1979
- Premier: Des Corcoran
- Preceded by: Don Banfield
- Succeeded by: Trevor Griffin

Member of the South Australian Legislative Council
- In office 12 July 1975 – 7 October 1994
- Succeeded by: Terry Cameron

Personal details
- Born: Christopher John Sumner; 17 April 1943 (age 83) Melbourne, Victoria, Australia
- Party: Labor
- Spouse: Suzanne Roux (m. 1978)
- Children: 2
- Education: Adelaide High School; University of Adelaide (LLB; BA); University for Foreigners in Perugia
- Occupation: Lawyer; politician

Christopher John Sumner (born 17 April 1943) is an Australian lawyer and former politician in the South Australian Legislative Council as member of the Australian Labor Party from 1975 until 1994. He was Attorney-General of South Australia between 1979 and 1993 under Premiers Des Corcoran, John Bannon and Lynn Arnold, making him the longest serving.

Sumner was born in Melbourne and came to South Australia with his parents when he was just four years old. He completed high school at Adelaide High School and the University of Adelaide, where he graduated in law in 1966 and arts in 1968. Sumner entered into Labor politics during his university days and practiced as a solicitor prior to entering parliament in 1975.

In 1979, Sumner was appointed to be Attorney-General until 1993 under premiers Corcoran, Bannon, and Arnold. Some of his legislative initiatives include the Equal Opportunity Act 1984, anti-misleading advertisements during elections through the Electoral Act 1985 and victim impact statements and victims' rights. He initiated an investigation regarding the conviction of Edward Splatt that resulted in changes to forensic processes. In 1991, the National Crime Authority's Operation Hydra dismissed charges of corruption and blackmail against Sumner.

From 1991 to 1994, Sumner was the president of the World Society of Victimology. Post retirement from the parliament in 1994, Sumner worked as a member of the National Native Title Tribunal from 1995 to 2012 for 12 years as the deputy president. Afterwards, Sumner became engaged in reconciliation and justice reforms and retired from private practice in 2022.

== Early life ==
=== Family background and schooling (1943–1959) ===
Christopher John Sumner was born in Melbourne on 17 April 1943 to Edward John Sumner and Margaret Helen Sumner (née Bettess). His parents were temporary residents of Melbourne, while Sumner himself was a fourth-generation South Australian. His father worked in the bank in the capacity of an official and later rose to become a manager of a country bank. Sumner's mother was a homemaker who at first was a hairdresser. She belonged to the organisations such as the Country Women's Association and played bowls and tennis in various clubs. Ernest William Bettess, Sumner's maternal grandfather, presided over the local council and the power company of Bute, South Australia.

Sumner returned back to South Australia together with his family at the age of four. The family lived in Bute, Plympton and Manningham until banking positions of his father took them to Manoora and then to Lyndoch where Sumner spent years from 1956 until 1959. In 1959 he moved to Adelaide to complete his education in the high school. Sumner attended Adelaide High School.

=== University and early political involvement (1961–1968) ===
After considering Roseworthy College, Sumner attended the University of Adelaide in 1961 where he pursued a degree in Law and Arts. He resided at Lincoln College for the six years that he was at university where he developed an interest in history, politics, and constitutional law. He received his Bachelor of Laws degree in 1966 and a Bachelor of Arts in 1968. He was also involved in the playing of Australian rules football at Adelaide University Football Club, where he was a member of its A1 reserves team in 1965.

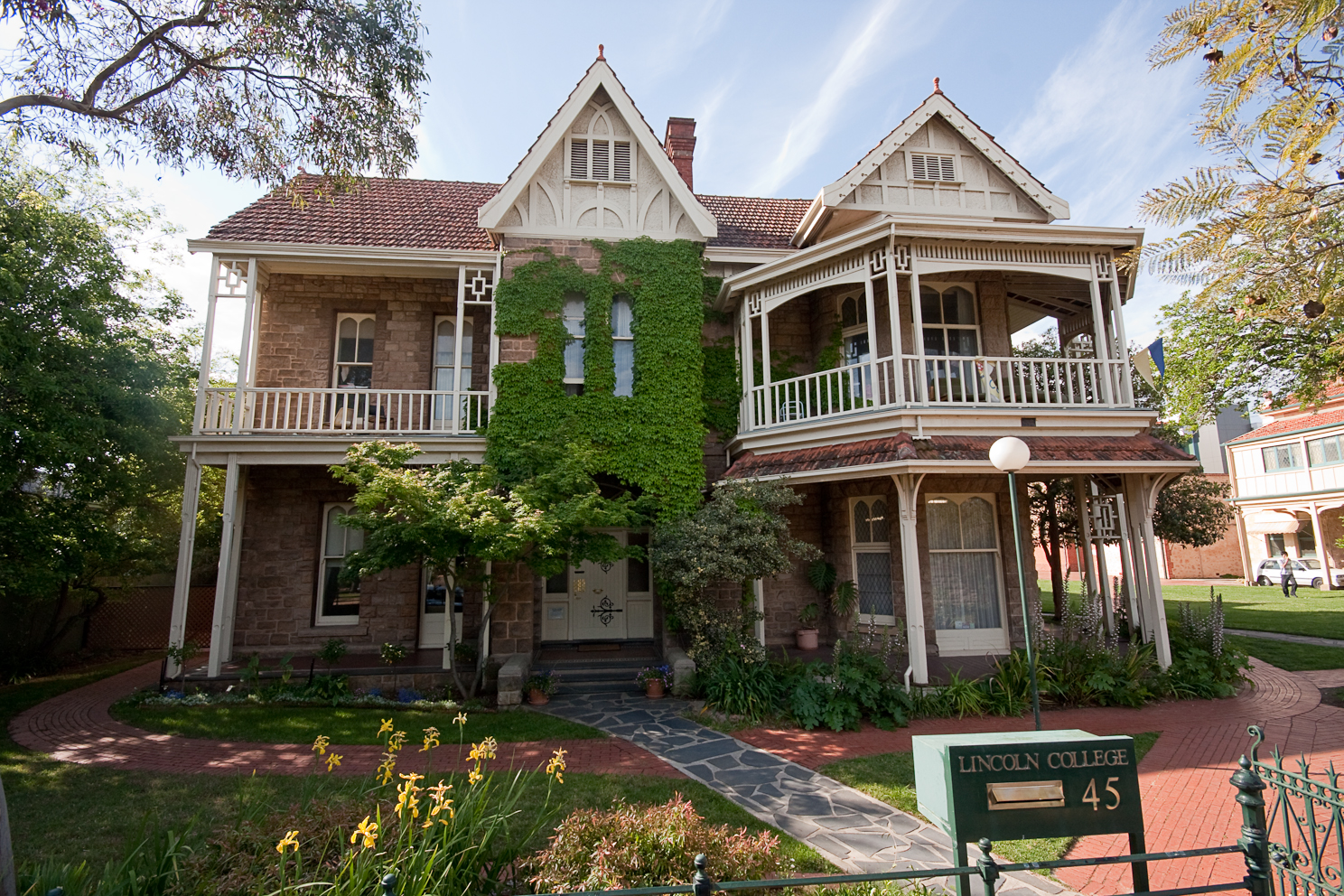
Milne House at Lincoln College, where Sumner lived while studying at the University of Adelaide

In the early 1960s, Sumner began participating in the politics of the university's Australian Labor Party (ALP) club which included among its members John Bannon, David Combe, and Gordon Bilney. Sumner formed a close relationship with Bannon between 1963 and 1964. In spite of having a conservative background, he became a member of Labor because of his worries about racial equality, Aboriginal Australians, and their conditions and education. Politically, he was inspired by Gough Whitlam and Don Dunstan, especially Dunstan's support for electoral reform and civil liberties and his opposition to the White Australia policy. A trip to India, for three months with other students, starting from late 1963, enhanced his interest in international development and economic disparity.

=== Early legal career and teaching (1966–1972) ===
Legal articles with Stanley and Partners were commenced by Sumner in 1966. Sumner was called to the bar and enrolled as a solicitor in December 1967. Sumner later became a salaried partner in the firm who acted for many trade unions. His work involved worker's compensation cases, personal injury cases, and probate and debt recovery. His early professional advisors included Lawrie Stanley and Terry McRae.

Sumner was admitted to the Law Society of South Australia in 1968 and remained there until he stopped practicing law. Apart from being a legal practitioner, Sumner also acted as a part-time tutor in politics at the University of Adelaide between 1968 and 1972. In 1970, Sumner left Stanley & Partners and went on an overseas trip with his partner, Melanie Beresford, and another lawyer. He came back to Adelaide in 1971 after being away for about thirteen or fourteen months.

== Early political career ==
=== Enrty into politics (1965–1975) ===
Sumner supported Labor during the 1965 South Australian state election and was contemplating a career in politics alongside his legal profession. He unsuccessfully contested the federal seat of Boothby in the 1969 Australian federal election and the seat of Torrens in the 1973 state election. Sumner left his legal career in early 1973 and joined the office of Senator Reg Bishop in the Whitlam government as his assistant. This stint came to an end in December of that year. In 1974, he stayed in Italy for eight months, where he studied the Italian language at the University for Foreigners in Perugia.

The Legislative Council chamber at Parliament House, Adelaide, c. 1939

Sumner was elected to the South Australian Legislative Council on 12 July 1975 as the number six candidate on the ALP's list. This was the first council election conducted under universal adult suffrage and statewide proportional representation, using a closed-list system in which voters selected party lists rather than individual candidates. The election followed a dispute over the transfer of South Australia's railways to the Commonwealth. Upon becoming a member of parliament, he continued practicing law once a week until he became Attorney-General.

=== Ministerial appointments (1975–1980) ===
Sumner worked as a backbencher for the Dunstan government from 1975 to 1979. He was made responsible by Dunstan for mediating between the ALP members in parliament and the ethnic minority groups. His ability to speak Italian helped him deal with Italian community representatives. As such, he helped formulate policies regarding interpreters, teaching of community languages in schools and financial support to Ethnic Broadcasters Incorporated, a community broadcasting initiative. He worked with the Ethnic Affairs Branch in the Premier's Department without having any ministerial responsibility for it.

Among his other parliamentary concerns were law and reform of the Legislative Council. Sumner was a member of the Joint Committee on Subordinate Legislation from 6 August 1975 to 1 May 1979. In regard to the sacking of the Police Commissioner, Harold Salisbury, he was part of the Labor's parliamentary caucus. It was later revealed that backbenchers were not involved in the decision making process.

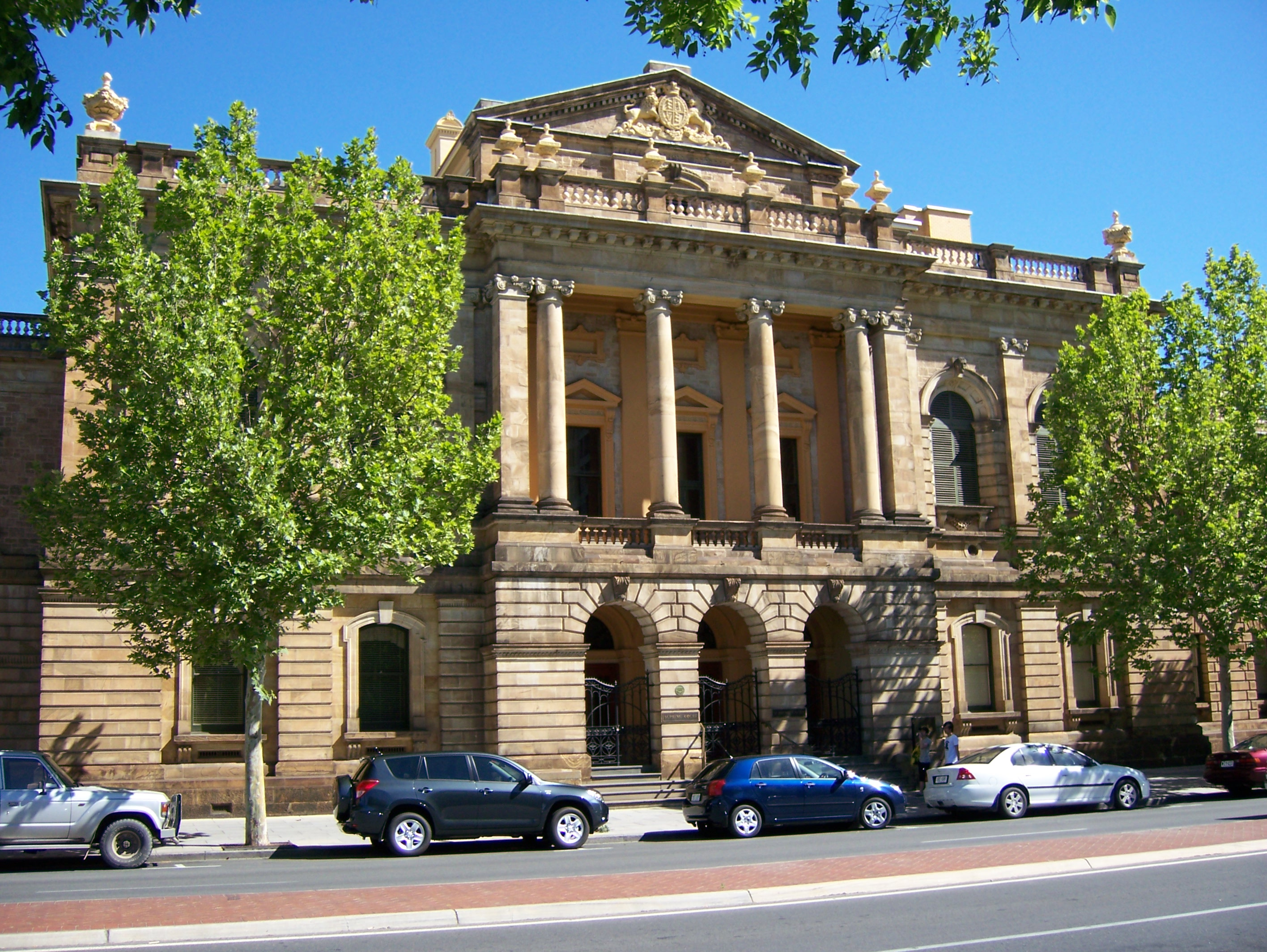
The Supreme Court of South Australia, viewed from Victoria Square in 2006

In light of the resignation of Dunstan and the emergence of the Des Corcoran's government early in 1979, Sumner became Attorney-General on 1 May 1979. Besides his Attorney General portfolio, he was also Minister Assisting the Premier on Ethnic Affairs and Minister of Prices and Consumer Affairs. While delivering his commission as the Attorney-General at a ceremony conducted by the Supreme Court of South Australia, he called for improved coordination of law reform activities in Australia.

During his term as the Attorney-General, Sumner had a different view from Chief Justice Len King on how the legal profession should be organised. King wanted to make the new Queen's Counsel undertake that they should practise individually in the Bar instead of remaining in the solicitors' firms. Sumner agreed initially but later turned against him. His first term as the Attorney-General lasted about four and a half months before it ended following Labor's loss at the September 1979 state election. Following this, Sumner was appointed as the Leader of the Opposition in the Legislative Council on 18 September 1979.

In 1980, the Pitjantjatjara Land Rights Bill was re-introduced by Sumner in the Legislative Council, but on the grounds of the convention of parliament not allowing private member's bill regarding the alienation of the crown land, President of Council Arthur Whyte declared it out of order and Sumner moved that the government bring the bill in the House of Assembly.

== Attorney-General ==
=== Bannon government (1982–1988) ===
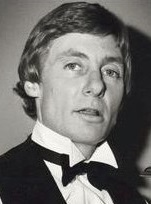
Bannon in 1980

Sumner was re-elected to the Legislative Council at the South Australian state election on 6 November 1982. Following Bannon's ALP victory in the 1982 state election, he returned as Attorney-General on 10 November 1982. Sumner was also appointed as Minister of Ethnic Affairs from 10 November 1982 and Minister of Consumer Affairs and Minister of Corporate Affairs from 11 November 1982. The Bannon government retained the Ethnic Affairs Commission created by the Tonkin government.

Prior to the election, the ALP had promised to set up a royal commission to look into the conviction of Edward Splatt. Once Sumner assumed office, he ordered Carl Shannon to undertake an investigation into the conviction and the evidence used in this case. The inquiry process resulted in new ways in which forensic evidence is collected and examined in South Australia and in the establishment of a separate forensic science section.

In addition, Sumner managed to convince the cabinet of the appointment of Elliott Johnston to the Supreme Court of South Australia despite several unsuccessful attempts by both the Dunstan and Corcoran governments. Sumner recommended Johnston because of his competence and reputation. Later, he referred to the support of Law Society president David Wicks and Justice Roma Mitchell for the appointment. In addition, from 22 to 27 April 1983, Sumner looked after the portfolios of Agriculture, Fisheries and Forestry.

Reforms to electoral law, anti-discrimination legislation, and liquor licensing legislation were sought by Sumner during the mid-1980s. In 1984, Sumner presented the Anti-Discrimination Bill which dealt with remedies for discrimination, sexual harassment and inequalities between men and women in terms of treatment by membership and service organisations. The Equal Opportunity Act 1984 provided protection against discrimination on the basis of sexual preference and sexual harassment. Legislation prohibiting age discrimination was supported in both houses of Parliament.

The Electoral Act 1985 was enacted, which banned materially false or misleading statement of facts in electoral advertisements. In that year, after Graham Prior was appointed to the Supreme Court, Catherine Branson was recommended by Sumner for appointment as Crown Solicitor and head of the Attorney-General's Department. She was the first woman to head a South Australian Government Department. During this period, John Doyle, who was the Solicitor-General, worked with the constitutional lawyer Bradley Selway, and Sumner brought in a salary structure for government lawyers based on judicial salaries.

He also participated in the United Nations Congress on Crime Prevention and Criminal Justice held in Milan in the same year. In the latter part of the year, he brought in some provisions regarding victims' rights in South Australia, and received bipartisan support from Trevor Griffin. This was done through victim impact statements, declaration of victims' rights in the administration of justice, and levies to assist in compensating victims. In 1987, he gave the John Barry Memorial Lecture at the University of Melbourne.

=== Later Bannon and Arnold governments (1988–1993) ===
Sumner instructed criminal law professor Matthew Goode to review some recommendations from the Mitchell Report, which had been compiled when Len King held office as Attorney-General. The recommendations were partly accepted. In the late 1980s, the legislation regarding sentencing was changed, and the factors to be considered by courts, along with imprisonment as the measure of last resort, were identified. During the 1980s, Sumner worked together with Deputy Premier and the Minister for Corrective Services, Frank Blevins.

The High Court of Australia Building, which decided Cole v Whitfield in 1988

In 1988, the legal advisors for the Bannon government were involved in Cole v Whitfield case before the High Court of Australia, which concerned Section 92 of the Constitution of Australia and freedom of interstate trade. Sumner also gave a speech in Italian when the Italian President, Francesco Cossiga, visited South Australia in 1988.

On 9 November 1988, Sumner put forward a compromise on national corporations and securities legislation. According to this scheme, the federal government would control the takeovers and securities markets, whereas the States would be responsible for managing the operations of the corporations. By March 1989, he realised that this scheme is not viable, regardless of the attempts by the Victorian Attorney-General Andrew McCutcheon to revitalise it.

In February 1989, Sumner had a nervous breakdown, because allegations were made against him on corruption and blackmail in relation to high-ranking public servants. Allegations made by the Bannon government were investigated by the National Crime Authority (NCA) under the code name "Operation Hydra." After appointing Peter Faris as the chairman of the authority in 1989, this body started investigating Sumner and blackmail at the vice venues. He was interrogated for over fourteen hours.

Sumner was no longer Minister for Ethnic Affairs from 20 April 1989. Prior to the state election in 1989, he formulated a community crime prevention policy that would tackle the various factors that contributed to criminal activity. This policy suggested financial assistance from the government for street lighting, home protection, and help for vulnerable groups. These, in Sumner's view, supplemented law enforcement and incarceration and was supported by Griffin.

In the election held on 25 November 1989, Sumner was re-elected to the Legislative Council as the Labor candidate in first place. He polled 339,051 votes, out of which 333,222 were ticket votes and 5,829 were for the candidate himself. On 14 December, Sumner became Minister for Crime Prevention and gave up the Consumer Affairs portfolio.

In the early 1990s, Sumner was involved in a failed attempt to restrict the scope of the constitutional power of the federal government regarding excises, and thus enable broader state tax powers. Doyle and Selway helped him in these attempts.

In February 1991, the NCA's Operation Hydra cleared Sumner of all the allegations against him and concluded there was no evidence that he had gone to any vice premises, was improperly connected with convicted or suspected criminals, or did anything improper in his association with Gianni Malvaso or in relation to his prosecution. The findings were based not only on document and testimonial evidence but also on personal and professional contacts. Cases where someone else used the name "Sumner" as well as a man who looked like the Attorney-General was mistaken for him were identified during the investigation. In 1991, Sumner became the president of the World Society of Victimology (WSV).

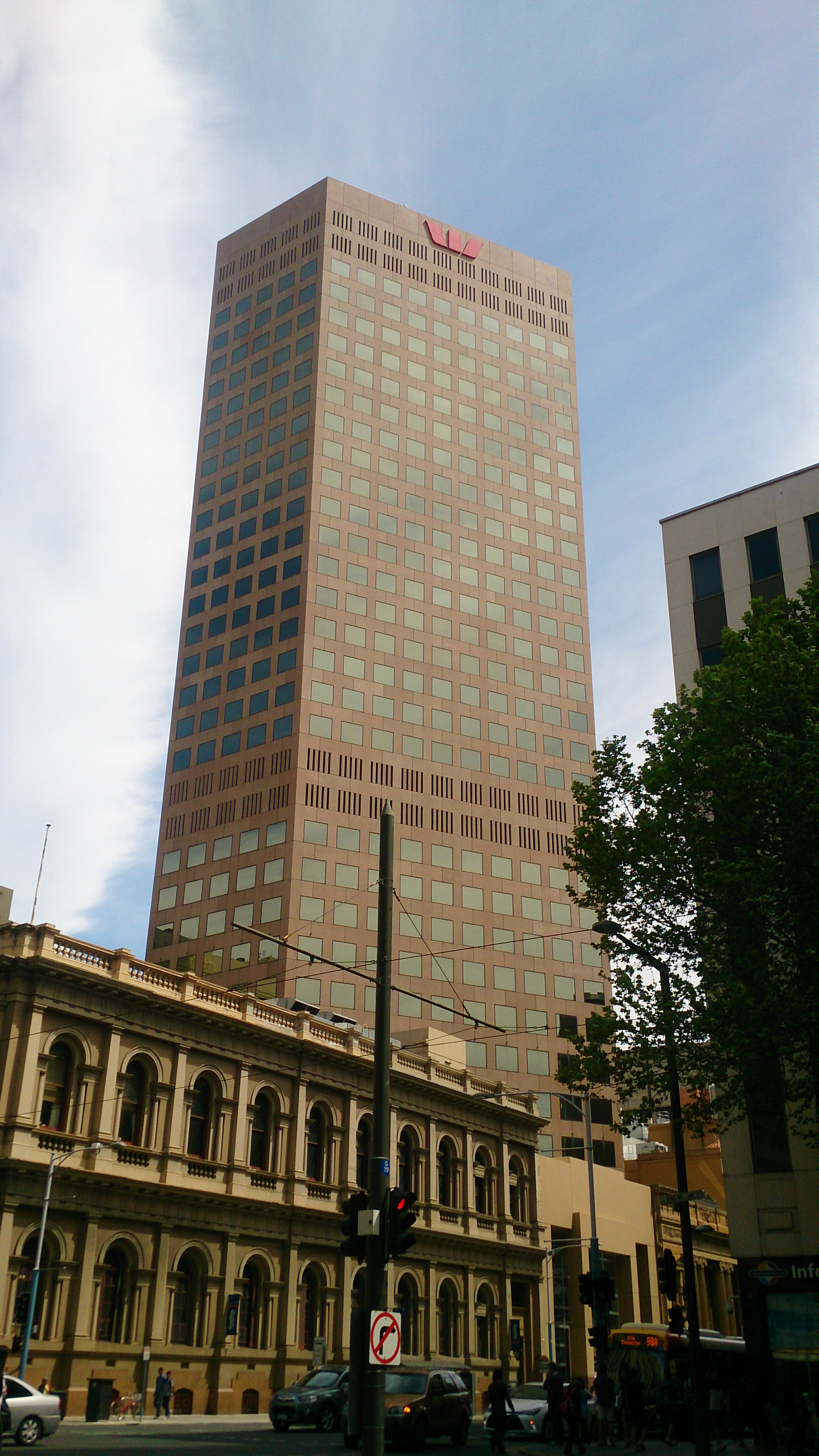
The former State Bank Building, now RAA Place, in Adelaide in 2016

During the last few years of Bannon's premiership, Sumner played an important role in establishing the royal commission into the failure of the State Bank of South Australia. Sumner criticised the attempt to ascertain political responsibility before MacPherson's inquiry was complete. Sumner also criticised Commissioner Sam Jacobs' behavior towards Bannon, although he acknowledged that Bannon had political responsibility. According to Lynn Arnold, Sumner opposed Bannon's resignation in September 1992. Following their agreement to challenge for the Labor leadership, Sumner and Blevins contacted caucus members prior to the leadership ballot. Bannon resigned from his position on 4 September 1992, before the release of the State Bank Royal Commission's first report on 17 November 1992.

With Arnold as Premier, Sumner served as Minister for Public Sector Reform from 1 October 1992, when he gave up the role of Minister for Corporate Affairs. From 3 September 1993, he was appointed as the Minister of Justice and Minister of Correctional Services. These roles, along with that of the Attorney-General and Minister for Crime Prevention, were retained by him till 14 December 1993.

=== Opposition and retirement (1993–1994) ===
With the defeat of Labor in the 1993 state election, the period in government for Sumner came to an end. On 14 December, he assumed roles as Shadow Attorney-General and shadow minister for Education, Public Sector Reform and Consumer Affairs. On 22 December, he again became the Leader of the Opposition in the Legislative Council.

On 16 February 1994, Sumner moved the Criminal Law Consolidation (Miscellaneous) Amendment Bill, including the offence of stalking and sexual abuse of a child. On this date, he also moved for the appointment of the Legislative Review Committee to consider Australian and foreign models of parliamentary codes of conduct and propose an appropriate one for South Australian parliamentarians. He completed his presidency at the WSV in 1994.

He remained in his role as an opposition party politician until he resigned from parliament on 7 October 1994. This made him the longest-serving Attorney-General in South Australia's history. On a joint sitting of parliament, he was succeeded by Terry Cameron, who was sworn into the Legislative Council on 11 October. Carolyn Pickles took over as chair of the Standing Orders Committee.

== Post-political career ==
(L–R): Mike Smithson, Sumner, Don Hopgood and Greg Crafter inside Parliament House, Adelaide, on 28 May 2026

Sumner served on the National Native Title Tribunal from 1995 until his retirement on 17 April 2012, being deputy president for 12 years of this period. He was chairman of the organising committee for the eighth International Symposium on Victimology in Adelaide and editor of its conference papers, published in 1996. He became co-patron of Reconciliation SA in 2012 and patron of the Justice Reform Initiative in 2020. He retired from private practice as a lawyer in 2022.

Sumner continued his participation in public debate by supporting preservation of Adelaide Park Lands and criticising developments in the areas where Women's and Children's Hospital and Festival Plaza were to be built. He also condemned alterations in the victim support funding structure, delay in examining the ministerial code of conduct, and appointment of Police Commissioner Grant Stevens to the board of the Adelaide Football Club. In 2026, he spoke about the ALP traditions and parliamentary practice and disputed Kevin Foley's description of the abandoned Victoria Park grandstand project.

== Personal life ==
In 1978, Sumner married Suzanne Roux, and they have two children. Roux wrote a conference paper in 2005 at Flinders University.

== Honours and awards ==
Sumner received the Irene Melup Certificate of Appreciation from the WSV in 1987. He received the Italian award of Commendatore in 1989. The entitlement for Sumner to be titled "The Honourable" was published in the gazette on 24 November 1994.

Sumner received the Centenary Medal on 1 January 2001. He was conferred with the honour of Member of the Order of Australia (AM) in 2001 Australia Day Honours for services to the South Australian Parliament and the law especially regarding laying down fundamental principles of justice for the victims of crimes, multiculturalism and National Native Title Tribunal.

In November 2005, he was presented with the first ever national Victim Support Australasia Award for the benefit of victims of crime. By 2019, he had also become a life member of ethnic community radio station 5EBI.

== Selected publications ==
- Sumner, C. J. (1987). "Victim Participation in the Criminal Justice System". Australian & New Zealand Journal of Criminology. 20 (4): 195–217. doi:10.1177/000486588702000402.
- Sumner, C. J.; Sutton, A. C. (1990). "Implementing Victims' Rights—An Australian Perspective". Journal of the Australian Society of Victimology. 1 (2): 4–10.
- Sumner, C. J.; Sutton, A. C. (1992). "Victims of Crime and the Mass Media" (PDF). Criminology Australia. 3 (3): 2–4.
- Sumner, Chris; Israel, Mark; O'Connell, Michael; Sarre, Rick, eds. (1996). International Victimology: Selected Papers from the 8th International Symposium (PDF). Conference proceedings series. Vol. 27. Canberra: Australian Institute of Criminology. ISBN 0642240086.
- Sumner, Christopher J.; Wright, Lisa (2009). "The National Native Title Tribunal's Application of the Native Title Act in Future Act Inquiries". University of Western Australia Law Review. 34 (2): 191–227.

Political offices
Preceded by Don Banfield	Attorney-General of South Australia; 1979	Succeeded by Trevor Griffin
Preceded by Trevor Griffin	Attorney-General of South Australia; 1982–1993	Succeeded by Trevor Griffin
