= John Williams (legal scholar) =

Australian legal scholar (born 1967)

John Williams AM FAAL FASSA
- Williams in 2026
- Born: John Matthew Williams; 18 August 1967 (age 59)

Academic background
- Education: University of New South Wales (BA; LLB); University of Tasmania (BA); University of Technology Sydney; Australian National University (PhD)
- Thesis: The Protection of Rights Under the Australian Constitution: A Republican Analysis (1997)

Academic work
- Discipline: Law
- Sub-discipline: Constitutional law; public law; legal history; Federalism
- Institutions: University of Adelaide; Australian National University; Adelaide University
- Website: University profile

John Matthew Williams (born 18 August 1967) is an Australian legal scholar specialising in constitutional law, federalism and legal history. He serves as the deputy vice-chancellor (academic) of Adelaide University, where he also holds the Dame Roma Mitchell Chair of Law. His interests are centred on the Australian Constitution and the High Court of Australia.

Williams pursued political science and industrial relations at the University of New South Wales and later continued his education in law at the same university. He graduated from the University of Tasmania with the first-class honours Bachelor of Arts in 1991 and a graduate diploma in legal practice from the University of Technology Sydney in 1993. He earned his doctorate degree in law at the Australian National University (ANU) in 1997 after writing a thesis on the Protection of Rights Under the Australian Constitution: A Republican Analysis.

In 1997, Williams joined University of Adelaide (UofA) as a lecturer in law and later became a senior lecturer in 1999. From 2004 to 2005, he worked as a reader in law at ANU and returned to Adelaide to work as a professor of law in 2006. He was appointed founding director of the South Australian Law Reform Institute in 2010 and served as the dean of law from 2011 to 2016. He worked in several other important university administrative positions, including provost at UofA from 2023 to 2025.

== Early life and education ==
John Matthew Williams was born on 18 August 1967. He was the first member of his family to attend university as his mother, Judith M. Williams, was a social justice activist who has volunteered with many councils and charities throughout her life.

Williams joined the University of New South Wales between 1986 and 1988 and graduated with a Bachelor of Arts in political science and industrial relations. After that, he joined the same university for law between 1989 and 1992 and taught at Basser College in 1989 and 1990. In 1991, he earned a Bachelor of Arts in first-class honours from the University of Tasmania.

== Academic career ==
=== Early career (1992–2003) ===
Between 1992 and 1993, Williams was a deputy dean of Basser College. In 1993, Williams attained a Graduate Diploma in Legal Practice from the University of Technology Sydney and enrolled for PhD at the Australian National University (ANU). He got an ANU postgraduate scholarship and became a research assistant to Philip Pettit in 1994. In 1995, he tutored in constitutional law via the Aboriginal Tutorial Assistance Scheme. He later worked as a consultant to the National Archives of Australia (NAA) from 1996 to 1997.

In May 1997, Williams graduated with his PhD in the Law Program at the Research School of Social Sciences of ANU and his thesis title was The Protection of Rights under the Australian Constitution: A Republican Analysis. Later that year, he became a lecturer in law at the University of Adelaide (UofA) and rose to the position of senior lecturer in 1999. He was the editor of the Australian Journal of Legal History between 1997 and 2001 and founded The New Federalist: The Journal of Australian Federation History, which he edited between 1998 and 2002.

Williams was an ambassador for the South Australian "Yes" campaign in the referendum about the 1999 Australian republic referendum. In 2000, he took part in a senior fellowship at the University of Melbourne and became a member of the Don Dunstan Foundation's management board. Additionally, he assisted the NAA in developing its Documenting a Democracy website project, which was an electronic collection of documents relating to the legislation and constitution of Australia launched in June 2000.

Williams was an appointed professor at the University of Cape Town in 2001 and had the position of a Menzies Foundation Fellow at King's College London from 2002 to 2003. Moreover, he was on the council of the Australian Association of Constitutional Law (AACL) from 2001 to 2008 and associate dean of research at UofA from 2003 to 2004.

=== Professorship and law reform (2004–2014) ===
Between 2004 and 2005, Williams was a reader in law at ANU. He returned to UofA as a professor of law in 2006, serving as an associate dean for research till 2010. From 2006 till 2011, he edited the Adelaide Law Review while serving as the secretary of the Judicial Conference of Australia from 2006 to 2009. He had a visiting appointment at the University of Victoria in British Columbia in 2007.

From 2008 to 2014, Williams served as a member of the NAA Advisory Council. In 2008, he joined the South Australian selection committee of the Fulbright Commission while chairing the same from 2010 to 2014. In 2009, he served as a consultant to the Good Offices Mission that assisted the United Nations in its peace process in Cyprus. He also acted as the vice-president of AACL from 2009 till 2010.

Williams was appointed as the first director of the South Australian Law Reform Institute (SALRI) in 2010. From 2011 to 2018, he was responsible for its review of succession law in South Australia. The Jay Weatherill-led government commissioned this review, which resulted in seven reports as a result of the research and consultation with the public, legal practitioners and other interested parties.

Williams was the dean of law at UofA from 2011 to 2016. He and Margaret Nyland created the Dean of Law's Fund in 2014 to assist law students in financial distress. Williams was also the Harold White Fellow at the National Library of Australia.

=== University leadership (2015–present) ===
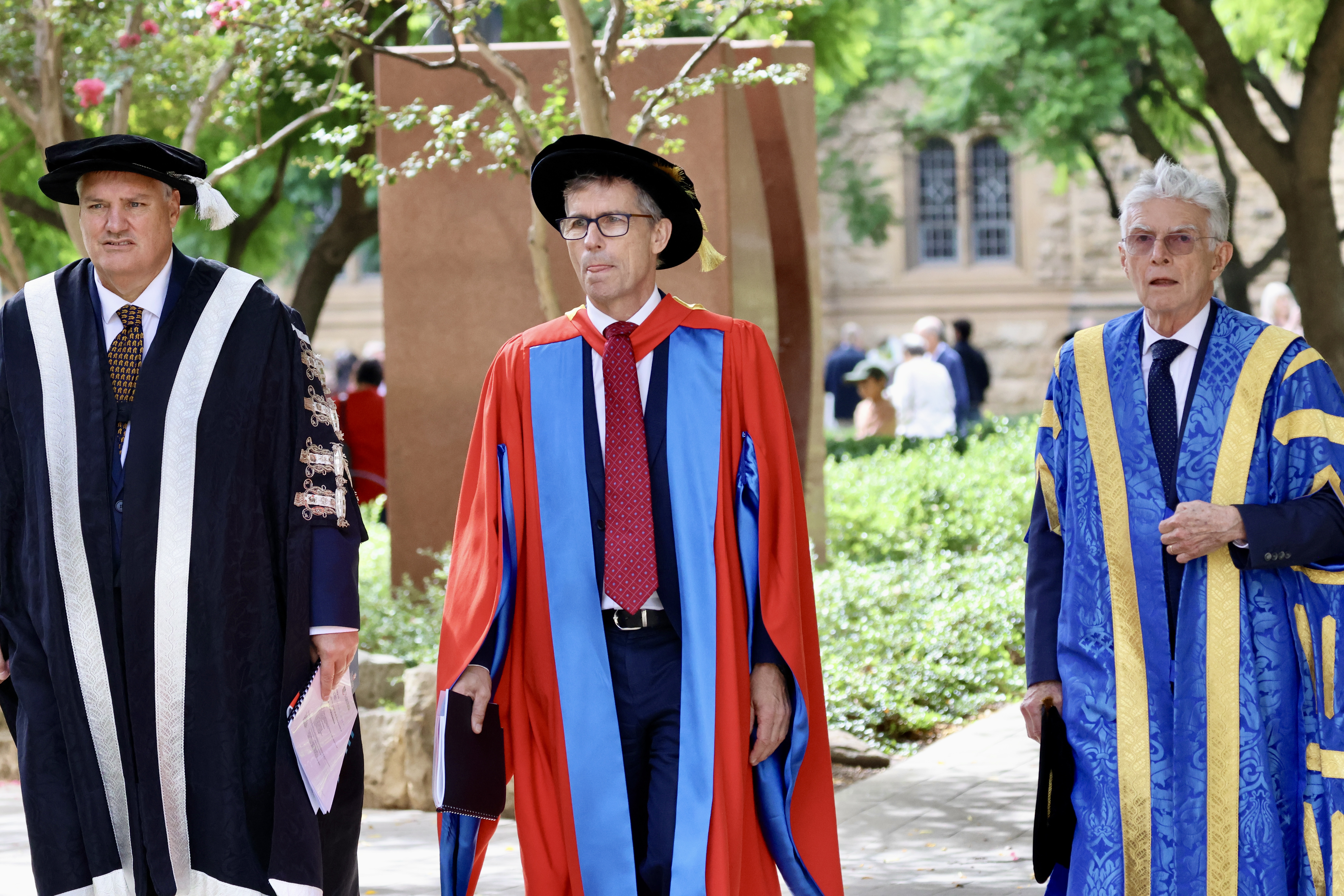
Williams, Peter Høj and John Hill at the final UofA graduation ceremonies following Høj's tenure as vice-chancellor, March 2026

In 2015, Williams was appointed to the position of Dame Roma Mitchell Chair in Law. He was also made the pro-vice-chancellor for research operations and dean of graduate studies, a combined role, which he held until 2018. He also became a member of the board of Adelaide Festival of Ideas. Williams was the chair of the university's Academic Board from 2016 to 2021.

In November 2016, Williams restated SALRI's proposal that the provocation defence, also called the "gay panic defence", be abolished. During 2017, he collaborated with Morry Bailes and a colleague from UofA to design a preferential ballot system for choosing the Law Council of Australia's executive.

Williams was appointed associate provost and executive dean of the Faculty of the Professions in 2018, serving as executive dean from then until 2022. He returned as a member of the NAA Advisory Council from 2018 until 2021.

In 2019, Williams advocated for the review of abortion laws in South Australia, as suggested by Attorney-General Vickie Chapman. The resulting SALRI report recommended that abortion be decriminalised and regulated through health laws. The report proposed 66 reforms and considered over 3,000 submissions.

Williams held several positions as acting and interim provost during 2020 and 2021. He was named the first executive dean of the Faculty of Arts, Business, Law and Economics after the merger of the Faculty of Arts and the Faculty of the Professions in March 2022.

The South Australian Parliament enacted the Succession Act 2023 in September 2023, which put into effect 107 of the 113 recommendations of the SALRI report on the succession law review. Williams acted as the provost of UofA from 2023 to 2025.

On 30 September 2024, Williams became the deputy vice-chancellor (academic) of Adelaide University, created by the merger of UofA and the University of South Australia. He took up his position on 1 October 2024 before the establishment of the new university in January 2026. Following the merger, on 6 August 2026, Arts Minister Kyam Maher appointed Williams a member of the board of the Art Gallery of South Australia for a three-year term.

== Honours and awards ==
Williams was honoured with the W. Townsley Award from the University of Tasmania in 1991 and the Best Academic Award from the Adelaide Law School in 1997. The Centenary Medal was bestowed on him in 2003.

The Australian Academy of Law conferred him with a fellowship (FAAL) in 2012. In the 2022 Australia Day Honours, Williams was made a Member of the Order of Australia (AM) for his contribution to tertiary education, law and professional bodies.

On 26 October 2025, Williams became a Fellow of the Academy of the Social Sciences in Australia (FASSA) due to his contributions to the field of Australian constitutional law.

== Selected publications ==
=== Books ===
==== Authored ====
- Williams, John (2003). One Hundred Years of the High Court of Australia. Menzies Centre for Australian Studies. ISBN 978-1-85507-124-7.
- Williams, John (2005). The Australian Constitution: A Documentary History. Melbourne University Press. ISBN 978-0-522-85042-0.

==== Edited ====
- Headon, David; Williams, John, eds. (2000). Makers of Miracles: The Cast of the Federation Story. Melbourne University Press. ISBN 978-0-522-84858-8.
- Clark, Manning (2000). Clark, Dymphna; Headon, David; Williams, John (eds.). The Ideal of Alexis de Tocqueville. Melbourne University Press. ISBN 978-0-522-84925-7.
- Naffine, Ngaire; Owens, Rosemary; Williams, John, eds. (2001). Intention in Law and Philosophy. Ashgate. ISBN 978-0-7546-2171-3.
- Macintyre, Clement; Williams, John, eds. (2003). Peace, Order and Good Government: State Constitutional and Parliamentary Reform. Wakefield Press. ISBN 978-1-86254-617-2.
- Appleby, Gabrielle; Keyzer, Patrick; Williams, John, eds. (2014). Public Sentinels: A Comparative Study of Australian Solicitors-General. Ashgate. ISBN 978-1-4094-5425-0.
- Hinton, Martin; Williams, John, eds. (2018). The Crown: Essays on Its Manifestations, Power and Accountability. University of Adelaide Press. ISBN 978-1-925261-79-0.
- Appleby, Gabrielle; Olijnyk, Anna; Stellios, James; Williams, John (2021). Judicial Federalism in Australia: History, Theory, Doctrine and Practice. Federation Press. ISBN 978-1-76002-267-9.

=== Journal articles ===
- Williams, John M. (1996). "Race, Citizenship and the Formation of the Australian Constitution: Andrew Inglis Clark and the '14th Amendment'". Australian Journal of Politics and History. 42 (1): 10–23. doi:10.1111/j.1467-8497.1996.tb01346.
- Bradsen, John; Williams, John (1997). "The Perils of Inclusion: The Constitution and the Race Power". Adelaide Law Review. 19 (1): 95–142.
- Williams, John; Rosenberg, Gerald (1997). "Do Not Go Gently into That Good Right: The First Amendment in the High Court of Australia". The Supreme Court Review. 1997 (1): 439–495. doi:10.1086/scr.1997.3109748.
- Selway, Bradley; Williams, John (2005). "The High Court and Australian Federalism". Publius: The Journal of Federalism. 35 (3): 467–488. doi:10.1093/publius/pji018.
- Evans, Simon; Williams, John (2006). Appointing Australian Judges: A New Model (PDF). Judicial Conference of Australia Colloquium, 7–9 October 2006. doi:10.2139/ssrn.938650.
- Appleby, Gabrielle; Williams, John (2009). "A Tale of Two Clerks: When Are Appropriations Appropriate in the Senate?". Public Law Review. 20 (3): 194–213.
- Williams, John; Webster, Adam (2010). "Section 100 and State Water Rights". Public Law Review. 21 (4): 267–284.
- Appleby, Gabrielle; Williams, John (2012). "A New Coat of Paint: Law and Order and the Refurbishment of Kable". Federal Law Review. 40 (1): 1–30. doi:10.22145/flr.40.1.1.
- Williams, John (2018). "Republicanism". In Saunders, Cheryl; Stone, Adrienne (eds.). The Oxford Handbook of the Australian Constitution. Oxford University Press. doi:10.1093/law/9780198738435.003.0017.
