= List of judges of the Supreme Court of South Australia =

Of the judges of the Supreme Court of South Australia, as of September 2018, 14 had previously served in the Parliament of South Australia Edward Gwynne, Sir Richard Hanson, Randolph Stow, Sir Samuel Way, Sir James Boucaut, Richard Andrews, Sir William Bundey, Sir John Gordon, Robert Homburg, Sir Angas Parsons, Sir Charles Abbott, Leo Travers, Len King and Robin Millhouse. In addition, Sir John Jeffcott served as a member of the South Australian Legislative Council concurrent with his brief tenure as a judge in South Australia.

| Position | Name | Appointment commenced | Appointment ended | Term in office | Comments | Notes |
|---|---|---|---|---|---|---|
| Chief Justice | Sir Charles Cooper | 1 July 1856 | 20 November 1861 | 5 years, 142 days | | |
| Chief Justice | Sir Richard Hanson | 20 November 1861 | 4 March 1876 | 14 years, 105 days | | |
| Chief Justice | Sir Samuel Way, 1st Baronet | 18 March 1876 | 8 January 1916 | 39 years, 296 days | | |
| Chief Justice | Sir George Murray KCMG | 20 January 1916 | 18 February 1942 | 26 years, 29 days | | |
| Chief Justice | Sir Mellis Napier KCMG | 25 February 1942 | 28 February 1967 | 25 years, 3 days | | |
| Chief Justice | Dr John Bray AC | 28 February 1967 | 28 November 1978 | 11 years, 273 days | | |
| Chief Justice | Len King AC | 30 October 1978 | 28 April 1995 | 16 years, 180 days | | |
| Chief Justice | John Doyle AC (Note: Samuel Doyle is the son of former Chief Justice John Doyle.) | 4 May 1995 | 22 June 2012 | 17 years, 49 days | | |
| Chief Justice | Chris Kourakis | 25 June 2012 | 18 February 2026 | 13 years, 238 days | | |
| Chief Justice | Laura Stein | 19 February 2026 | | 2 days | | |
| Judge of the Court of Appeal | Patricia Kelly | 1 January 2021 | 31 August 2021 | 242 days | President of the Court of Appeal from 1 January 2021 to 31 August 2021 | |
| Judge of the Court of Appeal | Mark Livesey | 1 January 2021 | | 5 years, 51 days | President of the Court of Appeal from 1 September 2021 | |
| Judge of the Court of Appeal | David Lovell | 1 January 2021 | 17 February 2025 | 4 years, 47 days | | |
| Judge of the Court of Appeal | Samuel Doyle | 1 January 2021 | | 5 years, 51 days | | |
| Judge of the Court of Appeal | Chris Bleby | 1 January 2021 | | 5 years, 51 days | | |
| Judge of the Court of Appeal | Sophie David | 1 September 2021 | | 4 years, 173 days | | |
| Judge of the Court of Appeal | Tim Stanley | 18 February 2025 | | 1 year, 3 days | | |
| Judge of the Court of Appeal | Ben Doyle (Note: Ben Doyle is the son of former Chief Justice John Doyle and the brother of Justice Samuel Doyle.) | 19 February 2026 | | 2 days | | |
| Judge | Sir John Jeffcott | 27 May 1836 | 12 December 1837 | 1 year, 199 days | | |
| Judge | Sir Charles Cooper | July 1838 | 20 November 1861 | 23 years, 112–142 days | | |
| Judge | Dr George Crawford | 27 June 1850 | 24 September 1852 | 2 years, 89 days | | |
| Judge | Benjamin Boothby | 25 February 1853 | 29 July 1867 | 14 years, 154 days | removed from office | |
| Judge | Edward Gwynne | 26 February 1859 | 28 February 1881 | 22 years, 2 days | | |
| Judge | William Wearing | 8 August 1867 | 25 February 1875 | 7 years, 201 days | | |
| Judge | Randolph Stow | 15 March 1875 | 17 September 1878 | 3 years, 186 days | | |
| Judge | Sir James Boucaut | 25 September 1878 | 24 February 1905 | 26 years, 152 days | | |
| Judge | Richard Andrews | 9 March 1881 | 26 June 1884 | 3 years, 109 days | | |
| Judge | Sir William Bundey | 2 July 1884 | 30 November 1903 | 19 years, 151 days | | |
| Judge | Sir John Gordon | 2 December 1903 | 23 December 1923 | 20 years, 21 days | | |
| Judge | Robert Homburg | 24 February 1905 | 23 March 1912 | 7 years, 28 days | | |
| Judge | Sir George Murray KCMG | 2 April 1913 | 18 February 1942 | 28 years, 322 days | | |
| Judge | Alexander Buchanan | 20 January 1916 | 6 January 1921 | 4 years, 352 days | | |
| Judge | Thomas Poole | 25 September 1919 | 2 May 1927 | 7 years, 219 days | | |
| Judge | Sir Herbert Angas Parsons | 6 January 1921 | 16 June 1945 | 24 years, 161 days | | |
| Judge | Sir Mellis Napier KCMG | 28 February 1924 | 28 February 1967 | 43 years, 0 days | | |
| Judge | Sir Frederick Richards | 23 March 1927 | 6 December 1945 | 18 years, 258 days | | |
| Judge | Arthur William Piper | 16 June 1927 | 19 February 1936 | 8 years, 248 days | | |
| Judge | Edward Erskine Cleland | 5 March 1936 | 1 July 1943 | 7 years, 118 days | | |
| Judge | Sir Herbert Mayo | 30 March 1942 | 30 June 1966 | 24 years, 92 days | | |
| Judge | Sir Geoffrey Reed | 15 July 1943 | 14 March 1962 | 18 years, 242 days | | |
| Judge | Sir George Ligertwood | 12 July 1945 | 14 October 1958 | 13 years, 94 days | | |
| Judge | Sir Charles Abbott | 2 May 1946 | 30 October 1959 | 13 years, 181 days | | |
| Judge | Sir Bruce Ross | 20 November 1952 | 21 May 1963 | 10 years, 182 days | | |
| Judge | Francis Piper | 15 October 1958 | 27 September 1959 | 347 days | | |
| Judge | James Brazel | 16 November 1959 | 23 August 1961 | 1 year, 280 days | | |
| Judge | Sir Roderic Chamberlain | 16 November 1959 | 16 June 1971 | 11 years, 212 days | | |
| Judge | Vivian Millhouse | 26 October 1961 | 24 October 1963 | 1 year, 363 days | | |
| Judge | John Leo Travers (Leo) | 14 May 1962 | 19 October 1969 | 7 years, 158 days | | |
| Judge | David Hogarth | 12 July 1962 | 14 September 1979 | 17 years, 64 days | | |
| Judge | Sir Charles Bright | 24 October 1963 | 15 December 1978 | 15 years, 52 days | | |
| Judge | Dame Roma Mitchell | 23 September 1965 | 1 October 1983 | 18 years, 8 days | | |
| Judge | George Walters | 1 July 1966 | 1 September 1984 | 18 years, 62 days | | |
| Judge | Dr Howard Zelling | 23 October 1969 | 13 August 1986 | 16 years, 294 days | | |
| Judge | Andrew Wells | 21 May 1970 | 8 June 1984 | 14 years, 18 days | | |
| Judge | Keith Sangster | 24 June 1971 | 1 March 1984 | 12 years, 251 days | | |
| Judge | Samuel Jacobs | 17 May 1973 | 4 December 1990 | 17 years, 201 days | | |
| Judge | Len King | 20 June 1975 | 28 April 1995 | 19 years, 312 days | | |
| Judge | Michael White | 15 June 1978 | 2 February 1993 | 14 years, 232 days | | |
| Judge | Christopher Legoe | 29 June 1978 | 22 April 1994 | 15 years, 297 days | | |
| Judge | Brian Cox | 21 December 1978 | 5 February 1999 | 20 years, 46 days | | |
| Judge | Robert Mohr | 21 December 1978 | 28 July 1995 | 16 years, 219 days | | |
| Judge | Roderick Matheson | 9 August 1979 | 4 August 1998 | 18 years, 360 days | | |
| Judge | Donald Williams | 23 March 1980 | 24 September 1982 | 2 years, 185 days | | |
| Judge | Derek Bollen | 4 March 1982 | 27 March 1997 | 15 years, 23 days | | |
| Judge | Robin Millhouse | 7 July 1982 | 8 December 1999 | 17 years, 154 days | | |
| Judge | Elliott Johnston | 28 June 1983 | 26 February 1988 | 4 years, 243 days | | |
| Judge | Graham Prior | 1 March 1984 | 5 July 2004 | 20 years, 126 days | | |
| Judge | Trevor Olsson | 28 June 1984 | 30 July 2001 | 17 years, 32 days | | |
| Judge | Maurice O'Loughlin | 30 August 1984 | 31 July 1989 | 4 years, 335 days | Appointed to the Federal Court | |
| Judge | John von Doussa | 14 August 1986 | 30 November 1988 | 2 years, 108 days | Appointed to the Federal Court | |
| Judge | John Perry | 3 March 1988 | 2 April 2007 | 19 years, 30 days | | |
| Judge | Kevin Duggan AM, RFD | 1 December 1988 | 25 July 2011 | 22 years, 236 days | | |
| Judge | Ted Mullighan | 7 September 1989 | 2 December 2004 | 15 years, 86 days | | |
| Judge | Bruce Debelle | 11 October 1990 | 25 June 2008 | 17 years, 258 days | | |
| Judge | Margaret Nyland | 15 October 1993 | 16 November 2012 | 19 years, 32 days | | |
| Judge | Bruce Lander | 24 November 1994 | 13 July 2003 | 8 years, 231 days | Appointed to the Federal Court | |
| Judge | Tim Williams | 12 September 1995 | 17 April 2003 | 7 years, 217 days | | |
| Judge | David Bleby | 2 April 1997 | 10 June 2011 | 14 years, 69 days | | |
| Judge | David Wicks | 13 August 1998 | 22 August 2003 | 5 years, 9 days | | |
| Judge | Brian Martin | 23 February 1999 | 27 January 2004 | 4 years, 338 days | | |
| Judge | Thomas Gray | 26 April 2000 | 27 February 2016 | 15 years, 307 days | | |
| Judge | Anthony Besanko | 18 October 2001 | 31 March 2006 | 4 years, 164 days | Appointed to the Federal Court | |
| Judge | John Sulan | 3 April 2003 | 21 April 2016 | 13 years, 18 days | | |
| Judge | Ann Vanstone | 21 August 2003 | 13 June 2019 | 15 years, 296 days | Subsequently appointed Independent Commissioner Against Corruption | |
| Judge | Timothy Anderson | 27 November 2003 | 30 June 2014 | 10 years, 215 days | | |
| Judge | Richard Conway White | 6 May 2004 | 30 August 2013 | 9 years, 116 days | Appointed to the Federal Court | |
| Judge | Robyn Ann Layton | 14 February 2005 | 3 September 2010 | 5 years, 201 days | | |
| Judge | Michael David | 6 July 2006 | 25 October 2014 | 8 years, 111 days | | |
| Judge | Patricia Kelly | 18 January 2007 | 30 August 2021 | 14 years, 224 days | | |
| Judge | Chris Kourakis | 21 August 2008 | 18 February 2026 | 17 years, 181 days | | |
| Judge | David Peek | 30 September 2010 | 2 April 2022 | 11 years, 184 days | | |
| Judge | Malcolm Blue | 12 August 2011 | 12 August 2024 | 13 years, 0 days | | |
| Judge | Tim Stanley | 17 August 2011 | | 14 years, 188 days | | |
| Judge | Kevin Nicholson | 19 July 2012 | 27 March 2023 | 10 years, 251 days | | |
| Judge | Anne Bampton | 14 November 2013 | | 12 years, 99 days | | |
| Judge | Greg Parker | 14 November 2013 | March 2022 | 8 years, 118 days | | |
| Judge | David Lovell | 12 February 2015 | 17 February 2025 | 10 years, 5 days | | |
| Judge | Samuel Doyle | December 18, 2015 | | 10 years, 65 days | | |
| Judge | Martin Hinton | 28 April 2016 | 15 November 2019 | 3 years, 201 days | Resigned to become Director of Public Prosecutions for South Australia | |
| Judge | Judith Hughes | 4 July 2017 | | 8 years, 232 days | | |
| Judge | Mark Livesey | 28 January 2020 | | 6 years, 24 days | | |
| Judge | Dr Chris Bleby | 4 May 2020 | | 5 years, 293 days | | |
| Judge | Sophie David | 28 January 2021 | | 5 years, 24 days | | |
| Judge | Laura Stein | 6 September 2021 | | 4 years, 168 days | | |
| Judge | Sandi McDonald | 29 November 2021 | | 4 years, 84 days | | |
| Judge | Adam Kimber | 2 June 2022 | | 3 years, 264 days | | |
| Judge | Julie McIntyre | 1 February 2023 | | 3 years, 20 days | | |
| Judge | Ben Doyle | 20 August 2024 | | 1 year, 185 days | | |
| Judge | Rachel Gray | 18 February 2025 | | 1 year, 3 days | | |
| Judge | Katrina Bochner | 19 February 2026 | | 2 days | | |
| Judge | Kristopher Handshin | 19 February 2026 | | 2 days | | |
| Acting Judge | Henry Jickling | 1837 | 1838 | 0–1 years | | |
| Master | Charles Mann | 1844 | 1849 | 4–5 years | | |
| Master | Henry Jickling | 1850 | 1861 | 10–11 years | | |
| Master | W. Hinde | 1861 | 1878 | 16–17 years | | |
| Master | James Russell | 1878 | 1884 | 5–6 years | | |
| Master | W. D. Scott | 1884 | 1891 | 6–7 years | | |
| Master | Alexander Buchanan | 1891 | 1912 | 20–21 years | | |
| Master | W. L. Stuart | 1913 | 1932 | 18–19 years | | |
| Master | Fred McBryde | 1932 | 1957 | 24–25 years | | |
| Master | K. H. Kirkman | 1957 | 1961 | 3–4 years | | |
| Master | George Walters | 1961 | 1965 | 3–4 years | | |
| Master | William Forster | 1966 | 1971 | 4–5 years | | |
| Master | J. Boehm | 1971 | 1984 | 12–13 years | | |
| Master | Malcolm Teesdale Smith | 1981 | 1985 | 3–4 years | | |
| Master | R. G. Ferrett | 1981 | 1987 | 5–6 years | | |
| Master | Robert Lunn | 1984 | 23 November 2012 | 35–36 years | | |
| Master | David St Leger Kelly | 1985 | | <1 year | | |
| Master | Peter Bowen Pain | 1986 | | <1 year | | |
| Master | Brendan Burley | 1987 | | <1 year | | |
| Master | Brendan Burley | 23 November 2012 | 29 March 2013 | 126 days | | |
| Master | Jeffrey Anderson | 1990 | | <1 year | | |
| Master | Brian Withers | December 2004 | September 2015 | 10–11 years | | |
| Master | Graham Dart | 29 March 2013 | | 12 years, 329 days | | |
| Master | Katrina Bochner | 14 September 2015 | 19 February 2026 | 10 years, 158 days | Appointed Justice | |
| Deputy Master | Fred McBryde | 1921 | 1932 | 10–11 years | | |
| Deputy Master | K. H. Kirkman | 1932 | 1957 | 24–25 years | | |
| Deputy Master | George Walters | 1957 | 1961 | 3–4 years | | |
| Deputy Master | William Forster | 1961 | 1966 | 4–5 years | | |
| Deputy Master | Trevor Olsson | 1963 | 1968 | 4–5 years | | |
| Deputy Master | J. Boehm | 1966 | 1971 | 4–5 years | | |
| Deputy Master | Malcolm Teesdale Smith | 1969 | 1981 | 11–12 years | | |
| Deputy Master | R. G. Ferrett | 1978 | 1981 | 2–3 years | | |
| Deputy Master | Robert Lunn | 1972 | 1984 | 11–12 years | | |

== See also ==
- Judiciary of Australia
