= List of Saint Ignatius' College, Adelaide people =

This is a list of notable alumni and faculty of Saint Ignatius' College, Adelaide.

== Armed services ==
- Major Leonard Roberts-Smith RFD QC, Order of Saint John – Judge Advocate General of the Australian Defence Force, Former Justice of the Supreme Court of Western Australia and Commissioner of the Corruption and Crime Commission of Western Australia..

== Clergy ==
- Gregory O'Kelly SJ – Bishop of Port Pirie.

== Law ==
- John Doyle ('62) – former Chief Justice of the Supreme Court of South Australia.
- Martin Hinton SC – current South Australian Director of Public Prosecutions.
- John Mansfield – former Justice of the Federal Court of Australia.
- Anthony Besanko – Justice of the Federal Court of Australia.
- Major General Len Roberts-Smith – former justice of the Supreme Court of Western Australia.
- Paul Rofe QC ('65)– former South Australian Director of Public Prosecutions (1992-2004).
- Adam Kimber SC ('86) – former South Australian Director of Public Prosecutions (2012-2019).
- John E. Scanlon ('78) – Secretary General of CITES.
- Nicholas Griffin ('15) - Doyles Criminal Law Rising Star - 2023 & 2024 & C Grade Premiership Player OIFC.
- Nicholas 'Healer' Healy - Leading Counsel and coined the phrase "more holes than a Balfour's crumpet".
- Sean Keenihan – Chair of Norman Waterhouse, former South Australian Strategic Adviser on China, and Chair of the South Australian Tourism Commission.

== Media, entertainment and the arts ==
- Benedict Andrews – theatre director.
- Damon Gameau ('93) – actor, Balibo and Underbelly: A Tale of Two Cities
- Ian Henschke – former ABC Stateline presenter; interviewed several participants in the Henry Keogh murder case.
- Chris Kenny – journalist, author, political adviser.
- Christian Kerr – Crikey co-founder, The Australian senior reporter.
- Hugh Sheridan – actor, Packed to the Rafters.
- James Coventry ('99) – ABC Radio Grandstand sports journalist and broadcaster.
- Michael McGuire ('88) – author & The Advertiser journalist.
- Rosanna Mangiarelli ('92) – Seven Network journalist and newsreader.
- Yen Pham (2010) – Rhodes Scholar, journalist, writer, and literary critic.

== Academia, medicine and science ==
- Professor John Warhurst ('65) – ANU Professor, AO – Emeritus Professor, Australian National University. Noted Australian – academic, prominent leader within the Australian Republican Movement. Formerly Professor of Political Science ANU 1993–2008 Author and political commentator.
- Suzanne Le Mire – Professor of Law and former Interim Pro Vice-Chancellor at the University of Adelaide.
- Lauren Skinner (2014) – Rhodes Scholar, Oxford postgraduate researcher, and legal scholar.

== Politics and public service ==
- Michael Armitage – (Lib) former MHA for Adelaide.
- Jack Batty – (Lib) current MHA for Bragg.
- Martin Haese – former Lord Mayor of Adelaide.
- Tom Kenyon – (Lab) former MHA for Newland.
- Terry McRae – (Lab) former MHA for Playford; former Speaker of the House of Assembly.
- Brendan Nelson – (Lib) former MHR for Bradfield; former Leader of the Opposition.
- Christopher Pyne ('84) – (Lib) former MHR for Sturt.
- Olivia Savvas – (Lab) member for Newland.
- Hugh Boylan (2002) – diplomat; Consul-General of Australia in Kolkata.

== Sport ==
- Paul Baccanello – former professional tennis player
- Steven Baldas – former professional tennis player, and 1992 Wimbledon Championships – Boys' doubles Champion
- Daniel Beltrame – former Adelaide United goalkeeper
- Matthew Kelly – Former Australian rules footballer for Norwood (SANFL) and the Adelaide Crows (AFL)
- Jeanette Kieboom – Javelin, represented Australia at both the 1978 and 1986 Commonwealth Games
- Nicole Romeo – former Basketball player
- Damien Nygaard – former Australian rules footballer for Norwood (SANFL), West Perth (WAFL) and South Australia (State)
- Taylor Ortlepp ('15)– basketball and AFLW player
- Tom Warhurst (74') – former Australian rules footballer for Norwood (SANFL) and the Adelaide Crows (AFL)

== Rectors ==
- Fr A Dando SJ (1951–53)
- Fr T Costello SJ (1954–59)
- Fr T Bourke SJ (1960–66)
- Fr F Wallace SJ (1967–72)
- Fr P Hosking SJ (1973–75)
- Fr P Hosking SJ (1973–77)
- Fr G O'Kelly SJ (1976–78)
- Fr T Kelly SJ (1978–80)
- Fr N Olsen SJ (1981) (Vice Rector)
- Fr T Kelly SJ (1982–83)
- Fr J Hawkins SJ (1984–88)
- Fr P.B. Mullins SJ (1988–97)
- Fr C Middleton SJ (1998–2002)
- Fr M Head SJ (2003)
- Fr PB Mullins SJ (2004–09)
- Fr J McLain SJ (2010–12)
- Fr PB Mullins SJ (2013)
- Fr R Davoren SJ (2014–2017)
- Fr P Hosking SJ (2018–)

== Headmasters/Principals ==
- Fr T Perrott SJ (1951–53)
- Fr T Barden SJ (1954–61)
- Fr J McArearvey SJ (1962–64)
- Fr F Wallace SJ (1965–72)
- Fr P Hosking SJ (1973–77)
- Fr G O'Kelly SJ (1978–81)
- Fr N Olsen SJ (1982–86)
- Fr M Ryan SJ (1987–94)
- Fr G O'Kelly SJ (1994–2006)
- Fr R Davoren SJ (2007–13)
- Mr P Coffey (2018–22)
- Ms Barbara Watkins (2023)
- Ms Lauren Brooks (2024–)

Head of Senior School

- Mr P Coffey (2014–2017)
- Mr P Donato (2018–)

Head of Junior School

- Mr W Armitage (1992–2008)
- Mr S Fitzpatrick (2009–2017)
- Mr N Boys (2018–)
