= Laura Stein =

Australian judge

The Honourable Chief Justice Laura Stein

Chief Justice of the Supreme Court of South Australia
- Incumbent
- Assumed office 19 February 2026
- Preceded by: Chris Kourakis

Justice of the Supreme Court of South Australia
- Incumbent
- Assumed office 6 September 2021
- Preceded by: Patricia Kelly

Administrator of the State of South Australia
- In office 19 October 2026 – 21 October 2026
- Monarch: Charles III
- Premier: Peter Malinauskas
- Governor: Vacant

Personal details
- Born: Laura Grace Stein

Laura Grace Stein is an Australian lawyer and judge. She has been Chief Justice of South Australia in the Supreme Court of South Australia since 19 February 2026. She is the first woman to be appointed to the role.

== Early life and education ==
Laura Stein grew up in Johannesburg, South Africa. She moved with her family to Adelaide in 1978. She graduated from Unley High School.

Stein completed a degree in law and economics at the University of Adelaide, with a 1988 honours thesis on tax deductibility laws. She was a judge's associate to High Court justice Michael McHugh in 1990.

== Career ==
Stein began practising as a lawyer in 1991 at Fisher Jeffries, where she stayed for ten years, eventually becoming an equity partner.

In 2001, Stein was appointed to the Crown Solicitor's Office as an Executive Solicitor. She was promoted to Special counsel in 2017 and Assistant Crown Solicitor in 2018 and headed the Civil Litigation division. She was appointed Crown Solicitor in 2020, the third woman to hold the role. She oversaw the government's disputes in the building of the new Royal Adelaide Hospital as well as the development of emergency laws during the COVID-19 pandemic.

Stein is a member of the Legal Practitioners Education and Admission Council and the Audit and Risk Management Committee of the Courts Administration Authority.

=== Judicial career ===
In September 2021, Stein was appointed to the Supreme Court of South Australia. She chairs the court's special classification trial management committee and the respectful behaviours committee's steering committee, and belongs to the workplace conduct committee.

Stein was sworn in as Chief Justice by Governor Frances Adamson on 19 February 2026, succeeding Chris Kourakis. Stein was sworn in on a Bible that belonged to Australia's first female judge and governor, South Australian Dame Roma Mitchell. Attorney General Kyam Maher said of her appointment, "Justice Stein’s leadership role in building cultural change in the legal profession, following the Equal Opportunity Commissioner’s report on bullying and harassment, makes her uniquely well-placed to lift standards across the profession as Chief Justice."

Legal offices
Preceded by Michael Wait	Crown Solicitor of South Australia; 2020 – 2021	Succeeded by Ingrid Norman
Preceded by Chris Kourakis	Chief Justice of South Australia; 2012 – 2026	Incumbent
