= Anne Bampton =

Australian lawyer

The Honourable Justice Anne Bampton

Judge of the Supreme Court of South Australia
- Incumbent
- Assumed office 14 November 2013

Personal details
- Born: 1961 or 1962 (age 63–64)
- Occupation: Judge, lawyer

Anne Bampton (born 1961 or 1962) is an Australian lawyer, who was a judge of the District Court of South Australia from 2010 until 2013 when she was appointed to the Supreme Court of South Australia.

== Career ==
Bampton was admitted as a legal practitioner in 1985. In 2006 she was appointed a Master of the Supreme Court. In February 2010 Bampton was appointed a judge of the District Court.

=== Supreme Court of South Australia ===
Bampton was appointed to the Supreme Court in November 2013. Bampton has sat on a number of high-profile cases, including finding that Cy Walsh was not guilty of the murder of his father Phil Walsh because he was mentally incompetent. Bampton was a member of the Full Court of the Supreme Court that dismissed an appeal against a redistribution of the electoral districts of South Australia.

== Drink driving ==
On Saturday 30 November 2013, shortly after Bampton's appointment to the Supreme Court, she was driving after consuming alcohol when she hit and injured a cyclist at Glenside. A breath test indicated that Bampton had a blood alcohol content of 0.121%, a category 2 offence, and was immediately disqualified from driving for six months. Bampton pleaded guilty to driving with excess blood alcohol and driving without due care, was fined $1,300, plus court costs of $260 and disqualified from driving for a further eight months and 14 days.

Bampton was the fourth Australian judge to commit a drink driving offence, after District Court (SA) judge Neal Hume (2002), Supreme Court (NSW) judge Jeff Shaw (2004), and acting Judge of Appeal (NSW) Roderick Howie (2011). Hume and Shaw resigned their commissions while Howie's acting commission was allowed to lapse. In South Australia a judge can only be removed by the Governor upon the address of both Houses of the Parliament. Bampton did not resign nor did the Parliament seek her removal. The Chief Justice Chris Kourakis decided that for twelve months Bampton would not be allocated to cases involving a driving offence nor where an offender was "materially affected by alcohol".

Subsequently, NSW Court of Appeal Judge Anthony Meagher was found to be driving with a blood alcohol content of 0.053%, however he too remained on the bench.
