= Crown Solicitor =

Crown Solicitor may refer to:

- Commonwealth Crown Solicitor, the former name of the Australian Government Solicitor
  - Crown Solicitor for New South Wales
  - Crown Solicitor of South Australia
- Crown Solicitor of Hong Kong, the former name of the Law Officer (Civil Law) of Hong Kong
- The Crown Solicitor Network, a network of lawyers in private practice who prosecute for the New Zealand Crown Law Office
- Crown Solicitor for Northern Ireland
