= Kourakis =

Kourakis (Greek: Κουράκης) is a Greek surname. It is the surname of:

- Chris Kourakis (born 1958), Greek-Australian lawyer and Chief Justice of the Supreme Court of South Australia.
- Tasos Kourakis (1948–2021), Greek cardiologist and Education minister of Greece.
