= Chris Kourakis =

Australian judge

The Honourable Chris Kourakis AC

Chief Justice of the Supreme Court of South Australia
- In office 25 June 2012 – 19 February 2026
- Preceded by: John Doyle
- Succeeded by: Laura Stein

Judge of the Supreme Court of South Australia
- Incumbent
- Assumed office 21 August 2008
- Preceded by: Bruce Debelle

Solicitor-General of South Australia
- In office 3 February 2003 – 2008
- Preceded by: Bradley Selway QC
- Succeeded by: Martin Hinton QC

Personal details
- Born: Christopher John Kourakis; 17 June 1958 (age 68) Port Lincoln, South Australia

Christopher John Kourakis AC (born 17 June 1958) is a Greek Australian lawyer and judge. He was Chief Justice of South Australia from 2012 until February 2026. In August 2026 he was appointed commissioner of the Victorian royal commission into corruption in the construction industry.

== Early life and education ==
Christopher John Kourakis was born on 17 June 1958. He grew up in Port Lincoln as one of ten children of Greek migrants Evangelos and Roxani Kourakis. His parents originated from the Greek island of Ikaria.

He graduated from the University of Adelaide with a bachelor of laws in 1981.

== Career ==
Kourakis was admitted to practice in 1982, and was called to the bar in 1987. He practised at the Independent Bar in South Australia from 1989 and was appointed Queen's Counsel in 1997. In 2003 he was appointed as the Solicitor-General of South Australia .

When the South Australian Government decided to cease appointing Queen's Counsel and the Chief Justice of South Australia began appointing Senior Counsel, Kourakis resigned his commission as Queen's Counsel to become Senior Counsel instead.

In 2008, Kourakis was appointed to the Supreme Court of South Australia and in 2012, he was elevated to the position of Chief Justice.

In August 2022, he overturned a decision by the former Premier of South Australia, Steven Marshall, to allow for exploratory mining to go ahead on Lake Torrens, citing concerns that Kelaray's heritage plan and procedures would "substantially detract" from the Aboriginal Heritage Act 1988. In May 2023, the Premier's decision was reinstated by the Court of Appeal of South Australia.

In February 2023, together with Attorney-General of South Australia Kyam Maher, Kourakis announced several new appointments to the SA judicial system. Among the appointees were the first two Aboriginal Australians to be appointed to the Magistrates Court of South Australia, Lana Chester and Natalie Brown.

On 11 November 2025 he submitted his resignation to the Governor of South Australia, announcing his intention to retire effective on 19 February 2026. He is to be succeeded by Laura Stein, who will be the first woman in the role.

He was appointed a Companion of the Order of Australia in the 2026 Australia Day Honours for "eminent service to the judiciary, to the law and to legal reform, to social justice and gender equity, to the Greek community, and to education".

== Victorian construction royal commission ==
On 20 August 2026, Victorian Premier Ben Carroll named Kourakis to head a royal commission into corruption in Victoria's major public infrastructure construction projects. It has a $50 million budget and reports by 20 August 2027.

== Other activities ==
Kourakis was elected president of the Law Society of South Australia in 2001.

Legal offices
Preceded by Bradley Selway QC	Solicitor-General of South Australia; 2003 – 2008	Succeeded by Martin Hinton QC
Preceded by John Doyle	Chief Justice of South Australia; 2012 – 2026	Succeeded by Laura Stein
