= Horton Williams =

Australian judge

Horton Clement Williams
- Born: 21 April 1933; Sydney
- Died: 17 December 2020 (aged 87); Adelaide, South Australia
- Education: Newington College; University of Adelaide
- Occupations: Solicitor, barrister, queen's counsel, judge
- Title: The Honourable Horton Williams QC
- Spouse(s): 1958, Helen (died 1991); 1996, Marie Gregory
- Children: 1 son, 1 daughter
- Parent: H R Williams

The Honourable Horton Clement Williams QC (21 April 1933 – 17 December 2020) was a judge of the Supreme Court of South Australia who retired in 2003.

== Early life ==
Williams was born in Sydney and attended Newington College (1947–1950). In 1950 his family moved to South Australia and he enrolled at the University of Adelaide and graduated in law.

== Legal career ==
Williams was a Judge's Associate from 1954 until 1956 and was admitted to the South Australian Bar in 1955. From 1956 until 1977 he was in private practice. He was appointed Queen's Counsel in 1974.

In 1995, he was appointed as the inaugural presiding member of South Australia's Gaming Supervisory Authority, the supervising regulator for the Adelaide Casino and licensed gaming machine premises, effective 1 July 1995. Williams resigned this position on 31 August 1995 to accept appointment as a Justice of the State's Supreme Court. He retired in 2003 and died in 2020.

Other legal positions held included chairman of the Judicial Conference of Australia, vice-president of the Australian Bar Association and president of the South Australian Bar Association.

== Community involvement ==
Williams was Commodore of the Royal South Australian Yacht Squadron from 1991 until 1993.
