= John Doyle (judge) =

Australian judge

The Honourable Chief Justice John Doyle AC KC

Chief Justice of South Australia
- In office 4 May 1995 – 22 June 2012
- Preceded by: Len King
- Succeeded by: Chris Kourakis

Acting Justice of the Supreme Court of the Northern Territory
- In office 2000–2001

Pro-Chancellor of Flinders University
- In office 1988–2000 Serving with Avon Maxwell Clark (1988–1991), Ronald David Barnes (1992–1998), Ian Arthur Chesterman (1998–2000)
- Chancellor: Deirdre Jordan
- Preceded by: Avon Maxwell Clark
- Succeeded by: Ian Arthur Chesterman; Judith Mary Roberts

Solicitor-General of South Australia
- In office 1986–1995
- Preceded by: Malcolm Gray QC
- Succeeded by: Bradley Selway QC

Personal details
- Born: John Jeremy Doyle; 4 January 1945 (age 81) Adelaide, South Australia
- Education: University of Adelaide; Magdalen College, Oxford

The Hon. Chief Justice John Jeremy Doyle, AC KC (born 4 January 1945) is an Australian jurist and was the Chief Justice of the Supreme Court of South Australia, the highest ranking court in the Australian State of South Australia, between 1995 and 2012.

== Early life and education ==
Doyle was educated at Saint Ignatius College, South Australia, and was dux of the college in 1962. He went on to graduate in law from the University of Adelaide in 1966 and was awarded a Rhodes Scholarship in 1967, completing his studies in law at Magdalen College, Oxford, in 1969.

== Career ==
In the following year he was admitted to the bar in South Australia.

Before being elevated to the position of chief justice in 1995, Doyle served as the Solicitor-General of South Australia from 1986 to 1995, where he was highly regarded for his skills as an advocate, particularly in complex constitutional cases. On a number of occasions, most recently in 1998, speculation surfaced that he may become the first South Australian to be appointed to the High Court of Australia; however, an appointment never eventuated. He was a founding member of Hanson Chambers and, immediately prior to his move to the independent bar, was a partner at Adelaide law firm, Kelly & Co.

Doyle is a fervent supporter of the Norwood Football Club in the South Australian National Football League.

During his time as Chief Justice, Doyle was appointed as an Acting Judge of the Supreme Court of the Northern Territory in 2000 to hear an appeal concerning the appointment of the then Northern Territory Chief Magistrate Hugh Bradley.

On 30 April 2012, Doyle announced his retirement as Chief Justice, which took effect on 22 June 2012. He was succeeded as Chief Justice by Chris Kourakis.

== See also ==
- Judiciary of Australia

Legal offices
Preceded by Malcolm Gray QC	Solicitor-General of South Australia; 1986 – 1995	Succeeded by Bradley Selway QC
Preceded by Len King	Chief Justice of South Australia; 1995 - 2012	Succeeded by Chris Kourakis
