= Margaret Nyland =

Australian lawyer (born 1942)

The Honourable Justice Margaret Nyland AM

Judge of the Supreme Court of South Australia
- In office 15 October 1993 – 16 November 2012

Personal details
- Born: Adelaide, South Australia
- Education: Gilles Street Primary School; Adelaide Girls High School; University of Adelaide
- Occupation: Judge, lawyer

Margaret Jean Nyland AM is an Australian lawyer, who was a judge of the Supreme Court of South Australia from 1993 to 2012, and before that a judge of the District Court of South Australia from 1987 to 1993.

== Early life and education ==
Nyland was born in Adelaide, South Australia. Her mother was an egg wiper, later becoming a tent, sail and flag maker. Her father, John Johnson (Jack) Nyland was a boilermaker then taxi driver, later becoming the State Secretary of the Transport Workers Union (SA).

Nyland attended Gilles Street Primary School and the Adelaide Girls High School. Nyland had determined her choice of career at a young age, writing "lawyer" on each occasion the school asked to list her intended occupation. She received a Commonwealth Scholarship, enabling her to study law at the University of Adelaide, where one of her lecturers was Roma Mitchell. She graduated with a Bachelor of Laws in 1965 and was one of three women admitted as legal practitioners in 1965.

== Career ==
To be admitted as a solicitor, Nyland required both a law degree and a period as an articled clerk and she had difficulty finding someone to take her, eventually being taken on by Pam Cleland. Nyland later entered into a law partnership with Cleland, before going into partnership with David Haines QC in the firm Nyland, Haines & Co which specialised in family law.

Nyland was the chair of the Commonwealth Social Security Appeals Tribunal from 1975 until 1987, chair of the South Australian Sex Discrimination Board from 1985 until 1987 and then deputy chair of the Equal Opportunity Tribunal (SA). In 1987 Nyland became only the second woman to be appointed to the District Court of South Australia.

=== Supreme Court of South Australia ===
In 1993, Nyland was elevated to the Supreme Court. South Australia was the first commonwealth jurisdiction to appoint a woman to the Supreme Court when Roma Mitchell was appointed in 1965. Mitchell retired as Dame Roma in 1983, and it took a further ten years before the second woman, Nyland, was appointed to the Supreme Court.

Nyland was the judge in a number of high-profile criminal trials, including that of Michelle Burgess and Kevin Matthews for the murder of Carolyn Matthews, Mark Errin Rust for the murders of Maya Jakic and Megumi Suzuki, and sentencing a teenager for the murder of Pirjo Kemppainen.

By 2005, two more women had been appointed to the Supreme Court, Ann Vanstone and Robyn Layton. Together they formed the first all female Court of Criminal Appeal in South Australia.

Nyland retired from the Supreme Court in November 2012 as a result of reaching the statutory retirement age of 70.

After her retirement from the Supreme Court, Nyland was appointed in August 2014 to conduct the Child Protection Systems Royal Commission, to investigate the adequacy of the child protection system in South Australia.

== Honours ==
Nyland was made a Member of the Order of Australia "For service to the judiciary, to human rights and the equal status of women, and to the community through a range of cultural organisations" on 26 January 2005.
