= Roma Mitchell =

Australian judge (1913–2000)

The Honourable Dame Roma Mitchell AC DBE CVO QC
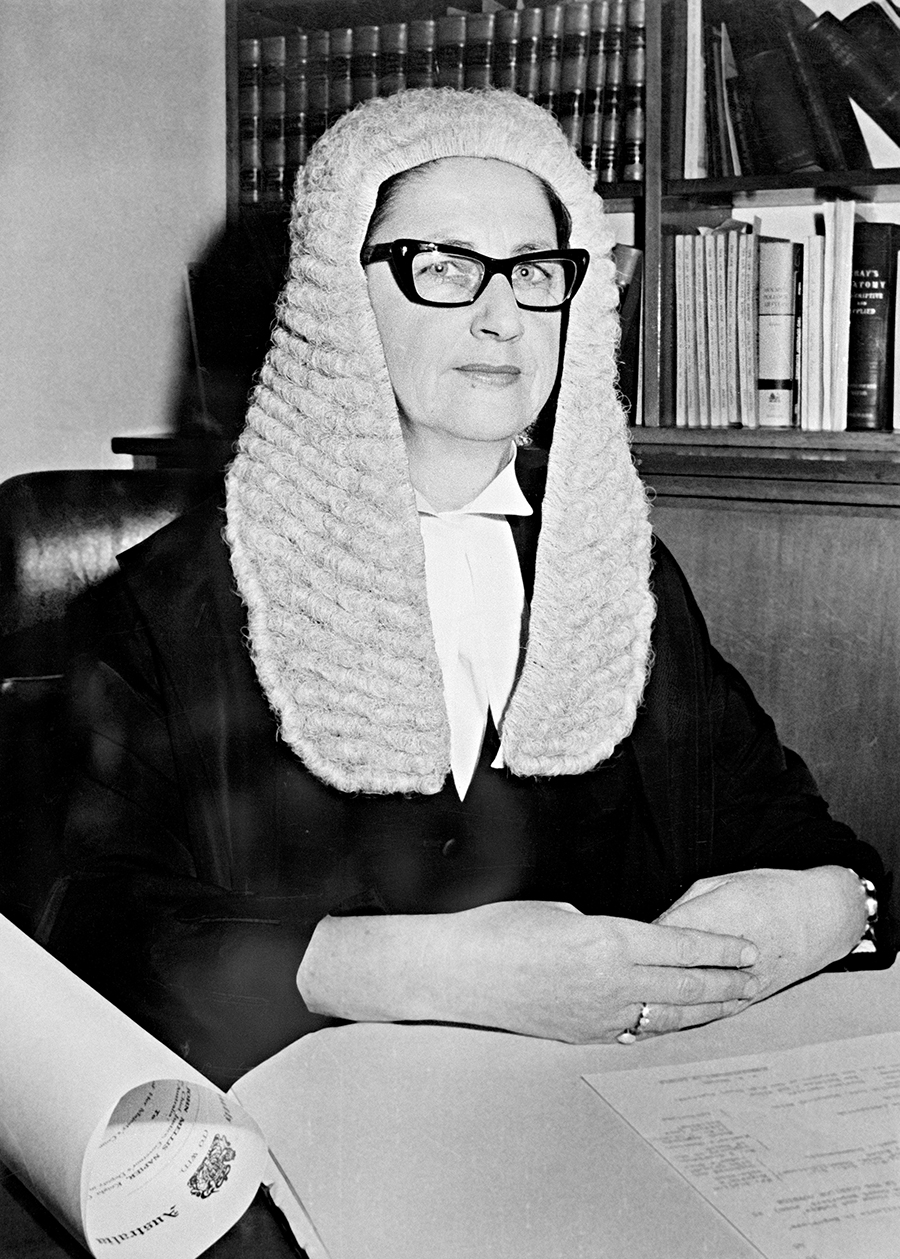
- Mitchell in 1965

31st Governor of South Australia
- In office 6 February 1991 – 21 July 1996
- Monarch: Elizabeth II
- Premier: John Bannon (1991–1992); Lynn Arnold (1992–1993); Dean Brown (1993–1996)
- Lieutenant: Condor Laucke (1991–1992); Basil Hetzel (1992–1996)
- Preceded by: Donald Dunstan
- Succeeded by: Eric Neal

10th Chancellor of the University of Adelaide
- In office 1 November 1983 – 1990
- Deputy: Harry Medlin (1983–1990); Sam Jacobs (1984–1990)
- Preceded by: John Bray
- Succeeded by: William Scammell

Deputy Chancellor of the University of Adelaide
- In office February 1972 – 1982
- Chancellor: John Jefferson Bray
- Preceded by: Frank Hambly
- Succeeded by: Harry Medlin

Chair of the Human Rights Commission
- In office 10 December 1981 – 9 December 1986
- Preceded by: Office established
- Succeeded by: Marcus Einfeld

Judge of the Supreme Court of South Australia
- In office 23 September 1965 – 1 October 1983
- Nominated by: Edric Bastyan
- Appointed by: Frank Walsh

Personal details
- Born: Roma Alma Flinders Mitchell; 2 October 1913 North Adelaide, South Australia
- Died: 5 March 2000 (aged 86) St Andrew's Hospital, South Australia
- Relations: Samuel Mitchell (grandfather)
- Education: University of Adelaide (LLB)
- Profession: Barrister; judge

Dame Roma Alma Flinders Mitchell (2 October 1913 – 5 March 2000) was an Australian barrister and judge. She became the first woman appointed as a judge in Australia in 1965, the first woman appointed Queen's Counsel (QC) in 1962, the first female chancellor of an Australian university from 1983 to 1990, and the first woman to serve as governor of an Australian state from 1991 to 1996.

Mitchell was born on 2 October 1913 in North Adelaide, the youngest daughter of solicitor Harold Flinders Mitchell and Maude Imelda Mitchell. After her father's death in World War I, she was raised by her mother and excelled academically at St Aloysius College, becoming dux and achieving top marks in French and Latin. In 1931, she entered the University of Adelaide's law school, graduating with a Bachelor of Laws in 1934. During her studies, she co-founded the Women's Law Students' Club and received the David Murray Fellowship for her academic excellence.

Mitchell was admitted to the bar in 1934 and began her legal career at Rollison & Rollison, quickly rising to partner. She was a pioneering advocate for women's rights, campaigning for equal custody, equal pay, and the inclusion of women on juries in South Australia. In 1962, she became Australia's first female QC and in 1965 the first woman judge in the country. She chaired key legal reform committees, contributed to criminal law and penal reform, and led the Royal Commission on Police Dismissal in 1978. Mitchell also served in academic and human rights roles, including deputy chancellor of the University of Adelaide, and later chair of the Human Rights Commission, addressing issues from discrimination to Indigenous rights.

In 1983, Mitchell served briefly as South Australia's first female acting Chief Justice before retiring from the judiciary. She remained active in public life, serving as chancellor of the University of Adelaide from 1983 to 1990 and conducting inquiries on human rights and social justice. In 1991, she became Australia's first female state governor, holding the vice-regal office until 1996 and promoting gender equality, education, and community engagement. Mitchell continued her advocacy through campaigns, boards, and foundations, attending constitutional conventions and supporting Indigenous and women's rights. She died from bone cancer on 5 March 2000, and her state funeral was attended by hundreds.

== Early life and education ==
Roma Alma Flinders Mitchell was born on 2 October 1913 at Quambi Nursing Home on Pennington Terrace, North Adelaide, the second daughter and youngest child of Harold Flinders Mitchell, a solicitor, and his wife Maude Imelda (née Wickham) Mitchell. Her father was killed in battle in France in April 1918 while serving with the First Australian Imperial Force, leaving Maude to raise their two daughters. His death placed financial strain on the family, as her untrained mother struggled to support her children. After Mitchell's birth, the family lived in Renmark on the River Murray before returning to North Adelaide, where they resided on Hill Street across the Adelaide Park Lands from Medindie.

Mitchell was educated at St Aloysius College from 1920 to 1930. Her mother had withdrawn her and her sister from St Dominic's Priory School and enrolled them at St Aloysius. The family later moved to Kyre Avenue, Kingswood, near the foothills of the Mount Lofty Ranges. Taught to read at home before starting school, Mitchell excelled academically, ranking as her school's top academic student in 1928 and 1929, and placing first in South Australia in French in 1929 and Latin in 1930, after repeating her final year, as her mother considered her too young to attend university. In 1931 she entered the University of Adelaide's law school, graduating with a Bachelor of Laws in December 1934. During her studies, she co-founded the Women's Law Students' Club after being excluded from the all-male Law Students' Society, serving as its secretary in 1934 and winning its debate award in 1933 and 1934. She was awarded the David Murray Fellowship in recognition of her academic distinction.

== Legal career ==
=== Early career (1935–1962) ===
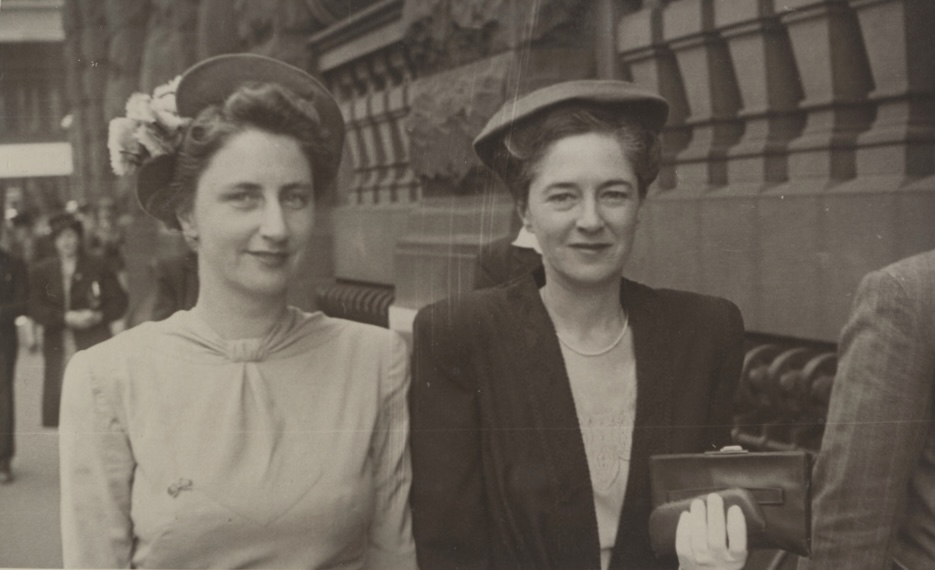
Roma and Ruth Mitchell, presumably in Adelaide, c. 1936

Mitchell was admitted to the bar in 1934 and formally admitted as a barrister and lawyer by the Supreme Court of South Australia in December, three days after completing her studies. She began her articles of clerkship with Rollison & Rollison, assisted by her uncle, lawyer Frank Villeneuve Smith, but later moved to a larger firm that could hire a professional solicitor. Four months after joining, she was promoted to partner at the firm, which became Nelligan, Angas Parsons & Mitchell. She was also active in campaigns, including the 1940 fight for equal custody rights, which held that a mother should have the same authority over children as the father. Equal pay for equal effort was another cause she supported.

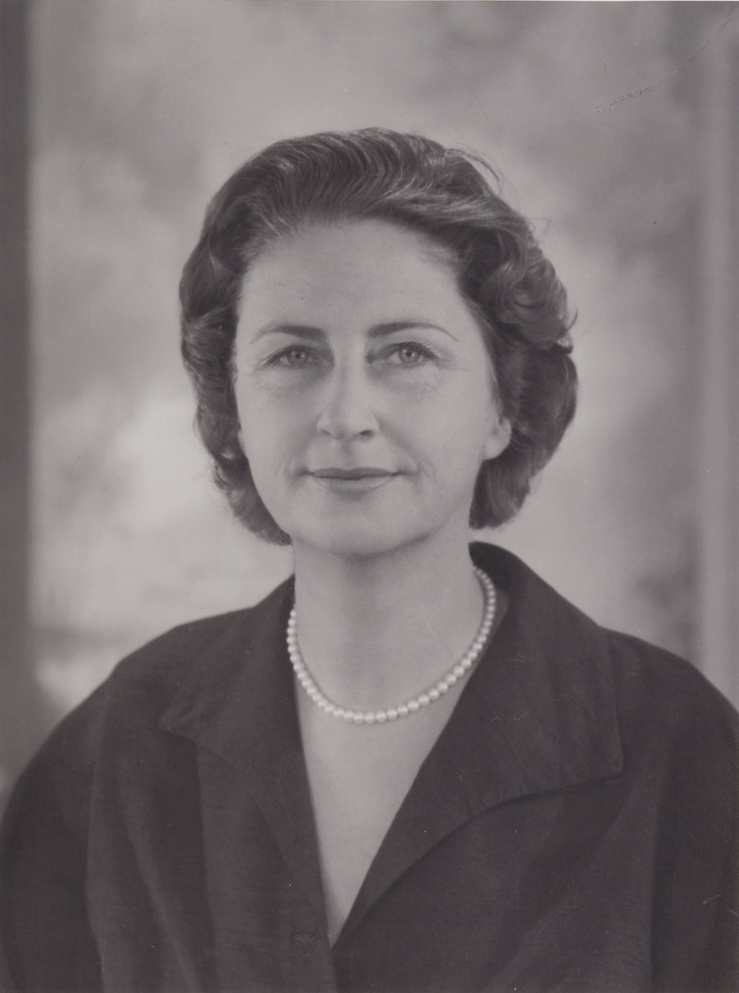
Portrait of Mitchell, c. 1954

Early in her legal career, Mitchell undertook little work in the criminal division, believing that, as a woman in a predominantly male court, she might be perceived as an oddity, potentially disadvantaging her clients. She led initiatives through the National Council of Women and the League of Women Voters. She handled domestic violence cases decisively, as recalled by Len King, who was articled to her in 1948–49. In 1951, she and lawyer Sesca Zelling defied a male-only directive to attend the jubilee supper at the federal legal conference in Sydney.

Mitchell was elected to the Law Society of South Australia's council in 1952. She joined its legal assistance committee, contributing to systems later influential in Britain after presenting the South Australian programme at the 1954 Commonwealth and Empire Law Conference in London. In 1958, she became the first part-time family law instructor at the University of Adelaide, where she mentored students including Margaret Nyland.

In 1960, Mitchell led a renewed and ultimately successful campaign to allow women in South Australia to serve on juries. In 1962, she led a delegation representing seven women's organisations to Premier Thomas Playford IV, carefully presenting arguments in favour of women's inclusion. She highlighted the issue of unequal pay for government employees and argued that women jurors could assess certain witnesses, particularly in sex crime cases, with greater objectivity. Her efforts led to Playford's agreement to permit women jurors, a reform implemented three years later.

=== Queen's Counsel (1962–1981) ===
On 20 September 1962, Mitchell became the first woman in Australia appointed Queen's Counsel and established a law firm with David Haese and Doreen Curnow, later joined by Ted Mullighan, increasingly taking on court work for women affected by domestic violence, deserted wives, and those without means of support. She was appointed vice-president of the Law Council of Australia in 1963 and was expected to become its first female president. In 1965, however, attorney-general Don Dunstan offered her a position on the South Australian Supreme Court, and on 23 September 1965, Mitchell became the first woman judge in Australia.

Mitchell later described judicial life as offering "no excitement"; she accepted the appointment out of a sense of moral obligation and a belief that she owed it to women. Her appointment attracted public attention, including debate over forms of address, and she received 482 letters and telegrams of congratulation. Mitchell took her seat on the Full Court on 27 September 1965, delivering remarks referencing President John F. Kennedy's inaugural address. She heard criminal and civil cases at both first instance and on appeal. In the same year, she became a member of the University of Adelaide council.

In 1971, Mitchell began chairing the Criminal Law and Penal Methods Reform Committee of South Australia, later known as the Mitchell Committee, a role she held until 1977. The committee issued five reports containing 907 recommendations. It advocated for judges and magistrates to retain responsibility for sentencing rather than leaving it to legislation, and emphasised the need for jurists and police to be better informed on criminology and correctional systems. Mitchell also delivered the Sir John Morris Memorial Lecture in 1971 on "Women's Liberation and the Law".

In 1972, Mitchell was appointed the first woman deputy chancellor of the University of Adelaide, a position she held until her later elevation to chancellor.

The Mitchell Committee's 1973 report addressed the neglect and mistreatment of Aboriginal peoples, recommending the abolition of minor offences, establishment of detoxification centres, and replacement of short-term imprisonment with supervised prohibition, as well as improved care for inmates.

From 1974 to 1981, Mitchell served as chair of the parole board. In 1975, she became the first woman to present the Australian Broadcasting Commission's Boyer Lectures. Titled The Web of Criminal Law, the lectures presented key aspects of the Mitchell Committee's work to a national audience.

The committee's 1977 report on rape recommended that husbands be indictable for the rape of a wife in cases of separation, and highlighted the outdated assumption that a wife must submit to intercourse regardless of her wishes.

In 1978, Mitchell was appointed to lead the Royal Commission on Dismissal from the Office of the Commissioner of Police, known as the Salisbury Commission, to determine whether Commissioner Harold Salisbury had misled the government, whether his dismissal was justified, and whether the Crown's prerogative to dismiss the commissioner required modification. She submitted her report on 30 May 1978, concluding that Salisbury had misled the government, that his dismissal was justified, and that the dismissal power should be modified. That same year, she became chairman of the South Australian State Heritage Committee.

== Later life ==
=== Judicial retirement and public service (1981–1990) ===
From 1981 until 1990, Mitchell served on the council for the Order of Australia. She was also appointed inaugural chair of the Human Rights Commission under the Fraser government, taking office when the Human Rights Commission Act commenced on 10 December 1981. She held the position in a part-time capacity.

The commission brought together representatives from across the states to address complaints concerning women, Indigenous peoples, ethnic minorities, and people with disabilities, focusing on inquiry, conciliation, and education rather than prosecution. Mitchell addressed issues of racial intolerance, particularly in Western Australia and the Northern Territory, and contributed to developing distinctions in the treatment of mental illness and intellectual disability. In 1983, the commission supported the sex discrimination bill introduced by Susan Ryan.

In 1983, Mitchell became the first woman to serve as acting Chief Justice of South Australia, holding the position for a few months. As a resident appeal court judge, she worked alongside colleagues including Harry Gibbs. On 28 September, King spoke at a special session of the South Australian Supreme Court to mark her departure from the bench. She retired from the court on 1 October 1983, following eleven unsuccessful attempts to have her appointed to the High Court of Australia.

Following her retirement from the judiciary, Mitchell was appointed chancellor of the University of Adelaide in succession to John Jefferson Bray on 1 November 1983. She was also the first woman to hold the office of chancellor in an Australian university. After retiring from the bench, Mitchell continued her involvement in public service through organisations like the Ryder-Cheshire Foundation and the Winston Churchill Memorial Trust. Also, she worked in the community by delivering the Meals on Wheels lunch service for senior citizens, along with her friend Billie Whyte.

Between 1984 and 1986, during the Hawke government, Mitchell conducted a judicial inquiry with royal commission powers to determine compensation for Greek migrants wrongly accused of social security fraud. During her chairmanship, the Human Rights Commission also responded to opposition to immigration following public commentary by historian Geoffrey Blainey.

The term as chair for Mitchell was completed on 9 December 1986, as the Human Rights Commission came to an end by the provision of the sunset clause contained within its establishment legislation. The Human Rights and Equal Opportunity Commission then took its place.

Mitchell began her second term as chancellor in 1988 and remained in office until 1990, when she resigned following her appointment as governor of South Australia.

=== Governor of South Australia (1991–1996) ===
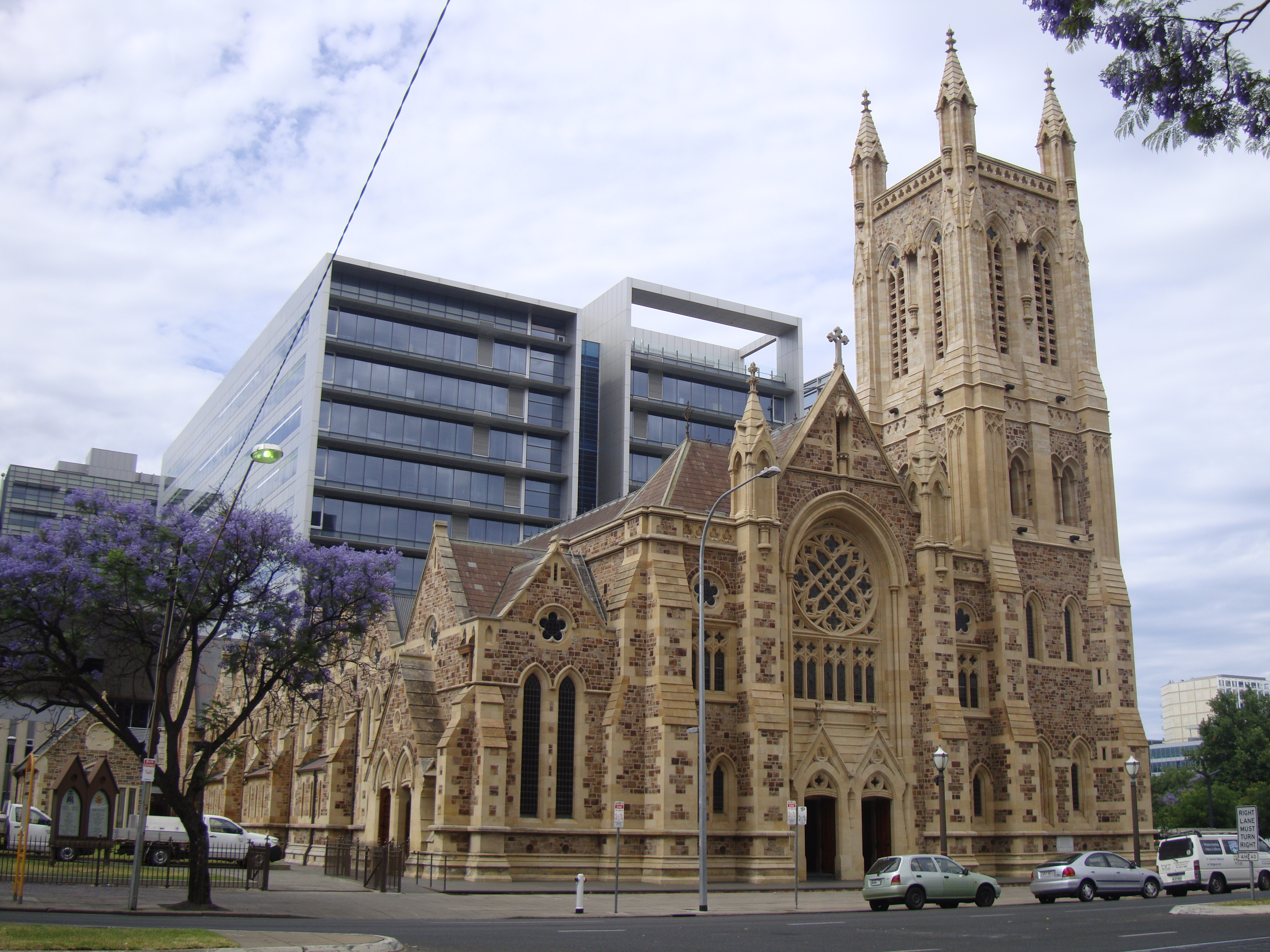
St Francis Xavier's Cathedral viewed from across Wakefield Street in 2012

Appointed by John Bannon's government, Mitchell became governor on 6 February 1991, making her the first woman in Australia to hold a vice-regal office. On 18 April 1991, she ceremoniously granted the University of South Australia's charter. In her 1993 Phillip Hughes Oration in Hobart, Mitchell reflected on the prejudice she and her contemporaries faced as women in their professions, advocating for affirmative action to prevent gender-based detriment rather than to give women preference over men. In 1994, she served as patron for the centennial celebration of women's suffrage in South Australia.

On 13 January 1996, Mitchell opened the rebuilt Beacon Hill Lookout in Robe as part of the town's sesquicentenary celebrations. In April, she accompanied Governor-General William Deane on a tour of the Clare Valley during his first official engagements outside Canberra. On 11 July, she participated in the dedication service for St Francis Xavier's Cathedral. Her term as governor ended on 21 July, and Eric Neal succeeded her the following day.

=== Final years (1996–1999) ===
In 1996, Mitchell became chair of the South Australian Ministerial Board on Ageing, a position she held until her death. That following year, she supported the Women for Wik campaign, which endorsed the High Court's Wik decision.

In 1998, Mitchell represented South Australia at the constitutional convention in Canberra. During the proceedings, she suggested that the titles "Governor-General" should be retained for the national head of state in case Australia turned into a republic. This is because she believed that retaining the titles "Governor-General" and "Governor" would better represent the constitutional sovereignty of the states. She was also one of the original trustees of the Don Dunstan Foundation.

In October 1999, Mitchell visited Glenelg to commission the Australian Customs Vessel Holdfast Bay. Two months later, she presided over a debate at the University of Adelaide titled "That Ideology Is Dead".

== Death and funeral ==
Mitchell died of bone cancer on 5 March 2000 at St Andrew's Hospital, Adelaide. Her televised state funeral at St Francis Xavier's Cathedral was among the largest held there. Hundreds attended, with additional mourners accommodated in marquees outside. Speakers included senior representatives of the Catholic and Anglican churches, the Salvation Army, and the Lutheran Church. She was cremated.

Political leaders, (Note: Prime Minister John Howard was among the political figures who expressed their condolences.) colleagues, community groups and the media paid tribute to Mitchell's contribution to justice and equality. Bannon highlighted her role in social reform, Neal praised her wisdom and humanity, and Archbishop Leonard Faulkner spoke of her faith and moral example.

== Personal life ==
Mitchell was a fourth-generation South Australian. Her grandfather, Samuel James Mitchell, had served as a Northern Territory government resident and a judge in South Australia. She maintained a close relationship with her mother and remained in mourning following her death in 1938. Mitchell's Catholic and Irish working-class heritage contrasted with her attainment of senior positions in a predominantly Protestant establishment, and she valued her imperial honours. She was also the godmother of Martin Haese, who served as Lord Mayor of Adelaide from 2014 to 2018.

In 1981, Mitchell, Whyte, and his sister Jean Whyte bought some land at Carrickalinga and erected a kit house as a retreat.

== Honours and legacy ==
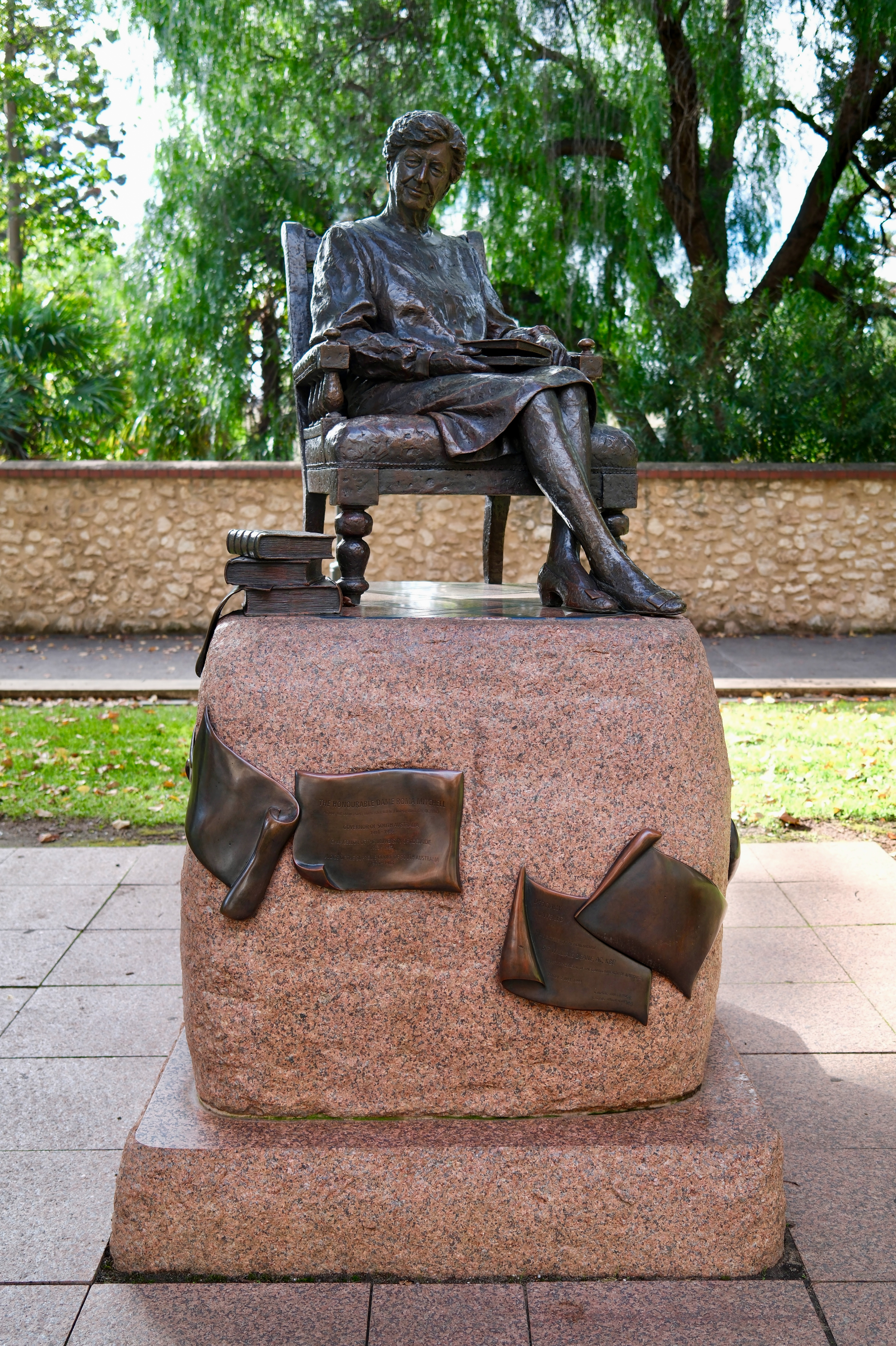
Statue of Mitchell on North Terrace, Adelaide, 2026

Mitchell was appointed a Commander of the Order of the British Empire (CBE) in the 1971 Birthday Honours on 12 June for service to law and was elevated to Dame Commander of the Order of the British Empire (DBE) in the 1982 Birthday Honours for service to the community. She received a Doctor of the University degree in 1985 for her service to the University of Adelaide and was appointed a Companion of the Order of Australia (AC) during the 1991 Australia Day Honours for her contributions to law, learning, and the community. Mitchell was awarded the Key to the City by the City of Adelaide in 1996 and the Legion of Honour by the French government on 10 April 1997. A statue by Janette Moore, unveiled by William Deane in June 1999 in Prince Henry Gardens outside Government House, depicts Mitchell seated informally and reading, an image Deane said evoked her presence in the nearby gardens, with an inscription recording her career.

Mitchell was made a Commander of the Royal Victorian Order (CVO) in the 2000 New Year Honours on 1 January; as her health deteriorated, Deane personally bestowed the honour at her bedside. Following her death, she left a bequest to the University of Adelaide, which established the Dame Roma Mitchell Chair of Law, and she was also a founding member of the university's Graduates Union. The Roma Mitchell Chambers, opened on 7 December 2000, were named in her honour, with Gerard Brennan highlighting her achievements, independence, and lifelong public and private service, and she was posthumously inducted on to the Victorian Honour Roll of Women in 2001. Roma Mitchell Secondary College, created in 2006 from the merger of four schools at Gepps Cross, was named in consultation with the community to honour her legacy. The A$96 million Roma Mitchell Commonwealth Law Court Building, designed by Mariano Deuonni of Hassell and opened in February 2006, houses the Federal, Family, and Federal Magistrates courts and accommodates the High Court when visiting the state. Additionally, the ACV Dame Roma Mitchell, a Bay-class patrol boat, was commissioned in December 2000 and completed its final patrol before decommissioning in December 2014.

== See also ==
- First women lawyers around the world
- List of the first women appointed to Australian judicial positions
- List of the first women holders of political offices in Oceania

== Notes ==
Legal offices
New office	Chair of the Australian Human Rights Commission; 1981–1986	Succeeded by Marcus Einfeld
Academic offices
Preceded by John Bray	10th Chancellor of the University of Adelaide; 1983–1990	Succeeded by William Scammell
Government offices
Preceded by Donald Dunstan	31st Governor of South Australia; 1991–1996	Succeeded by Eric Neal
