= Crown Solicitor of South Australia =

- Incumbent; Lucinda Byers since January 2025
- Attorney-General's Department
- Inaugural holder: Charles Mann
- Formation: 1837
- Website: Attorney-General's Department (South Australia)

The Crown Solicitor of South Australia provides legal services to South Australian government Ministers, agencies and departments.

In the early days of the colony the titles of Advocate-General, Crown Solicitor and Public Prosecutor were bestowed together. That changed in 1850 due to the ill-health of then Advocate-General, William Smillie. As a consequence of Smillie's ill-health, the position of Crown Solicitor was given to Charles Mann. Mann briefly held the title of Acting Advocate-General before resigning that position in favour of Richard Hanson. Hanson became South Australia's last Advocate-General and the provinces first Attorney-General in the inaugural Parliament in 1857.

Since 1850, the position of Crown Solicitor has been a public sector employee. The current Crown Solicitor of South Australia, as of January 2025, is Lucinda Byers.

== List of Crown Solicitors of South Australia (1851 to 2025) ==
Crown Solicitor	Time in office
Charles Mann	1837–38
George Milner Stephen	1838
Robert Bernard	1838–40
William Smillie	1840–52
William Bartley (Acting)	1849–50
Charles Mann	1850–56
William Alfred Wearing QC	1856–67
William Bakewell	1867–70
Richard Bullock Andrews QC	1870–81
Charles Mann QC	1881–89
James Martin Stuart	1889–1905
Charles James Dashwood KC	1905–16
Frederick William Richards KC	1916–27
Albert James Hannan	1927–52
Reginald Roderick St Clair Chamberlain KC	1952–59
Joseph Reginald Kearnan QC	1959–68
William Andrew Noye Wells QC	1968–69
Ralph Meyrick Hague	1969–70
Leslie Kenneth Gordon	1970–76
Graham Clifton Prior QC	1976–84
Catherine Margaret Branson QC	1984–89
Bradley Maxwell Selway QC	1989–96
Michael Walter QC	1996–2004
Simon Stretton SC	2004–10
Gregory Parker	2010–13
Michael Evans QC	2015–16
Judith Hughes	2016–17
Michael Wait SC	2018–20
Laura Stein	2020–21
Ingrid Norman	2021–2024
Lucinda Byers	2025–
