= Martin Hinton (judge) =

Australian judge

The Honourable Martin Hinton KC

Director of Public Prosecutions for South Australia
- Incumbent
- Assumed office 18 September 2019
- Preceded by: Adam Kimber SC

Judge of the Supreme Court of South Australia
- In office 28 April 2016 – 2019

Solicitor-General of South Australia
- In office 21 August 2008 – 2016
- Preceded by: Chris Kourakis SC
- Succeeded by: Chris Bleby SC

Personal details
- Born: Martin Gerard Hinton
- Citizenship: Australian
- Education: University of Adelaide

Martin Gerard Hinton KC is the Director of Public Prosecutions for South Australia, and a former justice of the Supreme Court of South Australia and Solicitor-General of South Australia. Hinton was admitted to legal practice in December 1989 after completing his studies at the University of South Australia. He worked in the United Kingdom for the Crown Prosecution Service. On his return to Adelaide he worked as a prosecutor for the Director of Public Prosecutions and was appointed Queen's Counsel in 2006. He was appointed Solicitor-General in 2008 and held that office until 2016 when he was appointed to the Supreme Court of South Australia. He resigned as a Judge in late 2019 to take up an appointment as the Director of Public Prosecutions. Hinton is also an adjunct professor at the University of Adelaide and at the University of South Australia, teaching Constitutional Law.

Legal offices
Preceded by Chris Kourakis SC	Solicitor-General of South Australia; 2008–2016	Succeeded by Chris Bleby SC
