= Sam Jacobs (judge) =

Australian judge

Captain The Honourable Dr Justice Sam Jacobs AO QC

Deputy Chancellor of the University of Adelaide
- In office April 1984 – 1993 Serving with Senior Deputy Chancellor; Harry Medlin
- Chancellor: Dame Roma Mitchell; Bill Scammell
- Preceded by: Harry Medlin
- Succeeded by: Mervyn Smith

Judge of the Supreme Court of South Australia
- In office 1973–1990

Personal details
- Born: Samuel Joshua Jacobs; 6 December 1920 Glenelg, South Australia
- Died: 11 October 2011 (aged 90)

CAPT The Hon. Dr Justice Samuel Joshua Jacobs AO QC (1920–2011) was an Australian lawyer and judge. After being compulsorily retired at age 70 in 1990, he was recalled and appointed as Royal Commissioner into the inquiry into the State Bank of South Australia debt crisis.

== Early life ==
Jacobs was born 6 December 1920 in the Adelaide suburb of Glenelg, the son of Roland Jacobs. He was educated at Scotch College, Adelaide (1929–1938) and the University of Adelaide where he obtained his law degree in 1948 – his studies were interrupted by World War II. He entered private practice after graduation.

== Career and achievements ==
He became a member of the Council of Law Society in 1957, a Queens Council in 1965 and was President of the Law Society of SA from 1970 to 1972. He was appointed as a Justice of the Supreme Court of SA in 1973.

He served in a wide range of organisations, including:

- member of the Council of Governors of Scotch College from 1966
- member of the State Law Reform committee
- member of the Board of Management of the Kindergarten Union of SA
- associated with the work of the crippled Children’s Association
- from 1966 to 1973 was a Director of the SA Gas Co.
- member of the Winston Churchill Memorial Trust
- Hon. Colonel of the Adelaide University Regiment from 1979
- member of the University of Adelaide Council for 15 years
- Deputy Chancellor of the University of Adelaide (1984–1993)

Jacobs was named an Officer of the Order of Australia in the 1982 Queen's Birthday Honours List. He received the Centenary Medal in 2001. He was awarded honorary doctorates by the Universities of Adelaide and South Australia.

== Death ==
He died 11 October 2011, survived by four children.
