= Charles Cooper (judge) =

Australian politician

The Honourable Sir Charles Cooper KC
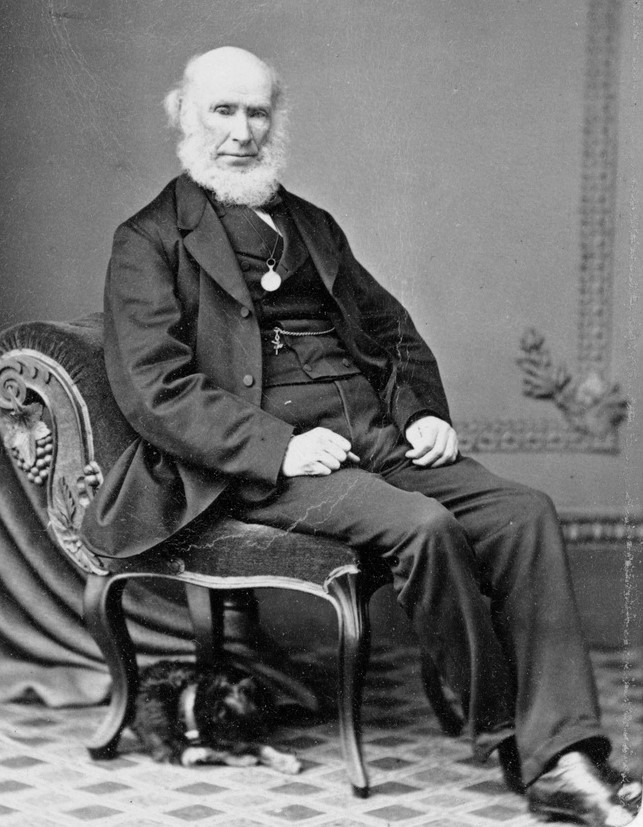

Chief Justice of South Australia (Note: Cooper was the sole judge on the Supreme Court from 1838 to 1850. He was officially appointed Chief Justice on 1 July 1856.)
- In office 1 July 1856 – 20 November 1861
- Preceded by: office established
- Succeeded by: Sir Richard Hanson

Judge of the Supreme Court of South Australia
- In office July 1838 – 20 November 1861

Personal details
- Born: Charles Cooper; 1795 Henley-on-Thames, England
- Died: 24 May 1887 (aged 91–92) London, England
- Spouse: Emily Newenham

Sir Charles Cooper (1795 – 24 May 1887) was the first Chief Justice of South Australia and for two years a politician in the colony of South Australia.

== Early life and education ==
Charles Cooper was born in 1795 Henley-on-Thames, the third son of Thomas Cooper, under-sheriff of Oxfordshire.

He entered the Inner Temple in 1822 and was called to the bar in February 1827.

== Career ==
He and his sister Sarah Ann Cooper traveled to the colony of South Australia onboard the Katherine Stewart Forbes, arriving in Adelaide in March 1839.

In September 1860 was sworn in as a member of the Executive Council of South Australia, which was part of the government in the now self-governing colony.

== Honours and legacy ==
While in South Australia he had a seaside residence adjacent to "The Grange", Charles Sturt's property for which Grange Beach was named. It is likely that Henley Beach was named for Cooper's hometown, after Cooper rejected Sturt's proposed name "Cooper's Beach".

His city home, at south-east corner of Whitmore Square, was in May 1870 re-opened as the Bushmen's Club, a facility for members visiting the city.

== Personal life ==
Cooper married in 1853 Emily Grace Newenham, eldest daughter of Charles Burton Newenham, Sheriff of the Province. They had no children, and she outlived him.

His sister Sarah Ann Cooper (c. 1804 – 31 May 1895) married William Bartley (1801–1885), Senior Solicitor to the Lands Titles Office, on 23 September 1852.

Legal offices
| New title | Chief Justice of South Australia; 1 July 1856 – 20 November 1861 | Succeeded by Richard Hanson |
