= Adam Kimber =

Australian judge and cricketer

Adam Kimber SC

Director of Public Prosecutions (SA)
- In office 2012–2019
- Premier: Jay Weatherill
- Governor: Rear Admiral Kevin Scarce; Hieu Van Le
- Preceded by: Stephen Pallaras QC
- Succeeded by: Martin Hinton QC

Personal details
- Born: Adam Patrick Kimber; 30 September 1969 (age 57) North Adelaide, South Australia, Australia
- Parent(s): Richard Kimber; Carlien Kimber
- Education: Saint Ignatius' College, Adelaide
- Alma mater: University of Adelaide
- Occupation: Director of Public Prosecutions
- Cricket career

Cricket information
- Batting: Right-handed
- Role: Batsman

Domestic team information
- Years: Team
- 1987-2003: Adelaide University Cricket Club
- 1996/97: South Australia

Career statistics
Competition	FC
Matches	2
Runs scored	54
Batting average	13.50
100s/50s	0/0
Top score	27
Balls bowled	–
Wickets	–
Bowling average	–
5 wickets in innings	–
10 wickets in match	–
Best bowling	–
Catches/stumpings	3/0
- Source: Cricinfo, 13 December 2016

Adam Patrick Kimber SC (1969) is a judge of the South Australian Supreme Court, formerly a prominent South Australian criminal barrister and judge of the District Court. He was the Director of Public Prosecutions of South Australia between 2012 and 2019.

== Education & Career ==
Kimber was educated at Saint Ignatius' College, Adelaide where he completed matriculation in 1986 with a score "in the high 400s". The next year he commenced an Arts/Law degree at the University of Adelaide, graduating from the Law School in 1993 with a LLB (Hons).

Following graduation, he spent 15 months working as an associate to Chief Justice Len King until April, 1995. Whilst working at Wallmans solicitors, he was approached by Paul Rofe to join the Office of the Director of Public Prosecutions. Rofe said he had poached Kimber because he had recognised his potential while he was Chief Justice King's associate.

Kimber was appointed a justice of the Supreme Court on 2 June, 2022.

== Personal life ==
Kimber was an excellent grade cricketer, captaining the Adelaide University Cricket Club. During the 16 years he played for the club, he won three A grade premierships. During this time he also played two matches for South Australia where he was the 538th person to represent the state.

Adam still enjoys a close relationship with the Adelaide University Cricket Club as its president.

Legal offices
Preceded by Stephen Pallaras	Director of Public Prosecutions (SA); 2012 - 2019	Incumbent
