= Charles Mann (advocate-general) =

Australian politician

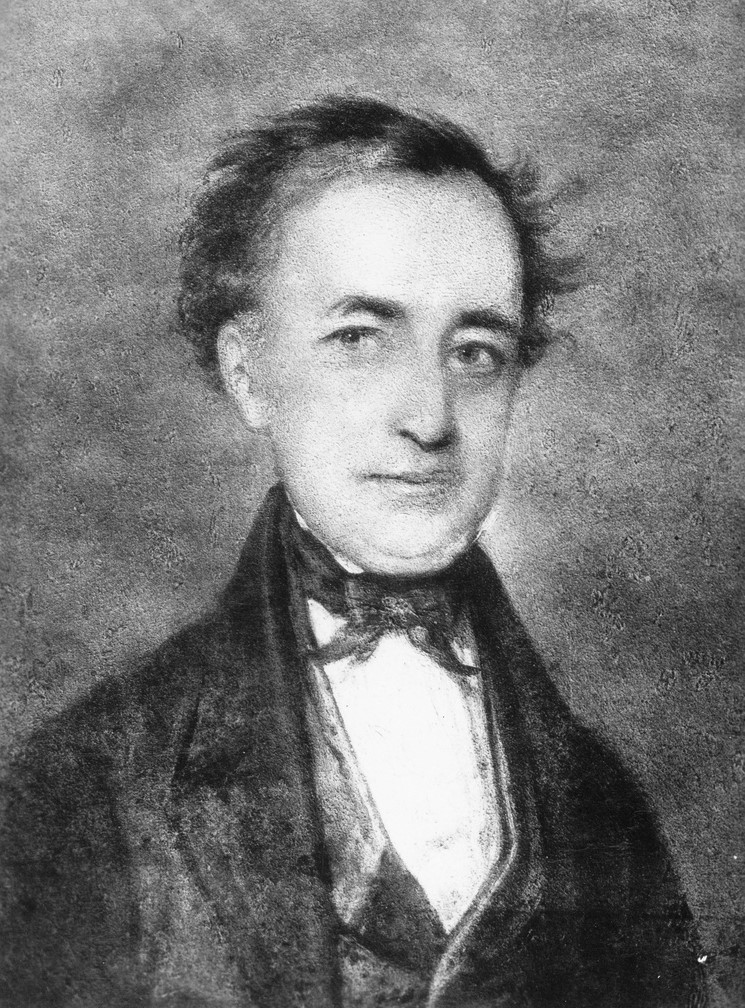
- Born: 8 July 1799; Syleham, East Suffolk, England
- Died: 24 May 1860 (aged 60); Adelaide, South Australia
- Occupation: Solicitor
- Known for: First Advocate-General of South Australia

Charles Mann (8 July 1799 – 24 May 1860) was the first South Australian Advocate-General.

== Biography ==
Mann was born in Syleham, East Suffolk, England, son of Charles Mann and his wife Sarah, née Moxon. Mann was admitted a solicitor in the King's Bench Division and set up practice in Cannon Street, London.

At Captain (Sir) John Hindmarsh's request, Mann was appointed the first South Australian Advocate–General and Crown Solicitor, this included a position on the South Australian Legislative Council. Mann sailed in the Coromandel, arriving at Holdfast Bay on 12 January 1837. He resigned his office on 17 November 1837 due to a dispute with Governor Hindmarsh.

Mann was a partner with Edward Castres Gwynne for a time, and became master of the Supreme Court of South Australia in 1844, and acting judge in 1849. Mann was appointed crown solicitor in 1850, police magistrate and insolvency commissioner in 1856, and commissioner of the Court of Insolvency and stipendiary magistrate in 1858.

He died at his home in Gilbert Street, Adelaide, on 24 May 1860.
