= 5EBI =

Ethnic radio station in Adelaide, South Australia

Australia
- Broadcast area: Adelaide, South Australia
- Frequency: 103.1 MHz

Programming
- Format: FM radio

History
- First air date: 3 March 1975
- Former call signs: 5UV

Technical information
- Transmitter coordinates: 34.9817°S 138.7067°E

Links
- Website: www.5ebi.com.au

5EBI is a multi-ethnic community broadcaster located in Adelaide. Originally launched as non-English programmes on 5UV, Adelaide Ethnic Broadcasters Incorporated was given their own frequency in 1979, on 103.1 FM.
