= Len King =

Australian politician (1925–2011)

The Honourable Len King AC QC

Chief Justice of South Australia
- In office 30 October 1978 – 28 April 1995
- Preceded by: John Bray
- Succeeded by: John Doyle

Judge of the Supreme Court of South Australia
- In office 20 June 1975 – 30 October 1978

Attorney-General of South Australia
- In office 2 June 1970 – 20 June 1975
- Preceded by: Robin Millhouse
- Succeeded by: Don Dunstan

Member of the South Australian Parliament for Coles
- In office 30 May 1970 – 12 July 1975
- Preceded by: None
- Succeeded by: Des Corcoran

Personal details
- Born: Leonard James King; 1 May 1925 Norwood, South Australia
- Died: 23 June 2011 (aged 86)
- Parent(s): Michael King; Mary King (nee Ryan)
- Education: University of Adelaide
- Occupation: Lawyer; Politician; Judge
- Awards: Companion of the Order of Australia (AC)

Leonard James King AC QC (1 May 1925 – 23 June 2011) was an Australian politician, lawyer and judge.

== Early life ==
King matriculated from St Joseph's Memorial School at age 14, then worked at Shell Company as a clerk. He served in the Royal Australian Air Force in Australia and New Guinea during World War II, and used the Commonwealth Reconstruction Training Scheme to commence study for his law degree.

== Legal career ==
King was admitted to practice as a barrister and solicitor in December 1950, and appointed Queen's Counsel in 1967.

== Political career ==
King was a Labor Party member of the South Australian House of Assembly from 1970 to 1975, representing the eastern suburbs electoral district of Coles. He was appointed to various ministerial portfolios during his career, including Aboriginal Affairs, Social Welfare, Community Welfare, and Prices & Consumer Affairs. In late 20th century South Australian history, he is one of the few newly elected members of Parliament that have been appointed straight to a Cabinet position without any previous parliamentary experience. He was the 40th Attorney-General of South Australia during the reformist Don Dunstan government, from 1970 until 1975.

== Judicial career ==
King was a puisne justice of the Supreme Court of South Australia from 20 June 1975 until his promotion to Chief Justice on 30 October 1978. He retired on 28 April 1995. King worked until his death as a part-time mediator and sometimes as an Acting Justice of the Supreme Court of South Australia.

== Recognition ==
King was appointed a Companion of the Order of Australia (AC) in the 1987 Queen's Birthday Honours "For service to the South Australian Parliament, Government and to the law."

== Legacy ==
The South Australian Electoral district of King was created before the 2018 state election and named after Len King. It covers the northern foothills of the Mount Lofty Ranges including Bibaringa, Yattalunga, Uleybury, One Tree Hill, Gould Creek, Hillbank, Salisbury Park, Salisbury Heights, Greenwith, Golden Grove and part of Salisbury East

== See also ==
- Judiciary of Australia

Parliament of South Australia
| Preceded by New electorate | Member for Coles; 1970–1975 | Succeeded by Des Corcoran |
Political offices
| Preceded by Robin Millhouse | Attorney-General of South Australia; 1970–1975 | Succeeded by Don Dunstan |
Legal offices
| Preceded by John Bray | Chief Justice of South Australia; 30 October 1978 – 28 April 1995 | Succeeded by John Doyle |
