= Bradley Selway =

Australian judge

Bradley Maxwell Selway QC (9 January 1955 – 10 April 2005) was a Judge of the Federal Court of Australia from 2002 until his death.

== Early life and education ==
Selway was born on 9 January 1955 in Gawler, South Australia. His secondary education, for which he had a full scholarship, was undertaken at Westminster School, Adelaide. He went on to study law at the University of Adelaide from 1973 to 1976.

== Career ==
After graduating from law school, he worked for many years in the South Australian Crown Law Office. From the 1980s, he was appointed to a series of senior posts: Crown Solicitor (1989), Queen's Counsel (1994) and Solicitor-General (1995-2002).

In 2002, Selway was appointed as a Federal Court Judge, as well as Adjunct Professor of the University of Adelaide Law School. He died on 10 April 2005, aged 50.

== Published works ==
- Public Law and the South Australian Crown (1990)
- The Constitution of South Australia (1997)

Legal offices
Preceded by John Doyle QC	Solicitor-General of South Australia; 1995 – 2002	Succeeded by Chris Kourakis QC
