= Solicitor-General of South Australia =

Law officer of South Australia

Solicitor-General of South Australia of Attorney General's Department
- Coat of arms of South Australia
- Incumbent; Mike Wait SC since 3 August 2020
- Appointer: Governor of South Australia
- Formation: 1972

The Solicitor-General of South Australia is the second law officer of South Australia. Their duties primarily include receiving instructions from the Attorney General and appearing in court for the state, Crown Solicitor and Director of Public Prosecutions.
