= Attorney-General of South Australia =

South Australian cabinet minister

- South Australian Coat of Arms

- Flag of South Australia

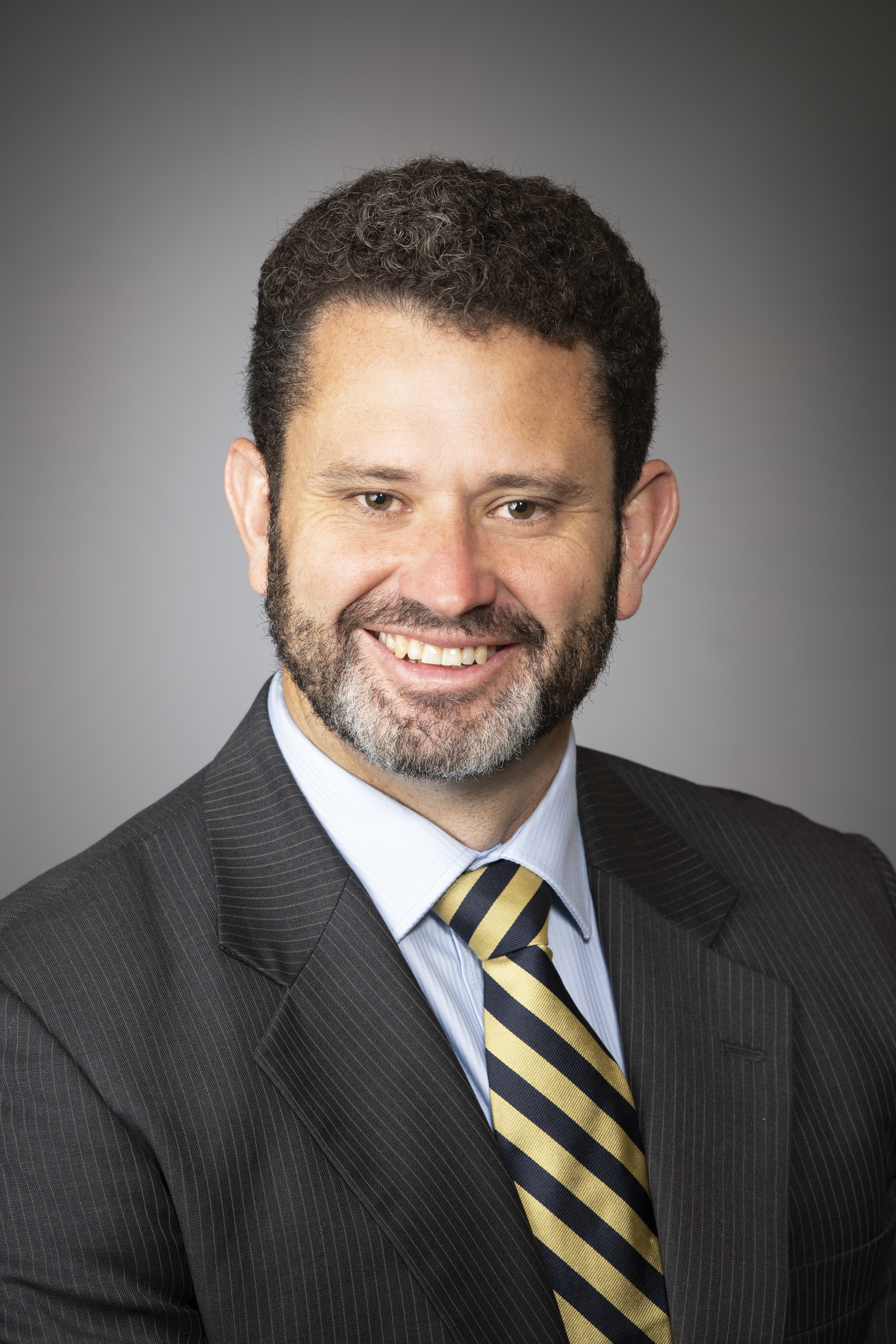
- Incumbent; Kyam Maher since 24 March 2022
- Attorney-General's Department
- Style: The Honourable
- Member of: Parliament; Cabinet; Executive Council
- Reports to: Premier of South Australia
- Seat: 45 Pirie Street, Adelaide
- Nominator: Premier of South Australia
- Appointer: Governor of South Australia; on the advice of the premier
- Term length: At the governor's pleasure
- Formation: 24 October 1856
- First holder: Richard Hanson
- Website: www.agd.sa.gov.au

The Attorney-General of South Australia is the Cabinet minister in the Government of South Australia who is responsible for that state's system of law and justice. The attorney-general must be a qualified legal practitioner, although this was not always the case.

The attorney-general oversees the Attorney-General's Department. The current attorney-general since March 2022 is Kyam Maher MP, a member of the South Australian Labor Party.

== List of advocates-general of South Australia (1837 to 1851) ==
With the establishment of the province of South Australia, the colony's first First Law Officer Charles Mann was appointed Advocate-General, Crown Solicitor and Public Prosecutor. The appointment as Advocate-General bestowed the office holder with membership of the Council in Government. With the arrival of self government in 1857, the position of Advocate-General became that of Attorney-General.

Advocate-General	Time in office
Charles Mann	1837–38
George Milner Stephen	1838
Robert Bernard	1838–40
William Smillie	1840–52
William Bartley (Acting)	1849–50
Charles Mann (Acting)	1850–51
Richard Davies Hanson	1851–57

== List of attorneys-general of South Australia ==
Ordinal	Attorney-General	Party	Term start	Term end	Time in office
1	Richard Hanson		24 October 1856	21 August 1857	
2	Edward Castres Gwynne		21 August 1857	1 September 1857	
3	Richard Bullock Andrews		1 September 1857	30 September 1857	
–	Richard Hanson		30 September 1857	9 May 1860	
4	Henry Strangways		9 May 1860	20 May 1861	
5	Randolph Isham Stow		20 May 1861	8 October 1861	
6	Henry Gawler		8 October 1861	17 October 1861	
–	Randolph Isham Stow		17 October 1861	4 July 1863	
–	Richard Bullock Andrews		4 July 1863	22 July 1864	
–	Randolph Isham Stow		22 July 1864	22 March 1865	
–	Richard Bullock Andrews		22 March 1865	23 October 1865	
7	James Boucaut		23 October 1865	3 May 1867	
–	Richard Bullock Andrews		3 May 1867	24 September 1868	
8	John Tuthill Bagot		24 September 1868	13 October 1868	
–	Richard Bullock Andrews		13 October 1868	3 Nov 1868	
–	Henry Strangways		3 Nov 1868	30 May 1870	
9	Richard Baker		30 May 1870	21 July 1871	
10	Charles Mann		21 July 1871	22 January 1872	
–	James Boucaut		22 January 1872	4 March 1872	
11	George Stevenson		4 March 1872	22 July 1873	
–	Charles Mann		22 July 1873	3 June 1875	
12	Samuel Way		3 June 1875	23 March 1876	
–	Henry Gawler		23 March 1876	25 March 1876	
–	Charles Mann		25 March 1876	6 June 1876	
13	John Cox Bray		6 June 1876	26 October 1877	
–	Charles Mann		26 October 1877	27 September 1878	
14	William Bundey		27 September 1878	10 March 1881	
15	Josiah Symon		10 March 1881	24 June 1881	
16	John Downer		24 June 1881	16 June 1884	
17	Charles Kingston		16 June 1884	16 June 1885	
–	John Downer		16 June 1885	11 June 1887	
–	Charles Kingston		11 June 1887	27 June 1889	
18	Beaumont Moulden		27 June 1889	19 March 1890	
19	Frederick Turner		31 March 1890	2 May 1890	
20	Henry Downer		2 May 1890	19 August 1890	
21	Robert Homburg		19 August 1890	21 June 1892	
22	William Stock		21 June 1892	15 October 1892	
–	Robert Homburg		15 October 1892	16 June 1893	
–	Charles Kingston		16 June 1893	1 December 1899	
23	Paddy Glynn		1 December 1899	8 December 1899	
24	John Hannah Gordon		8 December 1899	2 December 1903	
25	Louis von Doussa		2 December 1903	4 July 1904	
–	Robert Homburg		4 July 1904	24 February 1905	
26	James R. Anderson		1 March 1905	26 July 1905	
27	Archibald Peake	Liberal and Democratic Union (LDU)	26 July 1905	5 June 1909	
28	Samuel Mitchell	LDU	5 June 1909	22 December 1909	
29	Hermann Homburg	LDU	22 December 1909	3 June 1910	
30	Bill Denny	United Labor	3 June 1910	17 February 1912	
–	Hermann Homburg	Liberal Union	17 February 1912	21 January 1915	
31	Herbert Angas Parsons	Liberal Union	21 January 1915	3 April 1915	
32	John Vaughan	United Labor/Nationals	3 April 1915	14 July 1917	
33	Henry Barwell	Liberal Union	14 July 1917	27 August 1917	
–	Archibald Peake	Liberal Union	27 August 1917	29 April 1918	
–	Henry Barwell	Liberal Union	29 April 1918	16 April 1924	
–	Bill Denny	Labor	16 April 1924	8 April 1927	
–	Hermann Homburg	Liberal Federation	8 April 1927	17 April 1930	
–	Bill Denny	Labor	17 April 1930	18 April 1933	
34	Shirley Jeffries	Liberal and Country League (LCL)	18 April 1933	6 May 1944	11 years, 18 days
35	Charles Abbott	LCL	15 May 1944	17 April 1946	
36	Reginald Rudall	LCL	17 April 1946	1 January 1955	
37	Thomas Playford IV	LCL	6 January 1955	6 April 1955	
38	Colin Rowe	LCL	6 April 1955	10 March 1965	
39	Don Dunstan	Labor	10 March 1965	16 April 1968	
40	Robin Millhouse	LCL	17 April 1968	1 June 1970	
41	Len King	Labor	2 June 1970	20 June 1975	
–	Don Dunstan	Labor	20 June 1975	9 October 1975	111 days
42	Peter Duncan	Labor	9 October 1975	15 March 1979	
43	Don Banfield	Labor	15 March 1979	1 May 1979	
44	Chris Sumner	Labor	1 May 1979	18 September 1979	
45	Trevor Griffin	Liberal	18 September 1979	10 November 1982	
–	Chris Sumner	Labor	10 November 1982	14 December 1993	
–	Trevor Griffin	Liberal	14 December 1993	4 December 2001	
46	Robert Lawson	Liberal	4 December 2001	5 March 2002	
47	Michael Atkinson	Labor	5 March 2002	30 June 2003	
48	Paul Holloway	Labor	30 June 2003	29 August 2003	
–	Michael Atkinson	Labor	29 August 2003	25 March 2010	
49	John Rau	Labor	25 March 2010	19 March 2018	
50	Vickie Chapman [1st female]	Liberal	19 March 2018	21 March 2022	4 years, 2 days
51	Kyam Maher	Labor	24 March 2022	incumbent	4 years, 230 days

== See also ==
- Justice ministry
- Government of South Australia
