= Supreme Court of South Australia =

South Australia's superior court

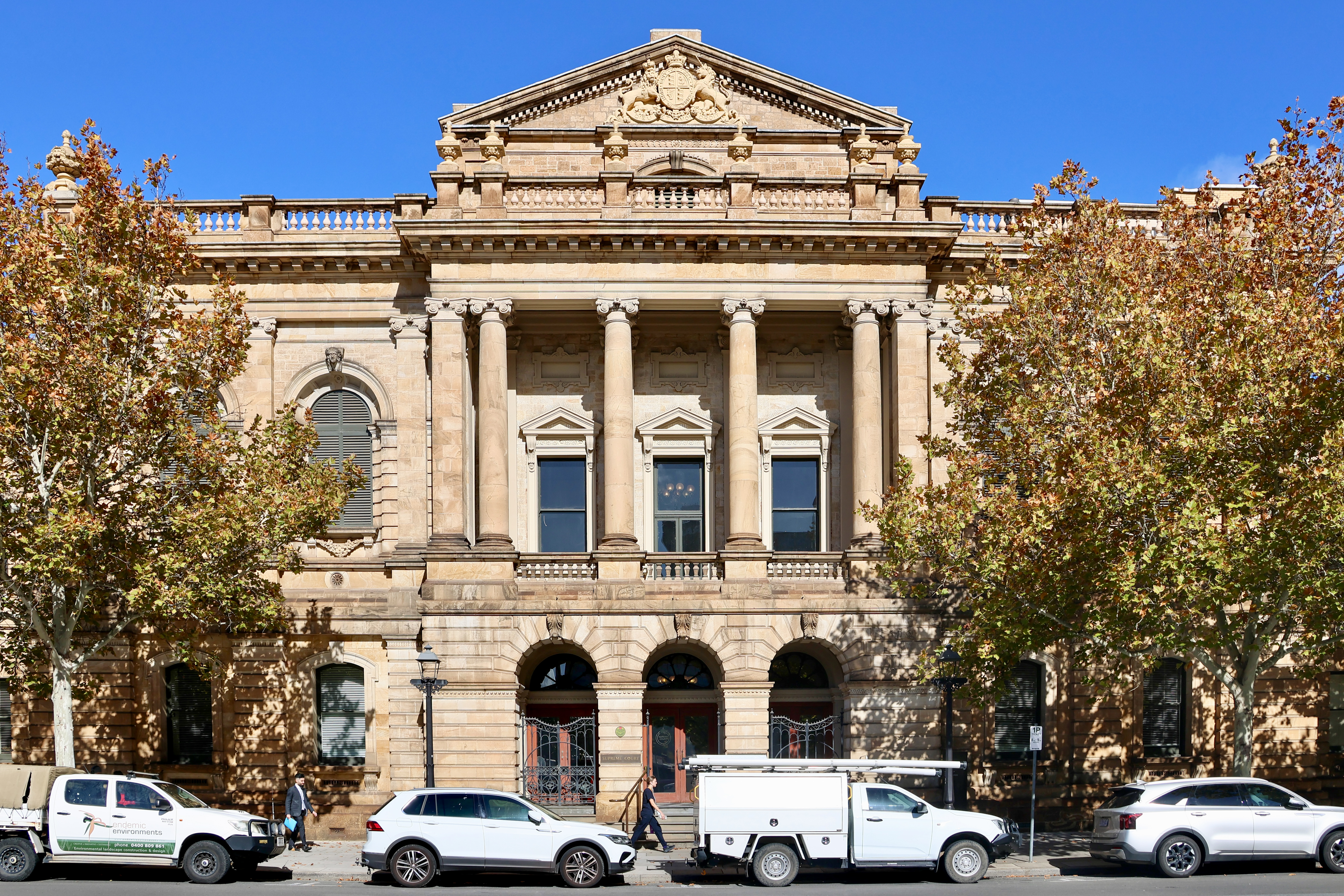
- The building in 2026

- The Royal Arms used on the seal of court
- Interactive map of Supreme Court of South Australia
- 34.930656°S 138.599762°E
- Established: 2 January 1837
- Jurisdiction: South Australia
- Location: Adelaide
- Coordinates: 34.930656°S 138.599762°E
- Composition method: Vice-regal appointment upon nomination by the Premier following the advice of the Attorney General and Executive Council of South Australia
- Authorised by: Parliament of South Australia via the: Constitution Act 1934 (SA); Supreme Court Act 1935 (SA)
- Appeals to: High Court of Australia
- Appeals from: District Court of South Australia
- Judge term length: Mandatory retirement by age of 70
- Number of positions: 13
- Website: Supreme Court of South Australia

Chief Justice of South Australia
- Currently: Laura Stein
- Since: 19 February 2026

The Supreme Court of South Australia is the superior court of the Australian state of South Australia. The Supreme Court is the highest South Australian court in the Australian court hierarchy. It has unlimited jurisdiction within the state in civil matters, and hears the most serious criminal matters. The Court is composed of a Chief Justice and as many other justices as may be required.

== History ==
The court was established by letters patent on 2 January 1837, five days after the colony was founded. The court is unique among Australia's state supreme courts in that it was established at the foundation of the colony of South Australia, as the notion of a supreme court was a part of the colony's founder, Edward Wakefield's theory of colonisation. Other Australian colonies only established their courts long after the settlement of the colony.

The court was endowed with all the common law and probate jurisdiction of the courts of Westminster. The first sessions of the court were not held until May 1837, presided over by Sir John Jeffcott, the first judge of the court. (The title of Chief Justice was not officially introduced until the coming into force of Act No 31 of 1855-1856.)

After Sir John's death in December 1837, Henry Jickling was appointed as an acting judge. Although appointed as a caretaker judge, Jickling was responsible for two important developments: he codified the testamentary causes jurisdiction of the court and admitted the first practitioners of the Supreme Court in March 1838.

Justice Jeffcott's permanent replacement on the court was Sir Charles Cooper. Reports of ill health prompted Governor Henry Young to ask for the appointment of a second judge. As a result Justice Crawford was appointed. Justice Crawford was the first justice to wear a wig in court. Crawford died after only two years on the bench.

Crawford was replaced by Justice Boothby. Boothby was a controversial judge who did not believe in the power of the colonial parliaments to enact laws. He arguably started the first constitutional crisis in Australian history when he ruled that the South Australian Constitution of 1856 was invalid, causing the Imperial Parliament to pass the Colonial Laws Validity Act 1865. Boothby was removed as a justice of the Supreme Court in July 1867. He appealed to the Privy Council in England but died before his appeal could be heard.

During Boothby's time on the court, the first Queen's Counsels were appointed and the first circuit sittings of the court took place in country South Australia.

In 1935 the Supreme Court Act 1935 commenced.

== Jurisdiction ==
The Court exercises both original and appellate jurisdiction in civil and criminal matters. The Court is a court of both law and equity. Though it has unlimited jurisdiction in civil matters, generally civil trials heard in the Court are those involving complex legal or factual issues or large sums of money. The Court also has exclusive jurisdiction in probate (wills & estates), meaning it is the only South Australian court that can hear such matters. In criminal matters, generally only the most serious crimes are tried in the Court (for example murder, treason, attempted murder and manslaughter) although the Court occasionally hears trials for less serious offences. Trials for murder and treason cannot be heard in any other court in South Australia. When exercising its original jurisdiction, the Court is usually composed of a single judge.

The Supreme Court hears appeals from the Magistrates Court of South Australia in both civil and criminal matters, and also from decisions of Supreme Court Masters and various other tribunals. In such cases, the Court ordinarily consists of a single judge. Particular judges may be designated to sit in the probate jurisdiction or assigned case management functions in respect of long and complex trials.

The proceedings of the Supreme Court of South Australia are normally heard in Adelaide. In civil cases the Court normally sits in the old Supreme Court building, while criminal matters are generally heard in the Sir Samuel Way Building. (The two buildings are located across the road from each other, on the corner of Gouger Street and Victoria Square.) The Court is empowered to sit in any place, including outside the State. The Court, consisting of a single judge, in exceptional circumstances can travel on circuit to the rural centres of Mount Gambier and Port Augusta.

Subject to statutory exceptions, an appeal is available by special leave to the High Court of Australia from all decisions of the Supreme Court of South Australia by virtue of s 73 of the Australian Constitution. Ordinarily, appeals are taken to the High Court only from decisions of the Full Court or Court of Criminal Appeal.

== See also ==
- List of judges of the Supreme Court of South Australia
- Judiciary of Australia
