= 1988 Australia Day Honours =

The 1988 Australia Day Honours are appointments to various orders and honours to recognise and reward good works by Australian citizens. The list was announced on 26 January 1988 by the Governor General of Australia, Sir Ninian Stephen.

The Australia Day Honours are the first of the two major annual honours lists, the first announced to coincide with Australia Day (26 January), with the other being the Queen's Birthday Honours, which are announced on the second Monday in June.

† indicates an award given posthumously.

== Order of Australia ==
=== Companion (AC) ===
==== General Division ====
Recipient	Citation	Notes
The Honourable Sir Nigel Hubert Bowen, KBE	For service to the law.	
The Honourable Sir Francis Gerard Brennan, KBE	For service to the law.	
Major-General Paul Alfred Cullen, AO CBE DSO	For service to the community, particularly to the welfare of the blind and visually impaired.	
David John David	For service to medicine, particularly in the field of craniofacial surgery, and to international relations.	
The Honourable Sir Daryl Michael Dawson, KBE CB	For service to the law.	
The Honourable Sir William Patrick Deane, KBE	For service to the law.	
The Right Honourable Sir William Frederick Payne Heseltine, KCB KCVO	For service to the Crown as a Private Secretary to The Queen of Australia.	
The Honourable Sir Anthony Frank Mason, KBE	For service to the law.	
Sir Eric James Neal	For service to commerce and to the community.	
Professor David Geoffrey Penington	For service to medicine and to the community, particularly in the fields of medical education and health care.	
The Honourable Justice John Leslie Toohey, AO	For service to the law.	
The Honourable Sir Ronald Darling Wilson, KBE	For service to the law.	
The Honourable Neville Kenneth Wran, QC	For service to government and politics and to the New South Wales Parliament.	

==== Military Division ====
Recipient	Citation	Notes
General Peter Courtney Gration, AO OBE	For service to the Australian Defence Force, particularly as Chief of the General Staff and as Chief of the Defence Force.	

=== Officers (AO) ===
==== General Division ====
Recipient	Citation	Notes
Commissioner John Keith Avery APM	For public service, particularly with the New South Wales Police Force.	
Professor Antony Basten	For service to medicine, particularly in the field of immunology.	
Marcus Besen	For service to commerce and the community.	
John Neil Bishop	For service to accountancy profession.	
Robert Britten-Jones	For service to medicine.	
Quentin Alice Louise Bryce	For service to the community, particularly to women and to children.	
Judy Cassab OBE	For service to the visual arts.	
Stanley Edgar Costigan	For service to secondary industry and to the community.	
Kenneth Edward Cowley	For service to the media and to the community.	
Philip Sutton Cox	For service to architecture.	
Stuart Leslie Devlin CMG	For service to craftsmanship as a goldsmith, silversmith and designer.	
Donald Herbert Eltringham	For public service.	
Professor Peter Thomas Fink CB CBE	For service to science and to engineering.	
The Honourable Justice William Kenneth Fisher	For service to industrial relations.	
Marjory Joyce Fitzpatrick	For service to education.	
Neale Andrew Fraser MBE	For service to tennis.	
The Honourable Harold Hyam Glass RFD QC	For service to the law and to the Royal Australian Navy.	
Professor Richard Spencer Butler Gye	For service to medicine.	
Harry Hauenschild	For service to the trade union movement.	
The Honourable Patrick Darcy Hills	For service to the New South Wales Parliament and to local government.	
The Right Reverend Peter John Hollingworth	For service to religion and to the community.	
Stuart Gordon Hornery	For service to secondary industry.	
The Honourable Thomas Eyre Forrest Hughes QC	For service to the legal profession.	
The Honourable Colin John Jamieson	For service to the Western Australian Parliament and to the community	
Brian Francis Johns	For service to publishing and to the media.	
Harold Gemmell Kippax	For service to the theatre and to the media.	
Robert Edward Klippel	For service to art, particularly sculpture.	
Professor Alex Lazenby	For service to learning.	
Eve Mahlab	For service to business, to government and to the community, particularly to women.	
Stanley William Otto Menzel OBE	For service to the construction industry and to the promotion of exports.	
His Excellency the Honorable William Lawrence Morrison	For service to the Commonwealth Parliament and to international relations.	
Doctor David Mossenson ISO	For service to education.	
Noel Bede Nairn	For service to education as an historian and biographer.	
Professor Robert John O'Neill	For service to international relations and to education.	
Kevin John Parry	For service to secondary industry, to sport and to the community.	
John Theodore Ralph	For service to the manufacturing industry and to the community.	
Emeritus Professor Rupert William Roye Rutland	For service to science, particularly in the field of geology.	
Doctor Mercy Sadka	For service to medicine, particularly in the field of neurology.	
Ralph Tony Sarich	For service to engineering.	
Emeritus Professor Peter Scott OBE	For service to learning and to the community.	
Doctor Mark Xavier Shanahan	For service to medicine, particularly in the field of cardio-thoracic surgery.	
Harold James Souter AM	For service to the trade union movement.	
Emeritus Professor Trevor Winchester Swan	For service to education and to government, particularly in the field of economics.	
Stewart Laurence Wallis	For service to the construction industry.	

==== Military Division ====
Branch	Recipient	Citation	Notes
Navy	Rear Admiral Barrie Lawson West RAN	For service to the Royal Australia Navy as Chief of Naval Materiel.	
Army	Major General Duncan McKenzie Francis OBE	For service to the Australian Army as Chief of Materiel.	
Army	Major General John Nelson Stein AM	For service to the Australian Army as Chief of Logistics.	
Air Force	Air Commodore Robert Alexander Kee	For service to the Royal Australian Air Force as Director General, Material Projects — Air Force.	

=== Member (AM) ===
==== General Division ====
Recipient	Citation	Notes
Albert Henry Royce Abbey DCM	For service to the community.	
Richard John Aggiss	For service to hockey.	
William Arthur Akers	For service to the performing arts as a production and lighting designer.	
Graham Ross Anderson	For service to primary industry, particularly the avocado industry.	
Herbert Maxwell Andrew	For service to primary industry, particularly the dairy industry.	
Kenneth Richard Arthurson	For service to rugby league football.	
Jack Ball	For service to lawn bowls and to the advertising industry.	
Geoffrey Robert Bardon	For service to the preservation and development of traditional Aboriginal art forms.	
Max Rafeek Basheer	For service to Australian football.	
Doctor Clifford Douglas Blake	For service to tertiary education and to the community.	
Maria Anna Elizabeth Blake	For service to the travel industry.	
Doctor Richard William Boden	For service to medicine.	
Donald Stirling Bray	For service to secondary education.	
Arthur Edward Breasley	For services to horse racing.	
His Honour Judge Donald Malcolm Brebner	For service to Australian football and to the community.	
John Edwards Bromell	For service to agriculture and to conservation.	
Leo Brown	For service to the trade union movement.	
Alderman Ian Brusasco	For service to soccer.	
Jane Margaret Harding Burns	For service to the promotion of Australian crafts.	
Richard William Butler	For service to international peace and disarmament.	
Donel Kevin Byrne	For service to people with disabilities.	
Thomas Ewan Cain	For service to tertiary education particularly in the field of legal studies.	
Kevin John Cashman	For service to the manufacturing industry.	
The Right Reverend Michael Boyd Challen	For service to religion.	
Emeritus Professor Edna Rose Chamberlain	For service to social work, education and the community.	
Maren Isobel Chandler	For service to the Girl Guides Association of Victoria and to the community.	
Geoffrey William Chard	For service to opera.	
Thelma Cecily Clune	For service to the visual arts.	
Bruce Joseph Collier	For service to medicine and to the community.	
Doctor Michael Connaughton	For service to medicine and to the community.	
Antony Edmund Rundle Coote	For service to commerce and to the community.	
Nigel Arthur Holloway Creese	For service to education.	
James Leo Crichton	For public service.	
William Edward Kenneth Dalzell	For service to primary industry, particularly grain growing and marketing.	
Wing Commander Francis William Davison RAF (Retd)	For service to people with intellectual disabilities.	
John Henry Day	For service to education and to the community.	
Sister Francis Dunne	For service to Aboriginal communities in the Kimberley Region, particularly in the management of leprosy.	
Ernest William Bower Eddy	For service to secondary industry, particularly in the field of engineering.	
Rex Ernest Ellis	For service to music, particularly as an organiser of concerts.	
Edward William Excell	For service to the development of Australian overseas trade.	
Evelyn Doreen Fesl	For service to the development of multiculturalism in Australia and to the preservation of Aboriginal culture and languages.	
Rabbi Brian Douglas Fox	For service to the Jewish community and to religion.	
John Colin Frearson	For service to primary industry and to banking.	
Irene Muriel Gale	For service to the community through the promotion of racial understanding.	
Geoffrey John Gateley	For service to secondary industry, particularly in the field of computer technology.	
Brian Francis Gibson	For service to the forestry industry.	
Robert Malcolm Goot	For service to the welfare of the Jewish community.	
Reverend Father Joseph Matthew Grealy ED	For service to religion and to the community as an industrial chaplain.	
Peter Christopher Bourne Grey	For service to Australian economic development and research.	
Ian Maurice Haig	For service to international relations.	
Edith Mary Hall	For service to the community, particularly to people with disabilities.	
Doctor Benedetto Haneman	For service to medicine and to the Spanish community.	
Doctor Geoffrey George Haward	For service to education, particularly teacher education.	
John Herbert Somerset Heussler	For service to primary industry.	
Lorna Joy Hewson	For service to stroke sufferers and to their families.	
Doctor Kevin Thomas Hobbs	For service to sports medicine.	
Doctor Raymond Moulton Hollings	For service to medical education, particularly in the field of surgery.	
Doctor Edward Gordon Hudson	For service to medicine, particularly in the field of anaesthesia.	
Ronald Dennis Ireland MBE ED	For service to secondary industry, to veterans and to Legacy.	
Alan Belford Jones	For service to rugby union football.	
Eileen Rosemary Jones	For service to Aboriginal communities in the Northern Territory, particularly in the management of leprosy.	
John Benjamin David Joslin	For public service as Controller of the Royal Australian Mint.	
Arthur Powell Kenyon	For service to the community.	
William Donald Kibbler	For service to the community and to Australian-Japanese relations.	
Howard Ivan King	For service to the meat industry.	
George Henry Anderson Knowles	For public service and for service to agriculture.	
Harold John Lawrence	For service to secondary industry, particularly in the field of transport.	
Anthony Michael Laws	For service to the community, particularly in the field of alcohol and drug awareness.	
James Willoughby Leedman	For service to the community.	
Aylwin Stuart Leslie	For service to the community.	
Dorothy Leviston	For service to commerce, particularly in the field of small business, and to education.	
Lancelot Hamilton Lines	For service to primary industry.	
Edna Alice Lloyd	For service to the community of Norfolk Island.	
Thomas Leslie Lloyd	For service to the community of Norfolk Island.	
Samuel Stuart McBurney	For public service.	
Thelma Dalzell McCarthy	For service to the community.	
Wendy Maplestone	For service to riding for the disabled.	
Alderman Valerie Hope Marland MBE	For service to local government and to the community.	
David Martin	For service to Australian literature.	
Tony Matisi	For service to the community, particularly the Italian community.	
Colin Henry Meagher	For service to pony clubs and to equestrian sport.	
Doctor William Gerard Meehan	For service to medicine and to the community.	
Kenneth Miller	For service to the credit union movement.	
Doctor Winifred Joyce Mitchell	For service to the community and to tertiary education.	
Eric John Montgomery	For service to the community, particularly in the field of driver education.	
Doctor Graham Jaunay Mount	For service to the dental profession.	
The Most Reverend William Edward Murray	For service to religion.	
Doctor Noel Edward Norman	For service to chemical engineering and to the environment.	
Daniel O'Sullivan	For service to the media.	
Doctor William Kenneth Amadee Paver	For service to medicine, particularly in the field of dermatology.	
Trevor Picker	For service to primary industry, particularly in the growing of superfine wool.	
Osmond Francis William Pitts	For service to the travel industry.	
Alexander Pongrass	For service to soccer.	
Peter John Poulton	For service to the welfare of Vietnam veterans, particularly as Chairman of the Organising Committee for the Australian Vietnam Forces Welcome Home Parade 1987.	
John Launden Prichard	For public service, particularly in the field of dental health.	
Mary Grace Rankine Wilson	For service to occupational therapy.	
Doctor Stanley Edward Reid	For service to yachting and to medicine.	
Doctor Maurice Edward Renshaw	For service to the community.	
Charles Karol Seely	For service to the Australian ginger industry.	
The Honourable David Mayer Selby ED	For service to learning, to legal education, and to the community.	
Doctor Ahmad Muhammad Hadi Shboul	For service to the Islamic community.	
Sidney Sinclair OBE	For service to the wool industry and to the community, particularly the Jewish community.	
Ernest Keith Skillicorn	For service to agriculture and to the management of leprosy in India and Bangladesh.	
Ruth Emma Skillicorn	For service to agriculture and to the management of leprosy in India and Bangladesh.	
John Hamilton Halbert Sleigh	For service to primary industry, particularly the cattle industry.	
Trevor Keith Smith	For service to hockey.	
Professor Jerzy Jaroslaw Smolicz	For service to migrant education.	
Pamela Joy Spry	For service to nursing.	
John Martin Stevens	For service to landscape architecture.	
Clare Grant Stevenson MBE	For service to the community and to the welfare of veterans.	
John Bradridge Studdy	For service to secondary industry and to community health.	
The Reverend Canon Lawrence Edgar Styles	For service to religion and to the community as an industrial chaplain.	
Doctor Harold Lindsay Thompson	For service to medicine.	
George Tongerie	For service to the Aboriginal community.	
Maude Tongerie	For service to the Aboriginal community.	
Bruce John Scott Vasey	For service to local government and to the community.	
Chief Superintendent Michael John Mills Vincent	For service to international relations and to the community.	
Peter Bayford Wells	For service to the community.	
George William Westlake	For service to medicine, particularly as a cardio-thoracic surgeon.	
Professor Jean Primrose Whyte	For service to education, particularly in the field of librarianship.	
Raymond Charles Williams	For public service and for service to the community.	
Phillip David Arundel Wright	For service to primary industry.	
Doctor Dolph Warren Zink	For service to secondary industry and to the community.	

==== Military Division ====
Branch	Recipient	Citation	Notes
Navy	Commodore James Stewart Dickson MBE RAN	For service to the Royal Australia Navy, particularly as Director General of Naval Plans and Policy.	
Navy	Commodore Kelvin Allan Gulliver RAN	For service to the Royal Australia Navy, particularly as the Director General of Recruiting.	
Navy	Captain Anstey Rolfe L'Oste Lindsey RANR	For service to the Royal Australia Navy as the Captain Naval Reserves.	
Navy	Captain Terence Anthony Augustine Roach RAN	For service to the Royal Australia Navy, particularly as the Director of Submarine Warfare.	
Army	Captain Garry Raymond Bannister	For service to the Australia Army, particularly as Instructor, Royal Military College, Duntroon.	
Army	Major Ralph Henderson Bradstreet	For service to the Australia Army Reserve Recruiting in Western Australia.	
Army	Principal Chaplain Gerald Anthony Cudmore	For service to the Australia Army as Principal Chaplain.	
Army	Lieutenant Colonel Brian Eric Irons	For service to the Australia Army as Commanding Officer, 4th Base Workshop Battalion.	
Army	Colonel John William Kingston	For service to the Australia Army in the field of logistics.	
Army	Colonel Ewart John O'Donnell MC	For service as Australia Defence Attache, Philippines.	
Army	Lieutenant Colonel Garry James Spencer	For service to the Australia Army and the Royal Australian Armoured Corps Museum.	
Army	Brigadier Brian Wade	For service to the Australia Army as Commander, Third Military District.	
Army	Major Roderick David White	For service to the Australia Army Reserve in New South Wales.	
Air Force	Air Commodore Leslie Bruce Fisher	For service to the Royal Australia Air Force as Officer Commanding, Royal Australian Air Force Townsville.	
Air Force	Squadron Leader Peter Frederick Gamgee	For service to the Royal Australia Air Force as Director Jindalee Upgrade Project Office.	
Air Force	Wing Commander Ronald Irwin Gretton	For service to the Royal Australia Air Force as an Engineer Officer.	
Air Force	Wing Commander Roger Harrison	For service to the Royal Australia Air Force as Training Flight Commander, No 38 Squadron.	
Air Force	Squadron Leader Andrew Nicholas Mascini	For service to the Royal Australia Air Force as Engineering Officer — Defence Cooperation — Indonesia.	
Air Force	Wing Commander Robert Bruce Treloar	For service to the Royal Australia Air Force as a Staff Officer in the Directorate of Personnel — Officers — Air Force.	

=== Medal (OAM) ===
==== General Division ====
Recipient	Citation	Notes
John Bray Allan	For service to the wool industry, particularly shearing.	
Ernest James Francis Altschwager	For service to local government and to the community.	
Leslie Edward Argoon MM	For service to local government.	
Douglass Ingham Aspinall RFD ED	For service to primary industry and to the community.	
Stanley John Attwood	For service to the community, particularly marine safety.	
Bob Balmer	For service to the welfare of veterans.	
Eileen Mary Balzer	For service to the community.	
Prudence Jane Barbour	For service to child welfare.	
Lucy Barwick	For service to the community.	
Tessa Emelia Beneke	For service to the community, particularly through the Youth Hostel Association.	
Eric Benjamin	For service to social welfare.	
Frederick John Blencowe	For public service as an officer of the Melbourne Metropolitan Transit Authority.	
Lyell John Blogg QPM	For service to the community.	
Norman Richard Blythe	For service to community health.	
Stanley Albert Boreham	For service to the community.	
Carlo Breschi	For service to local government and to the community.	
Raymond James Bright	For service to cricket.	
Viola Beatrice Bromley	For service to the visual arts.	
Donald Graham Brooker	For service to youth and to the community.	
Geoffrey Maurice Brown	For service to surf life saving.	
George Patulla Brown	For service to community welfare.	
Leslie Francis Brown	For service to local government and to the community.	
Robert Charles Brumm	For service to the welfare of veterans.	
Leffler Conrad John Buhmann	For service to the community.	
Pauline Gabrielle Carr	For service to community health.	
Councillor George Felix Cartwright	For service to local government and to the community.	
Ronald Arthur Casey	For service to the media, particularly as a sports commentator.	
Michele Winifred Castagna	For service to people with physical disabilities.	
Keith Reginald Challenger	For service to the trade union movement.	
Norma Isobel Chapman	For service to the community.	
Ronald Clarence Chesher	For service to veterans, to surf life saving and to the community.	
Bruce Osborne Chick	For service to conservation.	
William Henry Collins	For service to the media as a broadcaster and journalist.	
Muriel Jasper Commens	For service to the community, particularly through the Country Women's Association.	
Alexander Powell Cooke	For service to the community and to welfare.	
Frederick George Corben	For service to soccer.	
Peter Daniel Corcoran	For service to rugby league football.	
Ruth Louise Cotterill	For service to the community.	
Robert Craig	For service to community health and welfare.	
Allen Vincent Curtis	For service to the community and to the Real Estate Institute of the Australian Capital Territory.	
John Arthur Cutting	For service to the community.	
Norman George Cuzner	For service to the community, particularly through the Tasmanian Ambulance Service.	
Irwin John Dack DFC	For service to the community.	
Alan Ray David	For service to the community.	
Detective Station Sergeant John Alexander Davies	For public service.	
Alison Anne Davis	For service to the welfare of children.	
Frank De Stefano	For service to the welfare of migrants.	
Stanley Charles Dickson	For service to the trade union movement and to local government.	
Joseph Henry Patrick Dixon	For service to the welfare of veterans.	
Alexander George Dolphin	For service to Australian football.	
Mary Helena Dubois	For service to the community.	
Elisabeth Valder Duff	For service to community health as an occupational therapist.	
Keith John Duke	For service to cricket.	
George William Eaton	For service to youth.	
Joan Patricia Ellard	For service to community welfare.	
John Denis Elliott	For service to the media, particularly in the field of horse racing journalism.	
John Embleton	For service to music, particularly in schools.	
Henry Vaughan Burden Evans	For service to education, particularly in the field of maritime history.	
The Reverend Robert Owen Evans	For service to science, particularly astronomy.	
Roy Herbert Evans	For service to community welfare.	
Ruby Jean Faunt	For service to the community, particularly through the Glen Innes and District Historical Society.	
Phillip Leo Fehon	For service to the community.	
Amelia Marie Findlay	For service to nursing.	
Ronald Alexander Findlay	For service to the community.	
Robina Eugenie Fitz-Gerald	For service to the community, particularly the elderly.	
Martin George Fitzhenry	For service to the community, particularly through bush fire brigades.	
William Francis Flanagan	For service to the community, particularly through radio broadcasting for senior citizens.	
Neil Galt Frankland	For service to the trade union movement and to the community.	
John Friedrich	For service to the community, particularly in the areas of industrial safety and search and rescue services.	
Suzette Gallagher	For service to people with intellectual disabilities.	
Gladys Mary Gilbert	For service to community welfare.	
Sirenne Muriel Gould	For service to people with physical disabilities.	
Robert Lawrence Gradwell	For service to the trade union movement.	
Mary Coman Graham	For service to the community.	
Arthur Donald Gray	For service to tennis.	
Arthur Percy Green	For service to the welfare of veterans.	
Councillor Charie Marino Gregorini	For service to local government.	
Pius Leo Gregory	For service to the Aboriginal community.	
Sidney Francis Gregory	For service to angling.	
Anthony Yale Gresham	For service to golf.	
Allan Maxwell Grice	For service to motor racing.	
Marjorie Helen Hann	For service to the visual arts.	
Doctor Ian Robert Hanson	For service to community health.	
William Archer Harrison	For service to the community.	
Maurice Kierce Hatton	For public service and service to the community.	
Constance Margaret Hicks	For service to lawn bowls.	
David George Holloway	For service to yachting.	
Cyril Claud Hood	For service to the community.	
Edie Hoy Poy	For service to the Chinese community.	
Leslie John Hudson	For service to athletics.	
Lionel Hilton Hughes	For service to the community.	
Francis John Hunt	For service to the welfare of veterans.	
Mervyn Irvine	For service to the community.	
Anthony George Jackson	For service to the martial arts.	
Yvonne James	For service to the Girl Guides Association.	
William Ernest Jennings	For service to education and to the community.	
Barry Campbell Johnston	For service to local government.	
Donald Graham Jolley	For service to sport and recreation for people with disabilities.	
Garth Clement Jubb	For service to the community, particularly to youth.	
Anne Kathleen Kealy	For service to community health.	
Marjorie Valantine Kinane	For service to the community.	
Mavis Jean Kirkham	For service to people with intellectual disabilities.	
Patricia Ellen Kohout	For service to the community.	
Marjory Lilian Lane	For service to the print handicapped and to the Girl Guides Association.	
Colin Robert Lawton	For service to education.	
Lorrimer Victor Leckie	For service to scouting.	
Jan Stefan Lesnicki	For service to the Polish community.	
Robert Anthony Lethbridge	For service to athletics.	
John George Levitzke	For service to the deaf and those with hearing disabilities.	
John Alan Lindley	For service to local government and to the community.	
Jean Dorothy Llewellyn	For service to horticulture, particularly through the Australian Geranium Society.	
The Reverend Brother Romulus Daniel Lyons	For service to education.	
James McClelland	For service to Australian genealogical and historical research.	
Robert Malcolm McCosker	For service to the media, particularly rural journalism.	
Olive Edna McCredie	For service to social welfare, particularly through World Vision.	
Marjorie Elaine McDonald	For service to people with intellectual disabilities.	
Deahnne Mary McIntyre	For service to sport, particularly in track and field and swimming.	
Muriel June McKeon	For service to the poultry industry.	
Jack Donald Cobham McLean	For service to local government and to the community.	
Leslie McNamara	For service to community welfare.	
Keith Albert Mitchell	For service to contract bridge and to the community.	
Edith Ailsa Macklin	For service to the Federation of Parents and Citizens Association.	
Antonio Maniaci	For service to the Italian community.	
Doctor Neil Stanley Mattes	For service to scouting.	
Graeme Charles Milburn	For service to the community.	
Margaret Janette Mitchell	For service to social welfare, particularly through Community Aid Abroad and World Vision.	
Marjorie Florence Monahan	For service to the community.	
Patricia Beryl Moore	For service to the community.	
Grace Moorhouse	For service to the welfare of children in the Republic of Chad.	
Stephen Charles Mortimer	For service to rugby league football.	
Elizabeth Alma Morton	For service to the community, particularly to women and to children.	
Clarence John Murphy	For service to the development of the credit union movement.	
Elizabeth Anne Murray	For public service, particularly to early childhood education.	
Sheila Nicholas	For service to the Sydney University Medical Society.	
Charles Benedict Nolan	For service to the welfare of the elderly and to the community.	
Michael John Norman	For service to education.	
Kenneth Edward Nowland	For service to the Aboriginal community.	
Owen John Nugent	For service to local government and to the community.	
Arthur Leonard Ormsby	For service to the welfare of veterans.	
Joseph Herbert Orr MBE	For service to the community.	
Julie Papandonakis	For service to the Greek community.	
John Alfred Papworth	For service to music and to the community.	
Roman Pavlyshyn	For service to soccer.	
Simon Paul Poidevin	For service to rugby union football.	
Sarah Heriot Russell Potter	For service to the community, particularly through the Pensioner Advancement League.	
Salvatory Puglisi	For service to the fishing industry.	
David Norman Pyne	For public service.	
Colleen Norrie Quinn	For service to hockey.	
John Henry Rafe	For service to the welfare of youth and children.	
Anthony Raheb	For service to the Lebanese community.	
Ingo Renner	For service to gliding.	
Stanley Thomas Reynolds	For service to the community, particularly the Alexandria Fire Brigade and Ambulance Service.	
Chief Inspector Thomas Rippon	For service to the Victoria Police and to the Police Association of Victoria.	
Ali Omar Roude	For service to the Arabic speaking community.	
Howard Adam Salzer	For service to the deaf and those with hearing disabilities.	
Anne Elizabeth Sargeant	For service to netball.	
Lloyd Walter Scott	For service to junior Australian football.	
William Robert Seimons	For service to the community and to local government.	
E Ross Smith	For service to surf lifesaving.	
William Henry Smith	For public service.	
Winifred Jessica Snodgrass	For service to the community.	
Ronald Garth Stephens	For public service.	
Albert Adrian Stobart	For service to the welfare of veterans and to community welfare.	
Donald George Stockins	For service to badminton.	
William Desmond Thomas	For service to the community and to conservation.	
Cecil William Toy	For service to the community and to local government.	
Richard Lloyd Trevaskis	For service to local government and to the community.	
Geraldine Gail Turner	For service to the performing arts.	
Margaret Waddell	For service to nursing.	
James Walshe	For service to the trade union movement.	
John Leone Waters	For service to the trade union movement.	
Leila Loveday Rosemary Watson	For service to music education and to the community.	
Doreen Amelia West	For public service.	
Chief Superintendent James Maxwell Whitbread	For public service.	
Blodwyn Gwladys Whitehead	For service to music.	
Ivan Jack Thomas Wilkinson DFC	For service to the community.	
Ernest Victor Willats	For service to the community.	
Edward Albert Williams	For service to secondary industry.	
Ralph Campbell Wilson	For service to the performing arts.	
Gilbert William Woellner ED	For service to community welfare.	
Graham Edwin Wood	For service to music.	
Len Stanley Wood	For service to surf lifesaving.	
Ron Albert Edward Wootton	For service to water polo.	
Wing Commander Donald Archibald Wright	For service to the community.	
Shirley Margaret Wright	For service to sport and recreation for people with disabilities.	
Michael Wrublewski	For service to sport.	
John Lawrence Young	For service to local government.	

==== Military Division ====
Branch	Recipient	Citation	Notes
Navy	Petty Officer Gavin James Dawe	For service to the Royal Australia Navy as the Anti-Submarine Warfare Director and Sonar Controller in HMAS Canberra.	
Navy	Warrant Officer Carol Judith Lacey	For service to the Royal Australian Navy as the Hospital Patients Division Officer and Alcohol and Drug Programme Administrator at HMAS Penquin.	
Navy	Warrant Officer Graham Anthony Pannell	For service to the Royal Australian Navy as the Support Craft Officer at HMAS Stirling.	
Navy	Warrant Officer Richard Arthur Pearse	For service to the Royal Australian Navy Submarine Squadron.	
Navy	Lieutenant Gunther Suczynski RAN	For service to the Royal Australian Navy as Deputy Marine Engineering Officer of HMAS Darwin.	
Army	Warrant Officer Class Two James Jerome Bolton	For service to the Australian Army in the administration of the Australian Cadet Corps in Victoria	
Army	Warrant Officer Class Two Garry Keith Ernst	For service to the Australian Army in the field of electrical and mechanical engineering.	
Army	Warrant Officer Class One Peter Francis Graham	For service to the Australian Army in the field of training.	
Army	Warrant Officer Class Two Carl Alexander Guy	For service to the Australian Army as the Regimental Quartermaster Sergeant of the Parachute Training School.	
Army	Sergeant Edwin George Howard	For service to the Australian Army in the field of training.	
Army	Warrant Officer Class Two Wayne John Langford	For service to the Australian Army in the field of medical administration.	
Army	Warrant Officer Class One Colin Nelson Lee	For service to the Australian Army as Regimental Sergeant Major of the 3rd Battalion, The Royal Australian Regiment.	
Army	Warrant Officer Class One Peter Francis McCabe	For service to the Australian Army Reserve in South Australia.	
Army	Warrant Officer Class One Lawrence George McGarry	For service to the Australian Army as Regimental Sergeant Major, Training Command.	
Army	Warrant Officer Class Two Darrel John O'Loughlin	For service to the Australian Army in the field of transport.	
Army	Lieutenant John Barham Parsons	For service to the Australian Army as Bandmaster, Australian Defence Force Academy.	
Army	Corporal Zusje Lynann Possingham	For service to the Australian Army Reserve in the Northern Territory.	
Army	Corporal Chester Ray Scaddan	For service to the Australian Army in the field of mechanical recovery.	
Army	Warrant Officer Class One James John Wilkie	For service to the Australian Army as Bandmaster of the 6th Military District Band.	
Air Force	Warrant Officer Graham John Connolly	For service to the Royal Australia Air Force as Senior Non-Commissioned Officer-in-Charge of No. 2 Flying Training School Flight Line.	
Air Force	Flight Sergeant Ronald John Davie	For service to the Royal Australia Air Force as Avionics System Technician at Aircraft Research and Development Unit.	
Air Force	Flight Sergeant Anthony Victor Brace Element	For service to the Royal Australia Air Force in the procurement of a computerised maintenance management system for No. 3 Aircraft Depot.	
Air Force	Sergeant David Clyde Jones	For service to the Royal Australia Air Force and the Royal Australian Air Force Museum, Point Cook.	
Air Force	Warrant Officer Zeon Peter Sztybel	For service to the Royal Australia Air Force as the Housing Officer at Royal Australian Air Force Base Richmond.	
Air Force	Flight Sergeant Eric John Tomes	For service to the Royal Australia Air Force Non-Commissioned Officer-in-Charge, Electrical Section, No. 38 Squadron Richmond.	
Air Force	Warrant Officer Bruce Keith Warnock	For service to the Royal Australia Air Force as the Formation Warrant Officer Disciplinary at Royal Australian Air Force Base Fairbairn.	
