= Admiral West =

Admiral West may refer to:

- Alan West, Baron West of Spithead (born 1948), British Royal Navy admiral
- Barrie West (born 1934), Royal Australian Navy rear admiral
- John West (Royal Navy officer) (1774–1862), British Royal Navy admiral
- Temple West (1714–1757), British Royal Navy vice admiral
