= 1911 SAAFL season =

1911 premiership season
- Date: 6 May - 16 September
- Teams: 5
- Premiers: University; 1st premiership
- Minor premiers: University; 1st minor premiership
- Wooden spooners: Marlborough

The 1911 SAAFL season was the inaugural season of the South Australian Amateur Football League (SAAFL).

The 1911 season commenced on 6 May and concluded on 16 September.

University won the inaugural premiership, after finishing first on the ladder and finishing the season undefeated.

Five clubs competed in the inaugural SAAFL season - Glenferrie, Marlborough, St. Bartholomew, St. Francis Xavier and University. Matches were played at University Oval, Price Oval, and Jubilee Oval.

== Ladder ==
Pos	Team	Pld	W	L	Pts
1	University(P)	12	12	0	24
2	St. Francis Xavier	12	8	4	16
3	St. Bartholomew	12	6	6	12
4	Glenferrie	12	3	9	6
5	Marlborough	12	1	11	2

source: (P) Premiers

== Finals ==
=== Semi Finals ===
	Semi-finals
Saturday, 9 September (1:30pm)	University 11.13 (79)	def.	St. Bartholomew 3.3 (21)	University Oval
Saturday, 9 September (3:30pm)	St. Francis Xaviers 2.5 (17)	def. by	Glenferrie 9.11 (65)	University Oval

=== Grand Final ===
Grand Final
Saturday, 16 September (2:45pm)	University	def.	Glenferrie	University Oval
5.7 (37); 8.9 (47); 10. 14.15 (99)	Q1; Q2; Q3; Final	2.0 (12); 3.7 (25) 5.11 (41)	Umpires: W. Plunkett
Willsmore 5, LeMessurier 4, Wilton 2, G. Goode 2, Drew 1	Goals	Sibley 3, Pile 1, Wallman 1
Londrigan, LeMessurier and Drew	Best	Wallman, S. Clutterbuck, V. Clutterbuck

source for Grand Final:

== Representative ==
On the 29th July, a combined team played the Gawler Association and won 14.12 (96) to 4.4 (28). Goalkickers: Middleton 3, Wilton 3, Giles 2, Grantley 2, Blacket 1, Jervois 1. Best Players: Jervois, Blacket, Drew, Kitson, Wilton, Giles

Player	Team
Blacket J	St. Bartholomew
Burford H	Glenferrie
Drew CF (capt.)	University
Giles D	Glenferrie
Grantley HW	Marlborough
Jervois W	Glenferrie
Kennish HA	St. Bartholomew
Kitson BJ	St. Francis Xavier
LeMessurier FN	University
Londrigan JW	University
Middleton RF	St. Bartholomew
Seymour Smith F	University
Steel KN	University
Taylor B	St. Francis Xavier
Taylor G	Glenferrie
Tymons T (v.c)	St. Francis Xavier
Willsmore HB	University
Wilton AC	University
