= 1912 SAAFL season =

1912 premiership season
- Date: 6 May - 7 September
- Teams: 7
- Premiers: University; 2nd premiership
- Minor premiers: University; 2nd minor premiership
- Wooden spooners: St. Bartholomew

The 1912 SAAFL season was the 2nd season of the South Australian Amateur Football League (SAAFL).

The 1912 season commenced on 6 May and concluded on 7 September.

The league increased the number of teams from 5 to 7 with the acceptance of Semaphore Central and St. Peters College. An application was denied from Prospect for the second year in a row.

Matches were played at University Oval, Prince Alfred College, St. Peters College, Jubilee Oval and in the south parklands opposite the Parkside Hotel.

== Ladder ==
Pos	Team	Pld	W	L	D	Pts
1	University	12	10	2	0	20
2	St. Francis Xavier	12	9	3	0	18
3	Semaphore Central	12	7	5	0	14
4	Glenferrie	12	6	5	1	13
5	St. Peters College	12	4	8	0	8
6	Marlborough	12	3	9	0	6
7	St. Bartholomew	12	2	9	1	5

== Finals ==
=== Semi Finals ===
	Semi-finals
Saturday, 31 August	University 15.15 (105)	def.	Semaphore Central 3.6 (24)	University Oval
Saturday, 31 August	St. Francis Xavier 10.4 (64)	def.	Glenferrie 8.11 (59)	Jubilee Oval

=== Grand Final ===
Grand Final
7 September	University	def.	St. Francis Xavier	University Oval
5.1 (31); 8.3 (51); 10.5 (65); 12.9 (81)	Q1; Q2; Q3; Final	2.3 (15); 4.4 (28); 4.5 (29); 5.11 (41)	Umpires: Zschorn
Le Messurier 5, Willsmore 3, Blacket, Turner, Hayward, Rollison	Goals
