= 1922 SAAFL season =

1922 premiership season
- Date: 5 May - 9 September
- Teams: 7
- Premiers: University
- Runners-up: Semaphore Central
- Minor premiers: University
- Wooden spooners: Y.M.C.A.
- Best and fairest: Hugh Prest (captain of University)

The 1922 SAAFL season was the 8th season of the South Australian Amateur Football League (SAAFL).

The 1922 season commenced on 5 May and concluded on 9 September.

Hugh V. Millard was appointed as Secretary of the SAAFL, which he filled with distinction for 33 years.Hugh had been involved with the Brunswick and Unley Methodist football clubs, and had also played with Kingswood. He was still only 17 upon taking up the appointment.

Prospect had lasted only one season, leaving before the start of the 1922 season to join the YMCA Football Association and then the North Adelaide District Football Association from 1923.

Glenferrie disbanded before the start of the 1922 season, leaving University as the remaining foundation club. Prince Alfred and St. Peters left the SAAFL for the Students Association after terms of 10 and 9 years respectively.

These departures left four vacancies, but only three new clubs in Dulwich (from East Torrens Association playing at Victoria Park Race Course), Goodwood (from United Suburban playing at Millswood Recreational Oval - now Goodwood Oval) and Y.M.C.A. (from the Y.M.C.A. Football Association playing at a ground on Frome Road opposite University Oval), were admitted. Of these clubs, only Goodwood would survive past the Second World War.

== Ladder ==
| Pos | Team | Pld | W | L | Pts |
|---|---|---|---|---|---|
| 1 | University | 12 | 11 | 1 | 22 |
| 2 | Semaphore Central | 12 | 10 | 2 | 20 |
| 3 | Goodwood | 12 | 8 | 4 | 16 |
| 4 | Kingswood | 12 | 6 | 6 | 12 |
| 5 | Dulwich | 12 | 5 | 7 | 10 |
| 6 | Henley & Grange | 12 | 1 | 11 | 2 |
| 7 | Y.M.C.A. | 12 | 1 | 11 | 2 |

== Finals ==
=== Semi Finals ===
| | Semi-finals |
| Saturday, 2 September | University 14.12 | def. | Goodwood 1.7 |
| Saturday, 2 September | Semaphore Central 11.15 | def. | Kingswood 3.4 | University Oval |

=== Final ===
| | Final |
| Saturday, 9 September | University 9.9 | def. | Semaphore Central 8.4 |
