= David Penington =

Australian academic (1930–2023)

David Penington AC
- Born: David Geoffrey Penington; 4 February 1930
- Died: 6 January 2023 (aged 92)
- Education: Carey Baptist Grammar School; Scotch College
- Alma mater: University of Melbourne; University of Oxford
- Awards: Companion of the Order of Australia (1988); Victorian of the Year (2014)

David Geoffrey Penington AC (4 February 1930 – 6 January 2023) was an Australian doctor, academic and Vice-Chancellor of the University of Melbourne.

== Biography ==
Penington was educated at Carey Baptist Grammar School, and later Scotch College, Melbourne (1940–1947). He obtained BM.Bch and later Doctorate in Medicine at the University of Oxford and a Doctorate in Laws (Hon.) at the University of Melbourne. He initially had a career in medicine in the United Kingdom at the London Hospital between 1957 and 1967, and also in Harley Street until 1967. He was then Professor of Medicine from 1970 to 1987 at the University of Melbourne, and Dean of the Faculty of Medicine between 1978 and 1985. He chaired a Committee of Inquiry into the Rights of Private Practice (Medicare Dispute) in 1984 and the National AIDS Task Force 1983–87. He was appointed Vice-Chancellor of the University of Melbourne from 1988 to 1995.

Other positions held by Penington include Chairman National Blood Transfusion Committee, member Council, Australian Red Cross (1977–1983); Director, Nepal Blood Transfusion Aid Project (ADAB & ARCS) (1978–1982); Director, Tianjin (China) Blood Transfusion Aid Project (ADAB & ARCS) (1980–1988); Member of the National Health and Medical Research Council (NH&MRC) (1982–1987); Chair NH&MRC Committee on AIDS and Chair National AIDS Task Force (1983–1987); Chair Victorian Premier's Drug Advisory Committee (1995–1996); Chair of the Victorian Drug Policy Expert Committee (2000); President of the Museums Board of Victoria (1994–2001); Member of the Council of Scotch College (1995–1999); Director of Pacific Dunlop (1991–2000); Chairman of Cochlear Limited (1995–2002); Chairman Neuroscience Victoria (2002–2005); Chairman Bio21 Cluster (2002–2007); and Chairman Bionic Vision Australia (2009–2013).

Penington was appointed a Companion of the Order of Australia (AC) in the 1988 Australia Day Honours for services to medicine and to the community, particularly in the field of medical education and health care.

Penington died on 6 January 2023, at the age of 92.

== Published works ==
- Penington, David (July 2010). Making Waves: Medicine, Public Health, Universities and Beyond (hardback). Carlton, Victoria: Miegunyah Press. ISBN 9780522857443.

Academic offices
Preceded by	Vice-Chancellor of The University of Melbourne; 1988-1995	Succeeded by Alan Gilbert
