= Paul Rofe (barrister) =

Paul Rofe QC

1st Director of Public Prosecutions (South Australia)
- In office 1992–2004
- Premier: John Bannon; Lynn Arnold; Dean Brown; John Olsen; Rob Kerin; Mike Rann
- Governor: Dame Roma Mitchell; Sir Eric Neal; Marjorie Jackson-Nelson
- Succeeded by: Stephen Pallaras QC

Personal details
- Born: Paul John Lawrence Rofe; 1948
- Died: 7 May 2013 Adelaide
- Cause of death: Heart failure
- Education: Saint Ignatius' College, Adelaide
- Alma mater: University of Adelaide
- Occupation: Barrister; Director of Public Prosecutions
Australian rules football career
Personal information
- Original team: Adelaide University
Playing career
Years	Club	Games (Goals)
1966–1976	Adelaide University	224
Career highlights
- Amateur All-Australian Captain; AAFC National Carnival Medalist

Paul John Lawrence Rofe QC (1948–2013) was a prominent South Australian criminal barrister and the former South Australian Director of Public Prosecutions, a position he held from 1992 to 2004.

== Education and career ==
Rofe was educated at Saint Ignatius' College, Adelaide. He was School Captain in 1965 and completed his Leaving Honours in the same year. He graduated from the Law School of the University of Adelaide with an LL.B. and was admitted to practice in 1973. In 1974, he was a judge's associate to Justice Walters and then to The Honourable Dr John Bray Chief Justice of the Supreme Court of South Australia. Early in his career, Rofe worked as a counsel assisting the Coroner before he joined the Crown Prosecutor's Office in 1977. He was appointed a QC in 1991, and assumed office in 1992.

He was well known for his involvement in football, both as a player and administrator. He was a Director of the Adelaide Crows Football Club from 1999 to 2003.

During his career as a prosecutor, Rofe successfully prosecuted some of South Australia's most notorious murder trials, including Bevan Spencer von Einem, Henry Keogh, and David Szach.

== Controversy ==
In 1996 he publicly apologised following his conviction for drink-driving with a blood alcohol level of 0.178. He was fined and banned from driving for 15 months. He was reappointed for a further seven-year term as DPP in May 1999. Although he suffered a mild stroke later that year, and had to take leave, he was still able to continue as DPP.

Controversy erupted in February 2003 over revelations by Channel 7's Today Tonight program that during office hours, he had visited a TAB betting shop, or bought ‘scratchies’ up to 17 times in one day. More controversy arose in July 2003 over his plea-bargaining in the case of Paul Nemer. This led to a confrontation with the Government in which he was directed by the Attorney-General to appeal the leniency of the sentence imposed upon Nemer for shooting a newspaper delivery man in 2002. The Solicitor-General, Chris Kourakis QC, reviewed the matter at the request of the Government. In his report, issued in April 2004, the Solicitor-General found that some aspects of Mr Rofe's handling of the conduct of the prosecution of Nemer were ‘inept’. Rofe wrote his own 'robust' report concerning the handling of the Nemer case, largely in response to the Kourakis Report, but the Attorney-General, Michael Atkinson, refused to release it, despite media attempts to procure the report.

== Legacy ==
Mr Rofe resigned as DPP in May 2004 and he began working as a barrister in July 2004.

Soon after Rofe's departure from the Office of the Director of Public Prosecutions, the then President of the Law Society of South Australia, David Howard, acknowledged that Rofe's 'fairness, integrity and generally sound judgment are legendary'. Rofe was also acknowledged by the Acting Director of Public Prosecutions, Wendy Abraham QC, as 'a fearless prosecutor who regularly sparked public interest in difficult and complex policy issues'.

Legal offices
New office	Director of Public Prosecutions (SA); 1992–2004	Succeeded by Stephen Pallaras QC
