= Emily Sadka =

Singaporean historian and university teacher (1920–1968)

- Born: 1920; Singapore
- Died: 19 July 1968 (aged 47); Perth, Western Australia
- Education: St. Hilda's College, Oxford (BA) Australia National University (PhD)
- Occupations: Historian, academic
- Known for: Research about Malaysia
- Relatives: Sassoon Samuel Sadka (father); Sarah Sadka (mother); Mercy Sadka (sister); Moshe Sadka (great uncle)
- Awards: British Malayan Queen's Scholarship; Carnegie Grant

Emily or Emma Sadka (1920 – 19 July 1968) was an Singaporean historian and researcher specialising in the political history of the Malayan region, which she taught at the University of Malaya (Singapore), the Victoria University of Wellington and Australian National University.

== Early life ==
Sadka was the eldest daughter of Sassoon Samuel Sadka and his wife, Sarah, Jews originating from Baghdad. She was the grandniece of Moshe Sadka, the Chief Rabbi of Baghdad, and the cousin of Singapore Chief Minister David Marshall. Her younger sister Mercy Sadka was the first female neurologist in Western Australia.

She studied at the Raffles Girls' School from 1928 to 1935, then joined the special Scholarship Class at Raffles Institute, in 1935, at the age of 16. She was underage for the examination at that time and sat again the following year. In December 1937, it was announced that she had won the British Malayan Queen's Scholarship that provided pass to and back from England, together with the cost of education at Oxford, Cambridge, or any other university, for up to four years. She had been the first Jewish woman to have won this scholarship. Other winners were Lim Chong Eu (18) of the Penang Free School who would go on to become Chief Minister of Penang, Chin Kim Hong (19) of the King Edward VIII School in Taiping and Mohamed Ismail bin Mohamed Ali (19) of Victoria Institution in Selangor. She read modern history at St. Hilda's College, Oxford where she obtained a BA (first-class honours) degree in history in 1941.

She learnt Russian and the Scandinavian languages and in 1942, won a Carnegie Grant to carry out research in Soviet Administration in the former Czarist colonies of Central Asia. In 1946, she had attended the London County Council evening classes in literature and current events and gave a series of talks on the Soviet Union for the Marylebone Literary Institute. She had also served on the committee of the International Youth Centre in London. By September 1947, she was in Australia on break, her work on the subject was nearing completion, and she was planning the presentation of her doctoral thesis to take place in England in 1948.

== Career ==
=== University of Malaya ===
She joined the University of Malaya in Singapore as Assistant Lecturer in August 1951.

In June 1953, she was elected Secretary of the Malayan Historical Society (Singapore) under Professor Cyril Northcote Parkinson.

=== Sieveking Expedition ===
In August 1953, the only woman in the team, Sadka, having resigned, left on an expedition headed by Acting Director of Museums Gale Sieveking, to investigate the ancient settlement of Kota Batu, a site at Johor Lama, up the Johor River, and probe the remains of two boats embedded in the river's banks. Pieces of 17th to 18th century Chinese pottery were found among the remains of one of the boats. A local in the area showed them a bowl of Siamese origin that had been found filled with gold coins. According to that owner the coins were subsequently melted down and the gold, sold. Besides Sadka and Sieveking, the expedition also comprised Paul Wheatley of the University of Malaya, Carl Alexander Gibson-Hill of the Raffles Museum, Tony Beamish of Radio Malaya, Michael Tweedie of the Singapore Museum, Oswald Theseira of the F.M.S. Museum, Naval Commander-in-Chief (Far East Station) Vice Admiral Sir Charles Lambe, John Senior of the British Army, Wong Lin Ken, Clement Hon, Wang Gungwu. The excavation made an important find. This was the first time that the use of masonry in Malay fortifications had been recorded. Of equal importance, the expedition's surveys allowed for more accurate orientation of the internal geography of that settlement. The remains of an ancient Chinese trading ship were also a result of the excavations there.

=== Journal of Sir Hugh Low ===
Sadka believed that Hugh Low, third British resident at Perak, was "one of the greatest of Malaya's administrators", but noted that he had been neglected by writers of Malayan history, with only passing references made in the notes made by Swettenham and Winstedt. At that time his private papers could not be located and much of Perak's official records, and those of the Colonial Secretary's Office in Singapore had been destroyed during the Japanese Occupation of Malaya. The only thing remaining at that time was the first volume of his handwritten journals, at that time kept at the Federal Secretariat in Kuala Lumpur [and now kept at the National Archives of Malaysia, Kuala Lumpur], that spanned his first eight weeks in Perak (19 April to 15 June 1877). Sadka worked on deciphering, and transcribing and correcting the text of this manuscript. It was published, two years later, in 1955.

=== Malayan historical materials in Australia ===
While carrying out research at the Australian National University, Sadka discovered that there was enough material in Canberra for students to use as a sound basis of Malayan history. She was, at that time, preparing a thesis on The Residential System of Government in the States of Malaya from 1874 to 1895.

=== Graduate study at Australian National University ===
Sadka was awarded a research scholarship at the National Australian University in 1954. She had been recruited by Jim Davidson, Professor of Pacific History at the Research School of Pacific (and Asian) Studies, as one of the Australian National University's first doctoral candidates. Her thesis was later revised and published as "The Protected Malay States 1874–1875". While living in the ANU's University House, she became a kind of "moral muse" and confident for fellow-student and future Australian Prime Minister Bob Hawke. The degree was awarded in 1960.

=== Victoria University (NZ) ===
Sadka began her teaching of Southeast Asian History in New Zealand as Assistant Lecturer at the Victoria University of Wellington. Sadka's undergraduate class in Southeast Asian history was considered innovative for 1958 New Zealand. Historian Anthony Reid, who had not previously studied history at school, became interested while at the University. He thereafter obtained a BA degree and an MA degree in Wellington, and a PhD degree in history at Cambridge (1965), and would eventually succeed Sadka at ANU.

=== Return to Australian National University ===
Jim Davidson brought Sadka back to his Department of Pacific History, Research School of Pacific (and Asian) Studies, Australian National University in 1960 as a Research Fellow, promoted in 1962 to a tenured Fellowship after the resignation of John Bastin. In the 1960s, she supervised a number of dissertations on Malaysian history.

=== Early death ===
Sadka died on 19 July 1968 in Perth, Western Australia, the same year her revised thesis in book form, "The Protected Malay States, 1874–1895", was published.

Three boxes of her handwritten drafts and extracts from various journals are kept at the National Library of Australia, and at the Australian National University's Library.

== Bibliography ==
- 1968: The protected Malay States, 1874-1895
- 1964: "The Colonial Office and the Protected Malay States" [in Malayan and Indonesian studies : essays presented to Sir Richard Winstedt on his 85th birthday]
- 1963: "Malaysia: The Political Background" [in The Political Economy of Independent Malaya: A Case-study in Development: 28–58]
- 1962: "The State Councils in Perak and Selangor", 1877–1895 [in Papers on Malayan History: 89-119]
- 1962: "Singapore and the Federation: Problems of Merger" [in Asian Survey 1(11):17–25]
- 1960: The Residential System in the Protected Malay States, 1874–1895
- 1957: "Constitutional Change in Malaya: A Historical Perspective" [in Australian Outlook, 2: 17-30]
- 1955: The Journal of Sir Hugh Low, Perak, 1877
