= Joyce Fitzpatrick =

Australian education advocate

Joyce Fitzpatrick AO
- Born: 15 July 1922; Adelaide, South Australia, Australia
- Died: 21 January 2018 (aged 95); Adelaide, South Australia, Australia
- Occupation: educator
- Known for: instituting reforms in South Australian schools to enable parents to play a more pivotal role

Marjory Joyce Fitzpatrick AO (née Cawte, 15 July 1922 – 21 January 2018) was an Australian education advocate, author and a flight sergeant with the Women's Auxiliary Australian Air Force.

Fitzpatrick is credited with helping institute reforms in South Australia which enabled parents to have more input in how their children's schools were managed.

== Early life ==
Fitzpatrick was born in Torrensville in the western suburbs of Adelaide, her father being a school headmaster. During her childhood, Fitzpatrick's family moved around South Australia living in such places as Streaky Bay, Waikerie, Solomontown and Plympton.

She attended Adelaide High School but left early to pursue employment as a secretary.

== World War II ==
In 1941, following the outbreak of the Second World War, Fitzpatrick joined the Women's Auxiliary Australian Air Force and relocated to Melbourne initially to assist with the shortage of male telegraphists.

However, she rose to the rank of flight sergeant with the Z Force unit.

== Education reforms ==
Fitzpatrick married Ron Fitzpatrick, a Rat of Tobruk who she had met at a Melbourne railway station in 1942.

With her husband becoming a school headmaster, the couple moved around South Australia and lived in various communities such as Whyalla, Coonalbyn, Bowman, Moorak, Port Augusta and Morphett Vale.

Fitzpatrick began lobbying for parents to have a stronger role within the schools their children attended, and ultimately became the president of the South Australian Association of School Parents Communities. In 1975, Fitzpatrick was one of the delegates who spoke at a rally of the Southern Eyre Peninsula Schools Welfare Association where she argued for a new scheme to assist high school students who were required to leave the local area for the final two years of secondary education.

Fitzpatrick is credited with instituting sweeping reforms in the 1980s which enabled parents to have a better say in how their children's school were being managed. She was frequently invited to speak at education seminars and conduct workshops for parents.

== Later life ==
Fitzpatrick had a great interest in writing and in 1987 wrote a biography recounting the life of Edith Strangway which was published in The Aboriginal and Islander Health Worker Journal.

In 1997 she helped establish a writer's group in Goolwa called "Sand Writers" where she wrote numerous short stories and poems which were published by the group.

In 2007, Fitzpatrick and her husband invited eight World War II veterans to come together and share their wartime stories which were published in a book, The Stories of Us.

Her husband Ron Fitzpatrick died at the age of 94 in 2013.

Joyce Fitzpatrick died in Adelaide on 21 January 2018.

== Honours ==
In the 1988 Australia Day Honours, Fitzpatrick was appointed as an Officer of the Order of Australia for her service to education.

== Bibliography ==
Year	Title	Notes
1987	I Was Born On The Finke	Biography recounting the life of Edith Strangway first published in The Aboriginal Child at School (June/July 1987 Volume 15 Issue 3) and The Aboriginal and Islander Health Worker Journal (June 1987 Volume 11 Issue 2)
1997	Trio con Arioso	Short story published in Sand Writers (Summer 1997 Volume 1 Issue 2)
1997	Houlihan's Lament	short story published in Sand Writers (Winter 1997 Volume 1 Issue 1)
1997	Mind Shadows	short story published in Sand Writers (Winter 1997 Volume 1 Issue 1)
1998	Iron Bottom Sound (Guadalcanal: 1942–1998)	poem published in Sand Writers Poetry
1998	Things I Don't See Often Any More	poem published in Sand Writers Poetry
1998	O Fat White Woman	poem published in Sand Writers Poetry.
1998	There was an old man on the Fleurieu?	poem published in Sand Writers Poetry
1998	A Love Story	short story published in Sand Writers (Summer 1998 Volume 1 Issue 4)
2000	Carolina Jessamine	short story published in Stories of Mystery and Romance (Spring 2000 Volume 1 Issue 3)
2000	No Man's Land	short story published in Sand Writers (Winter 2000 Volume 1 Issue 7)
2000	Ophelia	short story published in Stories of Courage and Exploration (Autumn 2000 Volume 1 Issue 1)
2002	Encounters	periodical edited by Joyce Fitzpatrick, Vivienne Causby and Liz Sutherland
