= Eve Fesl =

Australian academic

- Born: Evelyn Serico; 21 August 1930
- Died: 12 August 2023 (aged 92)
- Education: Monash University
- Occupations: Academic, language expert, athlete
- Known for: First Indigenous Australian to receive a PhD from an Australian university
- Notable work: Fesl, Eve D (1993), Conned!, University of Queensland Press, ISBN 978-0-7022-2497-3

Eve Mumewa Doreen Fesl AM, (born Evelyn Mumewa Doreen Serico; 21 October 1930 – 12 August 2023), was an academic in sociolinguistic policy and implementation. She was a member of both the Gubbi Gubbi and Gungulu nations, and became the first Indigenous Australian to receive a PhD from an Australian university in 1989. She also had a significant athletic career.

== Early life and education ==
Evelyn Mumewa Doreen Serico was born on 21 October 1930, the first child of Maurice and Evelyn Reen (née Monkland-Olsen) Serico. Evelyn Reen was a Gubbi Gubbi person, while Maurice was of the Gungulu nation. The family initially lived on a sheep station. Her mother was forcibly removed to the Barambah Aboriginal Reserve (now called Cherbourg) under the Aboriginals Protection Act, and she grew up on the reserve. An Englishman who brought books to the reserve inspired her mother to give her children a good education, so she moved her family to Brisbane for that reason.

After moving to Brisbane, Fesl encountered racism at Ashgrove State School. She took up athletics to demonstrate that she could beat one of her classmates. She later learnt German and topped the state in her year of HSC but failed English. Her German score allowed her to study linguistics at Monash University. She later completed honours in anthropology, graduate diploma in international law and finally a PhD in 1989, documenting her mother's native Gubbi Gubbi language. This made her the first Indigenous Australian to receive a PhD from an Australian university.

== Sporting career ==
Fesl is a former champion discus thrower of Victoria and Queensland,

In her youth, she was a versatile track and field athlete, competing in running, throwing and jumping events. She competed for Kelvin Grove in Queensland athletics. She moved to Melbourne in 1956 in an attempt to get into the Australian Olympic team. Her throw of 116 feet 3 inches (35.43 m) was fifth in the qualifying event on 13 October 1956.

== Government and academic career ==
Fesl worked as a liaison officer and assistant to Sir Douglas Nicholls in the Victorian Ministry for Aboriginal Affairs for some time. She then worked in academia, in sociolinguistic policy and implementation, specialising in First Nations languages.

In 1977, she was appointed as a temporary research assistant in the Centre for Research into Aboriginal Affairs at Monash University. This was followed by her appointment as secretary at the centre in 1978, and three years later she succeeded Professor Colin Bourke as director. The centre was later renamed the Koorie Research Centre, and Fesl remained head until 1993. Along with Professor Merle Ricklefs and in consultation with Aboriginal leaders, Fesl helped to develop programmes to increase the low numbers of Indigenous students at the university.

Fesl was associate professor in the Faculty of Education, and Convenor of Murri Programs at Griffith University.

As of 2021 Fesl lectured at the Queensland University of Technology's Oodgeroo Unit.

== Other activities ==
Fesl was also a conservation activist for various local causes, such as stopping the Mary River in Queensland from being dammed, and preventing the development of a freeway in Nunawading, Victoria. The latter cause led to her election as a local councillor. She was a member of the Save the Kangaroo Committee in Victoria in 1970.

She was also a member of several national bodies, including the Advisory Council on Multicultural Affairs, the National Museum of Australia's Aboriginal Advisory Committee, the Aboriginal Literature Board, and the Aboriginal Arts Board of the Australian Council of the Arts.

=== Book ===
In 1993 Fesl published the book Conned!, which was a political history of the colonisation of Australia as seen from an Aboriginal perspective. The book shows the deleterious effects of the imperialism, domination of and European social philosophies, and also compares the situation of First Nations in Australia as compared with North America. In 1991, the manuscript of Conned! was Highly Commended for the 1991 David Unaipon Award in the Queensland Premier's Literary Awards.

== Recognition and honours ==
Fesl was awarded "Scholar of the Year" in the 1986 NAIDOC Awards.

She was made Member of the Order of Australia in the 1988 Australia Day Honours and a Centenary Medal in 2001.

Following her mother's death in 2005, Fesl became the senior spokesperson for the Gubbi Gubbi people.

In December 2016, she was awarded a United Nations Association of Australia award, for "community work and past achievements".

== Personal life ==
Fesl's younger brother, Nurdon, became Queensland's first neuro radiographer in 1968.

She married a German man, Franz Fesl.

== Death and legacy ==
Fesl died on 12 August 2023.

Her contribution to the documentation of the Gubbi Gubbi language was very valuable, and her 1993 book Conned! continues to provide insight to the history of Australia.

In 2024, Dr Eve Fesl First Nations Black Swans Award was established as a new award in the Australian Netball Awards. The award recognises a First Nations Australia national netball team player who has "demonstrated high standards of integrity and high-performance behaviours, as well as significant cultural leadership". In that year, the award was sponsored by the Confident Girls Foundation.
