= Bob Neil =

Australian rules footballer

Personal information
- Full name: Robert H. Neil
- Born: Adelaide, South Australia

Playing career^{1}
Years	Club	Games (Goals)
1974–1993	Adelaide University	236
- ^{1} Playing statistics correct to the end of 1993.

Bob Neil is a former amateur Australian rules footballer who played with the Adelaide University Football Club in the South Australian Amateur Football League (SAAFL).

Neil played his first match in 1974, playing over 200 games in 20 years at the club. He has served in various capacities at the club as player, coach and committee member. A down-to-earth guy, the club adopted him as the official club legend because he represented exactly what the club stood for. The football club has used his name on all manner of club merchandise including the official club website bobneil.com.

In 2014, Neil was named as a South Australian Living Legend. His fame and notoriety have grown around the world over the years.
