= Mercy Sadka =

Australian neurologist

Marie Sadka AO (22 July 1923 – 28 January 2001) was a Singapore-born neurologist who spent most of her career in Western Australia. Better known as Mercy Sadka, she was Australia's first female neurologist.

== Early life and education ==
Sadka was born in Singapore on 22 July 1923. She was the second daughter of Sassoon Samuel Sadka and his wife, Sarah who were of Jewish heritage. Her older sister Emily Sadka (1920–1968) was an historian. She educated at Raffles Girls School and later Cheltenham Ladies College in England. She graduated from the University of Oxford in 1947 with a Bachelor of Medicine, Bachelor of Surgery.

== Career ==
Sadka moved to Australia in 1948 as resident medical officer at the Royal Perth Hospital (RPH). She worked with ophthalmologist Ida Mann on a study of blindness among Indigenous Australians in the Kimberley.

Postgraduate studies in neurology took her to London and Boston, where she worked at Massachusetts General Hospital with Raymond Adams, Miller Fisher and Robert Schwab.

Returning to Western Australia in 1959, she was appointed consultant neurologist at RPH. In the same year, she introduced the use of electroencephalography (EEG) to Western Australia. She also opened the Stroke Rehabilitation Unit in the Shenton Park Annex of RPH.

Sadka was appointed an Officer of the Order of Australia in the 1988 Australia Day Honours for "service to medicine, particularly in the field of neurology".

Sadka retired in 1988. She died on 28 January 2001.
