= David David (surgeon) =

Professor David David AC
- Born: David John David; 21 December 1940 (age 85)
- Citizenship: Australian
- Education: Rostrevor College
- Known for: Craniofacial surgery
- Awards: Companion of the Order of Australia (1988); SA Australian of the Year (2018)
Australian rules football career
Personal information
- Position: ruck rover/Half-back flank
Playing career
Years	Club	Games (Goals)
1959–1963	Sturt Football Club	27
- Cricket career

Cricket information

Domestic team information
- Years: Team
- 1963–1967: Adelaide University Cricket Club
- 1967: Finchley Cricket Club
- Website: www.ddms.com.au

Professor David John David AC (born 21 December 1940) is an Australian surgeon. He is a specialist in the area of craniofacial surgery and plastic & reconstructive surgery of the Head and Neck. He was the founder of the Australian Craniofacial Unit.

David was created a Companion of the Order of Australia in the 1988 Australia Day Honours. He was named 2018 South Australian Australian of the Year in October 2017.

An alumnus of Rostrevor College, David retired from clinical practice on 30 June 2018 but continues to teach in medical surgery and allied professions as Clinical Professor of Craniofacial Surgery at the University of Adelaide.

The Australian Craniofacial Unit was founded in Adelaide by David in 1975. It remains one of only two such units in the world (the other is in Dallas). Before establishing the unit in Adelaide, he studied under Paul Tessier in France, who is regarded as the father of modern craniofacial surgery.

== Personal ==
David has been married twice. He has four children and nine grandchildren with his first wife. He married Bronwyn in 2016.

While at university, he played for the Sturt Football Club then Adelaide University Cricket Club. He won the Bradman Medal for best A-grade cricketer in the 1966–67 season. When he moved to England to continue his studies, he played for Finchley Cricket Club in the Middlesex County Cricket League and played with and against international players.
