= Sidney Sinclair =

English-Australian businessman (1915–1999)

Sidney Sinclair (1915–1999) was an English born, Australian businessman, philanthropist, trade advisor to the Federal Government and prominent member of the Australian Jewish community. A founder of the Parramatta Synagogue, he was its first president and subsequent life member. He joined the Board of the Great Synagogue in 1966 and was president from 1977 to 1980; He was later made a life member of the board and was highly regarded as a congregational elder statesman.

From 1993 he was a director of Austcare the Australian organisation that cares for refugees worldwide, and vice-chairman by 1995.

A past president of the Australian Jewish Welfare Society in NSW (now called Jewish Care) , he was senior vice-president and subsequently president of the Federation of Australian Jewish Community Services. A councillor of the NSW Jewish War Memorial and a member of the Executive Council of Australian Jewry, he was also a trustee of the Goulburn Jewish cemetery.

With his cousin, Louis Klein, he founded the men's fashion companies Anthony Squires , Parini and Sax Altman

With Eric Hurst (an optometrist) and Dino Zingarelli (a spectacle frame expert), Sinclair founded Martin Wells, the maker of fashion spectacle frames.

A longtime member of South Sydney Rotary, he was made a Rotary International Paul Harris Fellow in 1994.

In 1968 Sir John McEwan, Minister for Trade and Industry, appointed Sinclair to the Export Development Council. In 1972 Dr Jim Cairns appointed him to the Trade Development Council, and in 1974 he became a member of its executive. While serving on the EDC he was a member of a small group sent on Diplomatic Good Will Missions sent to the USSR, Poland, Romania, Czechoslovakia and Japan.

He was a member of the Australia-Japan Business Cooperation Committee and of a federal study group on Japan; for six years he was a member of a federal advisory panel on East European countries. He was chairman of a federal study panel to encourage small business to export. He was a constant adviser to governments on both sides of politics, and for 2 years was one of 3 people who advised Prime Minister Gough Whitlam at pre-budget meetings to be used for cabinet briefings, and was appointed to several advisory committees by Deputy Prime minister, Douglas Anthony .

Sinclair was made an Officer of the Order of the British Empire (OBE) in December 1978. He was made a Member of the Order of Australia (AM) in January 1988.
