= Barrie West =

Barrie Lawson West
- Born: 11 January 1934 (age 92); Christchurch, New Zealand
- Military career
- Allegiance: Australia
- Branch: Royal Australian Navy
- Service years: 1952–1989
- Rank: Rear Admiral
- Conflicts: Korean War; Indonesia–Malaysia confrontation
- Awards: Officer of the Order of Australia

Rear Admiral Barrie Lawson West, AO (born 11 January 1934) is a retired senior supply officer in the Royal Australian Navy (RAN).

== Naval career ==
West joined the RAN as a midshipman in 1952. He trained in Australia and the United Kingdom, then served in the Korean War and the Malaysian Confrontation.

In 1968, he became an exchange officer with the United States Navy for three years.

On his return to Australia, West spent 12 years in Canberra, Australian Capital Territory, at the Navy Headquarters, including postings as:

- Secretary to the Chief of Naval Staff (as a captain)
- Deputy Chief of Naval Materiel (as commodore)

In 1984, West undertook studies at the Royal College of Defence Studies at Belgravia, London.

West was promoted to rear admiral on 10 May 1985 and appointed as Chief of Naval Materiel, on the retirement of Rear Admiral Bill Rourke. He retired from the Royal Australian Navy in 1989.

== Awards ==
West was made an Officer of the Order of Australia (Military Division) in the 1988 Australia Day Honours for services to the navy as Chief of Naval Materiel. He is also entitled to wear the National Medal with clasp.
