= Max Basheer =

Australian football administrator (1927–2025)

Max Basheer AM
- Born: 9 May 1927
- Died: 14 September 2025 (aged 98)
- Education: University of Adelaide
- Occupations: Lawyer, SANFL administrator
- Known for: Involvement with Adelaide Football Club, integrating South Australian sides into the AFL
- Honours: SANFL Hall of Fame (2003); AFL Hall of Fame (2005)

Max Rafeek Basheer AM (9 May 1927 – 14 September 2025) was an Australian football administrator and lawyer. He was the longest-serving administrator with the South Australian National Football League (SANFL). He was involved in a number of key decisions affecting the SANFL from the 1970s to the 1990s, ultimately leading to the inclusion of two South Australian sides in the Australian Football League (AFL).

== Early life and education ==
Max Rafeek Basheer was born on 9 May 1927 in Adelaide, South Australia, to Archie and Labeebee Basheer, who were Lebanese immigrants to Australia who were of Druze ethnicity. He was the fifth of six children. His father first migrated to South Australia in 1896 to work at the Port Pirie smelter, returning to Lebanon between 1913 and 1925, where he married and had his first four children. He grew up in Kalangadoo in the South East, where his parents ran the Kalangadoo Hotel.

He attended Prince Alfred College in Adelaide, where he played Australian rules football.

He obtained a law degree from the University of Adelaide Law School, and was admitted to the Bar in 1951. He played football for the University of Adelaide while a student.

== Career ==
=== Football ===
In the early 1950s Basheer was a state amateur rover who was denied a SANFL League football career when North Adelaide refused to clear him to Sturt.

In 1954 he began his career in football administration when he was appointed honorary solicitor to the South Australian Amateur Football League. He was also a commissioner on the league's tribunal from 1954 to 1960. He was SANFL Commissioner from 1962 to 1966.

In 1966, he represented several football clubs and other businesses in the royal commission into South Australian liquor licensing laws.

Basheer served as senior vice president in 1967, and then president in 1978, of the SANFL. He was president for 25 years until 2003, making him the longest-serving president. This was a period in which, over and above the usual administrative tasks, he oversaw the building of Football Park at West Lakes in Adelaide, which became the SANFL's headquarters in 1971. He also engaged in the long battle to get lights installed in the stadium, which took six and a half years and entailed a judicial inquiry, a royal commission, and a hearing in the Supreme Court.

As SANFL president in the 1990s, he also presided over the introduction of South Australia's two AFL teams, Adelaide and Port Adelaide. He said at the time of his retirement in 2003, "The most difficult time of all, without any doubt, was 1990, when Port Adelaide defected, or tried to, from the SANFL, to get that first licence, because we saw that time as being the most critical in the history of the SANFL". It was regarded by many as his greatest achievement, standing firm against the VFL, leading to the creation of the AFL, with two participating SA teams.

He was also chairman of the SA Football Commission from 1990 to 2003. Other roles in football held by Basheer included:

- SANFL Management Committee, 1969–1979 (chairman 1978–1979)
- SANFL Commissioner for Country and Junior Football, 1971–1978 (chairman 1978)
- Football Park Finance and Development Committee, 1975–1989 (chairman 1978)
- Foundation South Australia trustee, 1988–1992
- Australian Football Hall of Fame Committee, 1996–2002
- SA Football Hall of Fame Committee, 2001–2025

=== Law ===
Basheer was also a successful lawyer. From 1954 to 1992, Basheer was a partner, and then senior partner (1966–92) with the law firm Povey Waterhouse & Basheer.

In 1992, Basheer became a partner with Reilly Basheer Downs & Humphries, and finally with DBH Lawyers, formerly Duncan Basheer Hannon, until his retirement in 2019.

== Other roles and activities ==
Basheer was the director of Basheers Strathmore Hotel P/L; chairman of the Woodville Hotel P/L; and chairman of Samarkand P/L.

== Recognition ==
- Australian Sports Medal
- 1972: SANFL life membership
- 1988: Member of the Order of Australia, for services to the game of Australian football
- 1996: AFL life membership
- 2003: Inducted to the SANFL Hall of Fame
- 2003: Inducted to the Australian Football Hall of Fame

== Death and legacy ==
Basheer died on 14 September 2025, at the age of 98. The Premier of South Australia, Peter Malinauskas, posted a tribute to Basheer, saying "Few South Australians have left such an indelible mark on our sporting culture".

The Max Basheer Reserve, which formerly adjoined Football Park and was used as a training oval for the Adelaide Football Club until 2015, was named in honour of Basheer's contributions to the game.

The Max Basheer Stand in the Adelaide Oval is named after him.

== Personal life ==
Basheer married Elaine Christobel Basheer, and they had two children.
