= Adelaide University Football Club =

Australian rules amateur football club

The Blacks

Names
- Full name: Adelaide University Football Club
- Nickname(s): The Blacks; AUFC; Uni
- Motto: The World's Greatest Football Club
- Club song: Green Ginger Wine

A Grade 2022 season
- After finals: Men - 8th; Women - 7th
- Home-and-away season: Men - 8th; Women - 7th
- Leading goalkicker: Men - Matthew Langridge; Women - Ruth Wallace
- Best and fairest: Men - Seb Paynter; Women - Sophie Li

Club details
- Founded: 1906; 120 years ago
- Colours: Black, White, Grey
- Competition: Adelaide Footy League; Intervarsity; SAWFL
- President: Michael Dadds
- Chairperson: Matthew Allan
- Coach: Dwaine Kretschmer
- Captain: Ben Adams
- Premierships: A Grade (Men) (Division 1): 1911, 1912, 1920, 1921, 1922, 1926, 1929, 1932, 1951, 1952, 1954, 1955, 1960, 1961, 1962, 1965, 1968, 1969, 1974, 1975, 1986, 1996, 1999 A Grade (Women) (Division 1): 2017
- Grounds: University Oval (capacity: 100,000)
- Park 10

Uniforms
Home	Away	Clash

Other information
- Official website: uniblacksfc.com.au

The Adelaide University Football Club Inc. (AUFC) is a South Australian based amateur Australian rules football club. It is an affiliate of the Adelaide University Sports Assoc. and plays in the Adelaide Footy League (former "South Australian Amateur Football League"). The club promotes itself as the largest amateur football club in Australia. The club trains on University Oval located across the river from the University which forms part of Park 12, and Park 10 in the portion of the Adelaide Parklands between the University and North Adelaide. It is one of the most decorated clubs in the university's history. The club has played in every season of the SAAFL competition, won 23 Division 1 premierships, had 8 Division 1 medallists, 48 state players, 4 All-Australian captains (McLeod, Muir, Rofe, J.F. Sangster), and the first AAFC Carnival medallist to play for S.A. (Paul Rofe).

== History ==
=== Pre 1906: The birth of the club ===
The Adelaide University Football Club was officially formed on 26 March 1906 and became affiliated with the Sports Association two weeks later on 9 April 1906. Prior to this time, there was no University Football team competing in a regular competition; however, games were arranged on an irregular basis.

The earliest reference to football at the university can be found in the Prince Alfred College School Chronicle of 1885. The report states that Adelaide University could not organize a full side for a Saturday game; however, there were enough players available for a mid-week game. This was arranged for Wednesday 19 June 1885 and several League players and old scholars from PAC comprised the side. University lost this encounter 4.11 to 1.1.

=== 1906-1910: The early years ===
The first team to truly represent the AUFC began competing in the Adelaide and Suburban Association in 1906 with H.W.D. Stoddart as captain and T.H. Donnelly as vice-captain. This Association was already in existence when joined by the "Varsity", and the other five teams competing at the time were Portland Imperial, Semaphore Central, Norwood II, West Suburban and Prospect. University finished out of the four.

During the year a match was also played against Melbourne's Scotch College on Adelaide Oval and the team was defeated 5.8 to 4.9.

During 1907 the club again competed in the Adelaide and Suburban Association, which now consisted of ten teams (West Torrens II, South Adelaide II, North Adelaide II, Sturt II, and West Adelaide were the new sides with West Suburban becoming non-existent). University finished ninth with only one win after ten of the eleven rounds. West Adelaide finished bottom.

In the programme at this time, with one round off for the SA vs Vic. League match, and one round off for the International Lacrosse tournament, which was then a major sport. Finals consisted of the Minor Premiers playing the third side and the second side playing the fourth side. The winners of these games then played to decide the Premiership, with the proviso that if the ultimate winner was not the Minor Premiers, then a final challenge match could be played.

During the three years 1908–1910, the club existed in name only and, except for the annual match against Melbourne University, did not compete at all. This put the club at a disadvantage in these matches as the team was a "scratch" side whilst Melbourne University was admitted to the VFL in 1908 after being Premiers of their Metropolitan Association for the previous two years.

In 1910 Adelaide University made an application to enter the South Australian Football League, the current day SANFL. This led to players such as Jack Londrigan leaving league clubs such as Sturt in anticipation for a university league team. However the application was ultimately rejected by the competition out of fear a university side would compromise the electorate system, also referred to as zones, introduced to equalise the state competition.

Prominent players of this period were H.W.D. Stoddart, P.H. Donnelly. C.E. Dolling, W.A.V. Drew and C.F. Drew.

=== 1911-1915: The birth of the SAAFL ===
1911 is an important date in the club's history as it marked the formation of an active club in distinction to a club which had existed in name only for the previous three seasons. It also marked the formation of the South Australian Amateur Football League with which the name "University" has been synonymous ever since.

Over this five-year period, university won two Premierships (1911, 1912) and competed in the Finals each year. 1915 was highlighted by C.E. Pellew's winning of the Naylor Medal for the fairest and most brilliant player in Amateur League.

1912 saw the formation of the club's first 'B' side, and 1914 saw the inauguration of the Adelaide Students' Football Association in which University was the first Premier. Inter-Varsity competition was continued up until 1915 when it was suspended because of the War, and in 1914 the club defeated Melbourne University for the first time.

=== 1916-1919: World War I ===
Green Ginger Wine
(to the tune of California Here I come)
We're the mighty Uni team
By far the best you've ever seen
With talent, and teamwork, we always combine
And when we, get tired, Sandy gives us ginger wine
But we're the fittest team you know
And Bob Neil is a legend so
Open up those kegs of beer
Cause we'll win the flag this year
The Blacks, the Blacks, the Blacks are fit
The Blacks, the Blacks, the Blacks suck piss!

Adelaide University F.C. song (Audio)

The Amateur League went into recess after 1915 for the duration of the War, as many clubs had difficulty fielding sides. Though short at times, university still had enough players to make up one, and occasionally two, teams during these years.

Matches were arranged on an irregular basis against various teams – mainly school sides. Details of games with PAC and SPSC have been found in the Prince Alfred College Chronicle and the St Peter's College School Magazine, and are certain to be contained in other school magazines.

=== 1920-1929: An era of supremacy ===
The years 1920-1929 can be considered as some of the most successful in the club's history, with the Al team competing in the Finals every year, winning Premierships in 1920, 1921, 1922, 1926 and 1929, finishing runners-up twice and third three times.

During this time the 'B' side also took Premierships in the Adelaide Students' Association in 1920, 1922 and 1924.

The 1922 season was the most successful during this period, with both the 'A' and 'B' sides winning Premierships, the Adelaide side defeating Melbourne in the Inter-Varsity match for only the second time ever, and H.G Prest winning the Naylor Medal.

1923 saw the formation of the club's third side competing in the Students' Grade and although it was not an immediate success, the future strength of the club was assured. Other highlights in this period were the effort of W.R. James to be the first full forward to kick over one hundred goals in Amateur League (1927), the beginning of the Gunning Medal for the 'A' grade best and fairest (1927), the formation of the A2 grade in Amateur League (1928), and the Hone Medal awarded to C.B. Sangster in 1929.

=== 1930-1941: A period of contrast ===
The years 1930-1941 were ones of great contrast for the club. During the early 1930s, the club kept its position as one of the pacesetters in the Amateur League, contesting all the Finals from 1930 to 1935. It was undefeated Premier in 1932, second in 1930, 1933 and 1934 and fourth in 1931 and 1935.

These years are remembered for the club's great rivalry with Underdale, which produced some remarkable Finals matches. The team lost the 1931 semifinal to Underdale; defeated them in the 1932 Final; defeated them in the 1933 Final; drew the challenge match and then lost the challenge replay; defeated them in the 1934 Final but lost the challenge match; and lost to them in the 1935 semifinal. These were truly memorable games.

The club suffered a decline over the years 1936–1940, which climaxed in the Al team almost being relegated in 1939. Fortunately the team rallied in the crucial games and with a little bit of luck was able to finish eighth, which is the lowest position that the Al team has ever occupied. 1941 saw the club improve its standing and, once again, contest the Finals series, finishing fourth.

Despite the lack of success in the local competition, the period 1930-1941 was one of the most successful with regard to Inter-Varsity competition, with matches against Melbourne University being won in 1932 and 1936 – only the third and fourth occasion that these matches had been won in twenty-eight attempts.

The club's 'B' and 'C' sides did not do well during this period as they had the ever-present problem of trying to maintain stable sides. After finishing near the bottom from 1929 to 1932, the A2 side was dropped back to the Students' Association from 1933 to 1937 before competing in A2 again during 1938–1940.

In 1941 there was a shortage of players due to the war, and the club only fielded an Al team in Amateur League and a 'B' side in the Students' Association.

Amateur League matches were suspended after 1941 due to the war.

=== 1942-1945: World War II ===
Because of World War II, the Amateur League went into recess for the years 1942–1945.

Although University ranks were depleted due to war service, there were many fine footballers studying in reserved occupations and still looking for that Saturday game of 'footy'.

A competition evolved on a week to week basis where matches were arranged with Service teams and the League Reserves. Looking at the SANFL records, one can see that in those years the eight League Clubs combined to form Norwood/North, Port/Torrens, Sturt/South and West/Glenelg.

After the League teams had been chosen for Saturday, each combination would nominate six players to constitute the League Reserves for that week, which made the competition almost up to League standard.

"Varsity" played a high percentage of matches against the League Reserves, but players of that era may remember RAAF teams from Port Pine, Mallala, Springbank and the School of Technical Training, (stationed in the old Exhibition Building, North Terrace).

Competition was pretty keen and the Air Force would pull out all stops to win. One memorable event included a train trip to Mallala Base, the hospitality of the RAAF, and experiencing the thrills of a LINK TRAINER at the hands of the opposing team. "Varsity" still took out the honours in the afternoon on the local Mallala Oval.

During the Final Round, "Varsity" often gave a League team match practice whilst having a bye prior to the Grand Final. On the day of the 1944 Preliminary Final, "Varsity" played the Norwood/North combination on Adelaide Oval No. 2. It was a very close game, "Varsity" was proud of their narrow defeat as Norwood/North went on to win the Grand Final the following week.

Old players on leave from the Services were always welcome for a game, Norm Shierlaw and Peter Dalwood once displayed their former skills by playing without training, and in Army boots.

Maybe it was only a makeshift competition, but it definitely kept the game alive and fulfilled the aims and objects of the AUFC at the university during those years when the club could easily have gone into recess, as did the other Amateur Clubs.

=== 1946-1949: Postwar recovery ===
The SAAFL had ceased to run a regular competition from 1942 to 1945 due to World War II. In 1946, when life was returning to normal again, the Amateur League recommenced its competition with two grades, Al and A2. The club was represented in both these grades and performed quite well in the years immediately after the War. Although Premierships eluded 'the Blacks' in these years, the Al side played in the Finals in all but one season and was most unfortunate to be disqualified in 1947 when a Premiership looked a possibility.

On the administrative side, 1949 saw the retirement of Dr. N.S. Gunning from the club presidency after a long association with the club that dated back to the early 1920s. His place was taken by Dr. C.B. Sangster who had been an outstanding player with the club in the late 1920s and early 1930s.

On the playing side, H. Page returned to the club as coach on the path to a most successful era in the 1950s. A.G.A. Tregonning, winner of the Gunning Medal in 1944 and 1946, captained the club in 1947 and 1948 and also led the State Amateur side in 1947, 1948 and 1949. In 1948 the state side won the Amateur Carnival for the first time with H. Page as coach and a strong university representation.

This period represented an era of consolidation for the club and, although Premierships were not won, there was a building up of club strength that was to show itself in the 1950s.

=== 1950-1959: A dominant era ===
Although the post-War years had been reasonably successful, there had not been an Al Premiership. In fact the last time 'the Blacks' had won the Flag was back in 1932. This situation soon changed and the 1950s saw the club return to a position of power in Amateur League.

E.G. Tilley replaced H. Page as coach in 1950 and continued on the improvement shown by the club in the years following the Second World War. During his six years at the club, the Al side played in six Grand Finals, winning four Flags. These were the results that the club had attained in the 1920s and early 1930s.

L.G. (Jack) Giles took over the coaching duties from E.G. Tilley in 1957 and was in charge until the end of the 1959 season. The club enjoyed reasonably successful seasons under him but did not take off a Premiership.

There were many very good players of this era and the representatives the club had in All-Australian Amateur teams fit into this category. J.K.A. McLeod (1950 and captain in 1954), D.M. Brebner (1950), J.F. Walsh (1954) and B.M. Seppelt (1958) were all magnificent players for the club. The number of state players the club provided during this time was also very high (seven on average) and E.G. Tilley coached the State Amateurs from 1951 to 1956, after taking over the job from H. Page.

The club had expanded and at stages fielded five teams although at this time the Amateur League only had five grades. Teams were fielded in the Students' Association and the Sturt District Association and both these sides met with success. The feats of J.C. Liii in this latter association are worth noting. After winning the club's Best and Fairest in the fifth side in 1955, he won both the club's Award and the Association Medal in 1956 when this team was the fourth fielded by university. The following two seasons, 1957 and 1958, he won the Gunning Medal for the Al side.

On the administrative side, Dr. C.B. Sangster served as president from 1949 to 1953 and was succeeded by Dr. R.T. Steele, former captain of the club. He served until 1959 in this capacity. Constitutional changes saw the new category of Honorary Life Membership introduced in 1952 and two worthy recipients, Dr. N.S. Gunning and Dr. C.B. Sangster, were the first to be accorded this honour. Further men who received this honour in the 1950s were H. Page and H. ('Longun') Wilson (1953), H.V. Millard (1954), and J.K.A. McLeod (1957). All these men were very worthy recipients of this honour.

It was a sad moment for the club when 'Longun' Wilson died in 1956. He had been a significant part of 'the Blacks' since 1928 and his presence as a trainer was missed.

This was a very successful era for 'the Blacks' with the Al's dominating the top grade and the lower sides increasing in strength as the decade progressed.

=== 1960-1969: The golden years ===
Although the club had enjoyed a particularly successful era in the 1950s in which it played in seven Al Grand Finals and won four Premierships, even greater success was to come in the 1960s. Dr. R.T. Steele ended a six-year term as president and a twenty-year active association with the club as a player and administrator when he stepped down as president at the beginning of the 1960 season. His place was taken by another stalwart of the club in J.B. Day who remained as president throughout the 1960s.

Constitutional changes in the mid-1960s saw Sir George Ligertwood become Patron in 1966 and another long serving stalwart R.L. Whittle take the position of chairman in 1967.

An important appointment on the playing side was that of Alan Greer to the senior coaching position in 1960. His record as a player with Port Adelaide and the state side was very impressive and he had coached Riverside in Amateur League during the late 1950s. In his eight years with the club, he took the Al side into the Grand Final each year and won four Premierships. This record surpassed the performance of E.G. Tilley who took the Al side into six Grand Finals for four Premierships in his six years with the club in the 1950s.

The sides of the early 1960s were considered by many people to be the finest that the club has fielded. Many of the players represented the State Amateur side and many progressed to League football where they played with distinction. A.R. Clarkson, D.C. Hill, W.R Jackson, M.E. Jones and A.E. Byers are examples of players in this category.

The middle 1960s continued the fine performances of earlier years. However, Premierships eluded the club with the exception of 1965. W.R. Haslam, J.F. Sangster (an All Australian captain), J.R. Blake, I.F. Edgely and C.H.A. Meyer were some of the brilliant players of this era.

The late 1960s also saw the club in a pre-eminent position in Amateur League as a new generation of university players carried the club to Premierships in 1968 and 1969 under coaches D.F. Kimber and P. Vivian. This period saw outstanding players such as V.J. Bondar, B.R. Simmons, J.H.P. Disney, J.R. Goodhart, P.J.L. Rofe and J.S. Sandland wearing 'the Blacks' jumper.

Thus the club played in every Al Grand Final in the 1960s, winning six Premierships. This was an enviable record and a performance unsurpassed in Amateur League history.

As well as the outstanding record of the Al's during this period, the remainder of the club also had its share of success. This can be attributed in part to Alan Greer who generated great club spirit by insisting that all teams train together. G.O’H. Hyde led the A3 team to a Flag in 1965 (undefeated Premiers), the Al reserves were runners-up in 1964 with J.G. Olliver in charge, and won the Premiership in 1965 under the leadership of G. Kraehe. K. Allen led the A2 Reserves to a Flag in 1961. D.R. Harrison coached the A3 reserves to Grand Finals in 1964 and 1965, winning the 1964 Premiership.

The 1960s saw the club expand into the largest football club in Australia, a fact of which the club is very proud. It is no wonder that this era is looked upon as the Golden Era of the club's history.

=== 1970-1979: A decade of challenges ===
After the heady successes of the 1960s, when the club competed in all ten grand finals, expectations of club performance had risen to new levels. Whatever followed in the ensuing years would be compared with the 'good old days', and anything short of dominance of the A1 competition and successful competition in the lower grades was likely to fall short of those standards.

However, the 1970s started in excellent fashion with the A1 side carrying all before it prior to the May vacation in 1970. With the Inter-Varsity team in Melbourne for the carnival, and hence missing a full round of matches, it was decided to play Flinders University at University Oval in the week prior to Inter-Varsity in A1 and A1 Reserves. One player who was a reserve for the A1 side in this mid-week game also played against SPOC in A2 on the following Saturday, thus effectively playing for the A1s and A2s at the same time.

An oversight certainly, and a foolish one at that, but the reaction of the Amateur League was astonishing. In a decision of incredible severity, the club lost all premiership points in every grade up to that point of the season. This, of course, left all sides in bottom position after eight games. The effect on the club was marked, as can be expected, and certainly had repercussions that season and in 1971. It was a credit to the character of the club, the A1 coach and A1 team that the performances for the 1970 season were even better than the high standards set by the club in the previous few seasons. The side was undefeated at the time of the Inter-Varsity, lost the next game and then remained undefeated until the second last minor round game when a loss to Postal Institute cost the team a place in the finals.

In the next three years, 1971–1973, the A1 side performed solidly but not spectacularly, and the prime goal of premierships eluded the side. Indeed, the side missed the four in 1972 for the first time since World War II (1970 being discounted), despite a fine finish to the season. The only premiership in the club during these years was a 1972 victory in the A4 Reserves, led by G.C. Harcourt and R. Hunter.

Four years had passed without an A1 premiership when K.R. Griffiths was appointed coach in 1974. The district clubs of the Amateur League were making their presence felt more strongly, and the domination of student sides evident in the 1960s was waning.

1974 saw an influx of experienced players to the Blacks from league clubs, other Amateur clubs and interstate. Indeed, four players new to the club won All Australian selection in 1974 (K.R. Griffiths, S. Johnson, B. Ferris and S.T.P. Trumble), and a further two players who also joined in this year became All-Australian players after the 1976 carnival (M. Schwartz and M. Kerr-Grant).

The three years that K.R. Griffiths coached the club saw the A1 side take out two premierships (1974 and 1975) and finish runners-up in 1976. This was a return to the dominance of the A1 competition that the club had enjoyed in the fifties and sixties.

The club had rationalized the number of teams back to six following several years in the late fifties and early sixties when eight were fielded. At this stage old scholars' clubs were gaining in strength, and the trend affected the club's recruiting for the lower grades. It was also at this time that a decision was made to stabilise the movement of players through the club by placing 'core players' in each side. This concept involved the naming of ten to twelve players in each of the lower sides who remained the backbone of that side. Any promotions or demotions took place with the other members of the team (there were exceptions to this rule).

This stabilised the lower sides (A3 Reserves and below) and helped the coaches and captains develop a team spirit and identity which had been lacking before. Generally, the idea was successful, as team performances improved and everyone in the club had a side with which he could identify. In past seasons up to one hundred players could pass through the sides in A3 and below.

Teams led by T. Nagel (comprising Adelaide University baseballers and cricketers) and R. Forbes played off in the 1975 preliminary final in A8. This was to be the beginning of a strong lower grade contingent comprising players like R. Neil, G. Bellchamber, J. Green, A. Nurk and G. de Boer who enjoyed considerable success in A8. They won premierships in 1978 and 1980 and two of their players, J. Green and W. Sarre, won Amateur League medals.

G.C. Harcourt and N.C. Beagley also had similar groups of players who played over a period and identified strongly with the A3 Reserves.

The late seventies saw an increased professionalism come into the game, and the problems of a truly amateur club competing for players became difficult. Players no longer played for University for a couple of years and then tried their hand at league football as had happened in the past. Country players began to return home on weekends, lured by the promise of 'expenses', while district clubs and SAFA clubs boasted about facilities and incentives to lure the young away from the Blacks.

The club reacted to these changes through very active recruiting campaigns on campus and amongst the schools, and by playing a higher percentage of graduate players than in the past. With the absence of Inter-Varsities from the football program, the club initiated pre-season trips to Melbourne (1980) and Loxton (1981) to in some way replace these games. This was done with the ultimate hope of revitalising Inter-Varsity.

=== 1980-1989: Resurgence of the lower grades ===
The 1980s began with the Adelaide University Football Club not having won an A1 grand final since 1975. The Blacks had made appearances in every major round since that time except for 1977, not counting the controversial 1970 season. To rectify this situation, the 1980 pre-season saw the continuation of a vigorous recruiting policy on campus, and extended to uni students not playing for the Blacks. This pro-active approach had been started in the late 1970s and was essential in the competition for talented players.

The results of this policy slowly manifested itself in the overall performances of the club. In 1980 all six sides had a chance to reach the four with one minor round game remaining. Four sides ended up in the finals, and two premierships resulted - A1 Reserves and A8.

The enthusiasm generated in the last few seasons of the previous decade had been very high. This led to the formation of a G grade or seventh side. Registrations were now approaching the levels of the late 1960s and the early 1970s, when eight teams were fielded at the height of the club's strength. This improvement in numbers and atmosphere at the club was attributed to many factors. That the club now had a larger pool of willing administrators than had been the case for quite some time, the policy of pre-season trips to replace the Inter-Varsity competitions had proved very popular, and the upgrading of facilities at University Oval, despite a cutback in financial support from the Sports Association, all contributed.

The return to the club in 1980 of Dr F.A. (Fred) Bloch as senior coach and P.J.L. (Paul) Rofe as football director, along with the increased support of past players, was also an important aspect of this revival. Fred's return, in particular, was pivotal in ensuring the successes that the Blacks were to achieve in the next 25 years.

From 1982, the teaming of 'Chocka' Bloch and Michael Weatherald influenced the club significantly. More structured recognition of team and player performances through milestone photographs, team photographs, 'the Weathers' Keg' and the 'Long'un' Wilson Trophy, ensured more stability in the lower grades' coaching staff and players.

In addition, the advent of Hold Your Bowlies - the weekly club gathering to read the scores and make a nominated skuller drink far too much beer - and increased sponsorship and involvement of past players established sound foundations that have been built on and are in evidence today.

Success was not instantaneous - it took some time for these positive initiatives to manifest themselves on the scoreboard. The 1985 season saw no side finish above fourth, although a second-place finish in the Norwich Life Cup was an indication of improvement in both depth of talent and performances across the club.

Player strength was bolstered in 1986 by the arrival of talented players from Adelaide College, who had folded as a club that year. John Griffen's influence in 1986 and 1987 was significant, with the 1986 A1 premiership providing the fillip that the management committee and club players and supporters were seeking.

At least five sides competed in the finals for the rest of the decade - a great achievement that restored the Blacks to a position of strength in the Amateur League.

In 1988 the top four sides had to move to Park 10 whilst a new cricket pitch was installed at beautiful University Oval. This 'hip-and-shouldered' the remaining lower grade sides north to Park 9 - the former Teachers' College Oval.

The decade saw the resurgence of the lower grades with 11 lower grade premierships and 14 medallists. Indeed, the 1988 season saw Blacks' players awarded five Amateur League medals.

More importantly, the ten-year drought in A1 grade premierships was broken in 1986.

=== 1990-1999: A great end to the century ===
During the early years of the 1990s, the veiled threat of relegation hung over the A1 side - a situation the club was far from used to. The primary reason for this was a larger-than-normal turnover of experienced players in the higher grades. This in turn was influenced in part by the depressed South Australian economy forcing many potential players to move interstate or overseas to find employment or seek monetary rewards at other clubs.

Despite these challenges, the club managed to play finals football in all but three years during this period. As the decade progressed, a more stable player base developed and the club was rewarded with A grade premierships in 1996, under the guidance of co-coaches Terry McEvoy and Noel Annear, and in 1999, with Peter Simmons at the helm.

During the 1990s, the Blacks had five senior coaches (John Turnbull, Daryl West, Terry McEvoy/Noel Annear and Peter Simmons).

The longest tenure was by the popular D.K. (Daryl) West who coached from 1991 to 1995 during one of the club's most challenging times. Daryl was a significant contributor to the club in terms of developing the talent from within and embracing the Blacks' spirit and culture.

Cory Williams captained the club until the early part of the 1993 season, when he suffered a career ending knee injury. Cory was replaced by Andrew 'Dog' Muir, who went on to lead the Blacks with distinction and courage for the next five seasons and was rewarded with the leading the side to the 1996 premiership in his tenth season with the club.

Many club players represented the state during the 1990s, including outstanding players A.D. (Andrew) Muir, G.R. (Grant) Miles, S.R. (Simon) Kewell and J.J. (Jamie) Sibbick. Andrew Muir was also rewarded with selection in the All-Australian team on two occasions and was captain in 1991 and vice-captain in 1994.

On the administrative side, in 1991 the club said farewell to then-chairman P.H. (Peter) Maddern, who went to the US to pursue his academic studies. Peter was welcomed back as president in 1996, a position that he has held right through to the time of writing.

On his return, Peter found a radical change had taken place in the Amateur League competition, with the establishment of the semi-professional Premier 1 division. The Blacks promptly showed you don't need money to win premierships by taking out the inaugural Premier 1 flag.

Patrons during this period included Professors K.M. (Kevin) Majoribanks, Gavin Brown and W.F. (Bill) Scammell.

During the 1990s, the club mourned the loss of a number of club legends. These included Dr J.B. Day, president of the club during the golden era of the 1960s, in 1990, long time trainer, Frank ('Sandy') Cockburn, who had been at the club since 1979, in 1994, and finally, Mark Schwartz, a life member and president during the period 1985 to 1995, in 1999.

In the lower grades, the club had unprecedented success during the 1990s, with 16 premierships won. This included a record breaking five flags in the 1997 season.

Off the field, the club had two Rhodes Scholars in S.R. (Sam) Nickless in 1992 and A.P. (Anthony) Roediger in 1996.

Bob Neil fever remained as strong as ever, with songbooks, badges and merchandise, as well as the occasional guest appearance and keg-tapping demonstration by the legend himself at Hold Your Bowlies.

By the end of the 1990s, the Blacks were in great shape, having addressed a myriad of challenges. The club was primed to tackle the new century with great confidence.

=== Post 2000: Y2K and beyond ===
Since the technophobic (remember that bug?) ushering in of the new millennium, the AUFC has enjoyed the normal delights and frustrations of suburban football in Adelaide: some A-Grade glory and plenty of special lower grade tomfoolery. Andrew 'Dog' Muir made it to 300 games and retirement while Darren 'The Jerk' Graetz made it to 400 games, well beyond 1,000 goals and waddled on to the SAAFL goal-kicking record before (perhaps) calling it a day. The historic Park 10 change rooms and grandstand did what all rich old ladies do these days - got a full body makeover. The As ploughed through coaches, lower grade coach Richard Foster cranked out a long series of Premierships with his splendid old'n'new mix, while coaches such as Anthony 'Dima' Dimarzo and 'Dirty' Darien O'Reilly entrenched themselves into Uni folklore.

The Bob Neil factor maintained a constant level of satisfaction for the players. With the actual man spending a little less time at the lower grades he started to take on a mythical element especially to the freshman who had never laid eyes on him. Naturally this only fuelled the legend. Perhaps it could be argued that a few more premierships might have given the recent history a shinier look but most players and supporters have memories based on the people not their position.

== Bob Neil - The legend ==
Bob Neil is an enigma. Much is known about him, but few could tell you what he looks like, or how to find him. Many have tried and failed - his fans have carried banners emblazoned with his name to major sporting events in Australia and around the world, from Adelaide Oval to the MCG, from Lord's to Trinidad.

Bob Neil
- Born: Adelaide
- Education: Prince Alfred College; University of Adelaide
- Scientific career
- Fields: Bachelor of Science
Australian rules football career
Personal information
- Full name: Robert H. Neil
- Original team: Adelaide University
- Position: Club Legend
- Other occupation: Mathematician
Playing career
Years	Club	Games (Goals)
1974-1993	Adelaide University	236

They have paged him in the hopes of drawing him out into the open, just so they can catch a glimpse of their legendary hero. "Dr Bob Neil... paging Dr Bob Neil" - it's a familiar sound heard over the loudspeakers of many a sporting venue. But no one ever answers the call; so far Bob Neil

The legend of Bob Neil first grew to prominence among members of the Adelaide Uni Football Club. Bob Neil started as a player with the Blacks in the 1970s, later becoming a coach and committee member. His good deeds were known far and wide-appearing out of nowhere to help tap a beer keg at a party (a difficult task when there's no experienced bar staff around) or filling in for a player or an umpire at short notice.

But it was during the SAAFL 1986 Division A1 Grand Final that his name first achieved legend status, when a chant of "Bob Neil, Bob Neil", was used to spur the Blacks on to victory. Soon his name began appearing all over Adelaide-in graffiti, on banners, and over the loudspeakers at Adelaide Oval. When a Bob Neil banner was spotted at an Aussie Rules match at The Oval, London, he had ceased being a cult figure and had transformed into a phenomenon. His name even appeared on the Berlin Wall just before it was demolished in 1990.

These days Bob Neil is known as the only man in Adelaide who gets away with wearing grey shorts during the footy season (so that he doesn't need to change between black for home games, or white for away). He bears the number 130 on his football jersey, which is the only three-digit number worn by a player-a device used to teach his opponents skills in mathematics as well as football.

Indeed, there's more to the man than just football. A brilliant mathematician, Bob Neil reportedly works for the Defence Department out of a secret bunker north of Adelaide, protecting Australia from invasion by solving simultaneous mathematical equations. His own equations on the meaning of life, death and beer have revolutionised both mathematical and philosophical thinking.

Bob Neil is a hero to the common man. A member of the Greys (a select group of former Blacks players who know the real Bob Neil and who help protect his true identity from being exposed), Dr Bloch is to Bob Neil what Commissioner Gordon is to Batman.

When there's only done in the most extreme occasions-like if the umpire hasn't turned up at a footy match and we need someone to fill in. Bob might have some important fourteenth line of an equation to solve, some huge problem of Australia's defence, but I'll ring him and say 'We haven't got an umpire! and then he just drops everything. or if a first-year player has forgotten his jersey, that's a classic one. Then Bob will come and lend him the 130.

We get calls from people all the time to hand over his number so they can ring Bob in his bunker out there in Salisbury, but we can't do that. Bob's a very busy man. If he was upfront and made himself available it might get unbearable, so he's gotta take a back seat and be a very secretive figure. Otherwise the demand on his time would be enormous. So for that reason I'm afraid Bob will have to remain a mystery."

A portrait of Bob Neil was entered in the 2002 Archibald Prize by artist Rebecca Hunt. Her inspiration to paint him came from the fact that nobody had seen him before.

== Hall of Fame ==
Dr Fred Bloch OAM
- Born: Frederick Archibald Bloch; March 24, 1940
- Died: 23 July 2023 (aged 83); Adelaide, South Australia
- Education: Adelaide Boys High School; University of Adelaide
- Occupations: Head of the School of Commerce; University Lecturer
- Years active: 1968 - 2011
- Organisation: University of Adelaide
Australian rules football career
Personal information
- Nickname: Chocka
- Original team: Berri
- Height: 177 cm (5 ft 10 in)
- Weight: 79 kg (174 lb)
- Position: Centre
Playing career
Years	Club	Games (Goals)
1961-1967	North Adelaide	77 (17)

=== Dr Norm Gunning ===
Dr Gunning commenced at the Blacks in 1922. An outstanding player, either at full forward or full back, he played Intervarsity football throughout his Blacks' playing career (1922-1926), was vice-captain of the club in 1926, represented the State in the inaugural state amateur game in 1925, and again in 1926, and received a Blue in 1923 followed by an Australian 'Blue' in 1926.

Dr Gunning served as club secretary in 1923 and 1924, followed by president from 1937 until 1946. He was an inaugural inductee to life membership at the Blacks in 1952 and his name is ascribed to the A grade best and fairest medal.

=== Dr Fred Bloch ===
Dr Fred Bloch OAM ("Chocka") was an outstanding footballer. Having been recruited from Berri, he made his debut for North Adelaide in 1961 and in 1965 he was North Adelaide's best and fairest. He represented South Australia during the 60s. He was a star in a North Adelaide team that included the incomparable Barry Robran.

Fred was the A2 coach at university from 1968 to 1971, taking over the A1 coaching role in 1980. In 1982 he assumed an administrative role at the Blacks that took various forms over the years including secretary, keeper of records, author of annual reports, recruitment officer and ultimately 'football director'. He was the Head of Commerce and a lecturer at the University of Adelaide, often slipping Blacks references into his accounting lectures and exams.

He was awarded an Order of Australia in 1999 for "service to youth and Australian Rules Football through the Adelaide University Football Club".

=== Peter Maddern ===
Peter Maddern ("Young", "Wide") commenced as a player in 1980. He played around 150 games in reputedly 'wide' fashion, and kicked over 200 goals. He was a successful coach of the 'Glamour Side'. In 1988 he became chairman for a number of years. In 1996 he became president and held that position continuously until his retirement in 2012; 16 consecutive years – a club record by a long way. During the term of his presidency the club won no fewer than 28 premierships including a glorious record 5 in 1997 on 'Super Saturday'. The A grade was the dominant division 1 team through the period 1996–2002, playing in four grand finals and winning two.

He has served over the years as tribunal advocate, club spokesman, member of the SAAFL executive, charismatic and eloquent 'Hold Your Bowlies' host, and much more. Peter was inducted as a life member in 1998.

=== Dr Chris Sangster ===
Awarded a full Blue in 1927 for football.

== Honour boards ==
=== Life members ===
Life member	Name	Hall of Fame	Full Blue	Half Blue	Letters	Games
1952	Dr C.B. Sangster	2013	1927			
1952	Dr N.S. Gunning	2012				
1953	H. Wilson					
1953	H. Page					
1954	H.V. Millard					
1957	J.K.A. McLeod					
1960	Dr R.T. Steele					
1960	J.W. Downer					
1965	R.L. Whittle					
1965	J.B. Day					
1966	Dr G.O'H. Hyde					216
1968	A.J. Greer					
1977	Sir G.M. Badger					
1979	R.G. Gask					
1981	Prof G.C. Harcourt					210
1981	P.J.L. Rofe					224
1983	Dr N.C. Beagley					220
1983	Dr R.K. Penhall					222
1984	D.N. Bartlett					315
1986	E.P. Olekalns					259
1987	F. Cockburn				1985	
1988	F.A. Bloch	2012				
1991	M. Schwartz					
1994	J.A. Homburg					
1998	P.H. Maddern	2013				
2001	M.S. Ashwood					
2002	R.J. Maloney					
2005	M.J. Bird					
2012	T.J. Bernard					
2012	S.W. Bridgwood					
2012	C.J. Bryson					
2012	G.J. Burton					
2012	B. Champion					
2012	T.M. Charlton					
2012	M.J. Chase					
2012	S.M. Clark					
2012	M. Danielak					
2012	J.A. Deboer					
2012	B.W. Eckert					
2012	G.G. Fairbrother					
2012	C.M. Fanning					
2012	J.L. Filmer					
2012	R.W. Foster					
2012	D.K.E. Greatz					
2012	D.W. Hancock					
2012	D.M. Harrison					
2012	A.R. Howard					
2012	M.D. Kenny					
2012	S.D. Kimber					
2012	W.L. King					
2012	W.L. Legrand					
2012	R.R. Martin					
2012	A.D. Muir					
2012	R.H. Neil					236
2012	P.S. O'Leary					
2012	A.J. Parker					
2012	A.G. Puddy					
2012	J.M. Richardson					
2012	B.M. Rigden					
2012	S. Ritchie					
2012	C.K. Rule					
2012	M.C. Schapel					
2012	W.J. Scott-Young					
2012	A.G. Stanley					
2012	A.J. Stenhouse					
2012	C.S. Uppington					
2012	B.T. Vezis					
2012	N.A. Vezis					
2012	P.J. Wildy					
2013	D.F. Adams					
2013	E.R. Ashwood					
2013	A.A. Cavuoto					
2013	M.J. Dadds					
2013	A.R. Dimarzo					
2013	P.B. Drew					
2013	N.D. Gallarello					
2013	D.M. Gordon					
2013	J.J. Kernahan					
2013	A.J. Lamb					
2013	A.M. Leunig					
2013	T.P. Martin					
2013	M.A. Mayes					
2013	W.R.B. Mcleay					
2013	R.J. Miles					
2013	A. Nurk				1984	
2013	D.J. O’Reilly					
2013	P. Rhigas					
2013	A.C. Sprague					
2013	S.J. Uppington					

SAAFL player life members
R.J. Bradshaw	R.R. Martin	A.G. Puddy
A.M. Brewer	R.V. McMahon	D.J. Wardleworth
J.H Duffy	R.D. Perkins	J.K. Wellington
R.J. Hearn	D.H. Proudman	

=== Colours ===
The different standards for a Blue, Half Blue and Club Letters (Service and Competition) are set by each club and then approved by the University Blues Committee.

A "Blue" is the highest sporting distinction conferred by the association, which can be awarded to a student of the University of Adelaide who is a member of AU Sport. It is awarded in recognition of outstanding ability in a particular sport.

A "Half Blue" is the second highest sporting distinction conferred by the association to a student of the University of Adelaide and is a recognition of ability in a particular sport, which is not sufficient to entitle persons an award of a Blue.

"Club Letters" may be awarded either:

- as the third highest sporting distinction conferred by the association, in which case it shall, except in special cases, be awarded to a person who throughout such period as the association considers sufficient in the circumstances, has, either taken part regularly and consistently well in local competition or who has taken part well in Inter-varsity competition or Australian Universities Games and/or Championships, or
- as an acknowledgment of the rendering of conscientious service by a person to such person's club, and has satisfied the guidelines of such person's club for the award of Club Letters.

The following have been awarded a Blue, Half-Blue or Club Letters by the University for Football. List as at 2016.

Year	Blue	Half-Blue	Club Letters
1908	EB Jones		
1908	HWD Stoddart		
1908	SGL Catchgrove		
1908	SW Jeffries		
1908	TH Donnelly		
1909	CF Drew		
1909	DRW Cowan		
1909	LH Haslam		
1909	WAV Drew		
1910	FN Messurier		
1910	JW Londrigan		
1910	KN Steele		
1910	LA Hayward		
1910	LW Davies		
1910	OJ Murphy		
1911	AC Wilton		
1911	FE Williams		
1911	WW Cooper		
1912	JW Blacket		
1912	LJB Hurley		
1912	R Badger		
1913	AE Williams		
1913	AH Limb		
1914	CE Pellew		
1914	CR Cole		
1914	DM Steele		
1914	L Carthew		
1914	LG Holmes		
1914	NV Mengerson		
1914	TBC Sard		
1915	C Gurner		
1915	WJE Phillips		
1919	AH White		
1919	ATB Jones		
1919	CI Streich		
1919	DJR Sumner		
1919	EJK Harbison		
1919	HG Prest		
1919	TW Tassie		
1920	EH Johncock		
1920	GH Jeffrey		
1920	GM Hone		
1920	TD Finey		
1920	WMC Symonds		
1921	CE Willing		
1921	HL Davie		
1921	IC Barton		
1921	RO Fox		
1921	WRG Colman		
1922	ASD Cocks		
1922	DLR Boucaut		
1923	FH Fischer		
1923	JF Koerner		
1923	NS Gunning		
1924	GA Cain		
1924	KMC'Q Bennett		
1924	NA Walsh		
1925	DG Mckay		
1925	LS Walsh		
1925	SH Lewis		
1926	BS Hanson		
1926	WR James		
1927	CB Sangster		
1927	LN Allen		
1927	MW Evans		
1927	NH Stuart		
1927	WR Baker		
1928	FH Finlayson		
1928	RF Booker		
1928	S Williams		
1929	AJ Clarkson		
1929	AO Mcpherson		
1929	BW Hone		
1929	DL Richards		
1929	DT Mitchell		
1929	EA Schulz		
1929	HL Abbott		
1930	JMJ Jens		
1930	WH Baudinet		
1931	CK James		
1931	DF Burnard		
1931	IH Seppelt		
1931	RH Elix		
1932	AG Gillespie		
1932	HM Thompson		
1932	JF Funder		
1932	MM Playford		
1932	RL Muecke		
1932	RV Mcmichael		
1932	WL Hann		
1933	JP Mcfarlane		
1933	NJ Mcbain		
1933	RP Larkin		
1933	WCJ White		
1934	GD Dawson		
1934	JW Sangster		
1934	KH South		
1934	R Anders		
1934	RF Brown		
1934	W Bentley		
1935	CC Kuchell		
1936	JJ Rice		
1936	P Kleinschmidt		
1938	AP Lemessurier		DC Dawkins
1938	BA Magarey		
1938	DC Dawkins		
1938	HL Masters		
1939	RT Steele		
1939	WJ Betts		
1940	JE Dunstan		JG Shierlaw
1940	NC Ligertwood		JS Skipper
1940			MJ O'Grady
1940			NC Shierlaw
1940			NG Abbott
1940			RW Oliver
1940			VW Mansell
1941			B McMichael
1941			G Brookman
1941			IM Disher
1941			J Ryan
1941			PA Dalwood
1941			RG White
1941			RM Holmes
1941			WW Solly
1942			C Anderson
1942			GE Wall
1942			GF Cheesman
1942			HM Douglas
1942			JB Day
1943			BH Coulls
1943			DE Woodard
1943			DL Davies
1943			DM Eldridge
1943			JP Keeves
1943			NG Hosking
1943			RA Russell
1944			B Basedow
1944			CC Dewar
1944			DAL Abbott
1944			DG Stalley
1944			DN Robinson
1944			JC Bundey
1944			K Rilstone
1944			TB Cullity
1945			BR Goode
1945			JL Whittle
1945			R Cowper
1945			T Judell
1946	AGA Tregonning		DL Davies
1946	BH Coulls		FC Bennett
1946	BR Goode		GME Mayo
1946	CE Dewar		GRE Vernon
1946	DL Davies		KT O'Loughlin
1947	DAD Abbott		CF Robertson
1947	DM Brebner		D Brebner
1947	DN Robinson		DI Harris
1947	RM Holmes		P Butterworth
1947			RM Duffy
1948	OG Woodward		AL Dowding
1948			BJ Michelmore
1948			MR Basheer
1948			OG Woodward
1948			RL Elix
1949	AL Dowding		BJ Downing
1949	BJ Michelmore		JRN Twopenny
1949	MR Basheer		KR Seedsman
1949	RG White		RS Bungey
1950	JF Walsh		IN Broadbent
1950	KR Seedsman		J Walsh
1950	RL Elix		JKA McLeod
1950			M Lyon
1950			RC Bennett
1950			RJ Lawrence
1951	CF Robertson		DH Giles
1951	DI Harris		JB Laurie
1951	IN Broadbent		JR Lawrence
1951	JKA Mcleod		MJ Kitchener
1951			RR Hancock
1951			WR Quintrell
1952	DH Giles		GJ Duncan
1952	PB Tunbridge		JG Martin
1952	RJ Lawrence		KD Fitch
1952			PB Tunbridge
1953	GJ Duncan		R Koehne
1953	JB Laurie		RN Tuckwell
1953	JG Martin		
1953	MJ Kitchener		
1953	RC Bennett		
1953	RR Hancock		
1954	DS Muecke		C Akkermans
1954	GE Krieger		CS Bungey
1954	KD Fitch		DS Muecke
1954	RG Johnson		GE Krieger
1954	RH Tuckewell		JG Clayton
1954			JW Downer
1954			PG Pak-Poy
1954			RG Johnson
1954			RW Lawsmith
1954			TAS Hanson
1955	CHFX Akkermans		CL Ketley
1955	CL Ketley		FW Altmann
1955	CS Bungey		GP Wilson
1955	JG Clayton		J Mestrov
1955	PG Poy		JB Edwards
1955	WJ Downer		JN Bishop
1955			NR Crowe
1955			R Greet
1955			RL Whittle
1956	GP Wilson		G.O'H. Hyde
1956	JP Edwards		TM McAuliffe
1956	TM McAuliffe		
1957	FW Altmann		BH Kidd
1957	GO'H Hyde		DJ Watson
1957	TAS Hanson		JC Lill
1957			JLC Wigan
1957			MC Rice
1958	JC Lill		BM Seppelt
1958	RG Strickland		D Liljegren
1958	TJ Mestrov		JH Alpers
1958	WA Seppelt		JP Rice
1958			MG Montgomery
1958			RD Terrell
1958			RG Strickland
1959	MG Montgomery		AR Clarkson
1959	MH Codd		JH Patterson
1959			JRE Wells
1960	AR Clarkson		CHA Meyer
1960	CHA Meyer		GG Spurling
1960	JRE Wells		JC Ferguson
1960			KC Kelly
1961	AD Shepherd	AD Byers	A Ravesi
1961	DC Hill	JC Ferguson	DJ Porter
1961	JF Hooper	JF Sangster	R Dickson
1961	KC Kelly		RG Todd
1961	PG Morton		
1962	AE Byers	A Pryor	AJ Laslett
1962	JC Ferguson	DJ Gambling	J Corbett
1962	JF Sangster	J Pfitzner	JG Oliver
1962	R Todd	NA Mcnicol	LL Morris
1962			PL Rogers
1962			WR Jackson
1963	A Pryor	I Milne	D Harrison
1963	DJ Gambling	LL Morris	T Stafford
1963	G Seppelt	O Petrucco	
1963	JV Corbett		
1963	M Jones		
1963	P Clark		
1963	WR Jackson		
1964	WS Chapman	DR David	AJ Mcmichael
1964		RW Haslam	DJ Dall
1964			GJ Kraehe
1964			IF Edgley
1964			PJ Salkeld
1965	DJ David	IF Edgley	RI Warhurst
1965	I Robertson	PR Lehman	
1965	WR Haslam		
1966	GL Muecke	DJ Coombe	DT Parkin
1966	IF Edgley	JR Blake	I Grierson
1966	J Clapp		MC Baily
1966	J Gregerson		R Waltham
1966	J Woodburn		RD Waltham
1966	M Jay		S Mckee
1966	RH Muecke		VJ Bondar
1967	IG Hockridge	BR Simmons	IR Jonasson
1967	JR Blake	JHP Disney	JR Turnbull
1967	RD Waltham	VJ Bondar	
1968	I Grierson	G Stirling	A Sangster
1968	J Goodhart	J Sandland	B Hunt
1968	JHP Disney	R Gask	F Bloch
1968	P Rofe		N Beagley
1968	VJ Bondar		R Underdown
1968			T O'Malley
1969	B Hunt	A Sangster	B Jenkins
1969	GD Debelle	J McFarlane	G Harcourt
1969	J Sandland	NC Beagley	J McMurtrie
1969			M Croucher
1969			R Aistrope
1969			R Hunter
1970	JD McFarlane	J Katsaros	D Day
1970	L Mitchell		G Illman
1970			I Haines
1970			PJ Bruce
1971	J Katsaros	B Emmett	O Keen
1971		F Morgan	
1972	B Emmett	P Holbrook	
1972		W Gould	
1973		R Harley	D Bartlett
1973			M Armitage
1973			P White
1974	B Ferris	B Dare	E Olekalns
1974	K Griffiths	D Bartlett	G Lawrence
1974	S Johnson	D Bradshaw	
1974		M Schwartz	
1975	E Olekalns	J Parker	B Webber
1975	M Kerr-Grant	M Fanning	H McGrath
1975		M Teubner	J Parker
1976	M Teubner	B Webber	A Hinchcliff
1976		J Parker	
1977		S Skov	
1980	M Wellington	J Duffy	I Dinnison
1981		M Eaton	D Bradshaw
1981		S Stranks	G Goodall
1981			P Clements
1981			R Smith
1982	M Eaton	A Hancock	J Homburg
1982			M Kenny
1982			P Favilla
1982			R Neil
1983	MA Crosby	BW Eckert	AM Brewer
1983	PH Sharley	CW Schulz	HAL Abbott
1983		D Proudman	JA Deboer
1983		RI Anderson	JK Wellington
1983			PJ Decure
1984	CW Schulz		A Nurk
1984	RI Anderson		CP Ball
1984			DC Eaton
1984			RJ Hearn
1985		MC Watson	DA Taylor
1985		RHJ Kimber	F Cockburn
1985		TW Proudman	RB Keynes
1986	MJ Dadds	AL Ewers	D Hancock
1986		CC James	J Carey
1986			J Richardson
1986			M Ashwood
1986			M Schapel
1986			R Brown
1987		SW Braidwood	AG Puddy
1987			AG Stanley
1987			PH Maddern
1987			PJ Golding
1987			PS Oleary
1987			RJ Maloney
1987			RR Martin
1988	AD Muir	DR Johnson	BF Austin
1988			DM Gordon
1988			MF Altmann
1988			SP Parker
1989	R Alm	P Hammond	A Fulwood
1989			D McGrath
1990	C Williams		A Leunig
1990			D Graetz
1990			S Nickless
1991	A Milln	P O'Donnell	A Whittam
1991	S Kewell	S Smid	T Hancock
1992	D Johnson	J Edwards	J Finnis
1992			S Fairbrother
1992			T Burfield
1993	J Edward	S Moore	G Miles
1993			J Restas
1993			R Bradley
1994			A Stenhouse
1994			A Wallace
1994			J Priest
1994			M Warren
1994			S Kimber
1995			K Murchison
1995			M Bird
1995			P Baker
1995			T Charlton
1996		A Roediger	B Parsons
1996			C Rule
1996			S McGahan
1996			T Shierlaw
1997		C Pascoe	B Bishop
1997			B Ridgen
1997			P Wildy
1997			W Scott-Young
1998		T Martin	A Lamb
1998			C Bryson
1998			D Papps
1998			M Aplin
1998			M Ellery
1999	N Rudge		D O'Reilly
1999			M Bruening
1999			R Foster
1999			S Daly
1999			W Chapman
2000			G Davis
2000			J Sibbick
2000			K Harvey
2000			M Danielak
2000			S Bridgwood
2000			T Katsaros
2001	J Fraser	C Doyle	T Wadham
2001			E Arnold
2001			G Burton
2001			M Huppatz
2001			T Bryson
2002	T Martin	J Lewis	F Primerano
2002			H Dillon
2002			J Nayler
2002			L O'Callaghan
2002			S Clark
2003		P Lemessurier	B Cardone
2003			B Northey
2003			D Thomas
2003			J Vanderloo
2003			M Chase
2003			S Ritchie
2003			S Verall
2004	A Alesci	A Pearce	A Dimarzo
2004	J Loechel		A Kretschmer
2004	J Worthley		C Uppington
2004			G Clark
2006	T Cooper		
2008	C Bankes	T Bateman	A Burke
2008		T Prest	A Dimarzo
2008			B Champion
2008			B Vezis
2008			C Puccini
2008			D Graetz
2008			J Waddington
2008			M Mayes
2008			P Hochman
2008			P Maddern
2008			R Foster
2008			T Bernard
2008			W Legrand
2009		D Harrington	D Coats
2009			G Krievs
2009			J Harry
2009			L Rogers
2009			S Uppington
2009			S Vezis
2009			T Reid
2009			W Abrey
2010	T Bateman	B Davis	
2011	B Davis	P Mulvihill	S Parker
2012	G Wellington		A Howard
2012			A Lines
2012			M Henderson
2012			S Lewis
2012			W King
2013			D Crouch
2013			D Tofan
2013			N Hallion
2013			T Davies
2014			C Rohde
2014			T Muecke
2014			W Paynter
2015			B Green
2015			B Smelt
2015			C Tsoumbris
2015			K Green
2015			M Beilby
2015			S Paynter
2015			T Walker
2015			W Evans
2016	N Burns	N Cottrell	A Vallelonga
2016			B Meier
2016			D Blyth
2016			J Edwards
2016			W Paynter
2016			Z Hambour

=== Office bearers ===
Records obtained from annual reports.

Year	Patron	President	Chairman	Secretary	Treasurer	Ass. secretary/ coordinator	Coach	Captain	Best & Fairest	A Grade Pos^{n}	Premiers	SAAFL medalists
1906				W.G. Reid				H.W.D. Stoddardt		5		
1907				C.E. Dolling				T.H. Donnelly		9		
1908				B. Hand						No Active Team		
1909				C.E. Dolling						No Active Team		
1910				H.W.D. Stoddardt						No Active Team		
1911				F. Le Messurier				H.W.D. Stoddardt C.F. Drew		1	A1	
1912				K.N. Steele		I.B. Jose		F.N. Le Messurier		1	A1	
1913				F.E. Williams				J.W. Blacket		3		
1914				D.M. Steele				J.W. Blacket		2	Students Assoc.	
1915				H.L. Rayner				C.E. Pellow		4		C.E. Pellow (A1)
1916-1919	First World War											
1920				R.O. Fox		G. Melville C. Koern	A.H. White	A.H. White		1	A1, Students Assoc.	B. Roberts (Students Assoc.)
1921				R.O. Fox				H.G. Prest		1	A1	
1922				C.E. Willing		C.T. Piper	W. Hutton	H.G. Prest		1	A1, Students Assoc.	H.G. Prest (A1)
1923				N.S. Gunning			W. Hutton	H.G. Prest		2		
1924				N.S. Gunning			W. Hutton	T.D Finney		3		
1925				G. Fisher			S.N. McKee	T.D Finney		3		
1926				D.K. McKenzie			S.N. McKee	D.G. McKay		1	A1	
1927				C.B. Sangster			S.N. McKee	D.G. McKay		2		
1928				C.B. Sangster			S.N. McKee	C.B. Sangster	C.B. Sangster	3		
1929				F.H. Finlayson		J. Maitland	P. Lewis	C.B. Sangster		1	A1	C.B. Sangster (A1)
1930				E.A. Schulz			S.H. Lewis	C.B. Sangster		2		
1931				W.H. Baudinet		R.S. Day	S.H. Lewis	C.B. Sangster		4		
1932				K.A. McDonald		R.S. Day	C.C. Daly	R.LeP. Meucke		1	A1	
1933				R.H. Elix			C.C. Daly	J.M.J. Jens	D.F. Burnard	2		
1934				G.D. Dawson			C.C. Daly	J.M.J. Jens		2		
1935				B.M. Jolly		W.C.J. White	C.C. Daly	W.H. Baudinet	J.P. McFarlane	4		
1936				R.F. Brown		L.E. Verco	M.W. Evans	R.H. Elix	R.H. Elix	5		
1937				J.W. Sangster			M.W. Evans	R.H. Elix	P. Kleinschmidt	5		
1938				D.L. Elix		M.G. Gratton	M.W. Evans	R.H. Elix	D.C. Dawkins	5		
1939				B.A. Magarey		A.P. Cherry	M.W. Evans	J.J. Rice	R.T. Steele	8		
1940				J.D. Hill			H. Page	W.J. Betts	J.E. Dunstan	5		
1941				N.C. Shierlaw			H. Page	W.J. Betts		4		
1942-1945	Second World War											
1946		N.S. Gunning		D. Robinson		J.L. Whittle	L.J. Tugwell	B.R. Goode	A. Tregonning	2		
1947		N.S. Gunning		R.M. Holmes			H.Page	A. Tregonning	D.L. Davies	Disq		
1948		N.S. Gunning		D.M. Brebner			H.Page	A. Tregonning	C.C. Dewar	2		
1949		C.B. Sangster		D.M. Brebner	D.M. Brebner		H.Page	D.I. Harris	D.M. Brebner	4		
1950		C.B. Sangster		J.A. Cooper	K.R. Seedsman	K.R. Seedsman	H.Page	D.M. Brebner	J.K.A. McLeod	4		
1951		C.B. Sangster		R.C. Bennett	R. Lawrence	P. Tunbridge	E.G. Tilley	C.F Robertson		1	A1	
1952		C.B. Sangster		R.G. Lawrence	J.G. Martin	P. Tunbridge	E.G. Tilley	D.I. Harris	I.N. Broadbent	1	A1	
1953		C.B. Sangster		K.D. Fitch	J. Lawrie	W. McLeay	E.G. Tilley	R.L. Elix	R.L. Elix	2		J.K.A. McLeod (A1)
1954		R.T. Steele		R.L. Whittle	D.G. Clayton	R.S. Greet	E.G. Tilley	J.K.A. McLeod	G.E. Krieger	1	A1	
1955		R.T. Steele		A.F. Malone	R.S. Greet	T. Hanson	E.G. Tilley	P.G. Pak-Poy	R.G. Johnson	1	A1	
1956		R.T. Steele		J.M. Taylor	F. Hamby	R. Haselgrove	E.G. Tilley	P.G. Pak-Poy	R.H. Tuckwell	2		
1957		R.T. Steele		T. Hanson	D. Terrell	P.S. Clayton	L.G. Giles	J.W. Downer	J.C. Lill	3		
1958		R.T. Steele		P.S. Clayton	R. Lee	B.M Seppelt	L.G. Giles	J.W. Downer	J.C. Lill	2		
1959		R.T. Steele		B.M Seppelt	G. Spurling	M. Montgomery	L.G. Giles	G.E. Krieger	A.R. Clarkson	3		A.R. Clarkson (A1)
1960		J.B. Day		J.P. Rice	C.H.A. Meyer	R.F. Floreani	A.J. Greer	B.M. Seppelt	A.R. Clarkson	1	A1	A.R. Clarkson (A1)
1961		J.B. Day		C.H.A. Meyer	A.D. Shepherd	M.R. Sage	A.J. Greer	A.R. Clarkson	J.F Hooper	1	A1, A5	
1962		J.B. Day		M.R. Sage	R.J. Fleur	A.J. McMichael	A.J. Greer	A.R. Clarkson	D.C. Hill	1	A1	D.C. Hill (A1)
1963		J.B. Day		P.D. Clark	G.A. Seppelt	W.R. Jackson	A.J. Greer	A.E. Byers	A.E. Byers	2		D.M. Harrison (A2R)
1964		J.B. Day		R.G. Todd	D.J. Dall	D.M. Harrison	A.J. Greer	J. Ferguson	A.J. Prior	2	A3R	D.M. Harrison (A3R)
1965		J.B. Day		D. Muirhead	W.R. Haslam	R.G. Gask	A.J. Greer	J.F. Sangster	W.R. Haslam	1	A1, A3, A1R	D.M. Harrison (A3R)
1966	G. Ligertwood	J.B. Day		I.R. Jonasson	R.G. Todd	D.R. Muirhead	A.J. Greer	P.D. Clark	J.R. Blake	2		
1967	G. Ligertwood	J.B. Day	R.L. Whittle	I.R. Jonasson	R.H. Meucke	P.J.L. Rofe	A.J. Greer	I.F. Edgley	B.R. Simmons	2	A2R	
1968	G.M. Badger	J.B. Day	R.L. Whittle	P.J.L. Rofe	R.H. Meucke	B. Daniels	D.F. Kimber	J.R. Blake	P.J.L. Rofe	1	A1	
1969	G.M. Badger	J.B. Day	R.L. Whittle	J. McMurtrie	B. Jenkins	D.S.E. Day	P.R. Vivian	P.J.L. Rofe	V.J. Bondar	1	A1	
1970	G.M. Badger	R.L. Whittle	R.G. Gask	D.S.E. Day	B. Jenkins	O.M. Keen	P.R. Vivian	P.J.L. Rofe	J. Katsaros	6		
1971	G.M. Badger	R.L. Whittle	R.G. Gask	O.M. Keen	B. Jenkins	D.J. Hart	P.R. Vivian	P.J.L. Rofe	F. Morgan	4		
1972	G.M. Badger	R.L. Whittle	R.G. Gask	D.J. Hart	R.B. Howlett	S. Baker	B. Wells	P.J.L. Rofe	P. Holbrook	5	A4R	A. Davis (A4R)
1973	G.M. Badger	R.L. Whittle	R.G. Gask	J.D. McFarlane	M. Byrt D.N. Bartlett	R.J.F. Harley	D. Panizza	P.J.L. Rofe	J. Katsaros	3		
1974	G.M. Badger	R.L. Whittle	R.G. Gask	G.I. Lawrence	D.N. Bartlett	E.P. Olekains	K.R. Griffiths	K.R. Griffiths	D.N. Bartlett	1	A1	
1975	G.M. Badger	R.L. Whittle	R.G. Gask	H.A. McGrath	D.N. Bartlett	E.P. Olekains	K.R. Griffiths	K.R. Griffiths	M. Schwartz	1	A1	
1976	G.M. Badger	R.L. Whittle	R.G. Gask	E.P. Olekains	D.N. Bartlett	N.W. Page	K.R. Griffiths	K.R. Griffiths	E.P. Olekains	2		
1977	Prof D.R. Stranks	R.L. Whittle	R.G. Gask	N.W. Page	D.N. Bartlett	P.D. Favilla	L.I. Hoskins	M. Schwartz	S. Skov	5		
1978	Prof D.R. Stranks	P.D. Clark	G.C. Harcourt	P.D. Favilla	D.N. Bartlett	I.A. Dinnison	L.I. Hoskins	M. Schwartz	R.J. Hearn	4	A8	
1979	Prof D.R. Stranks	P.D. Clark	G.C. Harcourt	I.A. Dinnison	D.N. Bartlett	P. Parry	L.I. Hoskins	M. Schwartz	E.P. Olekains	4		E.P. Olekains (A1)J. Green (A7)
1980	Prof D.R. Stranks	P.D. Clark	M. Schwartz	I.A. Dinnison	D.N. Bartlett	P.H. Cox	F.A. Bloch	E.P. Olekains	M. Kerr-Grant	3	A1R, A8	N.W. Page (A1R) W.T. Sarre (A8)
1981	Prof D.R. Stranks	Dr N.C. Beagley	J.A. Homburg	R.S. Smith	D.N. Bartlett	B. Austin	F.A. Bloch	E.P. Olekains	E.P. Olekains	4		
1982	Prof D.R. Stranks	Dr N.C. Beagley	J.A. Homburg	R.S. Smith	D.N. Bartlett	P.J. deCure	M.A. Weatherald	E.P. Olekains	E.P. Olekains	4	A3R, A9	R.J. Carey (A3R)
1983	Prof D.R. Stranks	Dr N.C. Beagley	J.A. Homburg	R.S. Smith	D.N. Bartlett	F.A. Bloch	M.A. Weatherald	E.P. Olekains	E.P. Olekains	2	A3R	
1984	Prof D.R. Stranks	Dr N.C. Beagley	J.A. Homburg	G.R. Martin F.A. Bloch	D.N. Bartlett	F.A. Bloch	M.A. Weatherald	M.D. Kenny	C.W. Schultz	4	A1R	D.A. Taylor (A3R) W.T. Sarre (A9)
1985	Prof D.R. Stranks	M. Schwartz	J.A. Homburg	R.G. Brown	D.N. Bartlett	F.A. Bloch	M.A. Weatherald	M.D. Kenny	M.D. Kenny	5		R.N. Smith (A7)
1986	Prof D.R. Stranks	M. Schwartz	J.A. Homburg	D.A. Taylor	R.G. Brown	F.A. Bloch	J.D. Griffen	M.D. Kenny	M.J. Dadds	1	A1, A8, A9	
1987	K.M. Marjoribanks	M. Schwartz	J.A. Homburg	F.A. Bloch	R.G. Brown	J.A. deBoer	J.D. Griffen	S.P. Parker	A.D. Muir	7		E.P. Olekains (A1R)A. Hancock (A3R)
1988	K.M. Marjoribanks	M. Schwartz	P.H. Maddern	F.A. Bloch	P.J. deCure	A.M. Leunig	P.A. Whaley	M.J. Dadds	A.D. Muir	5	A9	A.C. Lee (A1R) D.W. Hancock (A3R) D.G. McGrath (A7R) G.R. Parker (A10) A.W. White (A11)
1989	K.M. Marjoribanks	M. Schwartz	P.H. Maddern	F.A. Bloch	S.R. Nickless	A.M. Leunig	P.A. Whaley	C.D. Williams	R.A. Alm	6	A3R, A8R	T.B. Thompson (A8R)
1990	K.M. Marjoribanks	M. Schwartz	P.H. Maddern	D.W. Hancock	S.R. Nickless	A.P. Mitchell F.A. Bloch	J.D. Turnbull	C.D. Williams	G.R. Miles	5	A8, A8R, A11	R.D. Porter (A1R) R.P. Pfitzner (A4R)
1991	K.M. Marjoribanks	M. Schwartz	P.H. Maddern	D.W. Hancock	S.R. Nickless	A.P. Mitchell F.A. Bloch	D.K. West	C.D. Williams	J. Finnis	4	A1R	
1992	K.M. Marjoribanks	M. Schwartz	D.M. Gordon	D.W. Hancock	S.R. Nickless	M.J. Rady F.A. Bloch	D.K. West	A.D. Muir	C. Gray	6		K.M. Murchison (A7) R.B. Bradley (A7R)
1993	K.M. Marjoribanks	M. Schwartz	D.N. Bartlett	P.M. Dinnick	J. Restas	D.P. Benger F.A. Bloch	D.K. West	A.D. Muir	G.R. Miles	4		B.H. Higgins (A1) T.M. Hancock (A7R)
1994	K.M. Marjoribanks	M. Schwartz	D.N. Bartlett	P.M. Dinnick J.S. Nayler	J. Restas	D.P. Benger F.A. Bloch	D.K. West	A.D. Muir	G.R. Miles	4	A6R, A8, A8R	
1995	G. Brown	M. Schwartz	A.J. Stenhouse	F.A. Bloch	M.J. Bird	G.G. Fairbrother F.A. Bloch	D.K. West	A.D. Muir	A.D. Muir	5		D.G. McGrath (A7)
1996	G. Brown	P.H. Maddern	A.J. Stenhouse	F.A. Bloch	M.J. Bird	B.C. Roberts F.A. Bloch	T. McEvoy N.R. Annear	A.D. Muir	K.C. Roberts-Thomson	1	P1, A4R	
1997	W.F. Scammell	P.H. Maddern	C. McGahan	F.A. Bloch	M.J. Bird	S.D. Kimber F.A. Bloch	T. McEvoy N.R. Annear	G.R. Miles	S.C. Dixon	5	D8S, D8N, D10S, D8SR, D8NR	
1998	W.F. Scammell	P.H. Maddern	C. McGahan	F.A. Bloch	M.J. Bird	B.W. Bishop F.A. Bloch	P. Simmons	G.R. Miles	D.S. Thomas	3		P.W. Sarson (D1R) G.D. Schapel (D8R)
1999	W.F. Scammell	P.H. Maddern	C. McGahan	F.A. Bloch	M.J. Bird	B.W. Bishop F.A. Bloch	P. Simmons	S.C. McGahan	A.D. Muir	1	D1, D9N	T.M. Charlton (D1R) L.J. Fitzgerald (D9N)
2000	W.F. Scammell	P.H. Maddern	R.B. Miles	F.A. Bloch	M.J. Bird	B.W. Bishop F.A. Bloch	B.P. Phillips	T.J. Katsaros	E.M. Arnold	6	D8, D7R	W.L. Legrand (D7R)
2001	W.F. Scammell	P.H. Maddern	R.B. Miles	F.A. Bloch	M.J. Bird	R.W. Foster F.A. Bloch	B.P. Phillips	T.J. Davies	A.D. Muir	2	D7R	J.J. Sibbick (D1) C.J. Pick (D7R)
2002	R.J. Champion de Crespigny	P.H. Maddern	R.B. Miles	R.W. Foster	M.J. Bird	C.I. Mudge F.A. Bloch	W.B. Ploenges	T.J. Davies	T.P. Martin	2	D8R	A.T. Darcey (D8) W.L. Legrand (D8R) S.J. Work (D10N)
2003	R.J. Champion de Crespigny	P.H. Maddern	R.B. Miles	R.W. Foster	M.J. Bird	C.S. Uppington F.A. Bloch	W.B. Ploenges	E.M. Arnold	B.J. Cardone	5	D1R, D7, D7R	
2004	R.J. Champion de Crespigny	P.H. Maddern	R.B. Miles	R.W. Foster	M.J. Bird	C.I. Mudge F.A. Bloch	S.J. Jackson	T.P. Martin	P.D. Magarey	5	D1R, D10N	W.L. Legrand (D6R)
2005	J.C. Bannon	P.H. Maddern	R.B. Miles	R.W. Foster	M.J. Bird	J.A. Dalwood F.A. Bloch	J.J. Mason	T.P. Martin	C.C. Roberts-Thomson	7	D10N	W.L. Legrand (D6R) M.M. Neate (D10N)
2006	J.C. Bannon	P.H. Maddern	R.B. Miles	R.W. Foster	M.J. Bird	T.N. Colebatch F.A. Bloch	J.J. Mason	T.P. Martin	J.L. Vanderloo	2	D1R, D8, D6R	W.L. Legrand (D6R) J.R. Nelson (D9N)
2007												
2007												
2009												
2010												
2011												
2012	J.A. McWha	M.J. Dadds	S.W. Bridgwood	W. Abrey	I. Hinton	N. Spencer A. Howard	M. Trimboli			2		
2013												
2014												
2015												
2016												

=== Leading goals / games ===
Accurate to 2012.

Name	Goals	Name	Games
Darren Greatz	1353	Darren Greatz	469
Digby Hancock	720	Michael Bird	313
Evan Arnold	532	Mariusz Danielak	304
Adrian Howard	477	Andrew Muir	303
Alexander Hancock	447	William Scott-Young	301
Darien O'Reilly	409	Clinton Rule	291
Peter Maddern	343	Adrian Howard	270
Ben Vezis	338	Graham Burton	266
Tim Burfield	326	Simon Ritchie	260
Nicholas Vezis	323	Wesley Legrand	256

== Women's football ==
The club formed a Women's team in 2013 and entered it in the SAWFL. Initially the club struggled to field a full side and had to forfeit a couple of games. However, Women's AFL was one of the fastest growing sports in SA in 2015 and the amount of interest has given the club a full bench most weeks.

In 2015 the Women of The World's Greatest Football Club won their first Premiership, in Division 2 of the SAWFL, defeating Angle Vale by 1 point, after trailing by 1 point with the ball at the wrong end of the ground with 2 minutes to play. In 2016 the club expanded to two Women's teams, competing in both Division 1 and Division 2 of the SAWFL, finishing 3rd in both Divisions.

After this season the SANFL launched its Women's competition, and The Blacks had almost 20 players recruited into this competition. The Blacks also had its head coach from 2016, Tess Baxter, appointed as an assistant coach of the Norwood Football Club.

In 2017, with the commencement of the Women's AFL, the club again expanded its women's operations, fielding teams in Division 1, Division 2 and Division 4 of the SAWFL. The Division 2 team missed finals, but put in good performances against predominantly all A Grade teams in this division. The Division 4 team won the Premiership, becoming the second team in the club's history to win a Women's Premiership, and were followed a few hours later with the third Premiership for the club by the Division 1 team winning the club's first Division 1 Premiership, becoming Undefeated Premiers.

Following this season the club had its first players drafted to the AFLW, with Marijana Rajcic and Ruth Wallace being recruited to the Adelaide Football Club, Courtney Gum and Tait Mackrill recruited to the Greater Western Sydney Football Club, and Sophie Li recruited to the Carlton Football Club.

The club also had a large number of girls chosen by SANFL Women's teams again, with roughly 20 girls chosen to represent these teams. The Blacks again had its head coach from 2017 recruited into the coaching ranks of the SANFLW, with Krissie Steen being appointed as head coach of the South Adelaide Football Club. The club also had its Division 1 assistant coaches from 2017 recruited to the South Adelaide Football Club, that being Chris Bennett and Rick Watts.

== Teams ==
The constitution of the AUFC states that it is an objective of the club to "foster and cultivate the spirit of sportsmanship... among the Adelaide University students" and to choose as many football teams as possible and practicable from among the members of the club."

Every team is given a name which is usually some obscure reference to the coach, however the bottom team is always known as The Scum. Additionally every other club in the SAAFL is given an obscure name as well. The weekly club presentations "Hold your Bowlies" is held every Saturday night during the season. This is an irreverent and very humorous summary of each team's performance.

Keg Rules:

1. If, during one football round, the club suffers only one loss across all its teams (i.e. one team loses whilst all other teams win), the team that lost is required to purchase the club a keg of West End (Bob Neil's favourite).
  - Exclusion: The Scum (being the bottom team) are expected to lose. If they are the one team that loses, they have done their duty. The club is required to purchase The Scum a keg of West End.
2. If all teams win during a round, The Scum is required to purchase the club a keg of West End.

=== Current teams ===
Men's	SAAFL	Team name
A Grade	Div 2	Dwaine & his Rock Johnsons
B Grade	Div 2R	Wilson & his Castaways
C Grade	C2	B@stards
D Grade	C5	Seagull & the Frat Boys
E Grade	C6	The Brady Bunch
F Grade	C7	Cookie and his Master Bakers
G Grade	C7	The Scum

Women's	SAWFL	Team name
A Grade	Div 3	Forest and his Gumps
B Grade	Div 5	No Coach, No Worries

=== Former teams ===
- Whaley's Comets
- The Glamour Side
- The Sand Baggers
- Hancock's Half Hour
- Solomons and the Trouser Snakes
- Doris Stokes and the Sooth Sayers
- Alex White and the Dwarfs
- Rule Book and the Flyblown
- Solomons and the Twilight Zone
- Rabbit Warren and the Killer Bunnies
- Qua Qua and the Crows (featuring Big Hairy Willy)
- J.T. and the Lower Digits
- Paul Whaley and the Womets?!
- Tonto and the "Well-Hung" Posse
- The Sty Council
- The Wicked Witches of the Westies
- R.B.J. and the Models
- Dennis and the Dominators
- Barty and the Simpsons
- The Magnificent 7's
- The Under 8's
- The Dream Team
- Monty's Pythons
- Jerk and the Offs!
- The Side of Lamb
- Sgt. Schultz and the Know Nothings
- The Jackson Sixers
- Parson's Nose and the Chicken Pluckers
- Otto Von Kretschmer and his Seamen
- Ra-Ra's Ratbags
- Mac Attack and the Sleepy Lizards
- Appo's Angels in the Division from Hell
- Foster's Green Arseholes
- Arson Garson and the Hayburners
- The Verrall Cat Stew
- Silvestri and the Suckatash
- Hollywood Denno and the C-Grade Actors
- Big Hairy Willie and the Waxed Ballbags
- Simmo and his Donkeys
- Smithy's Smelly No. 2's
- Container Kelly and the Stevedores
- Bitch and his Bastards
- The Farmers
- The Grady Bunch
- Crazy Vezis and the Looneys
- Sticks and the Stickmen
- Kernas and the Dewkickers
- One-Arm Bandit and the Pokies
- Class Traitor and the Upstarts
- Bruce Willis and the Yippie Kie Aye Mother F*ckers
- 3-Phase Rhigas and the Socket To Me's
- Wow and the Septic Plungers
- Jimmy and the Beach Boys
- The Girl Guides
- King and the Court Jesters
- Sugar Ray and the Cowboys from Hell
- Screecher and his Deaf C's
- Gentleman Jack and his Wild Turkeys
- Spud O'Leary and the Non-Fighting Irish
- Sexy Pimp and his Big Blue Hat Full of C-Men
- The Kenny Everitt Video Show
- The Greys
- The Postie and her Dead Letter Office Raiders
- Hollywood and his Rising Stars

== Notable former club players/members ==
- Anthony Lehmann
- Graham Cornes
- Max Basheer
- Nick Gill
- Bob Neil
- Paul Rofe
- Sean Tasker
- Wayne Jackson
- Nathan Bassett
- Peter Malinauskas

== See also ==
- South Australian Amateur Football League
- Sydney University Students AFC
- Melbourne University Football Club

== Bibliography ==
- 75th Anniversary of the Adelaide University Football Club, compiled 1981. A copy is available for viewing in the Archives of the University of Adelaide.
