= Members of the South Australian Legislative Council, 1836–1843 =

This is a list of members of the South Australian Legislative Council from 1836 to 1843. Beginning with the arrival of John Hindmarsh on 28 December 1836, there were five members of the Council of Government, both Executive and Legislative, consisting of: the Governor, Judge, Colonial Secretary, Advocate-General, and Resident Commissioner until 4 December 1838. From the latter date until 20 February 1843, the officials were: the Governor and Resident Commissioner, Colonial Secretary, Advocate-General, Surveyor-General, and Assistant Commissioner of Lands.

Name	Office	Term
Robert Bernard	Advocate-General	1838–1840
James Hurtle Fisher	Resident Commissioner	1836–1838
Edward Charles Frome	Surveyor-General	1839–1843
George Gawler	Governor & Resident Commissioner	1838–1841
Robert Gouger	Colonial Secretary	1836–1837, 1839–41
George Grey	Governor & Resident Commissioner	1841–1845
George Hall	Assistant Commissioner of Lands (acting)	1839
John Hindmarsh	Governor	1836–1838
John Alexander Jackson	Colonial Secretary	1841–1843
John Jeffcott	Judge	1836–1837
Henry Jickling	Judge	1837–1838
Charles Mann	Advocate-General & Crown Solicitor	1836–1837
William Smillie	Advocate-General	1840–1851
George Milner Stephen	Colonial Secretary ^{[a]}	1838–1839
Thomas Bewes Strangways	Colonial Secretary	1837–1838
Charles Sturt ^{[b]}	Surveyor-General	1839
Charles Sturt ^{[b]}	Assistant Commissioner of Lands	1839–1843

^{[a]} Stephen was Advocate-General & Crown Solicitor 9 February 1838 to 18 July 1838; acting Governor 16 July 1838 to 12 October 1838; and Colonial Secretary 5 December 1838 to July 1839
^{[b]} Sturt was later Registrar-General 1839 and 1846–1847; Colonial Secretary 1849–1851
