= Robert Gouger =

First Colonial Secretary of South Australia

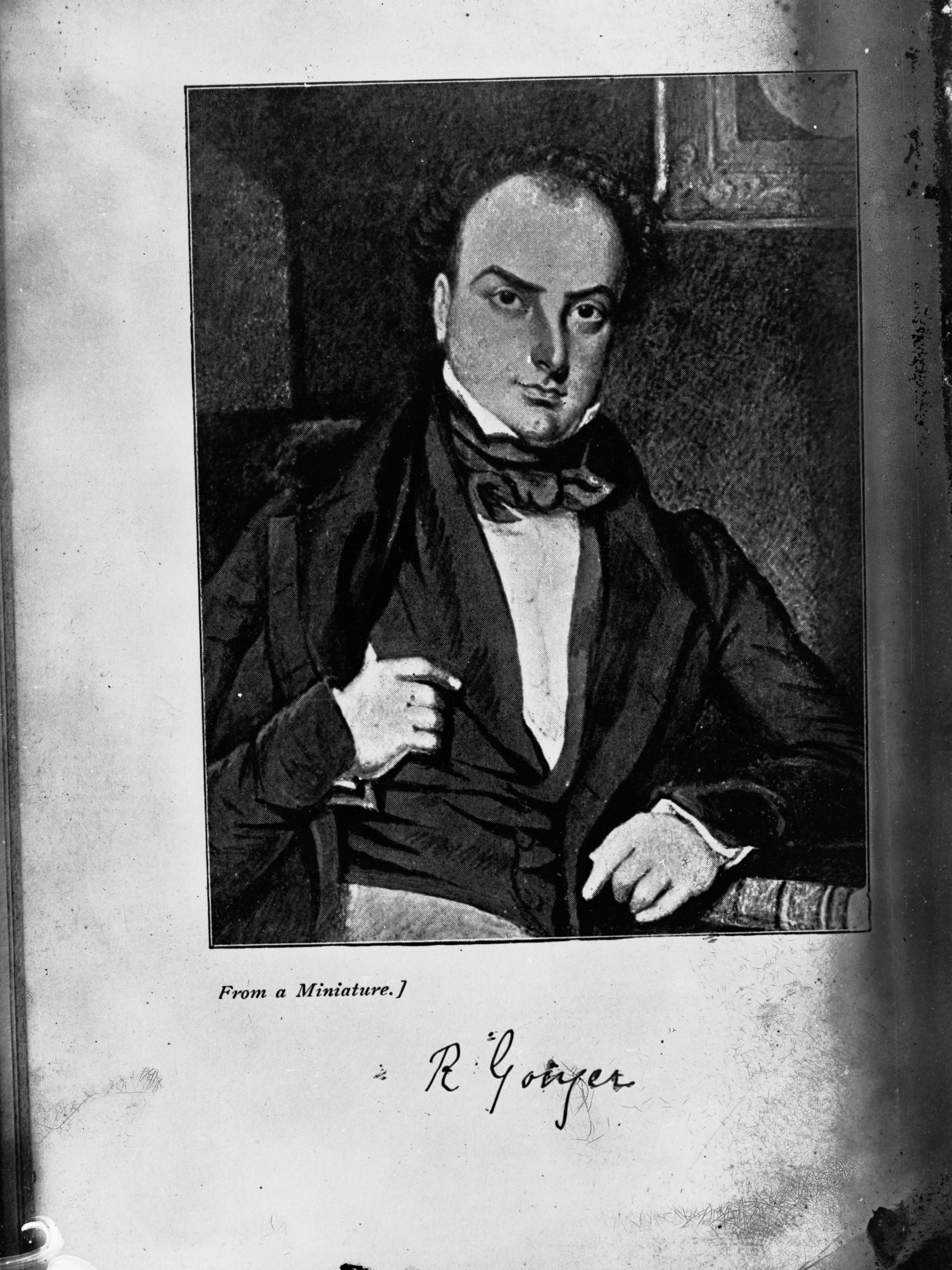
- Gouger, 1830

Colonial Secretary of South Australia
- In office 28 December 1836 – 22 August 1837
- Governor: Rear Admiral Hindmarsh
- Preceded by: office established
- Succeeded by: Thomas Strangways
- In office 8 July 1839 – 16 October 1841
- Governor: George Gawler; Sir George Grey
- Preceded by: George Stephen
- Succeeded by: John A. Jackson

Treasurer of South Australia
- In office 16 October 1841 – July 1844
- Preceded by: John A. Jackson
- Succeeded by: James MacDonald

Member of the Legislative Council of South Australia
- In office 28 December 1836 – 22 August 1837
- Preceded by: council established
- Succeeded by: Thomas Strangways
- In office 8 July 1839 – 16 October 1841
- Preceded by: George Stephen
- Succeeded by: Sir George Grey; John A. Jackson

Personal details
- Born: 26 June 1802 Paris, Île de France, France
- Died: 4 August 1846 (aged 44) Kensington, London, England
- Spouse: Harriet Jackson (m. 1835) Sarah Whittem (m. 1838)
- Children: 4
- Known for: One of the founders of South Australia and the first Colonial Secretary of South Australia

Robert Gouger (/ˈɡʊdʒər/ GUUJ-ər; 26 June 1802 – 4 August 1846) was an English promoter of colonisation and public servant, one of the founders of South Australia and the first Colonial Secretary of South Australia. He spent a decade in London as secretary to a succession of societies that campaigned for the new province, culminating in the South Australia Association and the passage of the South Australia Act 1834.

== Early life ==
Gouger was the fifth son of nine children of George Gouger (1763–1802), a London merchant, and his wife Anne Sibley. His childhood was spent at Stamford, Lincolnshire, attended school in Nottingham, and was then taken into his father's London office.

Brought up a Dissenter, Gouger travelled widely, writing poems for the magazines, and took a keen interest in natural history. A friendship with the reformer Robert Owen gave his philanthropy a radical political focus, and his concern for the condition of the poor, and frustration with the Poor Laws, led him to believe that emigration and colonisation were a remedy to social troubles.

== Colonisation movement ==
In 1829 Gouger was weighing up an offer to manage Thomas Potter Macqueen's Swan River Colony venture when a visit to Edward Gibbon Wakefield, then confined to Newgate Prison, won him over to Wakefield's systematic colonisation scheme. The scheme involved funding free emigration by selling colonially seized lands at a fixed price rather than granting it away. The two collaborated on Sketch of a proposal for Colonising Australasia (June 1829), and later that year Gouger edited Wakefield's A Letter from Sydney for publication.

In November 1829, an unpaid printing bill put Gouger in King's Bench Prison. His cellmate was Anthony Bacon (1796–1864) and it was here that he first learned of Captain Henry Dixon's accounts of southern Australia. Released after his brother met the debt, he circulated copies of the Letter to little effect until Robert Wilmot Horton helped him form a society for assisting pauper emigration. The newly formed National Colonisation Society made Gouger its secretary, but it fell apart over doctrinal differences once Wakefield emerged from Newgate in May 1830.

Gouger persisted through the short-lived South Australian Land Company and then, from December 1833, as secretary of the South Australian Association, lobbying parliament and the press, eventually winning over the Duke of Wellington, until the South Australia Act passed in August 1834. Gouger was appointed colonial secretary of the proposed province when the South Australian Colonization Commission was gazetted in May 1835.

== Colonial Secretary of South Australia ==
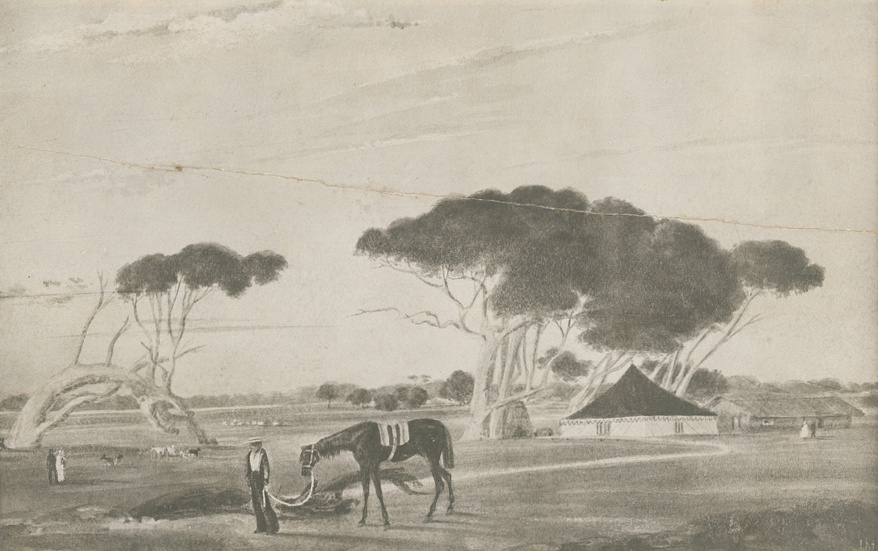
Gouger's hut and tent at Glenelg. Sketch by J. M. Skipper.

Gouger married Harriet Jackson in London on 22 October 1835, and less than a year later, the couple sailed for the colony aboard the Africaine. They reached Holdfast Bay in November 1836. Governor John Hindmarsh landed on 28 December 1836, the province of South Australia was proclaimed beside Gouger's tent at Glenelg, and the colony's Council of Government held its first meeting inside it. At the first sale of town lands he bought 8 acres (3.2 ha) in the new capital.

Gouger was a member of the South Australian Legislative Council from 28 December 1836 to 22 August 1837 when he was suspended from his duties as Colonial Secretary after a physical altercation with the Colonial Treasurer, Osmond Gilles. Despite protests from the Council, Hindmarsh suspended Gouger from office, and Gouger sailed for England on 8 November 1837 to defend himself before the commissioners. Hindmarsh's decision was invalidated and Gouger reinstated. While in London he published South Australia in 1837; in a Series of Letters, a guide addressed to intending emigrants.

Returning to the colony in 1839, he resumed the colonial secretaryship on 8 July. The South Australian Register reported that he had been reinstated "under orders from Lord Glenelg". Gouger relinquished the position of Secretary for the less strenuous position of Colonial Treasurer in 1841 and returned to England in 1844 due to continuing poor health.

Whilst in the colony, Gouger took an interest in the South Australian Railway Company, became an agent for John Abel Smith and a chairman for the Adelaide Hospital in 1844.

== Personal life ==
The first year of the South Australian Colony brought Gouger much personal tragedy and public disgrace. His first wife, Harriet, had contracted tuberculosis on the voyage out to South Australia, and died on 14 March 1837, aged 32. Their son, Henry Hindmarsh Gouger, died the day after his mother. Henry had been born close to the date of the colony's proclamation.

Gouger's second wife was Sarah Whittem, a cousin, the daughter of Thomas Whittem, whom he married at Kenilworth, on 18 October 1838. The couple had three children, Robert Sibley Gouger (born 1843), Sarah Adelaide Gouger (born 1843) and Henry Whittem Gouger (born 1846).

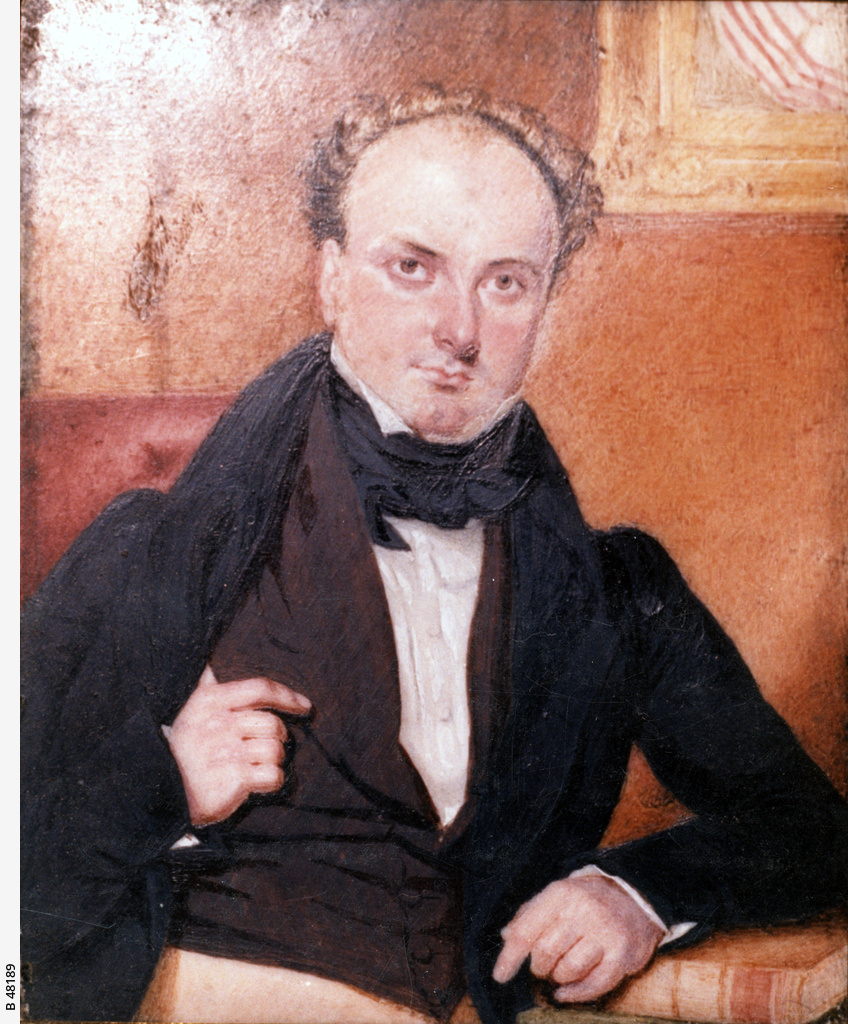
Original painting of Robert Gouger held in the Art Gallery of South Australia.

Gouger was a committed member of Freemasonry and a founding member of the South Australian Lodge of Friendship. He was elected and initiated into the Craft at the first meeting of that Lodge which was held on 27 November 1834 at the South Australian Association in London. This Lodge was especially founded to become the first Lodge in the yet to be proclaimed colony of South Australia.

For many years after the death of his first wife and son, he had suffered from bouts of depression and anxiety which had impacted on his health. Gouger died at Kensington, London, on 4 August 1846, at the age of 44, after returning to England.

== Works ==
- Gouger, Robert (1833). Emigration for the relief of parishes practically considered . London : Ridgway and E. Wilson. ISBN 978-0-665-21425-7.
- Gouger, Robert. (1838). South Australia in 1837 : in a series of letters, with a postscript as to 1838. London: Harvey and Darton.

== Legacy ==
Gouger Street in Adelaide was named in his honour.

== See also ==
- French Australian

== Sources ==
- Gouger, Robert (1802 - 1846), Australian Dictionary of Biography, Volume 1, Melbourne University Press, 1966, pp 461–463.
- Gouger Street, History of Adelaide Through Street Names: Streets Named on 23 May 1837 (Archived page, historysouthaustralia.net)
- Serle, Percival (1949). "Gouger, Robert". Dictionary of Australian Biography. Sydney: Angus & Robertson.

Parliament of South Australia
New district	Member of the South Australian Legislative Council; 1836–1837; Served alongside: Multiple Members	Succeeded by Henry Jickling; Thomas B. Strangways
Preceded by George M. Stephen	Member of the South Australian Legislative Council; 1839–1841; Served alongside: Multiple Members	Succeeded by George Grey; John A. Jackson
Political offices
New title	Colonial Secretary of South Australia; 1836 – 1837	Succeeded by Thomas B. Strangways
Preceded by George M. Stephen	Colonial Secretary of South Australia; 1839 – 1840; 1840 – 1841	Succeeded by George Hall as Acting Colonial Secretary
Preceded by George Hall as Acting Colonial Secretary	Colonial Secretary of South Australia; 1839 – 1840; 1840 – 1841	Succeeded by John A. Jackson
