= Thomas Bewes Strangways =

Australian politician

Thomas Bewes Strangways (23 July 1809 – 23 February 1859), generally called "Bewes Strangways" and "T. Bewes Strangways", was an explorer, early settler and Colonial Secretary of South Australia.

Strangways was the second son of Henry Bull Strangways of Shapwick, Somerset, England, and Elizabeth Bewes, sister of Thomas Bewes, MP for Plymouth.

He and his brother Giles E. Strangways arrived in the new colony on HMS Buffalo with Governor John Hindmarsh and he was engaged to one of Hindmarsh's daughters. However, they never married and Strangways later married Lavinia Albina née Fowler (c. 1810 – 22 October 1883). He sat on the Street Naming Committee, where Strangways Terrace, located in North Adelaide was named after him.

In November 1837, Strangways, Young Bingham Hutchinson, and a party explored the Fleurieu Peninsula and Lake Alexandrina region, searching for other outlets to the Southern Ocean. In the process, they "discovered" Currency Creek, which they named after the whale boat they were using, the Currency Lass.

He was the uncle of future Premier of South Australia, Henry Strangways. Giles E. Strangways, (an associate of John Finnis and Charles Sturt in their pioneering cattle drive of 1838), was his younger brother.

Strangways was a member of the South Australian Legislative Council and Colonial Secretary from 22 August 1837 to 12 July 1838.

Strangways died in Glenelg, South Australia or St. Leonard's on 23 February 1859, aged 49. His widow, an invalid, went to live with Henry Strangways, then with Mrs. B Clark at Childers Street, North Adelaide in an arrangement which has the appearance of protective custody. In 1865 her nephew, Mr. C Fowler, a Miss Fowler, and a sister-in-law Mrs Lorimer, sought a writ of habeas corpus against them, claiming that her family and friends had been denied access to her. As a result, Mrs Strangways was taken in Rounsevell's carriage to Mr Fowler's home "Elderslie" at Woodside, where she died some eighteen years later.

Parliament of South Australia
Preceded by Robert Gouger; John Jeffcott; Charles Mann	Member of the South Australian Legislative Council; 1837–1838; Served alongside: Multiple Members	Succeeded by George Gawler; George Stephen
Political offices
Preceded by Robert Gouger	Colonial Secretary of South Australia; 1837 – 1838	Succeeded by George Stephen
