= Exeter Racecourse =

Horse racing venue in Exeter, England

Coordinates: 50°38′28″N 3°33′29″W

Exeter
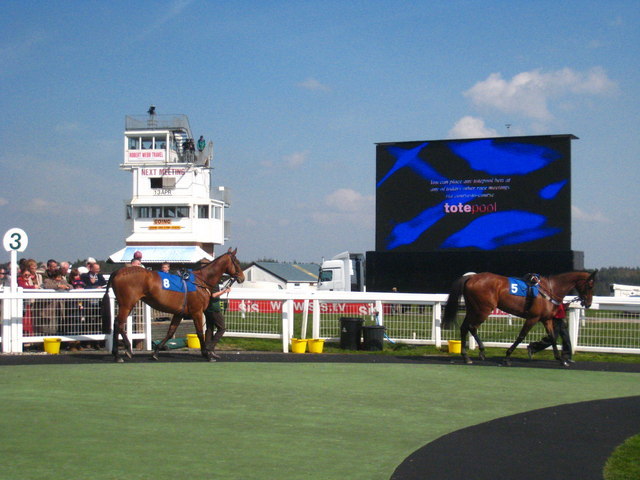
- Horses in the paddock at Exeter Racecourse
- Location: Exeter, Devon
- Owned by: Jockey Club Racecourses
- Screened on: Racing TV
- Course type: National Hunt
- Notable races: Haldon Gold Cup

Exeter Racecourse is a thoroughbred horse racing venue located near the city of Exeter, Devon, England. Locally it is known as Haldon racecourse because of its location on top of the Haldon Hills. At 850 feet (260 metres above sea level, it is the highest course in the UK. Until the early 1990s it was officially known as Devon and Exeter.

On 1 November 2005 racehorse Best Mate died at the course of a suspected heart attack whilst competing in the William Hill Haldon Gold Cup.

== History ==
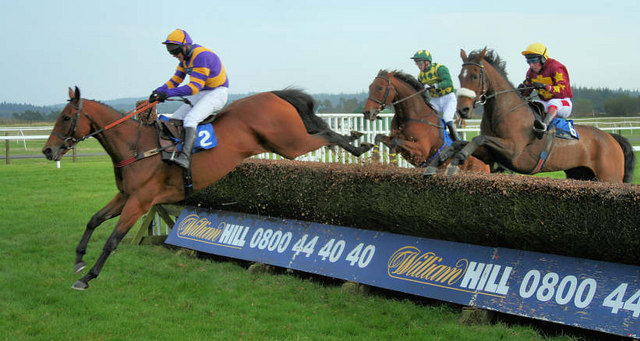
Horses jumping the final fence at the course

Horse racing has been part of Exeter's heritage since the middle of the 17th century, one of many racecourses created due to Charles II's love of the sport, and there have been claims that the racecourse is one of the oldest in the country. Horse racing rules were standardised after the Jockey Club was formed in 1750. A race was written about by Louisa Graves in 1819, and there were records of meetings at the course in 1804, probably earlier.

Devon and Exeter celebrated its bi-centenary on 8 October 1969, but there are records of racing at Haldon from 1738. In 1823, the course, which had been situated on common ground until the Enclosure Act, came into the ownership of Sir Lawrence Park (later Lord Haldon). He increased the number of racing days and the prize money. In 1826, for example, there were the Silver Tureen and Devonshire Stakes, won by horses owned by Lord Palmerston, there was a £100 purse put up by the City of Exeter and Ladies' Purse of £80. In May 1828, the 'Exeter and Plymouth Gazette' reported that, "The racecourse at Haldon is to be much improved previous to the next meeting. A race stand on an extended plan is being erected." A racecard of 1831 refers to an old and a new course.

Almost until 1900, Haldon continued as a flat racing venue, although hurdle races were run occasionally. Devon and Exeter steeplechases were set up in 1898 when the Haldon Race Club was formed.

In June 1904, in 'Devonia', the official publication of the United Devon Association, Cecil Clapp commented that, "While the county does not boast any large racemeeting, there is much genuine sport obtained in steeplechasing at Torquay, Newton, Totnes, Exeter (Haldon), Tiverton, South Molton, Plymouth, Devonport and other smaller towns."

The course was popular during the early 19th century, attracting entries from all over the country. By 1850, the popularity of National Hunt racing had waned and William White's gazetteer claimed that it was "little used". It popularity increased again over the following years, although there was a pause in racing during World War II. The course has been known variously as Haldon racecourse by locals due to its location, Devon and Exeter until the 1990s and more recently Exeter Racecourse.

In October 1972 there was an application to stage motor racing at the course, but it was turned down by Devon County Council.

=== Duel ===
The last duel in Devon occurred at the racecourse in 1833, when Peter Hennis, a doctor, and Sir John Jeffcott, a judge, drew pistols over Hennis spreading gossip. Hennis was wounded in the exchange, and died the following week; Jeffcott fled to Sierra Leone.

== Stand ==
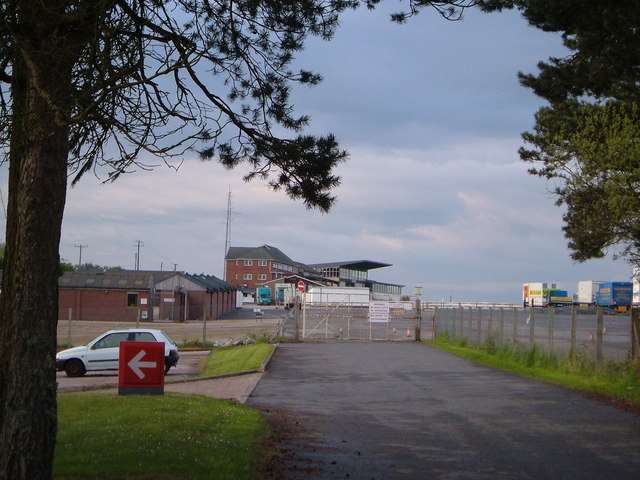
Stands at Exeter Racecourse

In 1911, a new grandstand was built at the cost of £1,000 (equivalent to £129,000 in 2023), designed by J. Archibald Lucas, designed to be 75 feet (23 m) long and 32 feet (9.8 m) deep, holding over 600 people, the majority of which would be under cover. The new stand was made of steel but with an iron roof, and held a bar, a weigh-room and other facilities as well as storage space.

By 2006, Exeter Racecourse included three stands, Haldon, Anstey and Brockman. The Haldon stand was opened by Anne, Princess Royal in 2004 and caters for the premier ticket holders, while the Anstey stand was opened by Lord Woodrow Wyatt in 1986. Upstairs in the Haldon stand, there is a gallery with seating to watch the races, and a bar named after Best Mate, as well as the Desert Orchid restaurant. For non-premier ticket holders, there is the Romany King bar, and burger van.

== Course ==
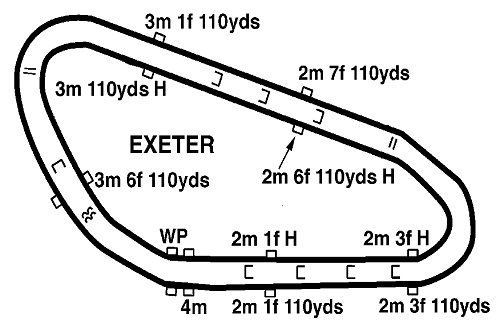
Course map

Exeter is an undulating right handed course of about two miles, flanked with heather and gorse bushes and set in superb countryside, six miles from Exeter. The original course was described as a "fine oval course of two miles", though in the 1850s an additional flat course was added, one mile long, making the total course length three miles. By the 1940s, the steeplechase matched the line of the original course. One lap of the course includes eleven fences, two of which are open ditches and one a water jump. The first part of the back straight is downhill, followed by a long climb which takes in four fences. The course then sweeps downhill into the home straight, which is uphill to the line. From the winning post, the ground falls round the first bend, where the water jump is taken. The course continues downhill over two more fences, including an open ditch before a brief climb to the back straight.

== Notable races ==
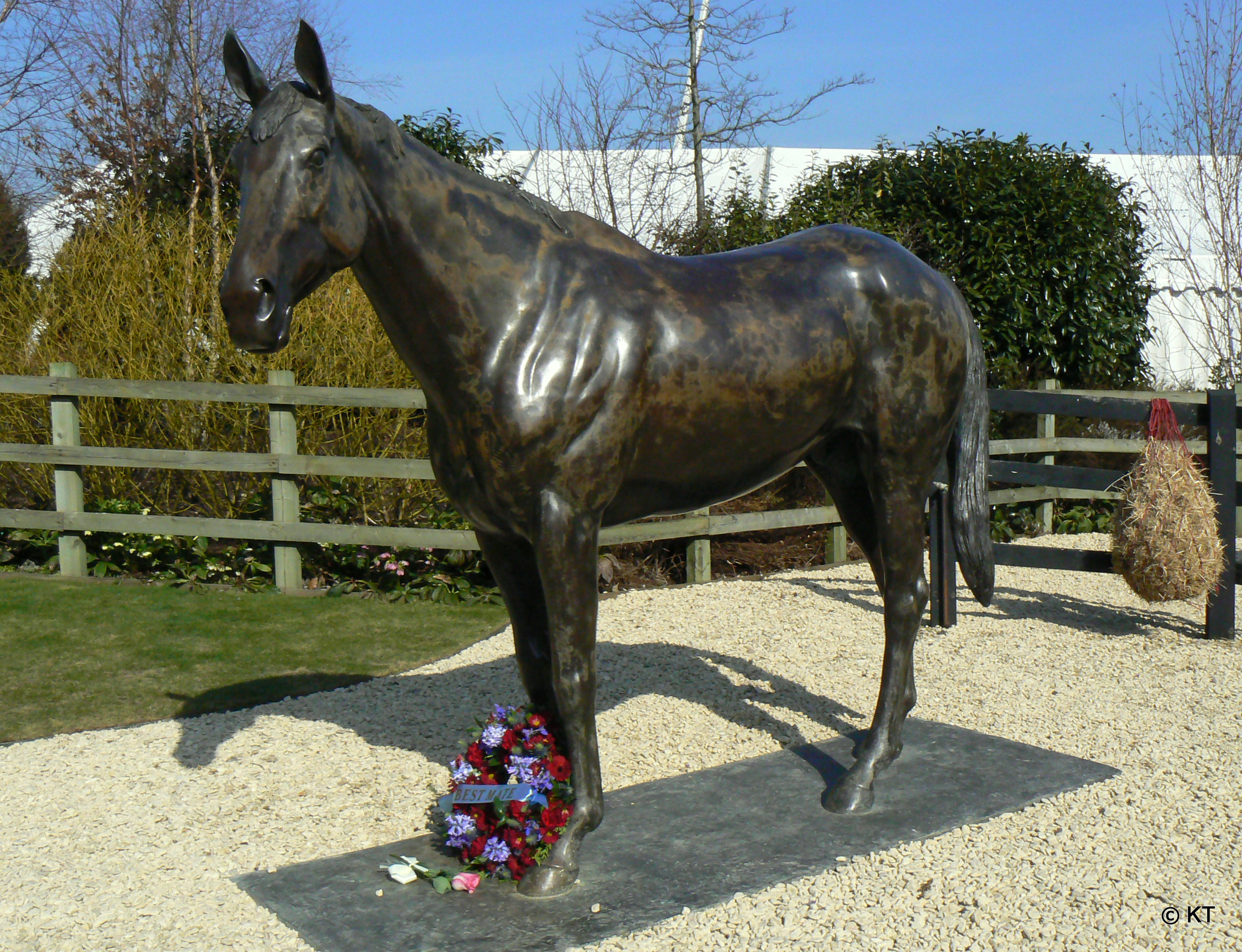
Best Mate, a triple Cheltenham Gold Cup winner, which died on the course in 2005

The course has historically had a Gold Cup race, which was won in 1807 by Lord Charles Somerset's horse, Bagatelle, sire of Sir Peter Teazle. There have also been special races in the 1810s to focus on three-year-old thoroughbreds foaled in the West Country. Presently the best known race is the Haldon Gold Cup, held in November. In 2005 the three-time winner of the Cheltenham Gold Cup, Best Mate, collapsed and died of a suspected heart attack after its jockey pulled up during the race.

Charity races at the course have included jockeys riding Clydesdale horses in aid of Devon Air Ambulance in 2013, and Dartmoor ponies in aid of Cancer Research UK in 2014.

Month	Day	Race name	Type	Grade	Distance	Age/Sex
November	Friday	Haldon Gold Cup	Chase	Grade 2	2m 1½f	4yo +

== Caravan site ==
During the summer the Caravan and Motorhome Club run a caravan site in the grounds of the racecourse.
