= Osmond Gilles =

Australian politician

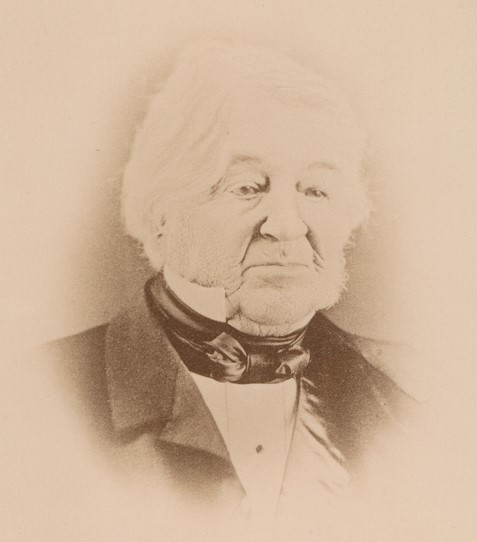

Treasurer of South Australia
- In office 28 December 1836 – 1 October 1839
- Governor: Sir John Hindmarsh
- Preceded by: office established
- Succeeded by: John Jackson

Personal details
- Born: Osmond Gilles; 24 August 1788 London, England
- Died: 25 September 1866 (aged 78) Glen Osmond, South Australia
- Spouse: Patience Oakden
- Occupation: Grazier, landowner

Osmond Gilles (24 August 1788 – 25 September 1866) was a settler, pastoralist, mine owner and the Colony of South Australia’s first colonial treasurer.

Born in London of Huguenot descent, in 1816 he went into partnership with Philip Oakden in Hamburg, Germany as a merchant, where in 1825 he married Patience Oakden, Philip's sister. They returned to England, where his wife died in 1833. They had no children, and Gilles never remarried, but took on several protegees, including his nephew John Jackson Oakden. Gilles was struck by Robert Gouger, the first Colonial Secretary, leading to the latter's suspension.

Gilles migrated to the new Australian colony on HMS Buffalo in 1836 accompanied by his ward Emily Blunden (referred to as Blundell on the passenger list), sister of Dr John Blunden, and acted as the Colonial Treasurer. He was a prominent businessman and land owner, with the largest holdings of any settler in 1837. He was, with his secretary William Finke, and a few others, the fortunate ticket-holder in the ballot for the purchase of city acres at Glenelg, of which he took full advantage. He sat on the Street Naming Committee on 23 May 1837. Gilles was a major benefactor, and at times sustained the colony's treasury with his own funds.

== Named for Gilles ==
- Gilles Street in the Adelaide central business district
- Gilles Arcade, off Currie Street, site of the Queen's Theatre
- Glen Osmond Road
- O.G. Hotel, Gilles Plains, founded 1843 and still operating
- O.G. Road, a major thoroughfare through the suburb of Klemzig adjacent and much later than the O.G. Hotel
- O.G., a cutter built in Glenelg 1840
- Osmond Terrace, a major thoroughfare through the suburbs of Norwood and Fullarton. (Osmond Road, Marion was named for Harry Osmond, a local businessman.)
- Adelaide suburbs of Glen Osmond and Gilles Plains. A new suburb formed from a portion of Gilles Plains has been named Oakden after Gilles' wife.
- Gilleston Park on the Gilles Plains and farmed by Dr. John Blunden,
- Gilleston, now part of Balhannah
- Lake Gilles which is located in the north of Eyre Peninsula was named after Gilles by the British explorer, Edward John Eyre, in 1839.

== See also ==
- French Australians
- French British
