= John Ellis (pastoralist) =

Australian politician (c.1803–1873)

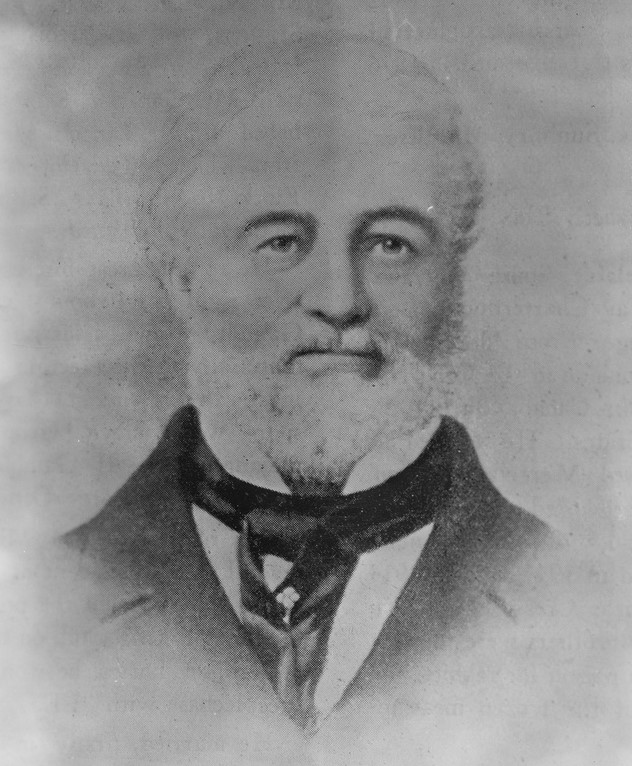

John Ellis (c. 1803 – 22 March 1873) generally known as "Captain Ellis", was a pastoralist and businessman prominent in the early days of South Australia.

== Biography ==
Ellis was born c. 1803, to Sarah and Thomas Ellis, a clergyman of the Church of England.

He arrived in South Australia from England on the Buckinghamshire on 22 March 1839, listed as "Captain Ellis", though on what basis it is not known, and in company of his brother George Ellis.

In July 1839, he and his longtime friend Captain William Allen purchased two thirds of "Milner Estate" near Port Gawler from George Milner Stephen, the misrepresentation of which transaction was to haunt Stephen in later years. In 1855, he purchased Allen's share. This area includes the land later known as Buckland Park, which he sold to J. H. Browne and Col. P. J. Browne in 1856. He took up the nearby Hummocks run in 1842, and Barabba, north-east of Mallala, South Australia, in August 1844.

He bought land in New Zealand.

Starting in 1851, he purchased over 50,000 freehold acres in the Hundreds of Benara and Blanche, between Mount Gambier and Port MacDonnell and 34 square miles of leasehold land, where he ran some 73,000 sheep, He purchased the remainder of Benara (originally spelled Benaira) and an adjacent station, Coola comprising 22,000 acres of freehold and 36,000 acres of leasehold, from the South Australian Company in 1875.

=== Managers ===
The general manager of most of his properties, and largely responsible for his good fortune, was Hugh Cameron (c. May 1796 – 10 June 1884). Born in the Braes of Rannoch, Scotland, he is reported as arriving in South Australia early in 1838, but perhaps arrived on the Thomas Harrison 25 February 1839, or the Lady Bute 18 June 1839. The Hundred of Cameron was named for him.

Another significant employee was J. C. Kennedy (c. 1827 – 10 October 1897), from the same part of Scotland, who managed the Benara and Coola properties for him, then for his son T. C. Ellis.

== Politics ==
In June 1851, he accepted the petition of a number of electors for the seat of Flinders in the reconstituted Legislative Council, and in August 1851 became one of the first sixteen elected parliamentarians in South Australia.

== Retirement and death ==
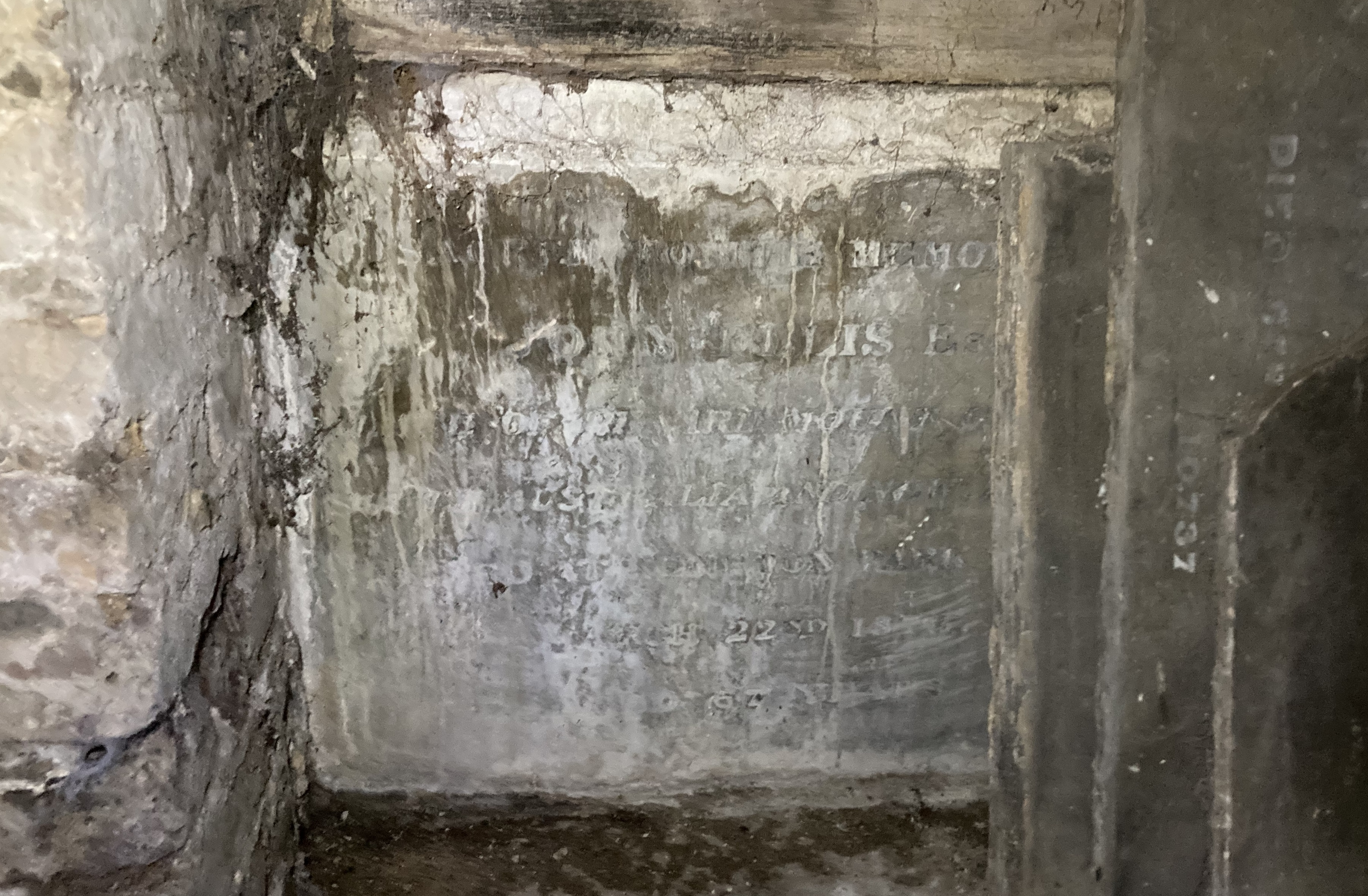
Loculus of John Ellis (pastoralist) in the Terrace Catacombs of Highgate Cemetery

Having made a considerable fortune in South Australia, he retired with his wife Elizabeth and family back to England. His son Thomas took over his estates, and his children in turn continued to run Benara and Coola into the 20th Century. He died on 22 March 1873 in Kempton Park, Middlesex, England, at the age of 69, and was interred in Bay 49 (burial no.19275) of the Terrace Catacombs of Highgate Cemetery. The Cemetery recorded his age as sixty six.

== Family ==
Ellis' first wife, Elizabeth Jane White Cathery born in 1819 in Longfleet, Dorset. Over the 18 years of their marriage, they had 11 children.

His second wife Susan Hindmarsh, daughter of Sir John Hindmarsh, was born on 29 December 1810 in Rochester, Kent. She married John ELLIS on 9 November 1864 in Cotmanhay, Derbyshire and died on 24 August 1882 in Middlesex at the age of 71.

A brother Thomas Ellis (c. 1808 – 12 May 1841) arrived in Adelaide aboard Lord Glenelg on 10 May 1841 and died shortly after.
