= Robert Bernard =

Robert Bernard may refer to:

- Bob Bernard (1961–2007), American IT executive
- Sir Robert Bernard, 1st Baronet (1601–1666), English lawyer and politician
- Sir Robert Bernard, 3rd Baronet (died c. 1703), MP for Huntingdonshire and High Sheriff of Cambridgeshire and Huntingdonshire
- Sir Robert Bernard, 5th Baronet (c. 1740–1789), MP for Huntingdonshire and Westminster
- Robert Bernard (advocate-general) (c. 1808–1840), lawyer and parliamentarian in South Australia
- Robert J. Bernard (1894–1981), American academic administrator and president of the Claremont Colleges
- Robert Bernard (footballer) (1913–1990), German footballer
- Rocky Bernard (born 1979), American football defensive tackle
- Robert Bernard Martin (1918–1999), American scholar and biographer who also wrote as Robert Bernard

== See also ==
- Bernard baronets
- Bernard (surname)
