= John Alexander Jackson =

Australian politician

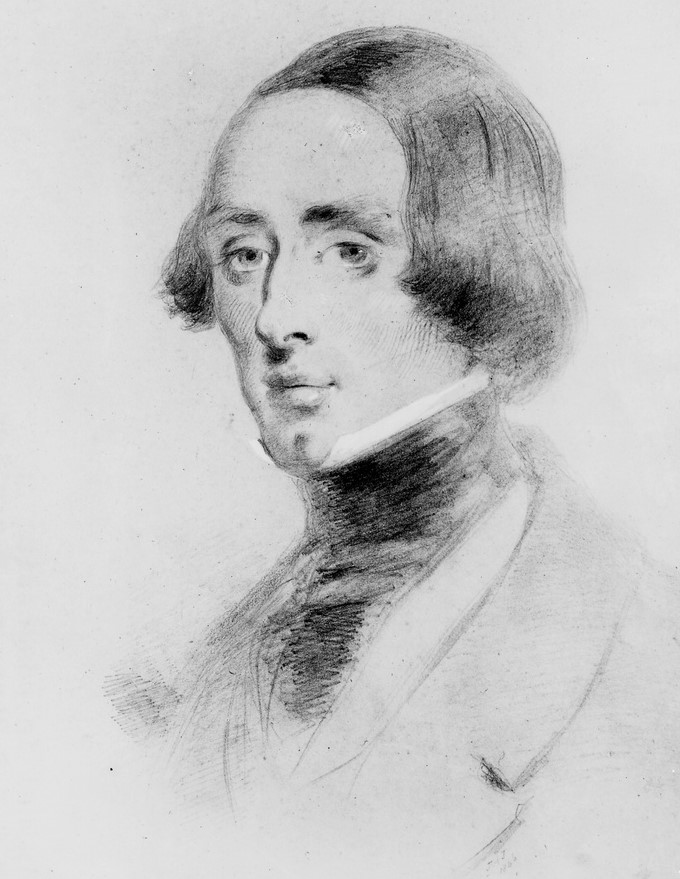

John Alexander Jackson (1809 – 25 May 1885) was a public servant, colonial agent in pre-Federation Australia and Treasurer of South Australia.

Jackson was the son of John Serocold Jackson, a major in the 72nd Regiment. The family migrated to Sydney, New South Wales in July 1825. J.A. Jackson was employed as a draughtsman in the Surveyor-General's Department on a salary of £100. After apparently visiting England, he arrived in Launceston aboard the David Owen in June 1831. He owned two large farms, and in 1833, became the editor of John Pascoe Fawkner's Launceston Advertiser.

Jackson was recommended by Sir John Franklin to the Government of South Australia, and was Treasurer in the early days of that colony and Colonial Secretary (succeeding Mr. Robert Gouger) from October 1841 to June 1843, when he resigned owing to a difference with the governor of the colony, Captain (later Sir) George Grey. Jackson was a nominated member of the South Australian Legislative Council. Returning to Tasmania, he went to London as the official representative of the anti-transportation movement, and contributed towards the success of the agitation for granting responsible government to the Australian colonies by his letters to Earl Grey. It was due to an intimation received from Jackson whilst in London in 1849 that the people of Port Phillip District became aware of the intention of the imperial authorities to despatch a batch of convicts to their settlement. They were thus enabled to initiate the opposition which was successful in preventing Victoria becoming a convict colony. Later on Jackson resided in Melbourne as general manager of the English, Scottish, and Australian Chartered Bank, a post which he held till replaced by Mr. (later Sir) George Verdon in 1872. Mr. Jackson married a daughter of the late W. G. Walker, of Vron Estate, Bishopsbourne, Tasmania, and died at Ealing, near London, in May 1885.

South Australian Legislative Council
Preceded by George Gawler; Robert Gouger; Charles Mann	Member of the South Australian Legislative Council; 1841–1843; Served alongside: Multiple Members	Succeeded by John Morphett; Thomas S. O'Halloran; Alfred Mundy
Political offices
New title	Treasurer of South Australia; 1839 – 1841	Vacant Title next held by James W. MacDonald
Preceded by Robert Gouger	Colonial Secretary of South Australia; 1841 – 1843	Succeeded by Alfred Mundy
