= Giles E. Strangways =

Pioneer settler of South Australia (1819–1906)

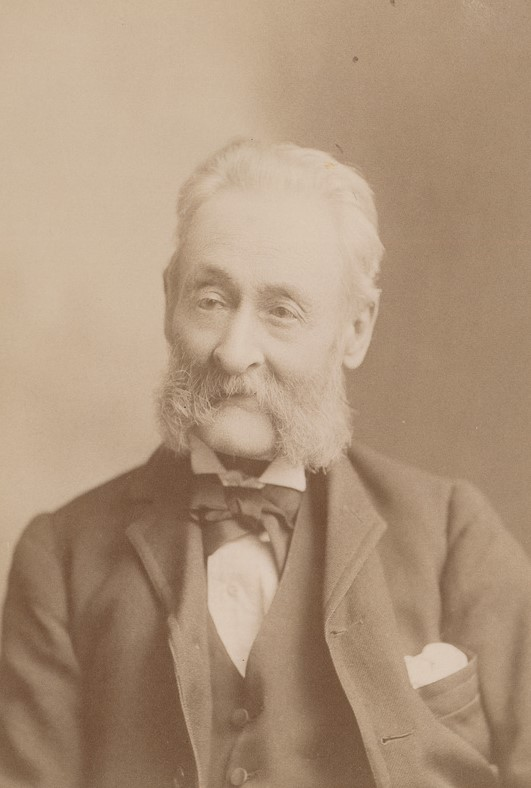

Giles Edward Strangways (1819 – 24 February 1906) was a pioneer of the British colony of South Australia, an associate of John Finnis and Charles Sturt. He was a brother of Thomas Bewes Strangways and an uncle of H. B. T. Strangways, a Premier of South Australia.

Giles Strangways was born in Shapwick, Somerset, England, the fourth son of Henry Bull Strangways (died 1829), Colonel-Commandant of the Polden Hills Militia, and Elizabeth Bewes, sister of Thomas Bewes, MP for Plymouth.

Giles Strangways was among the earliest purchasers of South Australia land, and emigrated on HMS Buffalo, along with his brother T. Bewes Strangways, with Captain John Hindmarsh in the First Fleet of South Australia, and was present at the proclamation of the province in 1836.

In 1838 he accompanied Charles Sturt and John Finnis on their overland cattle drive from Sydney to Adelaide, following the River Murray. Later in the same year he accompanied Sturt in his abortive attempt to pass through the Murray Mouth.

By 1856 Giles was living at Port Elliot, advertising his services as a surveyor. By 1872 he was working for the Government Survey Department.

He died at his home at 45 Maesbury Street, Kensington.

== Family ==
Henry Bull Strangways (1779 – 1829) married Elisheba Bewes (c. 1782 – 29 October 1858) in 1807. Their children included:

- Henry Bull Strangways (8 March 1808 – 8 April 1884)

- Henry Bull Templar Strangways (1832 – 10 February 1920). He was Premier of South Australia November 1868 - May 1870
- Cordelia Strangways ( – 4 January 1907)

- T(homas) Bewes Strangways (23 July 1809 – 23 February 1859) married Lavinia Albina Fowler (c. 1810 – 22 October 1883)
- Capt. Ludlow Edmund Strangways, R.N. (c. 1816 – 9 July 1890) was married to Mabel Strangways ( – 29 September 1916)

- only son Edmond Henry Giles Strangways (1913–1992) married Mary Alice Smallacombe ( ) on 22 June 1940. lived 45 Maesbury, divorced 1951. She married again, to John Clarence "Clarry" Neate on 17 July 1954.

- Giles E(dward) Strangways (1819 – 24 February 1906) married Kate Jane ( – c. 9 September 1914)

- eldest son George Strangways ( – 8 June 1924)
- second daughter Alice Strangways ( – 24 February 1919)
- third daughter Cordelia Strangways (26 February 1854 – 12 August 1886)
- fourth daughter Helen Matilda "Minnie" Strangways (c. 1860 – 3 July 1901) married Edward Kelly ( – ) on 28 October 1891
- youngest daughter Adelina Harriet Maria ( – 27 January 1870)

- Lieut.-General George Strangways (c. 1821 – 1 December 1904) was married to Hamilton Dunbar Strangways ( – 10 January 1885)
