= Young Hutchinson =

Young Hutchinson may refer to:

- Tim Hutchinson (born 1949), American politician and lobbyist
- Young Bingham Hutchinson (1806–1870), British military officer, explorer and settler

== See also ==
- Jeremy Young Hutchinson (born 1974), American politician and convicted felon
