= HMS Buffalo (1813) =

Royal Navy storeship (1813–1840)

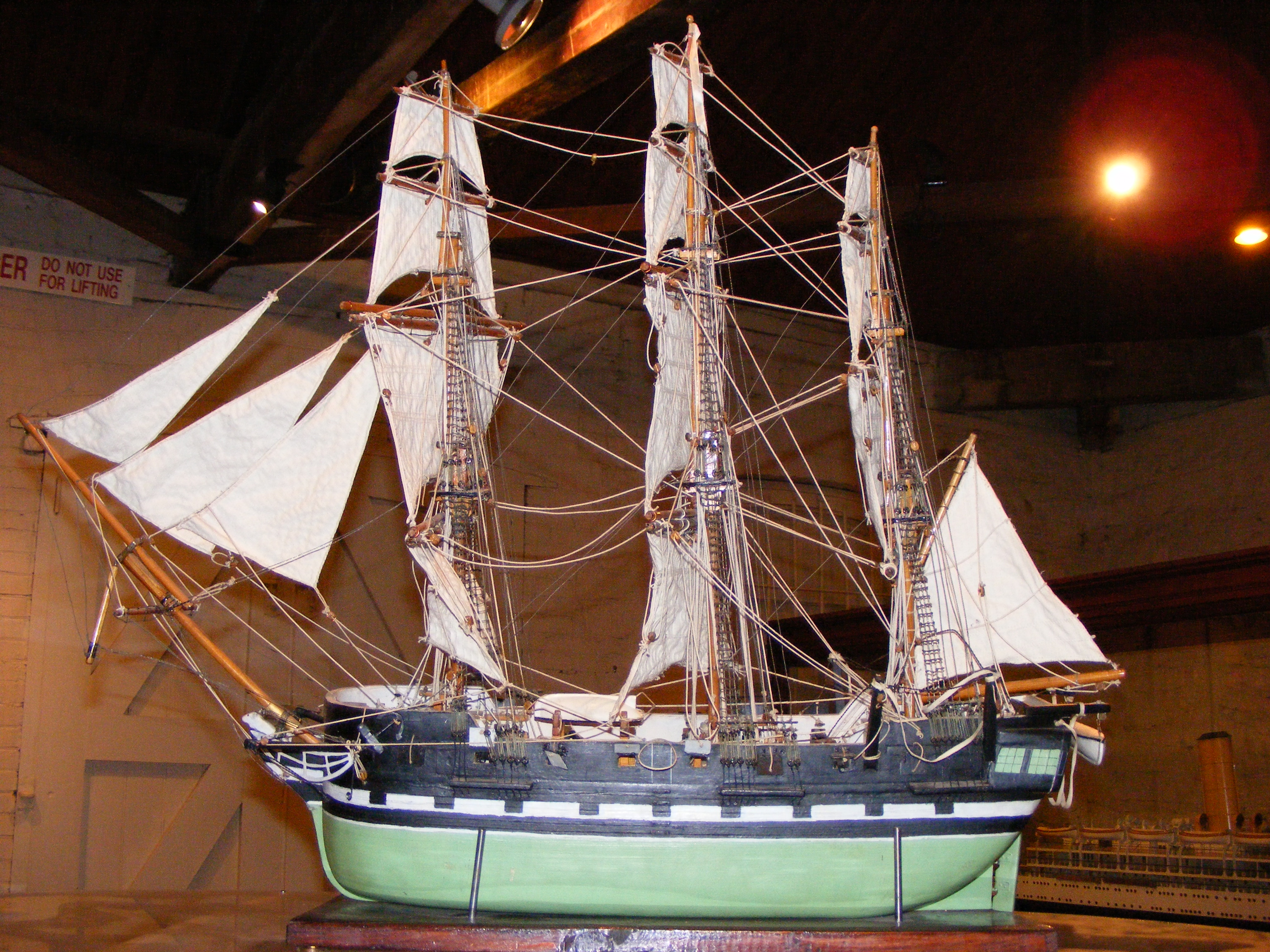
- 1936 model of Buffalo

History

United Kingdom
- Name: HMS Buffalo
- Builder: James Bonner & James Horsburgh, Sulkea
- Launched: 4 January 1813 as Hindostan
- Acquired: 22 October 1813 by Royal Navy
- Refit: 4 January 1814, as a storeship; 19 April 1833, as a convict ship; 1836, as an emigrant ship
- Fate: Wrecked in Mercury Bay, 28 July 1840.

General characteristics
- Class & type: sixth-rate storeship
- Tons burthen: 589, or 670 (bm)
- Length: 120 ft (37 m) (o/a); 98 ft 8 7/8 in (30.1 m) (keel)
- Beam: 33 ft 6 in (10.21 m)
- Depth of hold: 15 ft 8 in (4.78 m)
- Propulsion: Sail
- Sail plan: Full-rigged ship
- Complement: Original: 3 officers and 55 crew; Later: 9 officers and 88 crew
- Armament: As commissioned: 16 × 24-pounder carronades + 2 × 9-pounder guns; After 1833 convict ship refit: 6 × 18-pounder carronades + 2 × 6-pounder long guns
- Notes: Water buffalo figurehead

HMS Buffalo was a storeship of the Royal Navy, originally built and launched at Sulkea, opposite Calcutta, in 1813 as the merchant vessel Hindostan. The Admiralty purchased her that year after she arrived in Britain. She later transported convicts and immigrants to Australia, before being wrecked in 1840.

== Launch and purchase ==
Hindostan was built of teak by James Bonner and James Horsburgh, of Firth, in 1813 at Sulkea, on the Hoogly near Calcutta. The Calcutta Gazette, reporting on her launch, described her as a merchantman built to carry grain rice. Her hull was pierced at the upper deck to be able to carry 20 guns, and she measured about 578 tons burthen.

In August 1813, after a six-month maiden voyage, Hindostan arrived in the East India Docks, London to discharge and was offered for sale. She had left Bengal on 18 February, passed the Point de Galle on 13 March, stopped at St Helena on 9 June, and arrived at The Downs on 10 August.

The Lords Commissioners of the Admiralty purchased her on 22 October. David Webster, representing the builders, brokered the sale price of £18,000 for Hindostan. The Navy Board renamed her HMS Buffalo, designated her a sixth rate, and employed her as a storeship.

The Navy Board also purchased the similar Severn (550 tons burthen), that it renamed HMS Camel. Horsburgh had part-financed the building of both Severn and Hindostan in the partnership of Horsburgh & Colman.

== Royal Navy service ==
Buffalo was commissioned in November 1813 under Mr. Richard Anderson, Master, and became a ship of many uses and refits. Anderson was still her master between 1814 and 1815 when she was stationed at the Army Depot at Bermuda. On 25 December 1814, she departed Falmouth and arrived at Port Royal on 11 February 1815, having been part of a larger convoy with Swiftsure (1804) as its flagship. (Note: 'A fleet of about 230 sail, under convoy of the Swiftsure of 74 guns, Capt. Adderley... [including the] Buffalo store-ship, of 20 guns, Mr. Anderson, master [set sail from the Solent on 2 December 1814]... On the 1st inst. the fleet arrived off Barbados... The Forward [escorted] those [vessels destined] for this port [and arrived at Port Royal on 11 February 1815, as recorded on page 17.]')

On 6 June 1815, she arrived at Plymouth, and sailed to Portsmouth the next day. Then in January 1816 Mr. W. Hudson became master.

She departed Woolwich, stopping off at Deal on 26 March 1816, destined for Bermuda, where she arrived on 5 May. On 23 May 1816, she was at Bermuda, where she embarked Dockyard workers associated with HMS Pactolus via HMS Ruby. On 30 May 1816, she arrived at Halifax. On 5 July 1816, she departed Halifax and arrived at Spithead on 26 July 1816.

Buffalo was at Deptford in 1822, 1827, and 1831. She was fitted as a timber carrier to carry spars from New Zealand in 1831. However, she apparently was in the Quarantine Service at Stangate in 1832.

Then in January 1833 she was fitted as a convict ship, and F.W.R. Sadler took command. Buffalo sailed to Australia 12 May 1833 and arrived on 5 October 1833. She carried 180 female convicts, one of whom died on the journey.

Buffalo was an important ship in the maritime history of South Australia, serving at times as a quarantine, transport or colonisation ship, while also aiding the British expansion into New Zealand, New South Wales, Tasmania, and Upper Canada. Sadler received gifts from the local Maori chief of Tītore in the Bay of Islands during one of HMS Buffalo's trips. The gifts included a pin, a club, and an ornate Hei-tiki, all now in the British Museum.

Buffalo was paid-off and recommissioned in January 1835. Then James Wood took command in July 1836. On 23 July 1836, as the main ship of the First Fleet of South Australia, Buffalo sailed from Portsmouth, and was the last to arrive in South Australian waters on 24 December of that year. She carried 176 colonists, including Captain John Hindmarsh, who was to become the first Governor of the new colony of South Australia following the proclamation of that colony on 28 December 1836. Other passengers on HMS Buffalo to South Australia in 1836 included: James Cock, Robert Cock (James father), William Ferguson, Osmond Gilles, Charles Beaumont Howard, Young Bingham Hutchinson, and brothers Giles E. Strangways, Thomas Bewes Strangways and Frank Potts (winemaker).

Only three deaths were ever recorded on Buffalo, a remarkable record considering the medical practices of that period and the number of passengers she transported.

S. Hindmarsh may have been captain in 1837 but James Wood returned to command and would remain her captain until her loss. Wood sailed Buffalo to Quebec with 300 soldiers as reinforcements for the British forces dealing with the Rebellions of 1837 there.

Charles Morgan Lewis, who had captained the schooner Isabella on her mission to rescue survivors of Charles Eaton from the Torres Strait Islands, is recorded as having travelled as a passenger on Buffalo with the young orphan William D'Oyly, who had survived the wreck and subsequent massacre, back to London from Sydney Cove, departing on 13 May 1838.

On 28 September 1839 she sailed from Quebec with 82 American patriots and 58 French prisoners from Lower Canada who were convicts and part of the Upper Canada Rebellion in 1838. On 12 October a conspiracy to murder the ship's crew was attempted, but was discovered, and the rebels secured. The mutiny was reported in the Morning Chronicle on 22 November, and much later in the Sydney Herald on 22 April 1840. The Americans were transported to Hobart, Tasmania and the French convicts were brought to Sydney.

She was fitted as a timber carrier again in 1839.

== Fate ==
Buffalo was anchored in Mercury Bay off Whitianga and loaded with Kauri spars when a storm on 28 July 1840 wrecked her. The gale parted her from her cables. When it became clear that her crew could not save her, Wood steered her onto the beach. All the crew except two were saved, but she herself was a total loss.

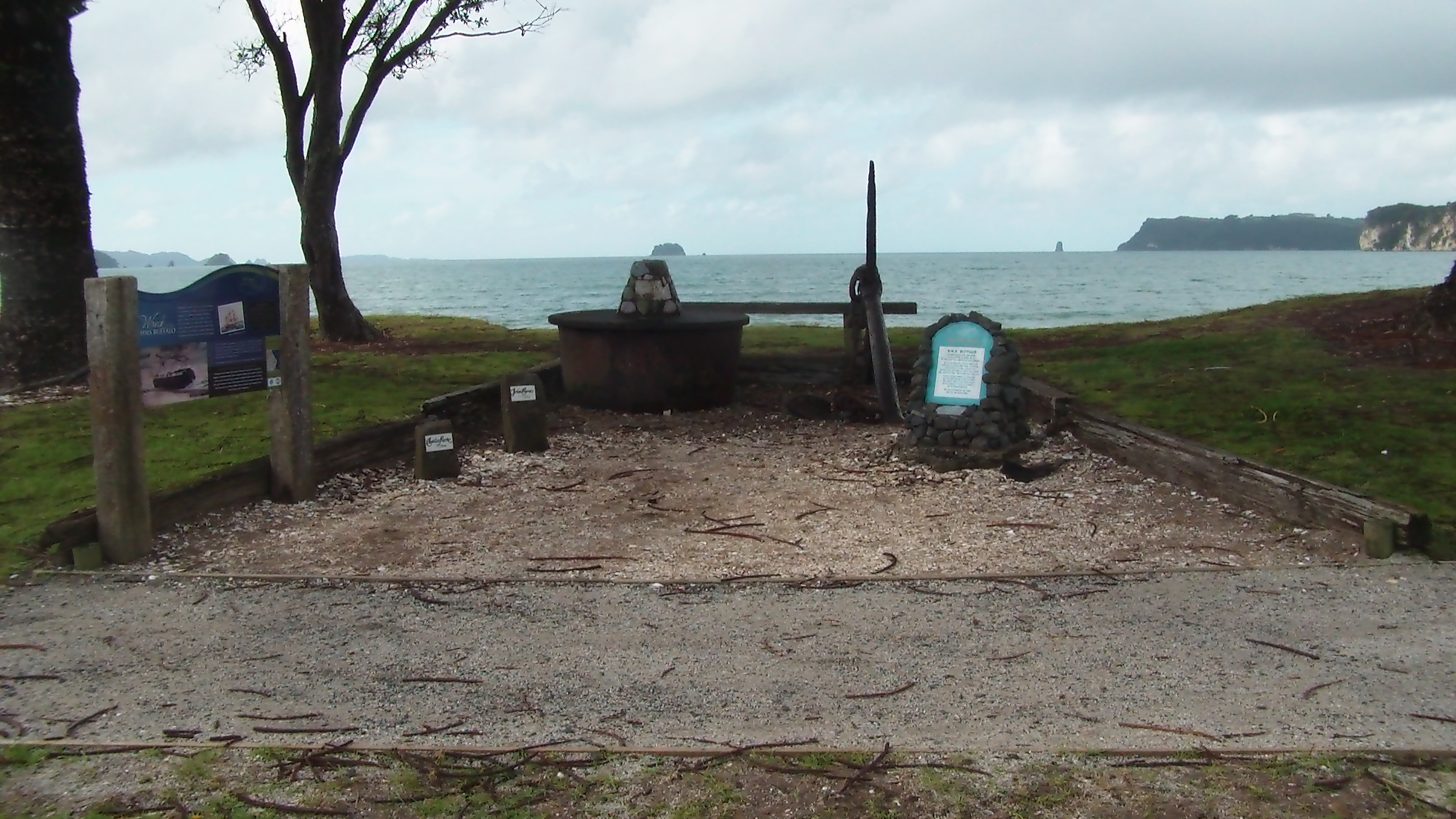
The memorial for HMS Buffalo located at Buffalo Beach, Whitianga.

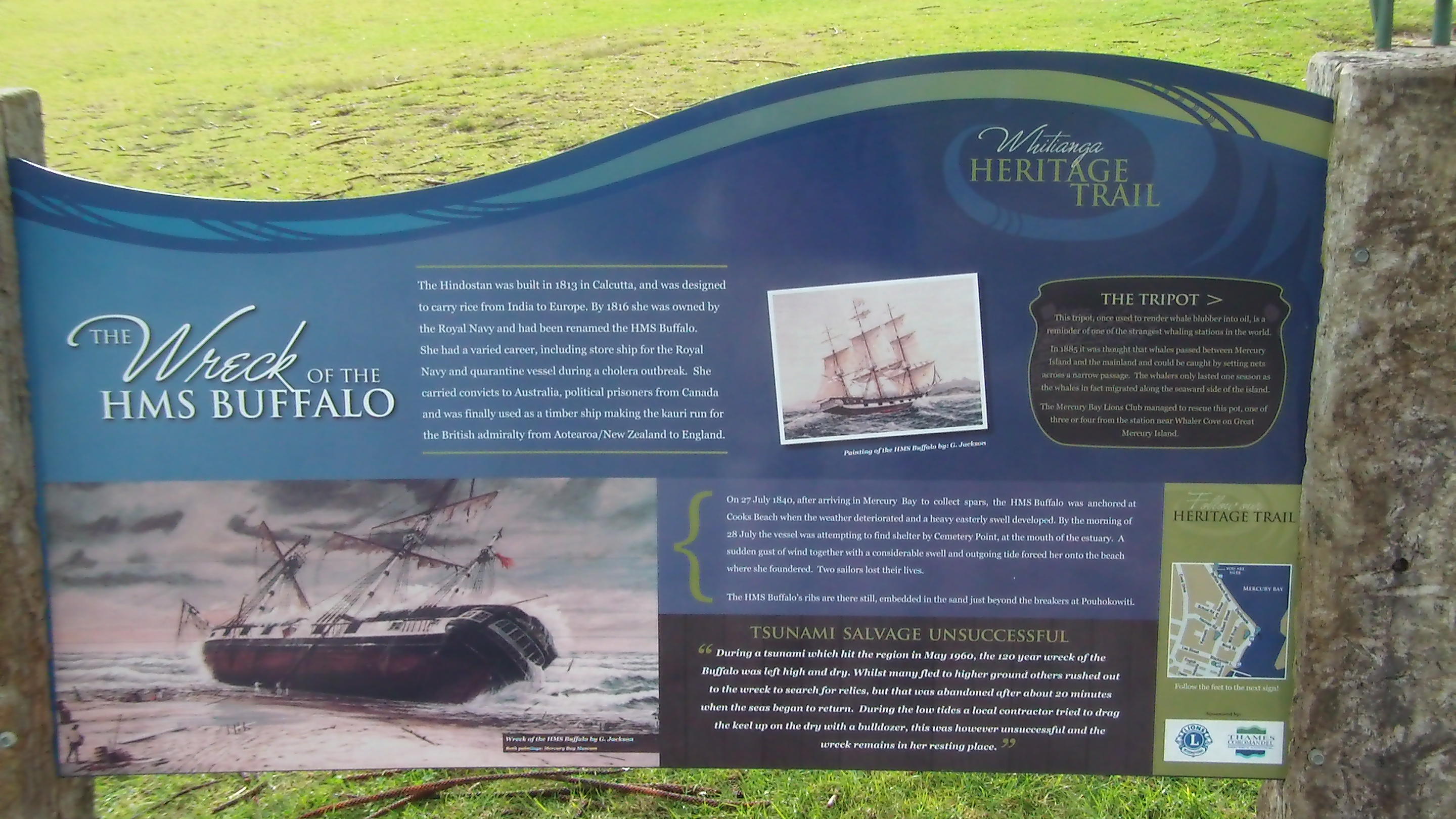
The sign next to HMS Buffalo Memorial

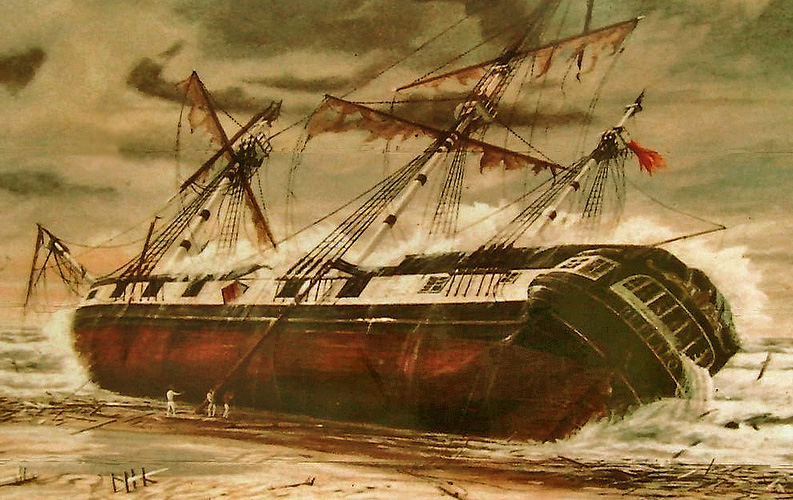
The Wreck of the HMS Buffalo, by G. Jackson

== Post-script ==
The tsunami of 22 May 1960 briefly exposed the wreck as water retreated. People who ran out to see it had to retreat again as the sea level returned to normal.

A team of maritime archaeologists and volunteer divers led by the South Australian Government's State Heritage Branch relocated the wreck site in April 1986. The team had to excavate through sand to then record the wreck. They completed several trenches and reported bad visibility when trying to record the hull remains.

Occasionally, the wreck of HMS Buffalo is still visible at Buffalo Beach off Whitianga, however, it is only visible from the air at low tide and in clear water conditions. The GPS co-ordinates for the location of the wreck are 36°49′36.20″S 175°42′20.0″E.

In 2009 the Deployable Hydrographic Survey Unit of the Royal New Zealand Navy located the wreck using side-scan sonar and dived on the wreck using snorkels. Much of the wreck has been broken up by storms with the remaining timbers of the hull still in solid condition despite over 150 years in the ocean. The wreck has been charted by Land Information New Zealand.

In 2018, materials from the wreck site held in the Mercury Bay Museum underwent archaeological recording and contributed to understanding how the vessel was constructed.

Since the 1986 archaeological excavation, the site hadn't been visited by professional maritime archaeologists. Until archaeologists dived it in 2019 and found all the sand naturally protecting the wreck as seen in 1986 had been scoured out. The archaeologists, in discussion with the Mercury Bay Museum, identified the wreck site was at risk of rapid degradation while presenting an opportunity to complete a comprehensive archaeological survey. In response, the volunteer-led HMS Buffalo Re-examination Project was established with the Australasian Institute for Maritime Archaeology's Scholarship, supported by Heritage New Zealand Pouhere Taonga (HNZPT) and financial support from Whitianga businesses. The Project, through education and archaeological survey, promoted maritime archaeology and the vessel's history, both locally and nationally.

On 12 March 2021 twelve volunteer divers spent two days surveying and recording the wreck structure. Data was combined to produce the first ever complete site plan. Under archaeological authority (2021/395) from HNZPT, ship components were sampled for analysis. Preliminary results revealed the types of resources used in the construction of an early nineteenth century British colonial vessel. The achievements of the project were recognized in 2022 with receiving the New Zealand Archaeological Association Public Archaeology Award and in 2023 with the Australasian Society for Historical Archaeology Award for Best Public Archaeology Initiative

Following the March 2021 underwater archaeological survey, several storms and cyclones have changed the seabed topography. Notably, the wreck was dived again in August 2021 and found to have sand redeposited across the site. Only some planking and frames were visible. The increased storm activity, however, has seen disarticulated remains wash ashore and reported by locals. The local community is encouraged to contact the museum whenever they find a piece so the material can be professionally recorded and considered for conservation treatment.

In June 2023, the 3D model of the shipwreck site as surveyed in 2021 was released. It shows the shipwreck exposed from bow to stern. Individual ship components are also visible. The model is available to view on SketchFab (https://sketchfab.com/3d-models/hms-buffalo-shipwreck-4c171a9f2bca4bea906746564a29eeab) and was produced in association with New Zealand Geographic and Live Ocean Foundation.

The HMS Buffalo shipwreck is a recorded archaeological site (T11/562) and is protected under the Heritage New Zealand Pouhere Taonga Act 2014.

== Replica ==
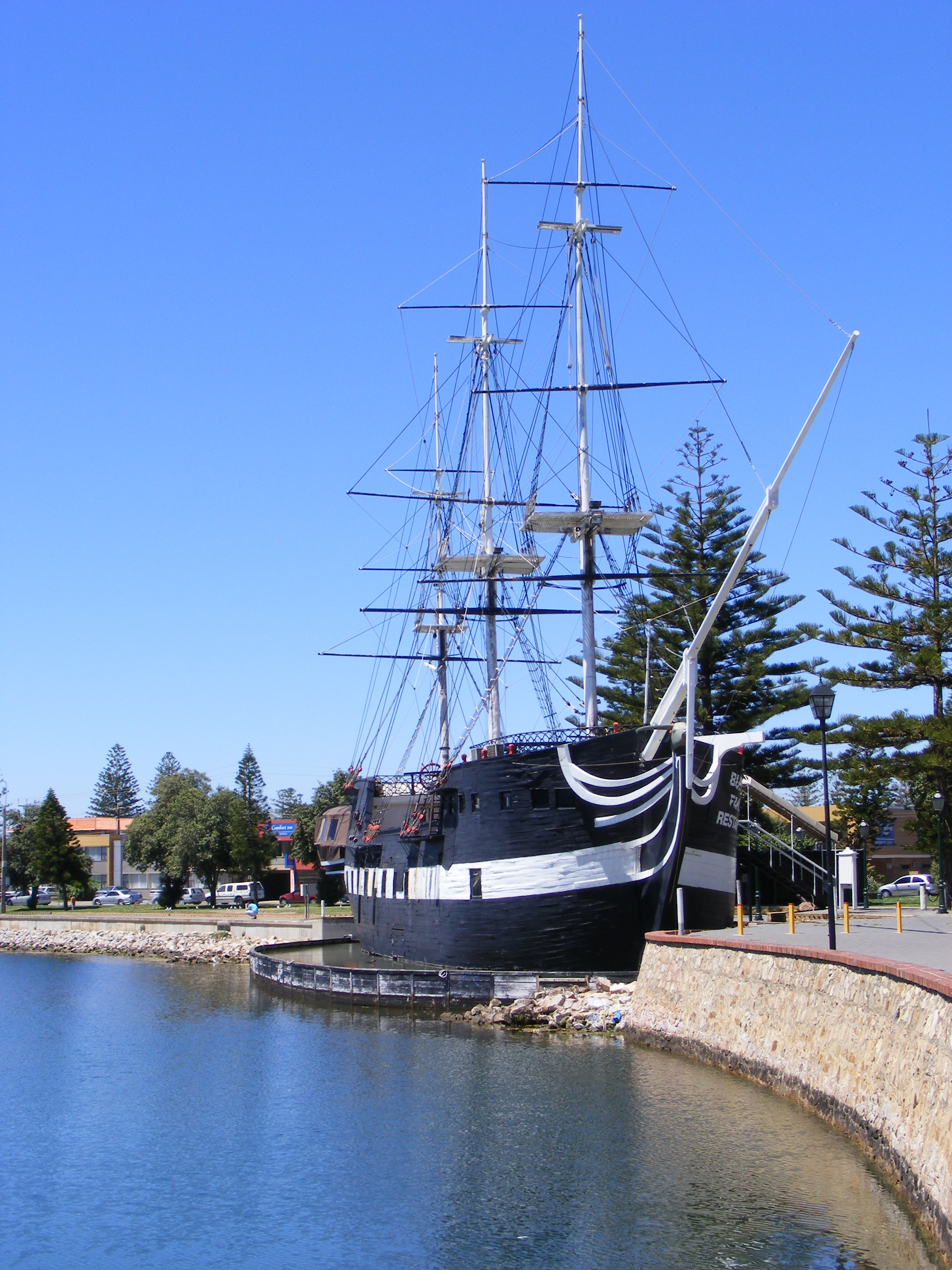
The 1980 replica of HMS Buffalo

As a tribute, a static replica of Buffalo was built in 1980 on the shore of the Patawalonga River at Glenelg, a suburb of Adelaide, as a restaurant and museum. It was based on the original Admiralty specifications and plans, with some internal modifications (eg higher clear deck height). After a period of financial difficulties, the venture was closed and the vessel deteriorated. Despite large-scale redevelopment plans the City of Holdfast Bay announced in January 2019 that the replica would be demolished.
