= O.G. Hotel =

Coordinates: 34°52′30.2″S 138°37′57.2″E

The O.G. Hotel is one of Adelaide's oldest hotels, noted for its enigmatic name, the shortest in Australia.

== History ==
The O.G. Hotel gained its licence before 1846, according to one reference on 6 July 1843, the proprietor being James Black.

Situated at Gilles Plains on what was then known as the road to Modbury (now designated as 246 North East Road, Klemzig), the name is generally recognised as a reference to Osmond Gilles, a major land holder in the area, though mention of this connection did not appear until the 20th century.

O.G. Road which runs alongside the hotel, does not appear in print until 1869, so it appears to have been named after the hotel.

== Licensees ==
- 1843–1850 James Black
- 1850–1880 Edwin Bayfield
- 1880–1890 William Gardener
- 1890–1891 James W. Tunstall
- 1891–1892 Alfred A. Hams
- 1892–1914 James A. Musson
- 1914–1920 Frank J. Heading
- 1920 George J. Cook
- 1920–1946 Edgar Stanley Rush
- 1946–?? A. Gordon Miller and Phoebe M. Miller

== See also ==
- List of oldest companies in Australia
