= HMS Camel (1813) =

History

United Kingdom
- Name: Severn
- Namesake: River Severn
- Builder: James Bonner and James Horsburgh, Calcutta
- Launched: 27 April 1812
- Fate: Sold to the Navy Board in 1813

United Kingdom
- Name: HMS Camel
- Namesake: Camel
- Acquired: 1 November 1813, by purchase
- Fate: Sold 22 April 1831

United Kingdom
- Name: Severn
- Owner: George Mott Braithwaite
- Acquired: 22 April 1831 by purchase
- Fate: Lost c.1842

General characteristics
- Tons burthen: 550, or 558, or 56934/94, or 56735/94, or 57165/94, or 586 (bm)
- Length: Overall:115 ft 6 in (35.2 m); Keel:94 ft 5 1/4 in (28.8 m)
- Beam: 33 ft 8 in (10.3 m)
- Depth of hold: 15 ft 1 in (4.6 m)
- Propulsion: Sail
- Complement: 55
- Armament: 16 × 24-pounder carronades + 2 × 9-pounder chase guns

HMS Camel was launched in 1812 at Calcutta as Severn. She sailed to England where the navy purchased her for use as a troopship and transport. She had an uneventful naval career and the navy sold her in 1831. Her new owner returned her to her name of Severn. She made one voyage to Bengal and back for the British East India Company (EIC). She continued to trade with India but disappeared circa 1841.

== Indiaman ==
After her launch Severn sailed to England. She was admitted to the Registry of Great Britain on 26 October 1813.

On 7 October 1813, the Admiralty decided, to purchase Severn and Hindostan. David Webster, on behalf of the builders Bonner & Horsburgh, negotiated a price for Severn of £17,000 and for Hindostan of £18,000. The purchase price included rigging, the furniture, and guns and ammunition. Hindostan was commissioned as HMS Buffalo. The Navy purchased Severn on 1 November.

== Naval transport ==
The navy commissioned Camel on 23 November 1811 under James Keith, master. In June 1819 her master was Thomas Webb. Under his command Camel served as a store-ship at the Cape of Good Hope. In 1823 the navy proceeded to use Camel as a convict hulk.

Disposal: The "Principal Officers and Commissioners of His Majesty's Navy" first offered the "Camel, store-ship, of 558 tons", "lying at Deptford", for sale on 13 April 1831. On 22 April George Mott Braithwaite purchased Camel for £2,800. She then resumed her original name of Severn.

== Merchantman ==
Severn entered Lloyd's Register in 1831 with Braithwaite, master and owner, trade London–Calcutta, and having undergone small repairs in that year.

EIC voyage: The EIC chartered Severn on 1 May 1833 from George Mott Braithwaite for one voyage to Bengal. The rate was £7 12s per ton.

Captain George Mott Braithwaite sailed from Portsmouth on 27 July 1833. Severn reached the Cape of Good Hope on 13 October and arrived at Calcutta on 27 December. Homeward bound, she was at Saugor on 12 March 1834, reached Saint Helena on 10 June, and arrived at The Downs on 11 August.

In 1836 or so, H. Wake replaced Braithwaite as master and Gladstanes replace him as owner. Her trade was London–Bombay.

On 20 October 1837 a party of missionaries boarded Severn at Gravesend, were bound for the mission stations in Travancore. On her way down the Channel Severn sustained damages and had to put into Portsmouth. She then left Portsmouth on 5 November.

== Fate ==
Lloyd's Register for 1842 had H. Wake, master, Goldstanes, owner, and trade London–Calcutta. It also had the later addition of the notation "missing" by Severn's name.

Severn had sailed from Calcutta on 13 December 1840 bound for China. As of 28 August 1841 she had not been heard from.
