= William Smillie =

Australian politician

William Smillie (c. 1810 – 11 Dec 1852) was an appointed member of the first Legislative Council of South Australia, serving from March 1840 to February 1851.

== History ==
Smillie was a son of Matthew Smillie (c. 1781 – 12 March 1847), a solicitor of Leith, Scotland and his wife Elizabeth Corse Smillie, née Nairne (c. 1791 – 17 October 1861). Smillie was a partner in his father's legal practice. He became fascinated with the newly founded colony of South Australia, and published a series of articles in the Stirling Advertiser, reprinted as a book The Great South Land in 1838.

He and his parents subsequently emigrated on the Indus, arriving in South Australia in January 1839. His father, through a special survey, purchased three sections in the vicinity of Mount Barker, which he subdivided, establishing the township of Nairne which he named in honour of his wife. They established a home, "The Vallies" or "The Valleys" in the area. In 1840 Smillie was appointed advocate-general, which position until 1857 was linked to a seat on the Legislative Council, succeeding Robert Bernard.

Smillie was plagued with poor health. In 1849 he took three months' leave of absence in Tasmania, in the hope of some improvement. William Bartley acted in his absence. His health further failing, in June 1851 Smillie took eighteen months' leave of absence, holidaying in St. Thomas in the West Indies, where he experienced some improvement. Charles Mann (the first incumbent) acted in his absence for a month or two, followed by Richard Davies Hanson. He died in Paris, en route to Italy, and was buried in Scotland.

He was distinguished by his general amiableness and cultivated mind, and by the interest he took, not only in his professional duties, but in all that related to the well-being of the colony

== Family ==
William Smillie married Eliza Jane Farquharson ( – ) daughter of Robert Farquarson of Allargue, in 1844. their family included:

- Jean Nairne Smillie (16 April 1846 – 29 February 1880)
- Elizabeth Smillie (c. 1848 – 4 September 1869)
- Matthew William Smillie (23 February 1850 – 23 October 1867) died in Aberdeen

== Bibliography ==
- Smillie, William The Great South Land 1838.
- Hon. Wm. Smillie Mental Culture: An Introductory Discourse to the Adelaide Literary and Scientific Association and Mechanics' Institute. South Australian Magazine. Vol I, issue ?? 1842
