= George Milner Stephen =

Australian politician

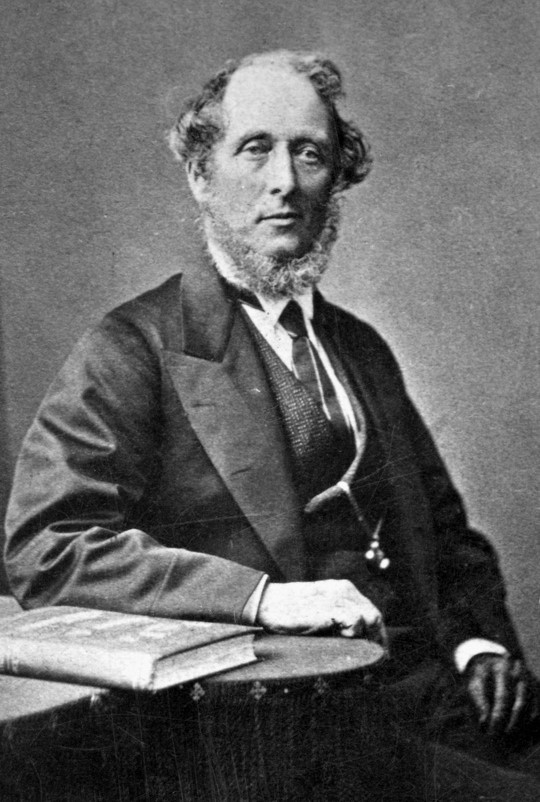

George Milner Stephen (18 December 1812 – 16 January 1894), often written G. Milner Stephen, was a South Australian and Victorian politician and faith healer.

== Early life ==
Stephen born in Wells, Somerset, England, the sixth son of John Stephen, later judge of the Supreme Court of New South Wales, and his wife Mary Anne, née Pasmore. G. M. Stephen was the younger brother of Sir Alfred Stephen. Stephen was educated at Honiton Grammar School, topping every class. Stephen moved to Sydney with his father, arriving in the Prince Regent in July 1824.

Stephen won the silver medal for classics at Sydney Grammar School within his first year.

== Career ==
On 9 February 1838, Stephen was appointed advocate-general and crown solicitor in South Australia. Stephen was Colonial Secretary of South Australia from October 1838 to July 1839. He served as Acting Governor in the interregnum (16 July 1838 – 17 October 1838) between Governors Hindmarsh and Gawler, appointing Robert Bernard to succeed him as crown solicitor and advocate-general. Stephen was appointed colonial secretary by the incoming Governor.

In July 1839 Hindmarsh and his wife Susan transferred ownership of the Section 353 (the Town of Hindmarsh) from themselves to Stephen and the surveyor Arthur Fydell Lindsay.

Stephen was quick to recognise the potential for great wealth in the South Australian Government's special survey scheme, and in 1839 was its first applicant, securing 1,000 acres (400 ha) on the north bank of the Gawler River.

In the 2 July 1856 edition of the Melbourne Argus, an unfavourable article was printed regarding Stephen, part of which stated "We are unwilling to say more about Mr. George Milner Stephen than will suffice to save the constituency he persists in seeking to represent from the regrets that would assuredly follow his election..."

In August 1859 Stephen was elected a member of the Victorian Legislative Assembly for Collingwood and served until July 1861.

== Death ==
Stephen died at the Brunswick, Victoria home of his adopted daughter, Mrs. Tomlinson, following surgery to remove a large bladder stone.

== Family ==
The Stephen family is a prominent legal dynasty in Australia. His father, John Stephen, was a judge of the Supreme Court of New South Wales, and his brother, Sir Alfred Stephen, KCMG CB (20 August 1802 – 15 October 1894), was Lieutenant-Governor and Chief Justice of New South Wales. Another brother, John Stephen, (died 1854) was the earliest created alderman for the City of Melbourne.

George married Mary ( – 27 December 1887), daughter of Sir John Hindmarsh on 9 July 1840 They had seven children, including an adopted daughter:

- Harold Wilberforce Hindmarsh Stephen (1841 – 30 November 1889) journalist and MLA for Monaro in New South Wales parliament
- Alfred Farish Hindmarsh Stephen (ca.1844 – 18 April 1928) married Annie Muriel Beaumont on 9 August 1883 minister of religion
- Florence Mary Hindmarsh Stephen (10 June 1846 – 13 July 1916) married Fredrick Albert Wilkinson on 12 May 1875
- George Shadforth Hindmarsh Stephen (28 November 1848 – 12 September 1890) married Alice
- Lionel Viney Hindmarsh Stephen (5 December 1854 – 3 December 1922) planted "Ivanhoe" vineyard at Pokolbin, New South Wales
- Evelyn A. Hindmarsh Stephen (14 June 1861 – 7 August 1951) Registrar with Department of Mines
- adopted daughter Zenobia Virginia Broderick (ca.1864 – 29 March 1925) married land broker Ralph Ward-Tomlinson ( – 26 September 1918) on 27 January 1893

South Australian Legislative Council
Preceded by James H. Fisher; John Hindmarsh; Henry Jickling; Thomas B. Strangways	Member of the South Australian Legislative Council; 1838–1839; Served alongside: Multiple Members	Succeeded by Edward C. Frome; Robert Gouger; George Hall; Charles Sturt
Political offices
Preceded by Thomas B. Strangways	Colonial Secretary of South Australia; 1838 – 1839	Succeeded by Robert Gouger
Victorian Legislative Assembly
Preceded by George Harker	Member of Parliament for Collingwood; 1859 – 1861; Served alongside: Thomas Embling	Succeeded by John Edwards
Government offices
Previous: R. Adm. John Hindmarsh	Acting; Governor of South Australia; 1838	Succeeded by Lt. Col. George Gawler
