= George Hall (British administrator) =

George Hall Esq.
- Spouse: Julia (née Gawler) (married 1847)

Private secretary to the Governor of South Australia
- In office 1838–1840
- Governor: George Gawler

acting Colonial Secretary of South Australia
- In office July–October 1840

Governor of Parkhurst Prison
- In office 1843 – 1861

George Hall Esq. was a British administrator in the 19th century.

== South Australia ==
George Hall, commonly referred to as "Captain Hall", was private secretary to the Governor of South Australia George Gawler and Clerk of the Legislative Council in 1840, including a period acting as Colonial Secretary of South Australia while Robert Gouger was unwell. He was Clerk of the Council from 18 October 1838 through to 1840.

== Parkhurst Prison ==
After his time in South Australia, Hall was governor of Parkhurst Prison on the Isle of Wight. In his time as Governor of Parkhurst Prison (1843 to 1861), Hall proposed sending boys who were convicted in Britain to colonies as Parkhurst apprentices, whereupon they would receive a pardon on arrival in a colony, but be expected to serve out an apprenticeship before being eligible to return to Britain. This proposal was rejected by the Colony of South Australia, but accepted in Swan River Colony and forced on the Colony of New Zealand. Hall was an advocate of using juvenile prison to rehabilitate young offenders to society rather than teaching them to be better criminals in their adult life. He sought to teach them a trade or other skills to avoid a life of crime.

== Personal life ==
Hall married Julia, eldest daughter of Col George Gawler on 21 September 1847 at St. John's, Derby.

== Legacy ==
From his time in South Australia, two minor geographic features were named after him. Edward John Eyre named Mount Hall (33.05779017°S 134.48124893°E) on Eyre Peninsula after him and his boss (and future father-in-law) George Gawler named Hall's Bay (now Hall Bay, 34.0351°S 135.247°E) after him.

Political offices
Preceded by Robert Gouger	Acting Colonial Secretary of South Australia; 1840	Succeeded by Robert Gouger
