= Chief Secretary of South Australia =

South Australian government minister (1856–1989)

The Chief Secretary of South Australia (since 1856) or Colonial Secretary of South Australia (1836–1856) was a key role in the governance of the Colony of South Australia (1836–1900) and State of South Australia (from 1901) until it was abolished in 1989. It was the main executive and coordinating authority of government administration. It was the official channel of communication to the Governor of South Australia from government departments and the general public.

The Premier's Department was created in 1965, and over time assumed the functions of the Chief Secretary's Office.

== List of Colonial and Chief Secretaries of South Australia ==
Colonial Secretaries 1836–1856
Ordinal	Colonial Secretary	Period
	Robert Gouger	1836–1837
	Thomas Bewes Strangways	1837–1838
	George Milner Stephen	1838–1839
	Robert Gouger	1839–1841
	George Hall	acting July–October 1840
	J. Alexander Jackson	1841–1843
	Alfred Miller Mundy	1843–1849
	Boyle Travers Finniss	pro tem May–Oct 1849
	Charles Sturt	1849–1851
	Boyle Travers Finniss	1852–1856
	Oliver K. Richardson	acting 21 Dec. 1854–8 June 1855
Chief Secretaries 1856–1989
	Boyle Travers Finniss	1856–1857
	John Baker	1857
	Robert Richard Torrens	1857
	William Younghusband	1857–1860
	George Marsden Waterhouse	1860–1861
	John Morphett	1861
	George Marsden Waterhouse	1861–1863
	John Hart	1863
	Henry Ayers	1863–1865
	John Hart	1865–1866
	Arthur Blyth	1866–1867
	Henry Ayers	1867–1868
	John Hart	1868
	Henry Ayers	1868
	John Tuthill Bagot	1868–1870
	Augustine Stow	1870
	William Milne	1870–1872
	Henry Ayers	1872–1873
	Arthur Blyth	1873–1875
	William Morgan	1875–1876
	George Charles Hawker	1876
	Henry Ayers	1876–1877
	William Morgan	1877–1881
	John Cox Bray	1881–1884
	James Garden Ramsay	1884
	John Colton	1884–1885
	John Brodie Spence	1885
	John Cox Bray	1885–1886
	John Brodie Spence	1886
	David Murray	1886–1887
	James Garden Ramsay	1887–1889
	John Alexander Cockburn	1889–1890
	John Cox Bray	1890–1892
	Charles Cameron Kingston	1892
	John Alexander Cockburn	1892
	John William Downer	1892–1893
	William Copley	1893
	John Hannah Gordon	1893–1896
	James O'Loghlin	1896–1899
	John Lancelot Stirling	1899
	John Greeley Jenkins	1899–1905
	Joseph Vardon	1905
	Andrew Alexander Kirkpatrick	1905–1909
	Frederick Samuel Wallis	1909
	John George Bice	1909–1910
	Frederick Samuel Wallis	1910–1912
	John George Bice	1912–1915
	Alfred William Styles	1915–1917
	Archibald Peake	1917–1919
	John George Bice	1919–1923
	Thomas Pascoe	1923–1924
	James Jelley	1924–1927
	Henry Tassie	1927–1930
	James Jelley	1930
	Stanley Whitford	1930–1933
	George Ritchie	1933–1939
	Lyell McEwin	1939–1965
	Bert Shard	1965–1968
	Ren DeGaris	1968–1970
	Bert Shard	1970–1973
	Alfred Kneebone	1973–1975
	Don Banfield	1975–1977
	Don Simmons	1977–1979
	Allan Rodda	1979–1982
	John Olsen	1982
	Gavin Keneally	1982–1984
	Jack Wright	1984–1985
	Don Hopgood	1985–1989
	Bob Gregory	1989

== See also ==
- Chief Secretary - a generic description of the role in British colonies
