= Peter Hennis =

British physician

Dr Peter Hennis MD (c. 1802 – 18 May 1833) was a British physician. He treated many patients in the Exeter cholera outbreak of 1832. He was also the last known person to die from duelling in Devon.

== Biography ==
Hennis was born in Youghal, County Cork, Ireland. He graduated from the University of Edinburgh with a Doctor of Medicine in 1825. He moved to Exeter in 1830 and on 2 November 1830 became a physician at the Exeter Dispensary. During the city's cholera outbreak in 1832, he was appointed medical officer to the poorest South District of the city. In May 1833, Hennis had a disagreement with Sir John Jeffcott which resulted in a duel with pistols on 10 May. Hennis later died on 18 May 1833 from his wounds. Following his death, the people of Exeter were outraged. Two hundred and fifty dignitaries attended his funeral service at the Cathedral and 20,000 citizens lined the route to St Sidwell's Church where he was interred.
