= Robert Bernard (advocate-general) =

Australian politician

Robert Bernard (c. 1808 – 23 October 1840) was an appointed member of the first Legislative Council of South Australia, serving from 18 July 1838 to 27 March 1840.

== History ==
Bernard was educated at Trinity College, Dublin and became a barrister at law and Law and Member of the Queen's Inns, Dublin.

He was practising law in Tasmania before arriving in South Australia and applying to be admitted to the Supreme Court as Barrister, Attorney, Solicitor, and Proctor of South Australia. He was appointed on 16 July 1838 by the acting Governor George Milner Stephen, as his successor to the position of advocate-general and crown solicitor for South Australia, without having practised in the Province.

He was appointed Registrar General and acting Judge in March 1840, William Smillie succeeding him as advocate-general and crown solicitor. He thereupon lost his seat on the Legislative Council, which was attached to the position of advocate-general. He died six months later after a prolonged illness.
