= Young Bingham Hutchinson =

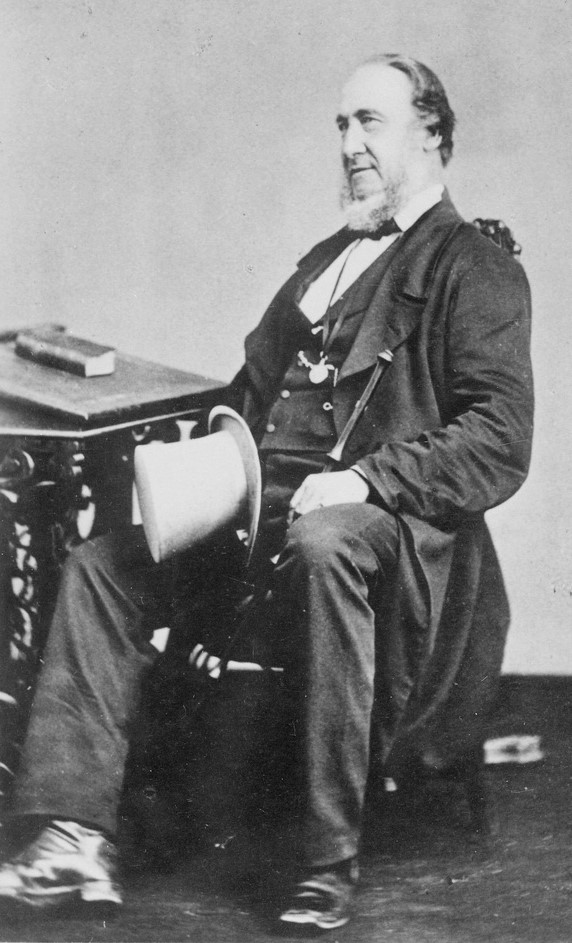

Young Bingham Hutchinson (born 14 August 1806 in Richmond, Surrey, England – d. 3 August 1870 at Hindmarsh valley, South Australia) was a Royal Navy officer, early explorer and settler of South Australia. Hutchinson was the great-grandson of the loyalist governor of the Province of Massachusetts Bay Thomas Hutchinson.

Hutchinson joined the Royal Navy and served as a lieutenant on the Dom Joas between 1833 and 1834. He arrived in South Australia on HMS Buffalo in December 1836. In April 1837, Hutchinson and a servant named William Burt were the first recorded Europeans to reach the summit of Mount Lofty, the highest point of the Adelaide Hills. Later that year, in November, Hutchinson, Thomas Bewes Strangways and a party explored the Fleurieu Peninsula and the Lake Alexandrina region, discovering Currency Creek.

Purchasing a number of town blocks and other property in the Encounter Bay district, Hutchinson was also made South Australia's second emigration agent, from September 1837 to February 1838, following the dismissal of John Brown. In November 1838, Hutchinson returned to England, where he lived for about the next two decades. During that time, he married Augusta Emma nee Kingdon in 1852 and had three daughters and two sons. After returning to South Australia, he and his family lived at his property at Hindmarsh Valley, near Victor Harbor, where he died in 1870.

While aboard HMS Buffalo, Hutchinson kept a diary which has become one of the most informative sources of information about life on the ship and the early days of the colony.
