= Henry Jickling =

Australian judge

Henry Jickling (c.1800 – 19 September 1873) was appointed as a caretaker judge in 1837 to the Supreme Court of South Australia, which is the highest ranking court in the Australian State of South Australia.

On 19 November 1837, Judge John Jeffcott left the colony of South Australia for Tasmania. This left Jickling as the only lawyer in Adelaide, South Australia's capital; consequently, he was appointed an acting judge while Jeffcott was gone. Jeffcott, however, died at sea on 12 December 1837, leaving Jickling in charge of the Court. Although appointed as a caretaker judge, Jickling was responsible for two important issues: he codified the testamentary causes jurisdiction of the Court and admitted the first practitioners of the Court, in March 1838.

Jickling was also a member of the South Australian Legislative Council.

After Charles Cooper arrived as the Chief Justice of South Australia, Jickling ceased to be a judge, and practised at the bar for some years, until he was appointed to the office of Master of the Court, in which position he remained for some years until he retired on the pension then open to all Government officers who had served for a certain period, and returned to England.

Jinkling died at St. Helier's, Jersey on 19 September 1873, aged 73.

== See also ==
- Judiciary of Australia

Legal offices
Preceded by John Jeffcott	Acting Judge of the Supreme Court of South Australia; 1837–1838	Succeeded by Charles Cooper as Chief Justice of South Australia
