= James William MacDonald =

Australian politician

James William MacDonald (27 January 1811 – 1 December 1881) was a politician in colonial South Australia and served as Treasurer of South Australia.

MacDonald was the son of Captain Archibald MacDonald, of 10th Hussars, and grandson of the first Lord Macdonald, in the peerage of Ireland, who claimed descent from the Lord of the Isles. He emigrated, in 1839, to South Australia, where he settled in the Sturt district.

In 1841 he was appointed Commissioner of Crown Lands, a nominated member of the unicameral South Australian Legislative Council from 1 July 1844 to 31 January 1846 and in 1844-45 was Treasurer. After acting as Visiting Magistrate in the north, he was for a number of years Magistrate at Burra, and ultimately Commissioner of Insolvency for four years. Retiring on a pension, he resided at the Sturt till 1880, when he returned to England, where he died in the suburbs of London, on 1 December 1881.
