= John Jeffcott =

British colonial judge

Sir John Jeffcott
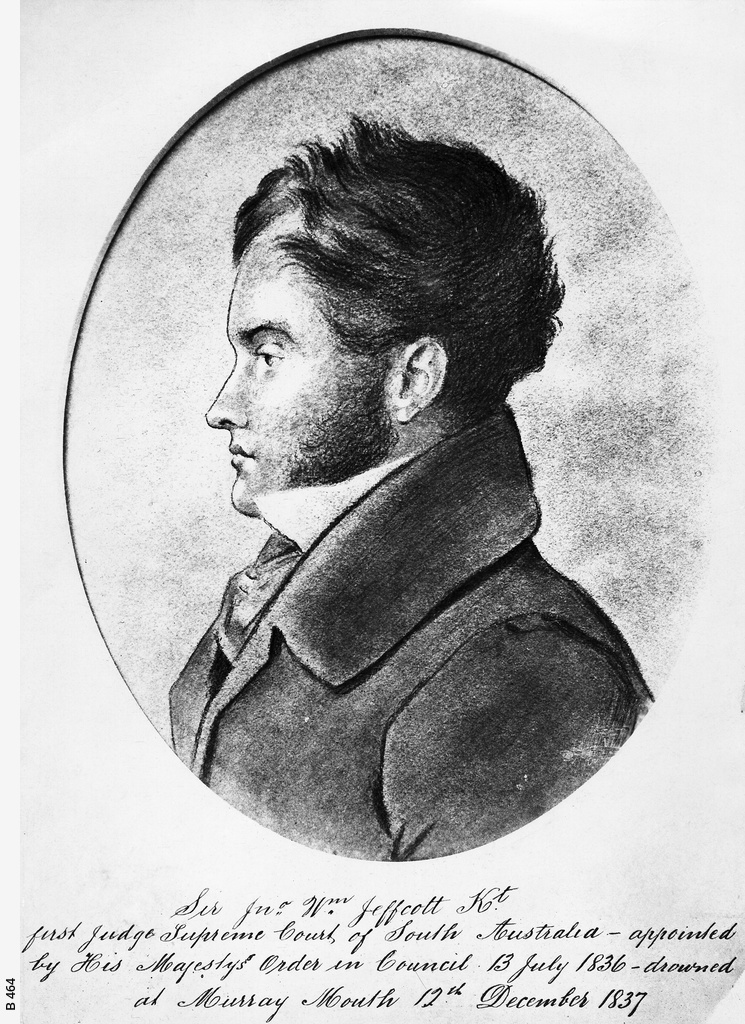

Justice of the Supreme Court of South Australia
- In office 27 May 1836 – 12 December 1837
- Succeeded by: Charles Cooper

Chief Justice of Sierra Leone and the Gambia
- In office February 1830 – May 1833
- Preceded by: George Rendall
- Succeeded by: Robert Rankin

Personal details
- Born: 1796 County Kerry, Ireland
- Died: 12 December 1837 (aged 40–41) River Murray, South Australia
- Relations: William Jeffcott (brother)
- Education: Trinity College, Dublin

Sir John William Jeffcott (1796 – 12 December 1837) was the first judge of the Supreme Court of South Australia. He also served as Chief Justice of Sierra Leone.

== Biography ==
Jeffcott was born in County Kerry, Ireland. He was educated at Trinity College, Dublin, and was called to the English Bar at the Inner Temple in February 1826. Jeffcott was installed as Chief Justice of the colony of Sierra Leone on 26 April 1830. He was the only judge in the colony, and much of his work arose from attempts to end the Transatlantic slave trade. Jeffcott was knighted on 1 May 1833, when he returned to England on leave.

Jeffcott had been engaged to be married but the engagement was broken off by his fiancée or her family. Whilst in England, Jeffcott received news that a Dr Peter Hennis had made derogatory comments about Jeffcott's conduct in the affair. Jeffcott confronted Hennis, but refused to accept his explanation. On Friday, 10 May 1833 a duel with pistols was organised at Haldon racecourse near Exeter, between the two men, in the course of which Hennis was fatally wounded. A warrant was issued for Jeffcott's arrest on charges of murder, and he went into hiding. The three organisers of the duel were tried as accessories to the murder, but were acquitted, apparently due to a misunderstanding of the applicable law on the part of the jury.

Following that verdict of acquittal, Jeffcott surrendered, was arraigned, and no evidence being tendered, he too was acquitted. However, he was removed from his position of Chief Justice of Sierra Leone, and his reputation was greatly damaged. On 27 May 1836, Jeffcott accepted appointment as the first judge of the new colony of South Australia, a position he had first applied for when the colony was proposed in 1834. Jeffcott never officially held the title "Chief Justice of South Australia", which was not created until 1856.

Jeffcott travelled to Australia in September 1836, on the Isabella in the company of J. B. Hack and family, his arrangements for passage being made secretly to defeat the efforts of creditors to recover money from him. He arrived in Hobart, Van Diemen's Land (Tasmania) on 1 January 1837, where he became engaged to marry his cousin Anne Kermode. He proceeded to Adelaide, South Australia, arriving there on 21 April 1837.

Jeffcott became a close friend and advisor to the embattled Governor of South Australia, John Hindmarsh, and helped to smooth tensions between the Governor and his officers. As well as Judge, Jeffcott was also a member of the South Australian Legislative Council from 28 December 1836 to 12 December 1837) the source of both executive and legislative power in the colony.

On 13 May 1837, Jeffcott presided over the first Criminal Sessions. Seven prisoners were presented for trial before a jury, the foreman of which was Col. William Light. Apart from one other criminal case involving two Encounter Bay whalers charged with threatening to shoot another man in a quarrel between rival boats, these first Criminal Sessions appear to be the only occasion when Jeffcott actually sat as Judge. Jeffcott had lost all of his belongings when the ship in which they were being transported was wrecked, so he returned to Van Diemen's land in June 1837, and did not return to South Australia until September.

Jeffcott left Adelaide for Van Diemen's Land again on 19 November 1837. Henry Jickling, the only barrister in the colony, was appointed Acting Judge in Jeffcott's absence. While waiting for a ship at Encounter Bay, Jeffcott joined an expedition to explore the Murray Mouth. He drowned on 12 December 1837 when the overloaded whaleboat in which he was a passenger overturned in rough seas.

His brother William Jeffcott was also a barrister and in 1843 was appointed a judge of the Supreme Court of New South Wales for the District of Port Phillip.

Jeffcott Street and Kermode Street in North Adelaide are named after Sir John Jeffcott and Robert Kermode, the brother of Jeffcott's fiancée. Jeffcott Chambers, barristers' chambers adjacent to the Supreme Court building in Gouger Street, Adelaide, are also named for him.

== See also ==
- Judiciary of Australia

== Sources ==
- R. M. Hague, Sir John Jeffcott: Portrait of a Colonial Judge (Melbourne, 1963)
- R. M. Hague, Hague's History of the Law in South Australia 1837-1867 (Adelaide, 2005)

Legal offices
New title	Judge of the Supreme Court of South Australia; 1836-1837	Succeeded by Henry Jickling as Acting Judge
