= George Gawler =

Governor of South Australia from 1838 to 1841

George Gawler KH
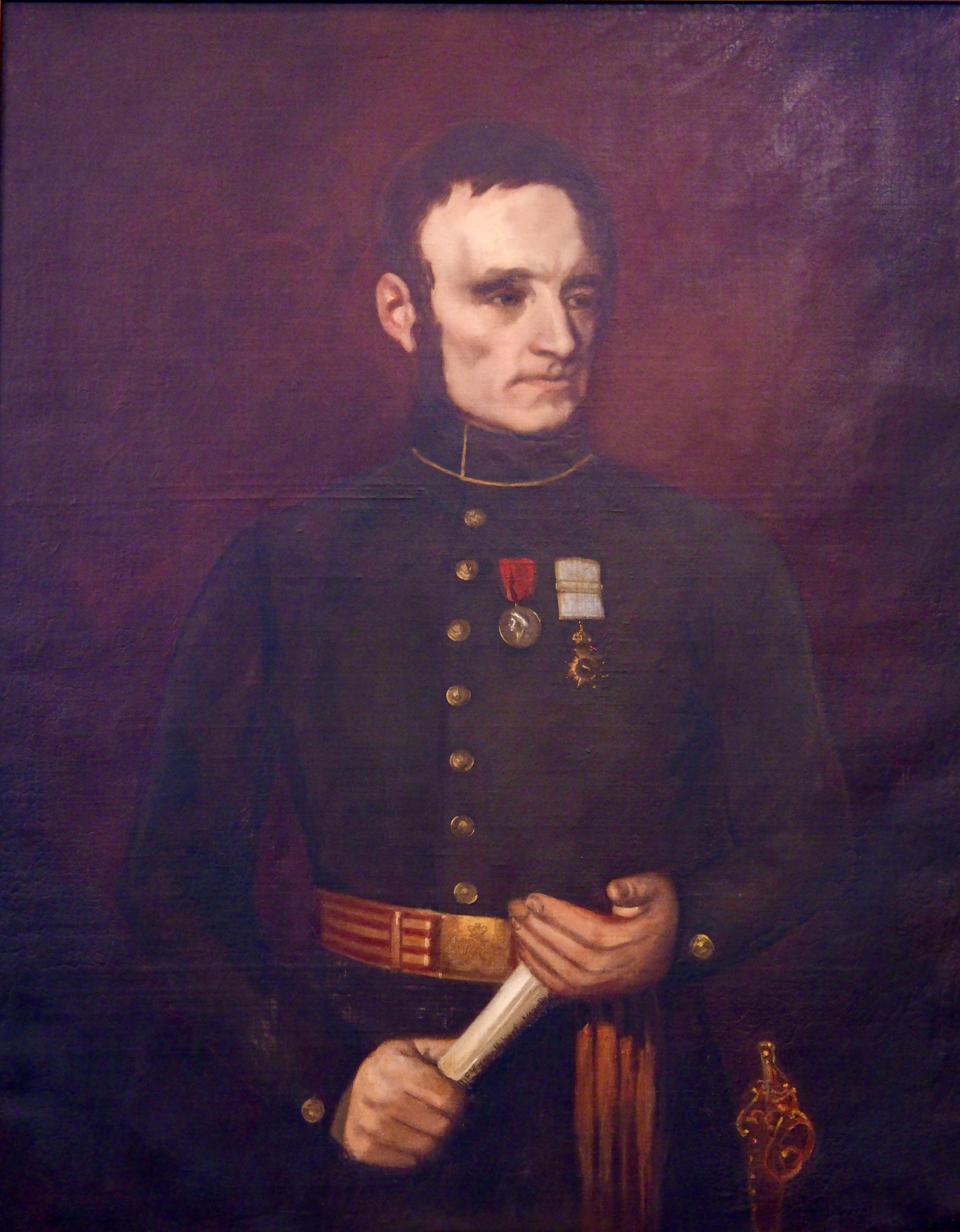

2nd Governor of South Australia
- In office 17 October 1838 – 15 May 1841
- Monarch: Victoria
- Preceded by: John Hindmarsh
- Succeeded by: George Grey

Personal details
- Born: 21 July 1795
- Died: 7 May 1869 (aged 73) Southsea
- Resting place: Portsmouth
- Spouse: Maria
- Occupation: Army officer, Colonial administrator
- Awards: Military General Service Medal

Military service
- Allegiance: United Kingdom
- Branch/service: British Army
- Years of service: 1810–1850
- Rank: Colonel
- Battles/wars: Napoleonic Wars; Peninsular War; Siege of Badajoz (WIA); Battle of Vitoria; Battle of the Pyrenees; Battle of the Bidassoa; Battle of Nivelle; Battle of the Nive; Battle of Orthez; Battle of Toulouse; Hundred Days; Battle of Waterloo

Colonel George Gawler KH (21 July 1795 – 7 May 1869) was the second Governor of South Australia, at the same time serving as Resident Commissioner, from 17 October 1838 until 15 May 1841.

== Biography ==
=== Early life ===
Gawler, born on 21 July 1795, was the only child of Captain Samuel Gawler, captain in the 73rd Regiment of Foot, and his wife Julia, née Russell. Gawler's father was killed in battle in Mysore, India in December 1804. The Gawler family historically came from Devon. George Gawler was educated by a tutor, then at a school in Cold Bath, Islington. Two years were then spent at the Royal Military College, Great Marlow.

=== Army service ===
In October 1810, Gawler obtained a commission as an ensign in the 52nd (Oxfordshire) Regiment of Foot. In January 1812, he went to serve in the Peninsular War and remained in Spain until 1814, taking part in the advance on Madrid. From there he went to France and fought in the Battle of Waterloo. He stayed in France until 1818. Afterwards, he worked in recruiting and advanced to the rank of lieutenant-colonel in 1834 and received the Royal Hanoverian Guelphic Order (KH), third class in 1937.

=== South Australia ===
In 1838 Gawler was appointed Governor of South Australia in succession to Captain John Hindmarsh, who had been recalled, as well as being appointed to the role of Resident Commissioner, taking over from the first incumbent, James Hurtle Fisher. Gawler and his wife and children arrived on the Pestonjee Bomanjee on 12 October 1838, after a four-month journey via Tenerife and Rio de Janeiro. Gawler found the colony had almost no public finances, underpaid officials and 4000 immigrants living in makeshift accommodation. He was allowed a maximum of £12,000 expenditure a year, with an additional £5,000 credit for emergencies.

His first goal was to address delays over rural settlement and primary production. He persuaded Charles Sturt to come from New South Wales to work as surveyor-general, personally overseeing the surveys in the meantime, as Colonel William Light had resigned due to ailing health and the demands placed on him with insufficient staff. Gawler promptly increased and reorganised the fledgling police force, promoting its commander Henry Inman. Gawler appointed more colonial officials, took part in exploration, and improved the facilities at Port Adelaide during his tenure as governor. The first permanent Government House was built, which is now the East Wing of the present building.

The South Australian Company's greatest source of revenue, the sale of land, had largely dried up due to surveying delays in 1838. The rapid increase in population in 1839 and 1840 due to immigration greatly added to the unemployment problem. Droughts in other Australian colonies in 1840, before South Australia was self-sufficient in food, drove up the cost of living rapidly. Gawler increased public expenditure to stave off collapse, which resulted in bankruptcy and changes to the way the colony was run. Over £200,000 had been spent and the land fund in London had been exhausted. A£155,000 loan was approved by the British Parliament (later made a gift) and Captain George Grey was sent to replace Gawler, after Grey promised to "maintain the strictest economy". In his time in office Governor Grey helped make South Australia self-sufficient in terms of agriculture and restored public confidence, though the real salvation of the colony may have been the discovery of copper at Burra in 1845.

== Later life and death ==
After retirement as governor in 1841, Gawler devoted his time to religious and charitable works.

In 1845, Gawler wrote a memorandum, The Tranquillization of Syria and the East, in which he suggested that Jews be allowed to establish Jewish agricultural settlements in Palestine as compensation for their suffering under Turkish rule. The Emancipation of the Jews followed in 1847, and in 1849 he toured Palestine with Moses Montefiore. In a further work, Syria and its Near Prospects, (1853) he made four arguments for the proposition that Jewish settlement was already under way.

In 1850 Gawler retired from the army. In the same year, he wrote Present State of Moral Principle in the Supreme Government of the British Colonial Empire, in which he petitioned the Queen seeking redress for the injustices done to him by successive secretaries of state. Accusing George Grey of dishonesty, he claimed that it had been through his efforts that South Australia was "the only cheap and brilliantly successful new colony in modern history".

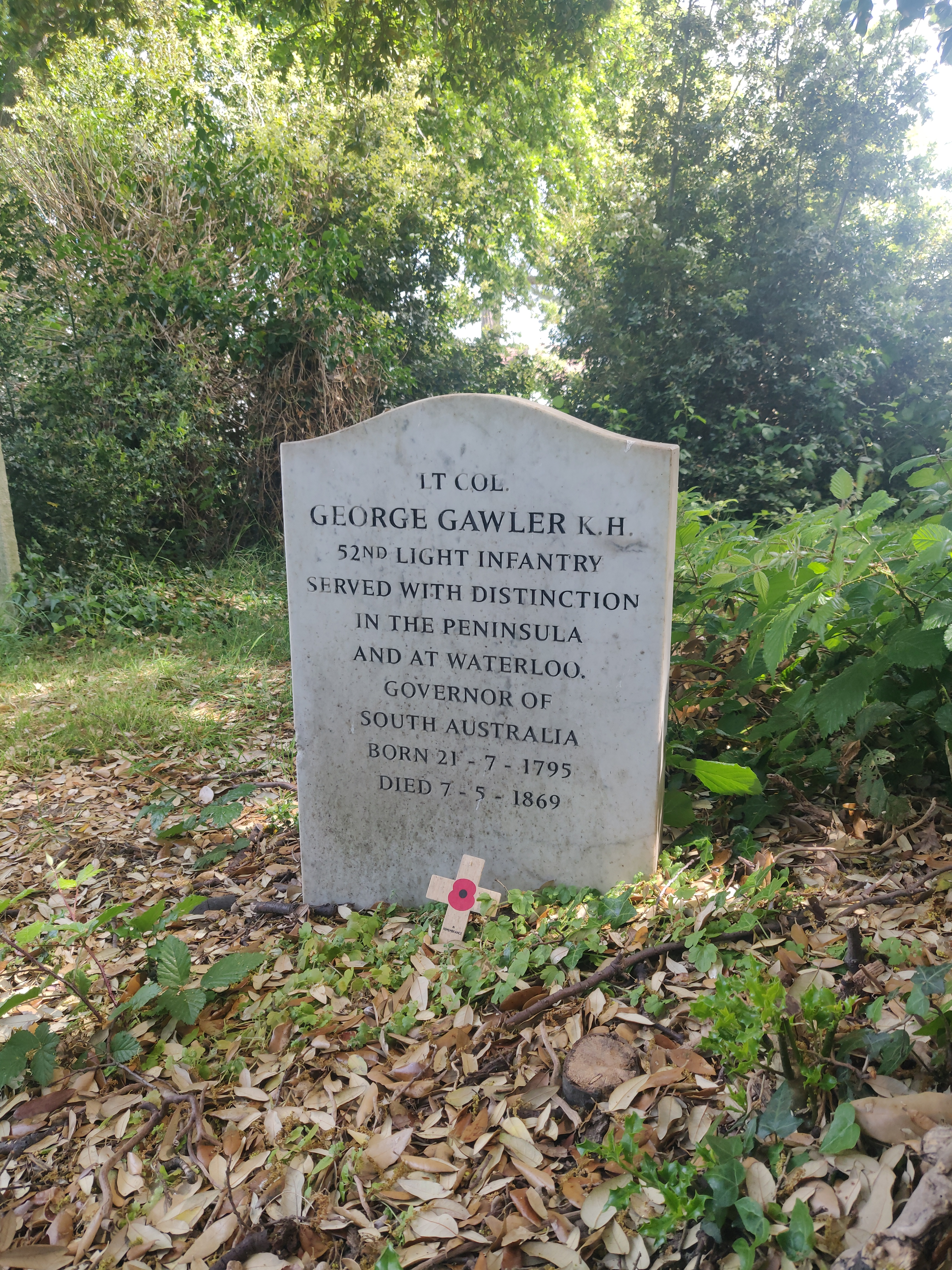
Headstone of George Gawler in Highland Road Cemetery, Southsea. His actual grave was discovered near this location.

Gawler spent his last years at Southsea, where he died of pneumonia on 7 May 1869. He was buried at Portsmouth.

== Legacy ==
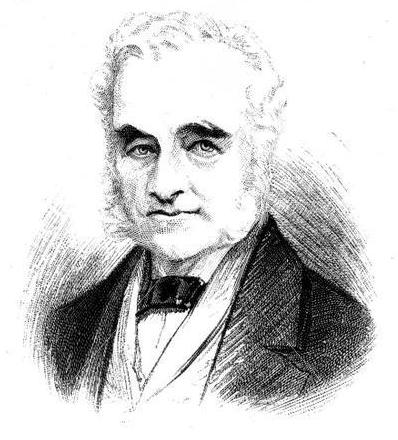
George Gawler

Much of Gawler's expenditure was on works of both immediate and long-lasting benefit to the Colony and the State, such as the Great Eastern Road. Many modern historians put him among the founders of South Australia.

The town of Gawler was named after him, as well as the adjoining river.

The Gawler Ranges at the north end of Eyre Peninsula are also named after him by the explorer Edward John Eyre in 1839.

Gawler's reputation was somewhat tarnished by his involvement in the Maria massacre in 1840.

Derby's Town and County Museum in the 1830s included Gawler in its list of principal benefactors. Gawler had contributed a collection of minerals and exotic stuffed birds which included an albatross from his time as governor. Also, Gawler's gardener in Australia, Joseph Whittaker, contributed hundreds of pressed flowers and plants to Derby Museum and to Kew Gardens.

A portrait of him hangs in Parliament House, Adelaide, and another in the City Council Chamber, Adelaide.

== Family ==
Gawler married Maria Cox in September 1820. Their ten children included:

- Julia Cox Gawler (1824–1899)? (born c. 1834)? (1822–1901) was an accomplished artist. She married George Hall, Governor of Parkhurst Prison 1843–1861, and her father's private secretary in South Australia, on 21 September 1847. She was the author of Memoir of the Late Governor Gawler.
- Catherine Gawler, married Lord Edward Poulden, R.N.
- Jane Cox Gawler, never married.
- Gawler's eldest surviving son, Henry (1827–1894), in 1857 married Caroline Augusta, daughter of the Rev. B. Philpot, rector of Great Cressingham then returned to South Australia in 1858. He was a solicitor in the South Australian Land Titles Office from 1858 to 1884.

- Their son Douglas Gawler, was a member of parliament in Western Australia.

- John Cox Gawler (1830–1882), served with the 73rd regiment, and was appointed Keeper of the Regalia at the Tower of London, a post he held until his death.

== See also ==
- Governor Gawler (1840 ship)
- Historical Records of Australia
- Maria (brigantine)
- Thomas Shuldham O'Halloran

Government offices
Preceded by Captain John Hindmarsh, KH, RN	Governor of South Australia; 1838–1841	Succeeded by Sir George Edward Grey KCB
