= John Hindmarsh =

British naval officer (1785–1860)

Rear-Admiral Sir John Hindmarsh KH
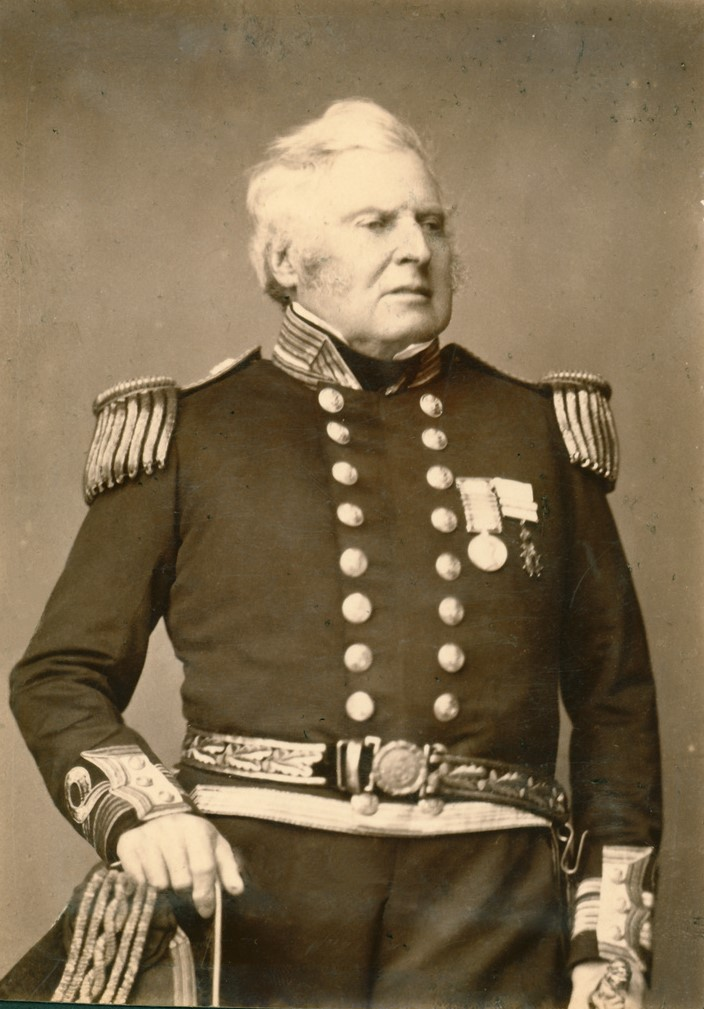

1st Governor of South Australia
- In office 28 December 1836 – 16 July 1838
- Monarchs: William IV; Victoria
- Preceded by: Office established
- Succeeded by: George Gawler

Personal details
- Born: 1785 Chatham, Kent; Great Britain
- Died: 29 July 1860 (aged 75) London, United Kingdom
- Resting place: St. Andrew's Church, Hove
- Occupation: Naval officer, Colonial administrator
- Awards: Naval General Service Medal; Knight of the Royal Guelphic Order

Military service
- Allegiance: Great Britain (1793–1801); United Kingdom (1801–1846)
- Branch/service: Royal Navy
- Years of service: 1793–1856
- Rank: Rear-Admiral
- Unit: HMS Bellerophon; HMS Spencer; HMS Victory; HMS Phoebe; HMS Beagle; HMS Nisus; HMS Scylla; HMS Buffalo
- Commands: HMS Scylla; HMS Buffalo
- Battles/wars: French Revolutionary Wars; Glorious First of June; Battle of 17 June 1795; Battle of the Nile; Second Battle of Algeciras; Napoleonic Wars; Battle of Trafalgar; Battle of the Basque Roads; Invasion of Java

Rear-Admiral Sir John Hindmarsh KH (baptised 22 May 1785 – 29 July 1860) was a naval officer and the first Governor of South Australia, from 28 December 1836 to 16 July 1838.

== Family ==
His grandfather William Hindmarsh was a gardener in Coniscliffe, County Durham.

His father, John Hindmarsh, was born on 27 June 1753 and baptised at St Cuthbert's Church, Darlington. He was pressed into the Royal Navy, and eventually became a warrant officer of the Bellerophon. On 23 August 1784 Hindmarsh (senior) married Mrs Mary Roxburgh, a widow, at St George's-in-the East, Middlesex. At the time of the Battle of the Nile, Hindmarsh (senior) was the gunner of the Bellerophon, (This was a warrant officer position.)

Hindmarsh was John and Mary Hindmarsh's eldest son, and was baptised on 25 May 1785 at St Mary's Church, Chatham, Kent.

== Naval career ==
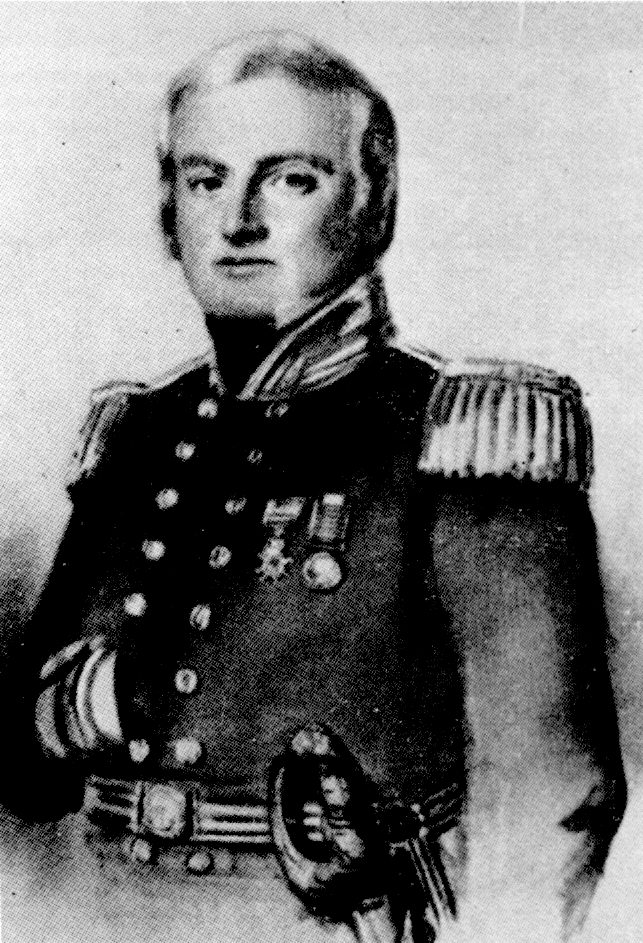

Hindmarsh joined the Royal Navy either in April 1793 (aged seven or eight), or on 19 July 1790 (aged five). In 1793 he was listed on the muster roll of the Bellerophon as the servant of his father. He was schooled by Mr Neale, the purser of the Bellerophon. He saw action on the Bellerophon at the Battle of the Glorious First of June in 1794 and the Battle of the Nile in 1798.

He was promoted to First Class Volunteer, when he was nine, for his actions at the Battle of the Glorious First of June.

During the Battle of the Nile on 1 August 1798, the fire on board the French line-of-battle ship l'Orient put the Bellerophon (1786) in danger; all the other officers on the quarterdeck on the Bellerophon were killed or wounded, so 13-year-old Midshipman Hindmarsh gathered some of the crew, cut the anchor cables, and raised a spritsail to get the ship moving. Captain Darby then came on deck from having his wounds dressed. Nelson knew of this incident and referred to it five years later when he gave Hindmarsh his promotion to lieutenant on 1 August 1803 on board the Victory. Hindmarsh suffered a contusion during the Battle of the Nile that resulted in him later losing an eye.

Hindmarsh transferred to the Spencer in May 1800, and took part in the Battle of Algeciras Bay in 1801. He served on HMS Phoebe at the Battle of Trafalgar, and was first lieutenant of the sloop Beagle, which took a conspicuous part in the Battle of the Basque Roads in 1809, and on the same sloop in the Walcheren expedition later in the year. He served in the Nisus in the invasion of Java in 1811. He was promoted to commander on 15 June 1814. A lengthy period of inaction on half-pay followed, but from March 1830 to December 1831 he commanded the Scylla, and was promoted to captain on 3 September 1831.

William Light captained the paddle steamer the Nile from London to Alexandria to join the Egyptian Navy in 1834, reaching Alexandria in September. Hindmarsh, who had prepared the steamer for delivery at Blackwall Yard on the River Thames, travelled as a passenger on the ship on its journey to Alexandria, and was made captain of the ship by November.

He received his commission as governor and commander-in-chief of the province of South Australia on 14 July 1836. On 11 July 1836 Hindmarsh sailed for South Australia on HMS Buffalo as its first governor after winning influential support and applying to the Colonial Office.

=== Naval General Service Medal ===
When the Naval General Service Medal, designed by William Wyon, was introduced in 1847, it was discovered that only two people were entitled to the medal with seven clasps (one clasp for each battle the recipient took part in): Sir John Hindmarsh and Admiral of the Fleet Sir James Alexander Gordon. The seven clasps on Hindmarsh's medal were for Java, Basque Roads 1809, Trafalgar, Gut of Gibraltar 12 July 1801 (the Second Battle of Algeciras), Nile, 17 June 1795 (known as Cornwallis's Retreat) and 1 June 1794 (the "Glorious First of June"). He was listed to be awarded a good service pension of £150 under the 1850-51 Navy Estimates. He was promoted to rear admiral on the retired list in 1856.

== First Governor of South Australia ==
"Bluff Jack Hindmarsh", as he came to be known, arrived in Holdfast Bay on 28 December 1836, in the Buffalo. Prior to this, earlier arrivals included the Survey Brig Rapid, Cygnet (carrying Colonel William Light's surveyors), Africaine, and Tam O'Shanter. Initially they landed on Kangaroo Island, and sent out the team of surveyors led by Light to find a suitable place for the capital city of the new colony. Hindmarsh, who had no rights in the matter, wanted it at Port Lincoln, rather than the present site as selected by Light.

Light eventually chose the site of Adelaide, and stationed the Cygnet at Port Lincoln to notify Hindmarsh that the capital would be located on the east Coast of Gulf St Vincent near Holdfast Bay, now known as Glenelg, South Australia (named after Lord Glenelg, (Note: Through Lord Glenelg, the name derives from Glenelg, Highland (previously Inverness-shire), Scotland.) the then Colonial Secretary). The name "Adelaide" was chosen by King William IV in honour of his consort Queen Adelaide.

Hindmarsh's proclamation on 28 December 1836 announced the commencement of colonial government and stated that Aborigines were to be treated justly and were 'equally entitled to the privileges of British subjects'. Although most South Australians have been taught that Hindmarsh's proclamation created the colony, it did not. William IV, having been empowered by an Act of Parliament in August 1834, in February 1836 Letters Patent 'Erected and Established' the Province of South Australia. No governor had the power to create colonies.

Hindmarsh was recalled to London in 1838. The Southern Australian, for one, was pleased to see him go; partly as a military man in what should be a civil position, and the divisive nature of his rule, but also hints of personal character defects.

=== Hindmarsh's Proclamation ===
Issued at Glenelg on 28 December 1836:

In announcing to the Colonists of His Majesty's Province of South Australia the establishment of the Government, I hearby call upon them to conduct themselves at all times with order and quietness, duly to respect the laws, and by a course of industry and sobriety, by the practice of sound morality, and a strict observance of the ordinances of religion, to prove themselves to be worthy to be the Founders of a great and free Colony. It is also, at this time especially, my duty to apprise the Colonists of my resolution to take every lawful means for extending the same protection to the native population as to the rest of His Majesty's subjects, and of my firm determination to punish with exemplary severity all acts of violence and injustice which may in any manner be practised or attempted against the natives, who are to be considered to be as much under the safeguard of the law as the Colonists themselves, and equally entitled to the privileges of British subjects. I trust therefore, with confidence to the exercise of moderation and forbearance by all classes in their intercourse with the native inhabitants, and that they will omit no opportunity of assisting me to fulfill His Majesty's gracious and benevolent intentions towards them by promoting their advancement in civilisation, and ultimately, under the blessing of Divine Providence, their conversion to the Christian Faith.

== Governor of Heligoland ==
In 1840, Hindmarsh was made Lieutenant-Governor of Heligoland, where he served until 7 March 1857.

Hindmarsh was knighted by Queen Victoria on 7 August 1851, and retired in 1857 to the seaside town of Hove, England.

== Legacy ==
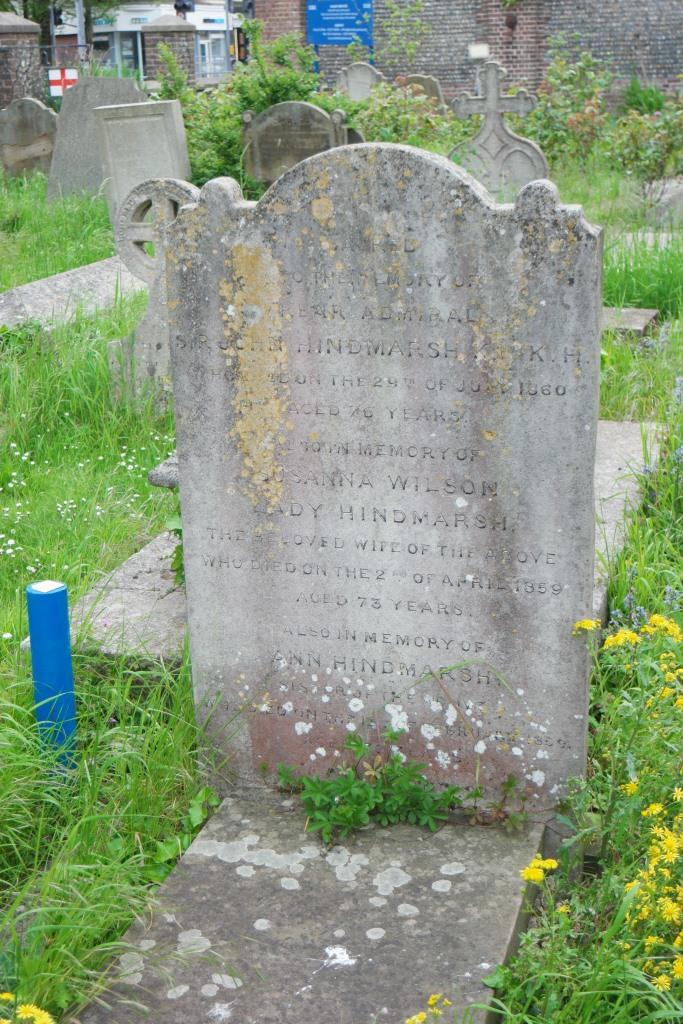
Headstone of Hindmarsh in St. Andrew's Churchyard in Hove, East Sussex.

Hindmarsh lived at 30 Albany Villas in Hove for a number of years, where there is now a blue plaque in his honour. Rear-Admiral Sir John Hindmarsh died in London on 29 July 1860 and is buried in the grounds of St Andrew's Church, Hove.

== Marriage and children ==
John Hindmarsh (1785 – 29 July 1860) married Susanna Wilson Edmeades (1786 – 2 April 1859), daughter of Henry Dickson Edmeades, on 4 November 1809 at St Nicholas' Church, Strood, Kent. Their children were:

- Susanna Hindmarsh (29 December 1810 – 24 August 1882) married John Ellis (c. 1803 – 22 March 1873), a South Australian pastoralist. She was his second wife.
- Jane Hindmarsh (8 May 1814 – 8 May 1874) married Alfred Miller Mundy (9 January 1809 – 29 March 1877), MP of Shipley Hall, Derbyshire, and cousin of the Duke of Newcastle. He was a South Australian MLC from 1843 to 1849.

- Maria Jane Mundy ( – 30 August 1902) married Sir (Edmund) Constantine Henry Phipps (15 March 1840 – 15 March 1911), British diplomat, on 7 October 1863

- Sir Eric Clare Edmund Phipps (27 October 1875 – 13 August 1945), also a British diplomat.

- Nellie Hindmarsh Miller Mundy (1844 – 27 June 1912) married Charles John Addington (17 March 1832 – 11 September 1903)
- Alfred Edward Miller Mundy (28 November 1849 – )

- Mary Hindmarsh (22 August 1817 – 27 December 1887) married George Milner Stephen (18 December 1812 – 16 January 1894), barrister of the Middle Temple, Acting Governor and Colonial Secretary of South Australia, on 9 July 1840.
- John Hindmarsh (24 May 1820 – 4 August 1903) married Mary Long (1824 – 1871). He was a barrister of the Middle Temple and J.P. of Port Elliot, South Australia. He married again, to the widow Matilda Drew Absalom, née Leworthy ( – ) on 6 January 1872.

- John Hindmarsh (1858–1922)
- Alfred Humphrey Hindmarsh (18 April 1860 – 13 November 1918) was an MP and first Labour leader in New Zealand.
- Mary Susan Hindmarsh (1862 – 1937)
- George Felix Hindmarsh (1864–1909)

== Places named after John Hindmarsh ==
=== Adelaide ===
- Hindmarsh Square, Adelaide is an open space public park within the City of Adelaide.
- The Adelaide suburb of Hindmarsh was originally laid out as a speculative subdivision, the Village of Hindmarsh, on land owned by him. It was for many years the centre of a Local Government Area called the Town of Hindmarsh, which has now been amalgamated into the City of Charles Sturt
- The Governor Hindmarsh Hotel, or "The Gov", on Port Road, Hindmarsh, a popular live music venue.
- The Division of Hindmarsh federal electorate takes in the area near the proclamation site.

=== Regional SA ===
- The Hindmarsh River, which flows into Encounter Bay at Victor Harbor, rises in the locality named "Hindmarsh Valley" and over a waterfall named "Hindmarsh Falls" about 15 km from the river mouth.
- Hindmarsh Island is near the town of Goolwa, close to the Murray Mouth.

=== Interstate ===
- Lake Hindmarsh in the Wimmera region of western Victoria, Australia.
- Hindmarsh Drive runs through the districts of Weston Creek and South Canberra in Canberra, Australia.

== See also ==
- Historical Records of Australia
- Awake My Love - a play about Light and Hindmarsh
- O'Byrne, William Richard (1849). A Naval Biographical Dictionary . John Murray – via Wikisource.

== Notes ==
Government offices
New title State established	Governor of South Australia; 1836–1838	Succeeded by Lieutenant Colonel George Gawler
Previous: Sir Henry King	Lieutenant Governor of Heligoland; 1840–1857	Succeeded by Richard Pattinson
