= Roderick Matheson (disambiguation) =

Roderick Matheson may refer to:

- Roderick Matheson (1793–1873), Ontario businessman and Conservative member of the Senate of Canada
- Roderick N. Matheson (1824–1862), officer in the Union Army in the American Civil War
- Roderick Matheson (judge), judge in the Supreme Court of South Australia from 1979 to 1998
