= Sefton =

Sefton may refer to:

== Places ==
- Sefton, Merseyside, a village in Merseyside, England
  - Metropolitan Borough of Sefton, a metropolitan borough of Merseyside, England
- Sefton, New South Wales, a suburb of Sydney, Australia
- Sefton, New Zealand, a small settlement in New Zealand
- Sefton, a housing estate in Dún Laoghaire Borough, in County Dublin, Ireland
- Mount Sefton, a mountain close to Mount Cook in New Zealand's Southern Alps

== People ==
=== Given name ===
- Sefton Brancker (1877–1930), Air Vice Marshal
- Sefton Delmer (1904–1979), journalist
- Shabtai Rosenne (1917-2919), a Professor of International Law and an Israeli diplomat, birth name

=== Surname ===
- Allan Roy Sefton (1921–1989), Australian ornithologist and environmentalist
- Amanda Sefton, Marvel Comics character
- Ann Elizabeth Sefton (born 1936), Australian neurologist and educator
- Clyde Sefton (born 1951), cyclist
- Fred Sefton (1888–1976), basketball coach

== Other ==
- Sefton Coast, Site of special scientific interest
- Sefton (army horse), a horse (survivor of a terrorist bombing in 1982)
- Sefton (racehorse), winner of the 1878 Epsom Derby
- Sefton Metropolitan Borough Council, the governing body of the borough
- Earl of Sefton, part of the Peerage of Ireland
- Sefton, a cultivar of Agrostis capillaris (Common Bentgrass) developed in New Zealand

== See also ==
- 7552 Sephton, an asteroid
