= Wahlqvist =

Wahlqvist is a Swedish surname. Notable people with the surname include:

- Johnny Wahlqvist (c. 1973 – 2017), Swedish powerlifter
- Lars Wahlqvist (born 1964), Swedish cyclist
- Linus Wahlqvist (born 1996), Swedish footballer
- Mark Wahlqvist (born 1942), Australian physician
- Victor Wahlqvist (born 1991), Swedish ice hockey player
