= 2000 Australia Day Honours =

The 2000 Australia Day Honours are appointments to various orders and honours to recognise and reward good works by Australian citizens. The list was announced on 26 January 2000 by the Governor General of Australia, Sir William Deane.

The Australia Day Honours are the first of the two major annual honours lists, the first announced to coincide with Australia Day (26 January), with the other being the Queen's Birthday Honours, which are announced on the second Monday in June.

== Order of Australia ==
=== Companion (AC) ===
==== General Division ====
Recipient	Citation	Notes
Professor Geoffrey Norman Blainey	For service to academia, research and scholarship, and as a leader of public debate at the forefront of fundamental social and economic issues confronting the wider community	
Frank P Lowy	For service to the community through the development of the property industry and expansion of the retail sector in Australia and internationally, and as philanthropist committed to support of wide-ranging social and cultural endeavours	

=== Officer (AO) ===
==== General Division ====
Recipient	Citation	Notes
Professor Henry Brodaty	For service to the health and well-being of older people in the community as a leader in dementia care through the Alzheimer's Association, both nationally and internationally, and to medicine through contributions to the specialty of old age psychiatry and academic and research knowledge in psychogeriatrics	
Dr Donald Patrick Cameron	For service to medicine, particularly in the fields of endocrinology and diabetes research, and as a clinician, teacher and administrator	
Bernal Tasman Cuthbertson	For service to the community, particularly through the promotion of Tasmania's and Australia's maritime history, to the training of naval cadets, and to the business sector through assisting the development of the cray and abalone fishery industries	
Professor David Morritz de Kretser	For service to medicine, particularly in the field of male reproductive biology, and as a researcher, educator and university administrator	
Denis Patrick Glennon	For service to environmental protection through the management, control and treatment of industrial and hazardous waste, and to the community	
Bruce Gyngell	For service to the media, particularly the development of the television industry in Australia and overseas, and to raising awareness of the social responsibility of the industry to meet community expectations	
His Excellency The Honourable David Anthony Hunt	For service to the judiciary, to the law and to the community particularly in the areas of criminal law, the law of defamation, and international law in defence of human rights	
Betty Dorothy Johnson	For service to the community as a consumer advocate in the areas of aged care and related health issues, to the Older Women's Network (Australia) and to the Australian Pensioners' and Superannuants' Federation	
The Reverend John Aylmer Leaver	For service to education, particularly through the establishment of the Victorian System of Ecumenical Schools and the Association of Christian Community Colleges, and to the community through the Anglican Church and the Army Reserve	
The Honourable Thomas Lancelot Lewis	For service to the Parliament of New South Wales, to the environment as the founder of the National Parks and Wildlife Service of New South Wales, and to the community	
Robert Cecil Mansfield	For service to Australian business and economic development and to the telecommunications industry	
Professor Raoul John Mortley	For service to tertiary education, particularly as an administrator, and to the humanities in the fields of philosophy and ancient history	
Jack Mundey	For service to the identification and preservation of significant sections of Australia's natural and urban heritage through initiating Green Bans and through the Historic Houses Trust of New South Wales	
Professor Stella Rayner O'Donnell	For service to the advancement of pharmaceutical science, particularly in the field of pharmacology, to research and development in relation to asthma therapy and to the community	
Robert William Piper	For service to business and commerce, and to the community through broad based charitable, arts, heritage and sporting organisations	
Thomas Alfred Pyne	For service as a leader in local government in Australia, to business as a contributor to the development of the Cairns region as an international tourist destination and to the community through fundraising initiatives to support Australian athletes competing at the Year 2000 Sydney Olympic Games	
Neville Joseph Roach	For service to business, particularly in the information technology industry, and as a contributor to the development of Australian multiculturalism	
Emeritus Professor Ruth Lynette Russell	For service to nursing, particularly as an educator and administrator, and to the research and recording of the history of nursing	
Professor Ann Elizabeth Sefton	For service to medical education, particularly in the area of reform and the development of a graduate medical programme, and to physiology and research in the field of neuroscience through the study of the function and structure of the visual pathways of the brain	
Dr Andrew Sydney Thomas	For service to science and technology through the National Aeronautics and Space Administration (NASA) programme as an astronaut and for contributions to the human exploration of space	
Professor Mark Lawrence Wahlqvist	For service to medicine, particularly in the field of human nutrition and public health, and as a contributor to the International Union of Nutrition Sciences, the World Health Organisation's Nutrition Committee and the Australian Nutrition Foundation	

==== Military Division ====
Branch	Recipient	Citation	Notes
Navy	Vice Admiral David John Shackleton	For distinguished service to the Australian Defence Force and to the Royal Australian Navy in demanding command and staff appointments	
Army	Major General Peter John Abigail	For distinguished service to the Australian Defence Force and to the Australian Army in high level staff appointments	
Air Force	Air Vice-Marshal Robert Bruce Treloar	For distinguished service to the Royal Australian Air Force in the field of Personnel Management Policy and as the Commander of the Integrated Air Defence System	

=== Member (AM) ===
==== General Division ====
Recipient	Citation	Notes
Robert Alfred Angove	For service to local government and to the community, particularly through environmental, music, church and service groups	
Ronald Thomas Banks	For service to the community through charitable, sport, arts and business organisations	
Gregory Bartels	For service to the community, particularly through business and professional associations, to local and state government instrumentalities, and to organisations fostering health, education and welfare programmes in developing countries	
Commissioner Brian Charles Bates	For service to community safety as Commissioner of Police and Head of the Fire and Emergency Service of the Northern Territory	
Professor Richard John Bawden	For service to agricultural education, particularly in the application of systemic development to overcome complex problems in the management of natural resources and rural development both in Australia and overseas	
William Ronald Beetham	For service to medicine, particularly in the field of orthopaedics, and in the development of training programmes for overseas doctors, and to the community	
Nicholas Begakis	For service to business and export development in South Australia as a member of a range of government and industry advisory boards, and to the community	
Dr Fraser John Bergersen	For service to scientific research in the field of microbiology, particularly through the study of symbiotic nitrogen fixation in legumes leading to improved crop performance in Australia and Asia	
Graham Thomas Blewitt	For service to international humanitarian law, particularly in the area of war crimes investigation	
Catherine Frances Bonnes	For service to people with hearing impairments in the Broken Hill area, and as a contributor nationally through the National Deafness Forum of Australia, the National Disability Advisory Council and the Hearing Services Advisory Committee	
Dr Rita Joan Brassil	For service to the visual arts in Australia and overseas as a sculptor	
Graeme Harold Brien	For service to public health through fundraising programmes for cancer research, the promotion of campaigns aimed at raising public awareness of cancer, and the improvement of patient education and care	
Clive Reginald Broadbent	For service to the promotion of environmental health and safety in the field of mechanical building services, particularly the occurrence of legionella bacteria in cooling towers	
Dr Wendy Elizabeth Brodribb	For service to medicine and community health as a lactation consultant, educator and counsellor in the advancement of the care of breastfeeding mothers and their babies, and to the Nursing Mothers Association of Australia	
Alan John Broome	For service to the Australian mining industry, particularly in the areas of research and development through the Australian Coal Industry Research Laboratory, and to international trade through Austmine	
Francis Martin Buckle	For service to the community, particularly as a philanthropist, and to the finance industry	
Kenneth Donald Buckley	For service to the community as an advocate for civil liberties, human rights and social justice issues in Australia, particularly through the New South Wales Council for Civil Liberties	
Dr Richard John Burns	For service to medicine, particularly in the field of neurology, and to the community as a patron and professional contributor to groups providing support for people with neurological diseases	
Belinda Jane Clark	For service to cricket, particularly through the Australian Women's Cricket Team, and to the promotion and development of the game for women and girls	
Kenneth George Coles	For service to business and industry, particularly in the areas of technological innovation and education, and to the community	
Geraldine Dorothea Cox	For service to the welfare of children through the establishment, financing and administration of an orphanage in Cambodia	
Douglas John Cross	For service to archival administration and records management, to professional associations, and to the community through the facilitation of greater public access to genealogical records	
Peter Charles Cullen	For service to the community, particularly in the area of social welfare, the development of the RecLink programme providing recreational opportunities for the socially disadvantaged and those with substance abuse problems	
Sean Christopher Dorney	For service to journalism as a foreign correspondent	
Berry Haworth Durston	For service to rowing as a competitor, manager, coach, referee and administrator	
Anthony Charles Falkland	For service to engineering and hydrology, particularly the management of fragile water resources in Pacific Island countries	
Richard Alan Flashman	For service to the motor trade industry, particularly through the Motor Trade Association of South Australia and in the area of industry training, and to the community	
Leah Ruby Francis	For service to visually impaired people, particularly in the field of education and in the integration of visually impaired children into mainstream education facilities	
Emeritus Professor Joseph Mark Gani	For service to mathematics, particularly in the field of statistics, and to research in the areas of applied probability and mathematical biology	
Dr Robert William Gee	For service to veterinary science, particularly as a leader in the development of improved standards of animal health and quarantine services	
Graeme Lindsay Goldsworthy	For service to the community, particularly through support of programmes providing employment and recreational opportunities for people with disabilities, and to the promotion and development of regional tourism and the hospitality industry	
Bruce John Goodluck	For service to the community, and to the Federal and Tasmanian Parliaments	
Valerie Margaret Grogan	For service to the international community, particularly through human rights movements and overseas aid activities, and through St John Ambulance Australia	
Judith Anne Hancock	For service to the education of girls, to educational administration through professional organisations, and to the community	
Neville James Howden	For service to the Australian Red Cross as a financial manager, as a contributor to the MATES programme and to the development of the organisation's Blood Service	
The Honourable Benjamin Charles Humphreys	For service to the Federal Parliament, particularly in the area of veterans' affairs	
Professor Soo Keat Khoo	For service to medicine in the field of obstetrics and gynaecology as a teacher, researcher, clinician and administrator	
Brian Henry Knowles	For service to the community, particularly through Rotary International's humanitarian relief work aimed at polio eradication	
Allan Jeffrey Langer	For service to Rugby League football as a player at national and international levels, and as a supporter of charities, particularly those raising funds for cancer research	
The Reverend Father John Peter Leary	For service to the spiritual, educational and health needs of the Aboriginal people of the Northern Territory as a priest and missionary of the Catholic Church	
Trevor John Leis	For service to the dairy industry in Tasmania, and to the harness racing industry as a breeder and competitor	
Cecil John Louttit	For service to the community, particularly through service, welfare, business and sporting organisations	
Kevin John Luscombe	For service to the advertising industry, to social welfare and community organisations through the provision of marketing advice, and to education	
Norman Douglas Lyall	For service to the law as a legal practitioner, and to professional development, particularly through the Law Society of New South Wales and the Law Council of Australia	
Dr Robert Ian Mair	For service to engineering, particularly professional education, through the Institution of Engineers Australia, and to the expansion of Australia's engineering industry in Asia	
Dr Jeffrey Gordon Mann	For service to the law, particularly in the areas of taxation law, legal reform and education, and to the community	
Professor Robin Marks	For service to medicine in the field of dermatology, and to public health, particularly the promotion of skin cancer and melanoma awareness	
Associate Professor Peter Blake Marshall	For service to medicine, particularly through the development of the Centre for Perinatal and Neonatal Medicine at the Flinders Medical Centre, and to education in the fields of neonatology and paediatrics	
The Honourable Roderick Grant Matheson	For service to the law and to the community, particularly through the Bedford Industries Rehabilitation Association, the Law Society of South Australia, the Art Gallery of South Australia Foundation and St Mark's College Council	
Dr David James McClay	For service to education in the Northern Territory as a school teacher and as a contributor to the development of Batchelor College as a leading centre for adult indigenous education	
Dr Bronwyn Anne Mellor	For service to English education in Australia and overseas through the authorship and publication of innovative texts on literature, and as a teacher at secondary and tertiary levels	
James Gordon Moffatt	For service to the community, particularly to medical research and charitable organisations as a financial adviser and administrator, and to local government	
Dr John Moriarty	For service to the Aboriginal and Torres Strait Islander community through political advocacy and the promotion of indigenous culture, and to business	
Fay Theresa Nelson	For service to the promotion and development of Aboriginal and Torres Strait Islander art and culture	
Vincent John O'Rourke	For service to the rail transport industry, particularly through the restructuring of Queensland Rail, and as a contributor for the inauguration of the Australasian Railway Association	
Raymond Edward Parkin	For service to Australian war literature through autobiographical works, and to historical research as author of HM Bark Endeavour	
Alan Francis Parry	For service to the credit union movement, particularly through the World Council of Credit Unions and the establishment of the Education Credit Union Co-operative Limited (Ed Credit)	
William Frederick Penfold	For service to the community, particularly through the Prince of Wales Medical Research Institute, the Royal Blind Society and Rotary International, and through the reproduction and publication of historic cartographic works	
Royce Reginald Pepin	For service to international aid programmes through Project Concern International, United Way International and the Multilateral Middle East Initiative, and to the community	
John Maurice Pinney	For service to the Australian Red Cross as an administrator and as a contributor to the election of the Australian Society to the Executive Council of the Federation of Red Cross	
Dr Andrew James Pirie	For service to the development of the wine industry and tourism in Tasmania	
Brother Columbanus Neil Pratt	For service to the Catholic education system at secondary and tertiary levels and as an educational administrator in Australia and the Philippines	
Lesley Denise Purdom	For service to local government in South Australia, and to the community, particularly through educational advisory bodies and service clubs	
Mignon Marie Rasch	For service to youth and to international relations through AFS Intercultural Programs	
David John Rathman	For service to Aboriginal affairs, particularly in the development and delivery of South Australian government services in the areas of education and community welfare	
Ieuan Roberts	For service to the coal mining industry, particularly in the development and promotion of health and safety standards	
Associate Professor Rosemary Feilding Roberts	For service to medical record administration, particularly in the development of national coding standards, and as a contributor for the introduction of casemix classifications in health care	
Richard George Rockliff	For service to the community, particularly through agricultural and arts organisations in Tasmania, and to local government	
Leslie Paul Scheinflug	For service to soccer as a national player and coach	
Professor Robin Lorimer Sharwood	For service to the Anglican Church of Australia, particularly in the area of canon law, and to legal education	
Diane Shteinman	For service to the Jewish community, particularly through the Executive Council of Australian Jewry	
Roslyn Claire Sinclair	For service to the community of Maleny, particularly as an initiator of and contributor to a range of educational, welfare, service and health groups	
Professor Larry Sitsky	For service to music as a composer, musicologist, pianist and educator	
Dr John Havelock Southwick	For service to the dental profession, particularly through the Australian Dental Association, and to the Australian Council of Professions	
Christopher John Stewart	For service to business, particularly the banking and film industries, and to the community	
Norma Lesley Symington	For service to people with dementia and their carers, particularly through the Alzheimers Association of New South Wales and the Alzheimers Carer Support Group in Turramurra	
Ian Edward Taylor	For service to the Victorian Ambulance Service, to Australian Rules football, particularly as an administrator in the country competition, and to the community	
James William Thomson	For service to the welfare of children and youth in Victoria, particularly through Anglicare and Opportunity Youth Services	
Gregory John Vickery	For service to the community, particularly through the Australian Red Cross, to the law and to legal education	
Timothy Alexander Walker	For service to performing arts administration, particularly as General Manager of the Australian Chamber Orchestra	
Richard James Watson	For service to the business sector as a company director and through the Tasmanian Chamber of Commerce and Industry and the Australian Institute of Company Directors, to aquaculture and to sport, particularly snow skiing	
Councillor John Haydon Wearne	For service to local government, particularly at state and national levels, and to the community through conservation, arts and sporting organisations	
Barry Dodd Webb	For service to electrical engineering, particularly in the area of lighting as a consultant and lecturer	
Peter Ian Whelan	For service to public health, particularly in the Northern Territory in the prevention of mosquito-borne diseases through programmes to monitor and control mosquito populations	
Dr Guy Kendall White	For service to low temperature physics, particularly as a former Chief Research Scientist with the CSIRO, and through scientific publications and teaching	
Dr Eric Clifford Wigglesworth	For service to the promotion of public health through The Sir Robert Menzies Memorial Foundation, and to accident prevention	
Alexander Ross Wilson	For service to metallurgy, particularly through the Australian Institute for Non-Destructive Testing, and to the health and safety of persons working in the industrial radiography area of the metals industry	
Janis Dickson Wittber	For service to youth, particularly through Guides Western Australia and Guides Australia, and to the community	
The Reverend Richard Frank Wootton	For service to the Uniting Church in Australia, and to the community as an advocate for human rights and social justice issues nationally and world-wide	

==== Military Division ====
Branch	Recipient	Citation	Notes
Navy	Commander Desmond John Carney	For exceptional service to the Royal Australian Navy as the principal adviser to the Naval Training Commander on training systems issues	
Navy	Commodore John Henry McCaffrie	For exceptional service to the Royal Australian Navy in the fields of Strategic Policy and Higher Management	
Army	Colonel Brian Robert Dawson	For exceptional service to the Australian Army in the fields of Operations, Logistics and Administration	
Army	Colonel Mark Andrew Kelly	For exceptional service to the Australian Army in demanding command and staff appointments, particularly as Commanding Officer of the 1st Battalion, the Royal Australian Regiment, and as the Chief of Staff at Deployable Joint Force Headquarters	
Army	Lieutenant Colonel Ronald James Morley	For exceptional service to the Australian Army, particularly through the activities of the Aboriginal and Torres Strait Islander Commission/Army Community Assistance Project	
Army	Brigadier Robert Edward Walford	For exceptional service to the Australian Army and to the Australian Defence Force as the Commanding Officer/Chief Instructor of the School of Army Aviation and as the Commander of the Aviation Support Group	
Army	Colonel Richard Gary Wilson	For exceptional service to the Australian Army and to the Australian Defence Force as the Commanding Officer of the 2nd/4th and 2nd Battalions, the Royal Australian Regiment, and as the Chief Staff Officer Plans at Headquarters Australian Theatre	
Air Force	Air Vice-Marshal Colin McKenzie Hingston	For exceptional service to the Australian Defence Force in the field of Strategic Logistics and, in particular, as Head National Support	
Air Force	Air Commodore Roger Jon Pike	For exceptional service to the Royal Australian Air Force in the fields of Aircraft Maintenance and Logistics	
Air Force	Air Commodore Geoffrey David Shepherd	For exceptional service to the Royal Australian Air Force in the field of Operations, particularly as the Officer Commanding of Number 82 Wing	

=== Medal (OAM) ===
==== General Division ====
Recipient	Citation	Notes
Barrie John Aarons	For service to the community of Hamilton and to medicine	
Dr Lewsbe George Abbott	For service to medicine in the field of dermatology, particularly through the Australasian College of Dermatologists, to the arts and to veterans and their families	
Pamela Abbotts	For service to people with disabilities, particularly as the founder and Chief Executive Officer of Recreation Network	
Purachattra Abey	For service to the Sri Lankan community in Queensland	
John Agnew	For service to music, education and youth, particularly through the ACT Instrumental Music Programme and bands	
Graham Thomas Alderman	For service to the community, particularly through the Chartered Institute of Transport in Australia, and to Rotary International	
Franklin John Alexander	For service to the communities within the Kiama region, particularly through the NSW Rural Fire Service and the State Emergency Service, and to the Scouting movement	
Alan George Anderson	For service to the community, particularly through the Armed Merchant Cruiser and Landing Ship Association and the Royal Blind Society, and to surf lifesaving	
John Venn Andrew	For service to sailing, particularly in the 16ft Skiff class	
Graeme Keith Andrews	For service to the preservation and promotion of Australian maritime history as a researcher and author, and through the Sydney Maritime Museum	
lma Ellen Archer	For service to the community of Bankstown, particularly though Meals on Wheels and the Greenacre Ladies Bowling Club	
Barry Ernest Armstrong	For service to youth, particularly through the Scouting movement	
Doris Catherine Athanasio	For service to women in the Maltese community, through the Maltese Australian Women's Association and the establishment of the Liverpool Maltese Women's Group	
Lenard William Atkins	For service to the promotion and development of the game of squash, particularly as an administrator, coach and player	
Norman William Austin	For service to the establishment and development of the Redland Museum, and to the community	
Jeffrey John Barlow	For service to veterans, particularly through the Insurance Sub-Branch of the Returned and Services League of Australia	
Karen Maree Barnett	For service to the community, particularly through housing programmes in the St Kilda and Port Phillip areas	
Garry James Barnsley	For service to the community of the Southern Highlands	
Dawn Alexia Bartkwoski	For service to the community, particularly through the Geebung Returned and Services League Women's Auxiliary	
The Reverend Canon Lawrence Francis Bartlett	For service to the Anglican Church, particularly as a contributor to the ecumenical Hymn Book and the Australian Prayer Book	
Ruth Mary Baxendale	For service to the preservation of local and family history and heritage sites in the Willunga and McLaren Vale areas, and as Chairman of the Willunga Branch of the National Trust of South Australia	
Phyllis Ferguson Bennett	For service to the community, particularly through the Voluntary Aid Services Corps and the Australian Red Cross	
Vivian James Berresford	For service to local government, particularly through the Northern Midlands Council, and to the community	
Francis Dewar Bethwaite DFC	For service to sailing, particularly as a boat designer and as initiator of technical and experimental projects	
John Gregorius Beus	For service to community welfare, particularly through the Springvale Branch of the Society of St Vincent de Paul and the Springvale Benevolent Society	
James bin Jamin	For service to community health on the Cocos (Keeling) Islands, particularly as a medical and dental assistant	
Dr Andrew Barham Black	For service to conservation and the environment, to ornithology and to medicine, particularly in the field of epilepsy	
Josephine Marie Black	For service to education, particularly as Chairperson of the Corangamite District Adult Education Group, and to the community	
David Colin Blake	For service to the community, particularly through the Australian and New South Wales Cemeteries and Crematoria Associations	
Gloria Bouren	For service to the community, particularly as a fundraiser for charity, and to children with hearing and sight impairments through the Wollongong Lantern Club	
Dr Edwin John Boyce	For service to education, particularly as Principal of Pacific Hills Christian School	
Neville George Boyd	For service to ballroom dancing as a teacher, examiner, adjudicator and lecturer	
Dr Maximilian Brandle	For service to education, particularly as Director of the Institute of Modern Languages, to the community through the National Accreditation Authority for Translators and Interpreters, and to multiculturalism	
Donald George Bradshaw	For service to the community, particularly in the field of rehabilitation for those with drug and alcohol addictions	
Elizabeth Merle Bradwell	For service to women, particularly through Soroptimist International and the Returned Sisters Sub-Branch of the Returned and Services League of Australia, and to the community	
Margaret Dorothy Brooke	For service to the community of Benalla through the performing and visual arts, particularly as a flautist	
Neville Brooke	For service to the aged, particularly in the development of health and welfare services	
Enid Marie Burge	For service to children with sight and hearing impairments, particularly through the St George Lantern Club	
John Cuthbertson Burrell	For service to the community, particularly through the establishment of the Cork Project, and to veterans and their families	
Yvonne Rhonda Burton	For service to the community, particularly through Meals on Wheels	
Shirley Eileen Butler	For service to nursing and the community, particularly through the implementation of programmes and services for people with sensory impairments	
Kevin Robert Byrne	For service to the community of Caboolture, particularly through charitable organisations	
Raymond Anthony Callaghan	For service to athletics, particularly through the Australian Association of Veterans Athletics Clubs and the Victorian Veterans Athletic Club	
Charles Arthur Campbell	For service to the community, particularly through St John Ambulance Australia, the National Trust of Australia and the Australiana Fund	
Melva Lorraine Campbell	For service to the community, particularly as a fundraiser through the Mildura Base Hospital Ladies Auxiliary and the Mildura Auxiliary of the Multiple Sclerosis Society of Victoria	
Owen Colin Campbell	For service to the community by raising public awareness of the Sandakan tragedy	
Sophie Shoshanah Caplan	For service to the Jewish community, particularly in the areas of genealogy and historical research	
John Gennaro Caputo	For service to the Italian community, to the community of Warringah, and to local government	
Gavin Boyd Carpenter	For service to the community of the Barkly region, particularly in the areas of regional development and tourism	
Stephen Alexander Carr	For service to figure skating as a competitor at Australian and World Championships, and to the Olympic Movement	
Annia Castan	For service to the Jewish community, particularly through philanthropic contributions and support for programmes and services for children with disabilities	
Cynthia Despa Chamberlain	For service to youth through Guides Australia, and to the community	
Max Chester	For service to the community, particularly through the Rotary Club of Heidelberg, to local government, and to architecture	
Dr Clement Byrne Christesen	For service to the development of Australian creative and critical writing as founder and editor of Meanjin Quarterly	
Muriel Claire Christie	For service to youth, particularly through Guides Australia	
Gladys Churcher	For service to the community through the welfare programmes of the Canberra Baptist Church and the ACT Hospice Palliative Care Society	
Colin Frederick Clark	For service to sport, particularly through the Queensland Touch Association, and to the community through the Scouting movement and the State Emergency Service	
Honor Dell Cleary	For service to the Aboriginal communities of Cherbourg and Brisbane	
Kathleen Olga Cockcroft	For service to the community, particularly through voluntary and charitable organisations	
Clare Colless	For service to the community, particularly through musical groups in the Coonamble and Gold Coast Areas	
Brian Anthony Collins	For service to the community, particularly through the Children's Cancer Institute Australia for Medical Research	
James Kevin Colwell	For service to veterans, particularly through the Curranulla Day Care Club and the Cronulla Sub-Branch of the Returned and Services League of Australia	
Florence Ellen Cooper	For service to the community, particularly through the Ngala Family Resource Centre	
Raymond John Cooper	For service to Australian Rules football and to the community	
Gwenith Mary Coulter	For service to women's health, particularly through the Orange and District Breast Cancer Support Service, and to the community	
Charles William Cowper	For service to the welfare of veterans and their families, particularly through the Adamstown Sub-Branch of the Returned and Services League of Australia	
Charles Thomas Cripps	For service to the community, particularly through the Northampton Lions Club and fundraising activities for local organisations	
Betty Lorraine Croker	For service to the community, particularly through the Country Women's Association, the Anglican Church and the Crookwell Mammography Appeal	
Nina Alison Crone	For service to education, particularly as Headmistress of Melbourne Girls Grammar School	
Barry Francis Cronin	For service to the community of the Gold Coast region, particularly through Group Training Australia Human Resources Limited	
Ruth Helénè Cross	For service to the communities of Geelong and Barwon, particularly through the Australian Red Cross	
Graham John Crouch	For service to the milk and fish marketing industries, and to the community	
Ronald Henry Culbert	For service to veterans and their families and to the community through the Brisbane City Mission	
Dr Edward Kevin Cullen	For service to public health through the provision of palliative care services, and to medicine, particularly in the field of geriatric medicine	
John Dalton	For service to the community, through service, social welfare and overseas aid groups	
Heather Dawn Davidson	For service to nursing, particularly through the New South Wales College of Nursing, the Institute of Nurse Administrators of NSW and ACT, and the Australian Council of Health Care Standards	
Dr Alwyn Gerald Davies	For service to Rotary International aid programmes, particularly the Surplus Medicines and Medical Equipment Scheme and the Sight Restoration Programme for Indonesia, and as a general medical practitioner	
Lieutenant Colonel Rodney Francis Davis	For service to the community of Armidale, particularly through the New England Regional Art Museum	
Clarence Charles Daw	For service to the community of Ravensthorpe through sporting, social and welfare organisations	
The Reverend James Arthur Dawes	For service to the Uniting Church in Australia as a minister and a missionary	
Gregory John Dempsey	For service to opera and as a teacher and adjudicator	
David Derick Denton	For service to the community, particularly through the provision of telecommunication and security advice for public events	
The Reverend Michael Deutsch	For service to the Jewish community, particularly as the Cantor and a Minister of the Temple Emanuel	
David Henry Dial	For service to the community of the Hunter region, particularly through compiling material on local involvement in the Boer War and World War I, and through the Scouting movement	
William MacLean Dinnie	For service to local government, and to the community of Dalwallinu	
Harold Arthur Doig	For service to education, particularly through the development of mathematics programmes and curricula, and to the community	
Lesley Jean Doncon	For service to the community, particularly as a pianist, music teacher and choral conductor	
Douglas Donovan	For service to the community through the Moonah West Branch of the Naval Association of Australia and sporting groups	
Sister Mary Helen Dowler	For service to community health and welfare in the areas of pastoral and palliative care in the Orange and Bathurst region, and to education	
Claude Edmund Downs	For service to lawn bowls and to the community of Mount Gambier	
Margaret Ann Eaton	For service to people with intellectual disabilities, particularly through the Northgate Workshop of the Endeavour Foundation	
Reverend John Herbert Edmonstone	For service to religion and the community, particularly through the Baptist Church	
Eric Geoffrey Edwards	For service to the Hellenic community of Western Australia, particularly through the establishment of the Prevelly Chapel	
Philip William English	For service to local government and to primary industry, particularly dairy farming	
Dr John Watson Failes	For service to the community of Armidale, particularly through church and service organisations, and to local government	
Joseph Richard Fairweather	For service to veterans through the City of Parramatta Sub Branch of the Returned and Services League of Australia, and to the community	
Kenneth John Falkenmire	For service to cricket, particularly through the Emu Club, the Tamworth District Cricket Association and the North West Cricket Council	
Frank Farina	For service to soccer as a player and coach	
Margaret Lorraine Feeney	For service to veterans, particularly through the New South Wales Branch of the War Widows' Guild of Australia	
Kathleen Mary Fergusson	For service to local government and to the communities of Glamorgan and Spring Bay	
Robert John Fernance	For service to hockey in the Newcastle area	
Dr Joyce Eleanor Fildes	For service to the community, particularly through the Zonta Club of Canberra and the ACT Chapter of the Australian Federation of University Women	
Angela Maria Finnegan	For service to music as a pianist, organist, accompanist and teacher	
Raymond Maxwell Fisher	For service to Australian Rules football in the Lexton district	
Joseph John Fleming	For service to the community, particularly through the Society of St Vincent de Paul	
Enid Winter Fraser	For service to the community through the Australian Red Cross and the Peninsula and Red Hill Hospice Auxiliaries	
Robert Bryan Fryer	For service to the community, particularly to people with intellectual disabilities through Challenge Southern Highlands Incorporated and the Welby Garden Centre	
Leslie Gordon Gaffney	For service to veterans, particularly through the establishment of the Tamworth Sandakan and World War II Memorials	
Mary Hannah Gaffney	For service to the community, particularly the aged, through the Gaffney House Ladies Auxiliary Group	
Dorothy Blanche Gamble	For service to diving, particularly through the New South Wales Diving Association	
Reginald Harry Gardner	For service to the community, particularly through the Rotary Club of Kogarah and the Technical Aid to Disabled (TAD), and to recreational sailing through the Botany Bay Yacht Club	
Walter Gherardin	For service to children, particularly through the Gordon Homes for Boys and Girls	
Joyce Mary Gibberd	For service to conservation and the environment, particularly through the St Peters Tree Advisory Group, and to the community	
Yvonne Gloria Gibbons	For service to the community of Strathfield, particularly as a fundraiser for service and welfare groups, and in the recording and preserving of oral histories	
Craig Austin Goozee	For service to the community, particularly as a fundraiser for research into childhood cancer	
Robin Gregory Gordon	For service to the pipe band movement as an administrator and tutor	
Alastair Kinnaird Gordon	For service to athletics, particularly as a coach, administrator and competitor	
Richard Leonard Goss	For service to the community of Narrandera through sporting, aged care and welfare organisations	
John Edwin Greig	For service to the real estate industry and to the community	
Erica Muir Greig	For service to people with disabilities through the Corroboree Club	
Edmund Herbert Grohn	For service to the community of Bundaberg through service, education and welfare groups	
Michael Graeme Groom	For service to mountaineering	
Gillian Hagger	For service to the community, particularly through the Katherine Branch of the Australian Red Cross	
Beverley May Halburd	For service to youth, particularly through Guides Australia, and to the community	
Betty Christina Hall	For service to the community, particularly through the Crookwell and District Historical Society, youth, church and welfare organisations, and to local government	
Dorothy Hamilton	For service to local government, to the cattle industry, and to the community of Eidsvold	
Alexander Laurence Hamlyn	For service to local government, particularly in the areas of land and water management	
William Donald Harper	For service to music as a jazz violinist, composer and teacher of jazz	
Paul William Harragon	For service to Rugby League football as a player, and to the community	
The Venerable John Douglas Harrower	For service to the community through the Anglican Church and as a missionary	
Valma Mary Harvey-Hamilton	For service to the aged as a provider of outreach musical entertainment, and as a volunteer for nursing homes and pensioner associations	
Joan Macedon Heatley	For service to the community of the Burdekin region, through social welfare and education groups	
Olga Dorothy Hedemann	For service to nursing and health care administration, to the Army Reserve through the Royal Australian Army Nursing Corps, and to the community	
Hans Erwin Heer	For service to the Swiss community, particularly through the Swiss Society of Queensland	
Gordon Herbert Hill	For service to the community, particularly in establishing The Sydney Morsecodians Fraternity	
The Reverend Alexander Mackenzie Hilliard	For service to veterans through the RAN Corvettes Association, to the Uniting Church in Australia, and to the community	
Monsignor John Maurice Hoare	For service to the Catholic Church, particularly the Canberra Goulburn Archdiocese as Vicar-General and Chancellor	
Peter Rex Hobson	For service to aviation, particularly through the Royal Victorian Aero Club, and to people with disabilities through the EW Tipping Foundation	
Harry Hoffman	For service to the community as a philanthropist supporting social welfare groups and educational institutions	
Leila Shirley Hoffman	For service to the community through the campaign for equal pay, the establishment of the West Australian Young Readers' Book Award and the Perth Torah Education Centre Library	
Averil Gertrude Holt	For service to the community of Brighton and to the identification, recording and preservation of historical and heritage items in South Australia	
Mohammad Nurul Huq	For service to the community, particularly through the Islamic Society of the Northern Territory, the Australian Federation of Islamic Councils and as Imam of the Darwin Muslim community	
Cyril Keith Ingram	For service to botany, particularly through the collection and documentation of plant species, and furthering the knowledge of native flora	
Margery Irving	For service to the performing arts, particularly to theatre and radio, and to the community	
Terence Cecil Irwin	For service to veterans and their families, particularly through the Orange Sub-Branch of the Returned and Services League of Australia	
Robert Francis Isaacs	For service to Aboriginal communities in Western Australia, through housing administration and participation in instrumentalities concerned with health, welfare and education	
Frederick Thomas Ivory	For service to the community through the Commercial Representatives' and Agents Associations of Australia and Victoria	
Barbara Mary Jacobs	For service to the community, particularly through the Australian Red Cross	
Mona Rose Jacobsen	For service to the community, particularly through the Veterans and Family Support Link Line Incorporated, the Australian Red Cross and the Country Women's Association	
Ronald Edward James	For service to the community, particularly through the Victorian Concert Orchestra	
Florence Edith Jenkin	For service to the community, particularly through rehabilitation work for those with drug and alcohol addictions	
The Reverend Father Valerian Jenko	For service to the Slovenian Catholic community in Australia	
Peter Charles Joseph	For service to the community as Chairman of the Sisters of Charity Health Service Board in Darlinghurst and the St James Ethics Centre	
Lady Kaye	For service to the community through the Ecumenical Coffee Brigade	
Michael John Kennedy	For service to people with intellectual disabilities through Kurrajong-Waratah Industries and to the community of Wagga Wagga through service, school, church and cultural groups	
Alfred John Kitson	For service to the welfare of veterans and their families, particularly through the Naval Association of Australia	
Vaclav George Kolsky	For service to youth through the Scouting movement and to sport through the Illawarra Hockey and Sports Foundation	
Dennis Demosthenes Konidaris	For service to the community, particularly through the Australian Red Cross Appeal Committee, the Greek Orthodox Community of Frankston and Peninsula, and the Lefkadian Brotherhood Society	
Margaret Anne Lanz	For service to gymnastics as a competitor, judge, team manager and coach	
Geoffrey George Lascelles	For service to veterans and their families, particularly through the Hervey Bay Sub-Branch of the Returned and Services League of Australia, and to the community	
Marigold Mary Lawrence	For service to the conservation of the environment of the Central Coast region, and to the community	
John James Lesslie	For service to youth, particularly through the Order of DeMolay, and to the community	
Edward Arthur Lewis	For service to the community, particularly through Probus and the Victorian and Australian Overseas Foundation	
Lynette Joy Light	For service to social welfare in Ballarat and district, particularly through the Uniting Church Outreach Centre	
Bernard Benjamin Lofthouse	For service to the community of Harvey, particularly through service, aged care, ex-service and welfare groups	
Patricia Audrey Longworth	For service to the welfare of children with disabilities and their families, particularly through the co-ordination of early childhood intervention programmes in the northern suburbs of Sydney	
Francis Edward Luck	For service to the community of Rockhampton, particularly through the support of educational and artistic institutions, as a benefactor, and to tropical livestock importation	
Judith Haydon Mackay	For service to equestrian sports, particularly in camp drafting, show riding and dressage events	
Michael John Maher	For service to parliament at state and federal levels, and to the Maltese community of New South Wales	
Sister Clare Aileen Mahon	For service to community welfare, particularly through the Mathew Talbot Soup Van in Fitzroy, the Society of St Vincent de Paul and the Corpus Christi Community at Greenvale	
Angie Mai	For service to women in the Chinese community as founder of the Western Suburbs Chinese Women's Association	
Vincent Joseph Marinato	For service to the community of Watsons Bay, particularly in preserving the Italo-Australian heritage of the area by recording and documenting local history	
Maurice George Marks	For service to the community, particularly to the aged and people with disabilities through the Sir Joseph Banks Day Care Centre at Caringbah	
Dr Cyril Maxwell Martin	For service to the development of the food science and technology industries	
Arthur John Matthews	For service to veterans' tennis in Tasmania as a player, coach and administrator	
Edward Joseph McAlpine	For service to sport, particularly to Rugby League football, and to cricket	
Betty June McCrindle	For service to people with intellectual disabilities through the FOCAL Extended Management Committee, and to the community	
John Edward McCulloch	For service to youth, particularly through the Youth Hostels Association of Queensland and the Australian Youth Hostels Association	
Betty Margaret McDermott	For service to the community, particularly through the St Vincent de Paul Society's Marian Villa at Arncliffe	
David Allan McDonald	For service to the community of Atherton and district, particularly through the Masonic movement, the Queensland Cancer Fund, and sporting and charity organisations	
John Robert McFerran	For service to the television industry, particularly through the establishment of teletext services in Australia, and to the community	
Danielle Vanessa McGrath	For service to figure skating at Australian and World Championships, and to the Olympic movement	
Frederick Herbert McGrory	For service to surf lifesaving at club, regional, state and national levels	
Dr Mary McHugh	For service to medicine, particularly as a general practitioner in South Australia	
Alan John McKinney	For service to rural health, particularly through the Dubbo Base Hospital and the Hospital and Health Services Association of New South Wales	
Geoffrey Grantley McKinnon	For service to the media, to tourism, and to athletics	
Maxwell John McKowen	For service to sport as an administrator and sports trainer	
James Anthony McLeod	For service to the promotion of jazz music, through media broadcasts and encouraging Australian music composition and performance	
Susan McLeod	For service to nursing and professional education, particularly at the Royal Melbourne Hospital	
Neil Ambler McQualter	For service to the community of Benalla and district, particularly through the North Eastern Victorian and Benalla Ambulance Services, Benalla Rotary Club and the Benalla Regional Art Gallery	
Valerie Thame McRae	For service to the community, particularly through branches of the Australian Red Cross, Wyong Gorokan Meals on Wheels and the Inner Wheel Club of Toukley	
Malcolm Jeffrey Meikle	For service to the entertainment industry as a comedian and compere, and to the community as a fundraiser for charitable events	
Commodore Laurence Wilfrid Merson	For service to veterans and their families, particularly through the HMAS WARRAMUNGA Veterans' Association and the Naval Association of Australia	
Councillor Ivan Henry Middleton	For service to local government and to the community of Chinchilla	
Oliver Allan Moonie	For service to pedigree dog breeding associations, particularly through the Smooth Fox Terrier Association of New South Wales, and to the community	
Peter Moore	For service music as an instrumental bassoonist, conductor and director, and to music education	
Robert Christopher Moore	For service to youth, particularly through the South Australian Squadron Air Training Corps, and to gliding	
Maisie Morgan	For service to the community, particularly through the Red Cross Blood Bank in Melbourne and the St Kilda Branch of Red Cross	
Dr Geoffrey Claude Morlet	For service to medicine in the field of ophthalmology	
John Gilbert Morris	For service to the community, particularly veterans, through voluntary research assistance at the Australian War Memorial and in contributing to the establishment of the Hellfire Pass Memorial in Thailand	
Donald MacEwan Morrison	For service to the community, particularly the care of aged veterans through the Returned and Services League of Australia	
The Reverend Murray James Morton	For service to the community of the Southern Peninsula, particularly through the Food For All Program and Anglicare	
Dorothy Joyce Mowbray	For service to the community as a volunteer fundraiser for charities and community causes, particularly through the Board of Social Responsibility of the Uniting Church in Australia	
Kenneth Hugh Munro	For service to the community of the Darling Downs region, particularly through the University of Southern Queensland, St Andrews Hospital and the Toowoomba Chamber Music Society	
Louis Nade	For service to visually impaired people through the Royal Blind Society	
Leslie Keith Neal	For service to amateur wrestling and to youth as an administrator, coach and competitor	
William George Nethery	For service to the community of Tamworth, particularly through radio broadcasting, service and youth groups, and through the recording of the social history of the area	
Barbara Niemiec-Warcok	For service to the Polish community in Adelaide, particularly through the Polish Women's Association	
Kenneth Hugh Norris	For service to cycling for people with disabilities, particularly as a coach and administrator through the Australian Paralympic Preparation Programme	
Mavis Margaret O'Connor	For service to the community of Norwood through the Society of St Vincent de Paul	
Keith O'Dempsey	For service to secondary education in Queensland, and to the community	
Dr Margaret O'Grady	For service to medicine as a general practitioner in the Randwick area	
Eric George Orford	For service to the community of Toowoomba, particularly through tourism and economic development, and to the beverage industry	
Richard James Owens	For service to business through the Australian Family Business Network, and to the community	
Ronald John Palmer	For service to the community of Footscray, particularly through arts, sporting, service and environmental organisations	
John William Palmer	For service to conservation and the environment, particularly in the Gold Coast area	
Nicholas Joseph Papallo	For service to the Italian community, particularly through the San Giorgio Association of Sydney, the Italia Australia Association and the Italian Chamber of Commerce	
Ernest Augustus Parker	For service to veterans and their families, particularly through North Sydney and Chatswood Sub-Branches of the Returned and Services League of Australia, and through the organisation of lawn and indoor bowls programmes for the disabled	
Ronald Gordon Pate	For service to the community, particularly through the Scouting movement, Rotary International and the Royal Freemasons' Benevolent Institution of New South Wales	
John Oscar Paul	For service to veterans and their families, particularly through the Tasmanian Branch of the Returned and Services League of Australia	
Edward Gordon Pawson	For service to archery, particularly as a coach and administrator, and to the Adelaide Archery Club	
Arthur Dean Pearce	For service to veterans through the Catalina clubs of Australia	
Betty Macleod Pedersen	For service to the community, particularly through the Baulkham Hills Meals on Wheels and the Presbyterian Women's Association	
Ernest Edward Perkins	For service to conservation and the environment, particularly through the Field Naturalists Club, and to the community of Castlemaine	
José Amelia Petrick	For service to the preservation and recording of the history of Alice Springs as a writer and researcher, and to the community	
Glenville Ivan Pike	For service to the preservation and recording of the history of the pioneers of the Northern Territory and North Queensland as a writer and publisher	
Frank Pisani	For service to the community, particularly in the promotion of marine safety and safe boating practices through the Fremantle Volunteer Sea Rescue Group	
Valma Ellen Plant	For service to the community, particularly through the Traralgon Historical Society and the Walhalla Heritage League	
Joyce Leone Plater	For service to the community of Lower Clarence	
Angela Pong	For service to the Chinese community, particularly as the founding President of the Burwood Branch of the Chinese Elderly Welfare Association	
John Dexter Porter	For service to the community, particularly through Rugby Union football in the Illawarra district	
Ronald George Praite	For service to the community, particularly through research and preservation of the history of Unley	
Frank Presnell	For service to the community of Guyra, particularly as a fundraiser and volunteer for local organisations	
Maxwell Leonard Press	For service to sailing, particularly through the Yachting Association of New South Wales and the Australian Yachting Federation	
David Evan Price	For service to the community of Mornington, particularly through the Uniting Church in Australia and groups promoting social justice and local issues, and to the International Medical Mission	
Eric Colin Pursche	For service to the community of Manningham, particularly through ex-service and welfare groups	
Malini Devi Rasanayakam	For service to the Tamil community as the founder and Secretary of the Tamil Foundation	
Jill Reichstein	For service to the community and through the promotion and development of philanthropy in Australia, particularly through the Lance Reichstein Foundation	
Helen May Reid	For service to the community, particularly through Lifeline North Queensland	
Arthur Relf	For service to the aged through the Camden Haven Aged Care Association and the Laurieton Haven Retirement Village	
Colin Mayne Reynolds	For service to the community, particularly in support of research into childhood cancer through the Oncology Children's Foundation	
John Edward Riches	For service to youth, particularly through the Scouting movement and the Association of Southern Directions Youth Services	
Leslie Arthur Roberts	For service to the community as a church organist and as a fundraiser for charities	
Audria Eileen Rodgers	For service to the preservation and recording of local history through the Tamworth Historical Society, and to the community	
Philip John Rogers	For service to the community through the Clovercrest Swimming Club and Asthma South Australia	
Betty Eileen Ross	For service to the entertainment industry as an actor in radio, television and theatre and to industry members, through the Queensland Branch of the Media Entertainment and Arts Alliance and the Actors and Entertainers Benevolent Fund	
Kathleen Emily Ross	For service to veterans and their families in Tasmania through the War Widows Guild of Australia and the Returned and Services League Ladies Auxiliary, and to the community	
Dr Patricia Anne Ryan	For service to medicine as a general practitioner, and through the extension and improvement of medical services in the Shoalhaven area	
Dr William Philip Ryan	For service to medicine as a general practitioner and through the extension and improvement of medical services in the Shoalhaven area, and to forensic science through the Australasian and Pacific Area Association of Police Medical Officers	
Bernard John Sarroff	For service to aviation, particularly through the Royal Newcastle Aero Club, the Aircraft Owners and Pilots Association and the Australian Association of Flight Instructors	
Mary Ellen Saunders	For service to the community, particularly through the Oakleigh Centre for Intellectually Disabled Citizens, the Cheltenham Willing Workers and the Burwood Branch of the Country Women's Association	
Pasquale Scalzi	For service to the fruit and vegetable industry through the Adelaide Produce Markets Limited and the South Australian Chamber of Fruit and Vegetable Industries	
Jean Ethel Schlueter	For service to the community, particularly through the Country Women's Association, the Australian Red Cross, emergency service and sporting organisations	
Bettina Joyce Schneider	For service to the performing arts in Dubbo, particularly to ballet, and as a fundraiser for charity	
William Clifton Scott	For service to local government as President of Capel Shire Council, to the Western Australian Farmers Federation, and to the community	
Noreen Teresa Sear	For service to the community, particularly through the Asthma Foundation Learn to Swim programme at Ryde	
Paul Arthur Setchell	For service to the welfare of children through Save the Children	
Neville William Sharpe	For service to research in the small seeds industry and in plant variety trials, to water resource management and to the community	
Antony Stuart Shires	For service to people with disabilities, particularly through Technical Aid to the Disabled in New South Wales, and to the community	
John Allan Skinner	For service to the community, particularly through the Ambulance Services Welfare Fund and the Retired Ambulance Officers Association	
Colin John Slater	For service to the community, particularly the promotion of Australian music and artists and to singing in the Canberra region	
Stanley Edward Slipper	For service to educational administration, particularly through the Board of Trustees of the Ipswich Grammar School, and to the community	
Ethel Mary Smallwood	For service to the community of South Gippsland through health and aged care services and local government	
Ralph Foster Smart	For service to the development of the Australian film industry	
Donald Andrew Smith	For service to youth through the Queensland Branch of The Boys' Brigade and The Duke of Edinburgh's Award in Australia	
Geoffrey John Smith	For service to the protection and welfare of Australian fauna as a carer for sick and injured animals	
Kathleen May Smith	For service to youth through the Frankston Marching Girls Association	
Leslie William Smith	For service to youth through the Frankston Marching Girls Association	
Peter Malcolm Smith	For service to primary industry as a breeder, exhibitor and judge of poultry through the Show movement, to the Royal Agricultural Society of New South Wales, and to the horse breeding and racing industries	
Lieutenant Colonel Ross Smith	For service to veterans and their families, particularly as Chairman of the RSL Veterans Retirement Villages Foundation	
Christine Helen Smith	For service to the protection and welfare of Australian fauna as a carer for sick and injured animals	
Charles Edward Sparrow	For service to sailing, particularly as a designer of the Vaucluse Junior Sailing Boat (VJ)	
Ronald Gordon Spratt	For service to community health, through the environmental health and waste management industries	
Albert Edward Springett	For service to the communities of Bowral and Mittagong through service, tourist and business organisations	
John Erwin Stewart	For service to the law and to medical administration through the Medical Board of Victoria	
Noreen Dorothy Stokes	For service to music as a performer, teacher, examiner and accompanist	
Donnie Sutherland	For service to the music and entertainment industries, particularly the promotion of Australian performers, and to the community as a compere of fundraising events	
Keith Hubert Sutton	For service to people with intellectual and physical disabilities through Challenge Southern Highlands, and to the community	
Janet Ruth Tate	For service to the community, particularly in the promotion of older women's health, and as a fundraiser for charitable and heritage groups	
John Charles Taylor	For service to surf lifesaving, particularly through the Burleigh Heads Mowbray Park Surf Life Saving Club, and to the community	
Dr John Thomas	For service to the pharmacy profession, particularly through the continuing education of practising pharmacists	
William Glanville Thomas	For service to local government and to the community of Jamestown	
Dr Oswald Boaz Tofler	For service to the Jewish community of Western Australia, and to medicine, particularly in the field of cardiology	
John Clifford Tolley	For service to the preservation and recording of the history of South Australia, particularly as a researcher and writer	
John Vincent Toohey	For service to the community as a fundraiser and financial adviser for the Marist Brothers	
Thomas John Toohey	For service to veterans and their families, particularly through the Bundaberg Sub-Branch of the Rats of Tobruk Association, and to the community	
John William Toon	For service to veterans and their families, particularly in contributing to the establishment of a memorial at Hellfire Pass in Thailand, and to the community of Dandenong	
Professor Thomas Andrew Torda	For service to medicine, particularly research in the fields of anaesthesia and intensive care, and to education in hospitals and the University of New South Wales	
Nellie Eva Torrens	For service to the community of Tamworth, particularly through Meals on Wheels	
Richmond Thomas Torrens	For service to the community of Tamworth, particularly through Meals on Wheels	
Deborah Merle Tranter	For service to the promotion of tourism and the cultural heritage of the Darling Downs region	
Allan Hugh Tucker	For service to brass band music, particularly through the Launceston Railway Silver Band, to youth through the Air Training Corps, and to the community	
Beres Anne Turner	For service to the community, particularly as a teacher and adjudicator of speech and drama	
Daphne Rhoda Unicomb	For service to the community of the Hunter Valley region through social welfare, service, cultural and school groups	
John Graham Urquhart	For service to the liquid petroleum gas industry, and to children with disabilities through the Scouting movement	
Michael Lister Verco	For service to country horse racing, particularly as President of the Strathalbyn Racing Club	
Norma Viles	For service to veterans and their families, particularly through the Warilla Sub-Branch Women's Auxiliary of the Returned and Services League of Australia	
Barbara Helen Volk	For service to the community, particularly through the New South Wales Haemophilia Foundation, the Mark Fitzpatrick Trust and the Red Cross Blood Bank	
Pamela Lynette Walker	For service to the community, particularly through the Southern Heritage Singers, and as a music teacher	
Janet Audrey Walley	For service as a sports administrator, particularly to netball in Australia	
Leo William Walsh	For service to the community through the preservation and promotion of military history and heritage in Queensland, particularly through the Victoria Barracks Historical Society	
Raymond Mervyn Webster	For service to cricket, particularly through compiling and publishing statistics on Australian first-class cricket, and as a player, umpire and convener of umpiring	
Allan John Weeks	For service to the community, particularly through the Alexandra District Voluntary Ambulance Service	
lma Iris Westerway	For service to the community of the Central Coast region through charitable and service organisations	
Raymond William Wheeler	For service to veterans and their families, particularly through the Victorian Branch of the Ex-Prisoners of War Association of Australia, the Victorian Ex-Prisoners of War and Relatives Association, and the Returned and Services League of Australia	
Margaret Patricia White	For service to people with intellectual disabilities through the Endeavour Foundation	
Jean Christina Whitehouse	For service to nursing, particularly in the field of gerontology	
lma Jean Wightwick	For service to the aged and to people with disabilities, through the Canterbury Centre's Ladies Auxiliary and the Canterbury Senior Citizens' Club	
Ronald John Williams	For service to cricket, particularly through the Northern Tasmanian Cricket Association	
Joan Beatrice Williams	For service to people with physical and intellectual disabilities through the Cerebral Palsy League and the Intellectually Disabled Citizens Council	
Joan Williams	For service to the community of Ballina and district, particularly through the establishment of the Ballina Players, and through Quota International and welfare organisations	
Herbert Sydney Williams	For service to the welfare of children and infants as a foster parent	
Dulcie Edna Williams	For service to the welfare of children and infants as a foster parent	
Lynn Wilson	For service to the community, particularly as the founder, Secretary and Treasurer of the Australasian Tuberous Sclerosis Society	
Donald James Withers	For service to the community in the area of medical counter disaster planning	
Spencer Alston Witten	For service to the community, particularly through the Barraba District Hospital Board and Rotary, and to local government	
James William Young	For service to primary industry, particularly through the Bellarine Branch of the Victorian Farmers Federation and the Bellarine Land Care Group, and to the community	

==== Military Division ====
Branch	Recipient	Citation	Notes
Navy	Chief Petty Officer Ashley Grant Davis	For meritorious service to the Royal Australian Navy as an electronic Technician	
Navy	Chief Petty Officer Roderick William Dorian	For meritorious service to the Royal Australian Navy in the field of Logistics Support	
Navy	Commander Taufik Idrus	For meritorious service to the Royal Australian Navy while serving as the Squadron Engineer Officer within the Headquarters Australian Submarine Squadron	
Army	Warrant Officer Class One Peter Dorrell	For meritorious service to the Australian Army in the field of Works Engineering	
Army	Warrant Officer Class Two Shaun Patrick Hanson	For meritorious service to the Australian Army in the field of Combat Force Logistics	
Army	Warrant Officer Class One Geoffrey Lawrence Hughes	For meritorious service to the Australian Army in the field of Training	
Army	Captain David Anthony Siggers	For meritorious service to the Australian Army, in particular as the Regimental Sergeant Major of the 31st Battalion, the Royal Queensland Regiment, and the 5th/7th Battalion (Mechanised), the Royal Australian Regiment	
Army	Warrant Officer Class One Gregory Peter Spence	For meritorious service to the Australian Defence Force and to the Australian Army in the field of Physical Training and Recreation	
Air Force	Warrant Officer Pieter de Boer	For meritorious service to the Royal Australian Air Force in the Operational Maintenance Support of the F-111 Aircraft Weapon System	
Air Force	Flight Sergeant Malcolm Noel Dexter	For meritorious service to the Australian Defence Force and to the Royal Australian Air Force in the development of policy, procedures and software applications for costing analysis and cost minimisation within the Australian Defence Force	
Air Force	Wing Commander Richard James Johns	For meritorious service to the Royal Australian Air Force in the field of Personnel Management	
