= Wahlquist =

Wahlquist or Vahlquist is a surname. Notable people with the surname include:

- Åsa Wahlquist, Australian journalist
- Gil Wahlquist (1927–2012), Australian journalist
- Heather Wahlquist (born 1977), American actress
- Hege Bakken Wahlquist (born 1992), Norwegian handball player
- Magnus Vahlquist (born 1938), Swedish diplomat

== See also ==
- Wallquist
- Wahlqvist
