= Truro murders =

Series of murders in South Australia

Christopher Robin Worrell
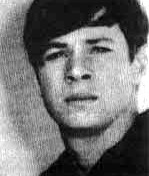
- Christopher Worrell
- Born: 17 January 1954; Australia
- Died: 19 February 1977 (aged 23); Adelaide, South Australia, Australia
- Other name: The Truro Murderers
- Status: Deceased before trial

Details
- Victims: 7
- Span of crimes: 23 December 1976 – 12 February 1977
- Country: Australia
- State: South Australia

James William Miller
- Born: 2 February 1940
- Died: 21 October 2008 (aged 68)
- Other name: The Truro Murderers
- Penalty: 6x life imprisonment with non-parole period of 35 years

Details
- Victims: 7
- Span of crimes: 23 December 1976 – 12 February 1977
- Country: Australia
- State: South Australia
- Date apprehended: 23 May 1979

The Truro murders is the name given to a series of murders uncovered with the discovery in 1978 and 1979 of the remains of a young woman and teenage girl in bushland east of the town of Truro in South Australia. After police searches, the remains of seven women and girls were discovered in total: five at Truro, one at Wingfield, and one at Port Gawler. The victims had been murdered over a two-month period in 1976–1977.

== Discovery ==
On 20 April 1978, William "Bill" Thomas and his brother found what they thought was the bone from the leg of a cow while mushrooming in bushland beside Swamp Road near the South Australian town of Truro located about 70 km northeast of Adelaide. Bill's wife Valda had concerns about the find and two days later convinced her husband to have another look. Upon closer inspection, they noted that the bone had a shoe attached; inside the shoe was human skin and painted toenails. Clothes, blood stains, and more bones were found nearby. The remains were later identified as those of Veronica Knight, an 18-year-old woman who had vanished from an Adelaide street two days before Christmas of 1976. The lack of an obvious cause of death, along with the location, led to a belief that Knight may have gotten lost and died of thirst, so the death was not considered suspicious. Almost one year later, on 15 April 1979, police discovered the skeletal remains of 16-year-old Sylvia Pittmann, about 2 km from where Knight's remains had been located. Pittmann had disappeared around the same time as Knight.

There was the strong suggestion of a link between the two dead women found in the Truro bushland and five other young women and teenage girls reported missing in Adelaide at the time, and South Australian police faced the difficult task of piecing together evidence.

Eleven days later, a huge search party discovered two more skeletons in a paddock on the opposite side of Swamp Road. They were the remains of Connie Iordanides and Vicki Howell, two of the five missing young women and girls.

== Arrest ==
Christopher Worrell aged 23, described as young, charismatic and sociopathic, and James Miller, a 38-year-old labourer, described as a drifter and homosexual partner of Worrell, are believed to have committed the murders.

Miller and Worrell met when they were in prison together, Miller for breaking and entering, Worrell for rape and breaching a two-year suspended sentence for armed robbery. After the release, they formed a dominant/submissive relationship and both lived and worked together. Miller was infatuated with Worrell, who would allow Miller to perform sexual acts on him while he read pornographic, and predominantly BDSM, magazines. As Worrell preferred women, this later ceased and they became more like brothers.

Worrell and a woman, Deborah Skuse, were killed in a car crash on 19 February 1977, thus ending the murders. Miller survived the car crash.

Miller suffered depression and became homeless after Worrell's death. Miller's state of mind and a chance comment were to eventually give police a breakthrough when at Worrell's funeral, his former girlfriend Amelia told Miller that Worrell had had a suspected blood clot on the brain. This announcement prompted Miller to tell her about Worrell's fascination with thrill killing, suggesting that the clot might possibly have been responsible for the moods that led Worrell to kill.

In May 1979, she collected a $30,000 reward after providing the information to police leading to Miller's arrest and capture. Amelia said that she had not come forward earlier because she had no proof the admission was true and that there was not much point in going to the police as Worrell was dead. It was only after reading of the murders in the newspaper that she came forward. It is highly likely that the murders would have gone unsolved if Amelia had not come forward.

Miller was brought in for questioning on 23 May 1979. Initially he denied knowing anything, but eventually stated that Amelia had "done what I should have" and told detectives that there were three more bodies. Miller was driven under guard to Truro, Port Gawler and the Wingfield dump where he pointed out their locations.

=== Victims ===
In 1984, James Miller published an autobiography (ghost-written by Dick Wordley), entitled Don't Call me Killer. It has become the established narrative of how the killings occurred. Miller's account of the murders is as follows:

- Veronica Knight (23 December 1976; aged 18)
  Knight had become separated from her friend while shopping and accepted a ride home. Miller claims they talked her into going for a drive in the Adelaide foothills. Worrell parked while Miller went for a walk. Returning to the car he found Knight dead; Miller alleged that he angrily confronted Worrell, who pulled a knife and threatened him. Worrell was in a black mood and wouldn't talk; Miller helped him dump the body at Truro. They both returned to work the next morning.
- Tania Kenny (2 January 1977; aged 15)
  Miller and Worrell picked Kenny up after she had just arrived in the city after hitchhiking from Victor Harbor. They drove to Miller's sister's home and Miller sat in the car while Worrell and Kenny went inside. Worrell later returned and asked for help. Allegedly, an argument occurred and Worrell threatened to kill Miller if he did not help. That night they buried Kenny at Wingfield.
- Juliet Mykyta (21 January 1977; aged 16)
  Mykyta was waiting at a bus stop after finishing a part-time job in the city when Worrell offered her a lift home. Instead, he drove her to Port Wakefield. This time Miller sat in the car while Worrell tied her up. This behaviour was not unusual—"it was Worrell's kink"—so Miller thought nothing of it. Miller alleges he then went to take a walk but turned around after hearing a disturbance. Mykyta was out of the car and falling to the ground. Worrell turned her over and began strangling her. Miller claims that he tried to pull Worrell off, but was not strong enough, and that again Worrell threatened to kill him. Mykyta's remains were also found at Truro.
- Sylvia Michelle Pittmann (6 February 1977; aged 16)
  Picked up as she waited for a train at the Adelaide railway station. They drove to the Wingfield area where Miller went for a walk and later helped dispose of Pittmann's body at Truro.
- Vickie Howell (7 February 1977; aged 26)
  When Miller arrived at a local post office, Howell was already with Worrell. Stopping the car, Miller went for a walk; soon after returning, but finding nothing untoward, he then took a longer walk. When he returned, Howell was dead and Worrell was in a rage. Miller claims that he cursed and abused Worrell, expecting to be killed himself, but Worrell said nothing. Howell's body was then taken to Truro.
- Connie Iordanides (also known as Connie Jordan; 9 February 1977; aged 16)
  Picked up in the city centre and offered a lift home, Iordanides became frightened when they drove in the wrong direction. Miller stopped at Wingfield and Worrell forced the screaming girl into the back seat while Miller did nothing. He left the car for a while; after returning, they drove to Truro.
- Deborah Lamb (12 February 1977; aged 20)
  Lamb was hitchhiking on West Terrace when picked up. They drove to Port Gawler where Miller went for his walk. When he returned to the car, Lamb was absent and Worrell was pushing sand into a hole with his foot. Lamb was later found buried alive at the spot.
- Deborah Patricia Skuse (19 February 1977; aged 21; killed in the motor accident that claimed Worrell's life)
  Skuse was the ex-girlfriend of a friend of the pair. After her break-up, Miller and Worrell took her to Mount Gambier for the weekend, but Worrell got into one of his black moods and they decided to return to Adelaide on the Saturday afternoon. Worrell was driving when the car blew a tyre and rolled several times, throwing all three onto the road. Worrell and Skuse died; Miller broke his shoulder blade.

All the women and girls, except Tania Kenny, were raped and murdered where their bodies were located. Tania Kenny was killed in a house that Miller's sister had previously been renting. Miller initially admitted six of the assaults and murders occurred in situ, but recanted when he realised his honesty was self incriminating; "If Miller and Worrell took them directly to the area around Swamp Road, and they died, he could hardly say he didn't know their fate".

Miller continued to visit Skuse and Worrell at the cemeteries. He could never forget them. One year to the day after their death, Miller placed a few paragraphs in the "In Memoriam" notices in the Adelaide Advertiser which read:

" Worrell Christopher Robin. Remembrance of a friend who passed away one year ago. The qualities of friendship, thoughtfulness, and kindness displayed by Chris are acknowledged and will not be forgotten. Hope is expressed for a reunion in the afterlife."

All the murder victims had been strangled, although there was a strong suspicion that the last of them, Lamb, had been alive when buried.

Criminologist Paul Wilson has suggested that had Worrell not died, the Truro murders may have become a much more devastating killing spree, as Worrell was following the "established behaviour of some serial killers" with the time between murders getting shorter. Miller himself told Worrell's girlfriend before his arrest that, "It was getting worse lately. It was happening more often. It was perhaps a good thing that Chris died".

Worrell was a "serial psychopathic–sexually sadistic homicide offender" who has been called "Australia's BTK", a reference to the pseudonym of US serial murderer Dennis Rader.

== Accused ==
Miller stood trial for the murders, and was found guilty of six of the seven murders (with the exception of the first murder, Veronica Knight) on 12 March 1980. Unusually, he was convicted of murder despite allegedly having never touched a victim; he was sentenced to the maximum six consecutive terms of life imprisonment.

The testimony at his trial revealed a terrifying story. Miller and Worrell would cruise the city streets every night in Worrell's 1969 blue-and-white Chrysler Valiant (VF) wagon, looking for women that Worrell could have sex with. Worrell was 23, charismatic and good-looking, so Worrell had no trouble in regularly "picking up" local girls for casual sex. Miller would drive Worrell and the woman to a secluded place, where Worrell would have sex with the women, often after tying them up, while Miller waited outside the car. Miller would then drive them back into town and drop them off.

Miller described how the "pick-ups" became more and more terrifying. First, Worrell started occasionally raping the women who refused his advances. Then he started murdering them. Miller was unaware that murder would occur prior to it happening; he stated that it only happened some times and not others. It appeared that as the violence increased, Miller became increasingly fearful of Worrell.

Miller maintained, "They can give me life for knowing about the murders and not reporting them. But they charged me with murder ... It's a load of bullshit". Following the trial one of the jurors hired a lawyer to petition the attorney-general for a retrial. South Australian Chief Justice Len King agreed that Miller should be granted another hearing on the grounds that the judge at his trial, Mr Justice Matheson, had instructed the jury to find Miller guilty of murder. Attorney-General of South Australia Chris Sumner refused to grant a retrial.

Legally, Miller argued that he never engaged in any murders directly, nor did he explicitly agree prior to going out cruising for women that he would support Worrell in the murders. Nevertheless, he was found guilty of murder because he was found to be a part of a joint criminal enterprise. He was present at the crime scenes and assisted in disposing of the bodies. This created subsequent legal difficulties over the definition of a joint criminal enterprise, but these have largely been resolved on the basis that this was a special—and particularly horrifying—case.

In 1999, Miller applied to have a non-parole period set under new laws, and on 8 February 2000, Chief Justice John Doyle granted a non-parole period of 35 years, making Miller eligible for parole in 2014.

== Death ==
On 21 October 2008, at the age of 68, Miller died of liver failure, as a complication of having hepatitis C. He also suffered from prostate cancer and lung cancer. At that point, he was one of the longest-serving prisoners in the state.

== Media ==
An episode of the documentary series Crime Investigation Australia depicted Worrell's and Miller's crime spree.

Australian True Crime released a podcast in 2022 titled Serial Killers at Truro.

== See also ==
- List of serial killers by country
- Crime Investigation Australia (TV series)
