= Honor Dell Cleary =

Australian educator (1938–2022)

Honor Dell Cleary OAM
- Born: 12 February 1938; Cherbourg, Queensland, Australia
- Died: 12 November 2022 (aged 84); Cherbourg, Queensland, Australia
- Occupation: Early childhood educator
- Known for: Advocacy in the education, health and housing sectors

Honor Dell Cleary OAM (12 February 1938 – 12 November 2022) was an Australian early childhood educator and community leader.

Cleary is credited with introducing cultural, numeracy and literacy programs and services never before taught to Aboriginal and Torres Strait Islander children.

== Life and career ==
Cleary was a Guwa and Kuku Yalanji Aboriginal woman who was born and raised in Cherbourg, Queensland.

Her career commenced when she completed an early childhood course with the childcare centre situated at Brisbane City Hall. After working at the centre for a further twelve months after obtaining her qualification, after which she commenced working for the Yelangi Aboriginal and Torres Strait Islander Preschool where she stayed for more than thirty years.

Her community involvement included serving as an elder with the Murri Court, as a board member of the Moreton Regional Elders Committee and as a board member of the Health Service. Cleary also had an interest in health and housing issues, particularly in the Moreton Bay and Pine Rivers regions. She was a foundation member of the Bunyabilla Aboriginal Corporation, and lobbied for accessible and affordable housing options. Cleary also served on advisory boards for the Royal Brisbane and Women's Hospital, and helped develop and establish a super clinic at Strathpine.

== Awards and honours ==
A social housing complex at Lawnton was named in Honor Dell Cleary Place in her honour in 2018.

Cleary was also involved with the Brisbane Natives Rugby League Football Club and The Golden Oldies, an annual celebration of elders from Aboriginal missions and communities. She was also involved with establishing the first local Aboriginal debutante balls and the local Ration Shed tours.

In the 2000 Australia Day Honours, Cleary was awarded a Medal of the Order of Australia in recognition of her services to Aboriginal communities. She was awarded the Centenary Medal in 2001, also for her service to the Aboriginal community particularly at Pine Rivers.

In 2013, Cleary was awarded an honorary Doctor of the University degree from Central Queensland University in recognition of her contributions to early childhood education.

== Death ==
She died on 12 November 2022. A funeral was held at the Cherbourg Community Hall on 25 November 2022.

In 2023, she was posthumously named as a Queensland Great.
