= Wallquist =

Wallquist is a Swedish surname. Notable people with the surname include:

- Benjamin Wallquist (born 2000), Austrian footballer
- Olof Wallquist (1755–1800), Swedish statesman and ecclesiastic

== See also ==
- Wahlquist, a list of people with the surname
