= Fraser Bergersen =

New Zealand plant biologist

Fraser John Bergersen AM FRS FAA, (26 May 1929 – 3 October 2011) was a New Zealand plant biologist.

== Education ==
Born in Hamilton, New Zealand, Bergerson earned a Master of Science degree from the University of Otago, and received a Doctor of Science from the University of New Zealand in 1962.

== Career ==
Bergerson worked for Commonwealth Scientific and Industrial Research Organisation, Division of Plant Industry, becoming Chief Research Scientist.

He was a Fellow of the Australian Academy of Science and Fellow of the Royal Society. In the 2000 Australia Day Honours he was appointed Member of the Order of Australia for "service to scientific research in the field of microbiology, particularly through the study of symbiotic nitrogen fixation in legumes leading to improved crop performance in Australia and Asia".

Bergersen died in Canberra on 3 October 2011.
