= Victor Wahlqvist =

Swedish ice hockey player

- Born: April 9, 1991 (age 34) Stockholm, Sweden
- Height: 6 ft 0 in (183 cm)
- Weight: 181 lb (82 kg; 12 st 13 lb)
- Position: Right wing
- Shoots: Left
- Elitserien team: Linköpings HC
- Playing career: 2010–present

Victor Wahlqvist (born April 9, 1991) is a Swedish professional ice hockey player. He played with Linköpings HC in the Elitserien during the 2010–11 Elitserien season.
