= Mark Wahlqvist =

Australian physician

Mark L. Wahlqvist AO
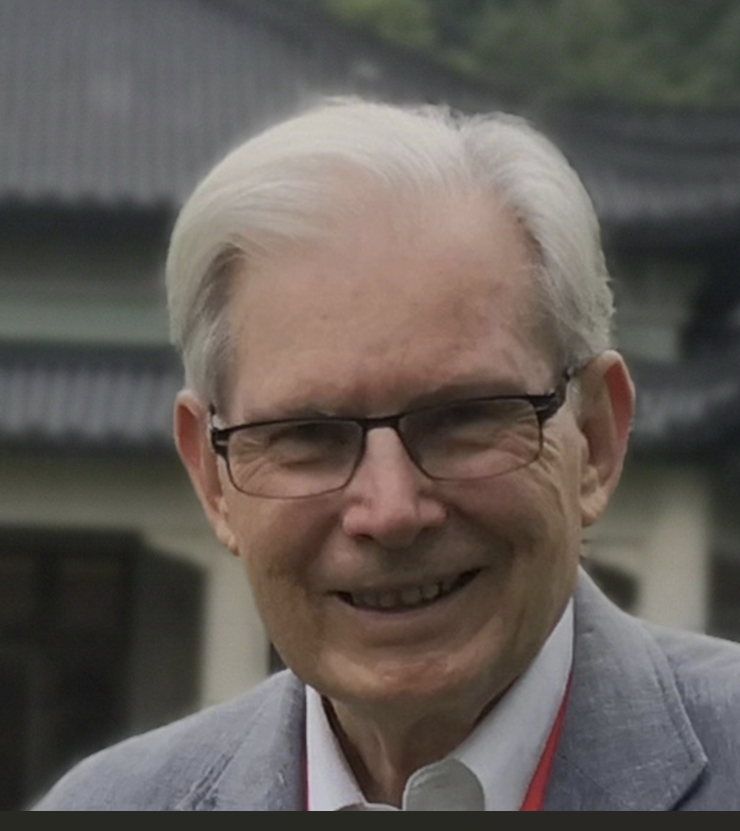
- Born: Mark Lawrence Wahlqvist; 1942 (age 83–84); Adelaide, South Australia, Australia
- Education: University of Adelaide; Uppsala University
- Spouses: Soo Sien Huang (m. 1967, deceased); Meei-Shyuan Lee (m. 2004, present)
- Children: 2
- Awards: Officer of the Order of Australia (AO) (2000)
- Scientific career
- Fields: Human nutrition Eco-nutritional science Global public health Food policy
- Workplaces: Monash University; Deakin University; Zhejiang University

Mark Lawrence Wahlqvist (born 5 February 1942) is an Australian physician, academic, and public health nutritionist known for his contributions to human nutrition, food policy, eco-nutritional science, and global public health.

Wahlqvist was the first appointed Professor of Human Nutrition in Australia. His academic appointments include an emeritus professorship at Monash University, and honorary professorships at Deakin University and Zhejiang University. He was President of the International Union of Nutritional Sciences (IUNS) from 2001 to 2005.

In 2000, Wahlqvist was made an Officer of the Order of Australia.

== Early life and education ==
Mark Wahlqvist was born in 1942 in Adelaide, South Australia, and attended Westbourne Park Primary School and Unley High School. He studied medicine at the University of Adelaide, earning a BMedSc with Honours in 1963 and an MBBS in 1966. He earned a Doctor of Medicine (MD) from the University of Adelaide in 1970 with a thesis titled "Arterial Wall Metabolism and Atherogenesis", and a second MD from Uppsala University, Sweden, in 1972, presenting the thesis "Substrate and Hormone Inter-relationships in Human Myocardial Metabolism".

== Career ==
Wahlqvist began his academic and medical career with research in metabolic physiology and clinical medicine. He served in senior academic roles in both Australia and Sweden before becoming the Foundation Professor of Human Nutrition at Deakin University in 1978. In 1987, he was appointed Chair of Medicine at Monash University, where he later directed the Asia Pacific Health and Nutrition Centre at the Monash Asia Institute (now Monash Asia Initiative).

Wahlqvist has focused on linking nutrition with ecosystems and public health outcomes through multidisciplinary and eco-nutritional frameworks. He has contributed to international food and nutrition policy through advisory roles with the World Health Organization and Food and Agriculture Organization of the United Nations (FAO), and has been involved in food and nutrition policy development. He served as Chair of Australia's Food Safety Council and was a board member of the Australian and New Zealand Food Authority (now Food Standards Australia New Zealand FSANZ).

Wahlqvist held positions at institutions in Sweden, Indonesia, China, and Taiwan. He also served as Editor-in-Chief of the Asia Pacific Journal of Clinical Nutrition for over 25 years. He also played a role in food policy as the Inaugural Chair of the Food Safety Council of Victoria.

== Research and publications ==
Wahlqvist’s research has examined the relationships between diet and chronic disease, eco-nutritional approaches to health, and cross-cultural nutrition. He has authored more than 500 peer-reviewed publications and numerous books, including Food and Nutrition in Australia first published in 1981 by Cassell and Food and Nutrition in Australia and New Zealand published by Allen & Unwin. He has also contributed to two editions of This I Believe, an Australian anthology compiled by John Marsden and published by Random House, featuring philosophical and personal reflections by 100 prominent Australians.

Wahlqvist has emphasised the importance of sustainable food systems for both public health and environmental protection. He has advocated for dietary approaches that integrate ecological, cultural, and social considerations, highlighting the interconnections between nutrition, chronic disease prevention, and food security. In interviews and publications, he has promoted intercultural dialogue in nutrition science, arguing that cross-cultural understanding is essential for effective health interventions and global nutrition policy.

== Awards and honours ==
- Charlotte Medal from the Emigrants Research Institute (Utvandrarnas Hus) in Växjö, Sweden – awarded in 1994 for distinguished contributions to international cultural and scholarly exchange
- Officer of the Order of Australia (AO) – awarded in the 2000 Australia Day Honours for services to medicine, particularly nutritional science and public health policy
- He was made an honorary Bataknese by the Bupati of Simalungun Regency on May 3, 2012, following a recommendation by the local branch of the Indonesian Women’s Association. As part of this honor, he was given the traditional name "Purba," acknowledging his cultural integration and service.
- Distinguished Foreign Fellow, Chinese Nutrition Society – 2015
- Honorary Fellow, British Nutrition Society – 2016
- Living Legend, International Union of Nutritional Sciences – 2017

Wahlqvist has been honored by national nutrition societies in Australia, the United Kingdom, the United States, China, and Taiwan for his international leadership in clinical and community nutrition.

The Mark Wahlqvist Award for Creativity and Innovation was established at Westbourne Park Primary School in South Australia to recognize students who demonstrate originality and problem-solving skills.

== Personal life ==
Wahlqvist was married to Soo Sien Huang, with whom he had two children. Following her death in 2004, he remarried Meei-Shyuan Lee. He has lived and worked across multiple continents, advocating for sustainable food systems and intercultural dialogue.

He has cited his father as a major influence on his approach to work and life, recalling the advice: “With your principles, do not be afraid to go the second mile and to go against the tide, for that is where you will make your contribution."
