= Roderick Matheson (judge) =

The Honourable Rod Matheson AM KC
- Education: St Peter's College, Adelaide
- Alma mater: University of Adelaide
- Occupations: Lawyer and judge

Justice of the Supreme Court of South Australia
- In office 9 August 1979 – 4 August 1998

Roderick (Rod) Matheson AM KC is an Australian lawyer and former judge of the Supreme Court of South Australia from 9 August 1979 to 4 August 1998.

== Early and professional life ==
Matheson was educated at St Peter's College then the University of Adelaide. He was appointed QC in 1972.

Matheson was a member of the Law Reform Committee of South Australia from 1971 to 1974. Prior to his appointment as a judge of the Supreme Court, he had been a council member, vice-president and president of the Law Society of South Australia.

== Supreme court ==
Matheson was appointed to the bench of the Supreme Court of South Australia in 1979.

One of his famous cases was that of James Miller for multiple murders known as the Truro murders.

Matheson was awarded a Member of the Order of Australia in the 2000 Australia Day Honours for service to the law and the community.

== Personal life ==
Matheson has been a significant donor and benefactor to St Mark's College, a residential college affiliated with the Anglican Church of Australia for University students in Adelaide.

== See also ==
- List of Judges of the Supreme Court of South Australia
