= Ann Elizabeth Sefton =

Australian neurologist (born 1936)

Ann Elizabeth Jervie Sefton AO (born 8 July 1936) is an Australian neurologist and educator. As a visual scientist, she developed descriptions of the connections between the eye and visual centres of the brain. As a student at the University of Sydney she was the first woman to be elected President of the Medical Society. In 2000, she was appointed an Officer of the Order of Australia (AO) for her services to medical education. She was appointed Pro-Chancellor of the University of Sydney in 2001 and served as Deputy Chancellor from 2004 to 2008.

== Early life and education ==
Sefton was born in Sydney, Australia in 1936. She studied medicine at the University of Sydney, graduating with a BSc (Med) in 1957, a MBBS in 1960, a PhD in 1966 and a DSc in 1990. While she was an undergraduate student, she was the first woman to be elected President of the University of Sydney Medical Society and helped establish the Australian Medical Students' Association, later becoming a life member of both. During her BSc and PhD she began her work on visual connections, producing papers on connections between the eye and the visual cortex.

== Career and research ==
From 1965 to 1973, Sefton worked as a lecturer in physiology at the University of Sydney, becoming an associate professor in 1985 and professor in 1992. She also served as associate dean of the Faculty of Medicine at the University of Sydney from 1991 to 1999. Her early research developed anatomical arrangements of the visual centres of the brain, with later work concentrating on the development of colour vision in mammals.

Sefton also contributed to medical education at the University of Sydney. She initiated the development of a new type of medical education program, moving away from memorisation and rote-learning, and instead integrating clinical reasoning, critical appraisal and problem solving. This approach was implemented in the Graduate Medical Program at the University of Sydney in 1997. Sefton also joined the Faculty of Dentistry as associate Dean part-time from 1999 to 2001, helping to develop their graduate dental program. Sefton received multiple awards for teaching excellence from the University of Sydney. She was also made an Officer of the Order of Australia in 2000 "for service to medical education, particularly in the area of reform and the development of a graduate medical programme, and to physiology and research in the field of neuroscience through the study of the function and structure of the visual pathways of the brain."

Sefton has been an emeritus professor at the University of Sydney since 2001. She served on the University of Sydney Senate from 2001 to 2009, becoming Pro-Chancellor in 2001 and serving as Deputy Chancellor from 2004 to 2008. She has also acted as a co-chair of the education committee of the International Union of Physiological Sciences.

== Awards and recognition ==
- 1990 – Award for teaching excellence received from the University of Sydney
- 1991 – Honorary life member of the University of Sydney Medical Society
- 1992 – Honorary Life Member of the Australian Medical Students Association
- 1993 – Education Achievement Award received from the ANZ Association of Medical Education
- 1995 – Lions Club Award received for contributions to the Save Sight Foundation
- 1995 – Lions Club Award received from the NSW/ACT Public Health Care Foundation
- 1998 – Australian Award for University Teaching
- 2000 – Officer of the Order of Australia (AO)
